= Marines =

Military organization specialized in amphibious warfare

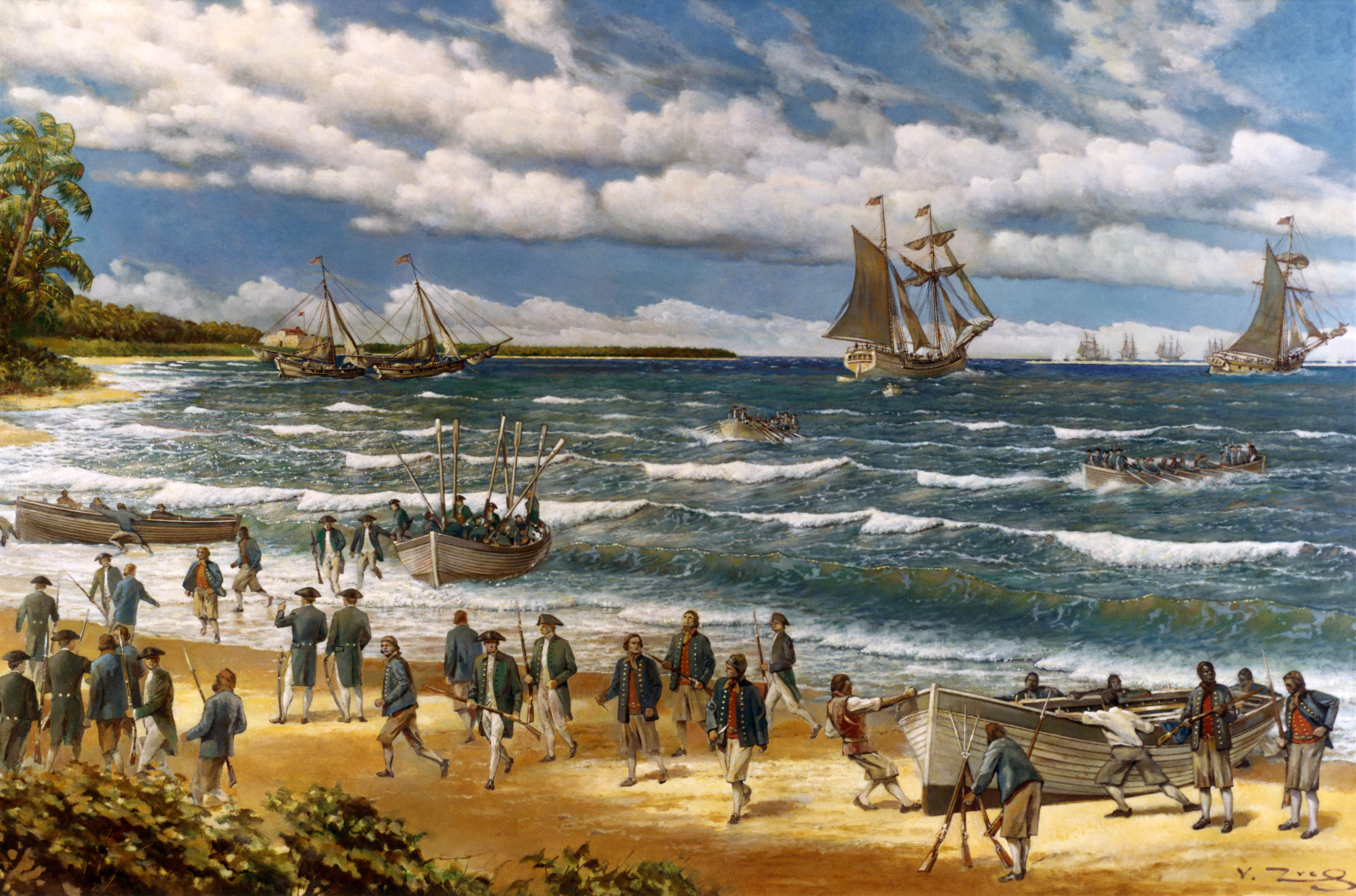
Continental Marines participating in the raid of Nassau in March 1776

Marines (or naval infantry) are military personnel generally trained to operate on both land and sea, with a particular focus on amphibious warfare. Historically, the main tasks undertaken by marines have included raiding ashore (often in support of naval objectives) and the boarding of vessels during ship-to-ship combat or capture of prize ships. Marines also assisted in maintaining security, discipline, and order aboard ships (reflecting the historically pressed nature of the rest of the ship's company and the risk of mutiny). While maintaining many of their historical roles, in modern times, marines also engage in duties including rapid-response operations, humanitarian aid, disaster relief, special operations roles, and counter-terrorism operations. In most nations, marines are an integral part of that state's navy, such as the United Kingdom's Royal Marines or Mexico's Naval Infantry; in some countries their marine forces can instead be part of the land army, such as the French Troupes de marine, or, less commonly, a nation's marine forces may be an independent military branch such as the United States Marine Corps or the Ukrainian Marine Corps.

== History ==
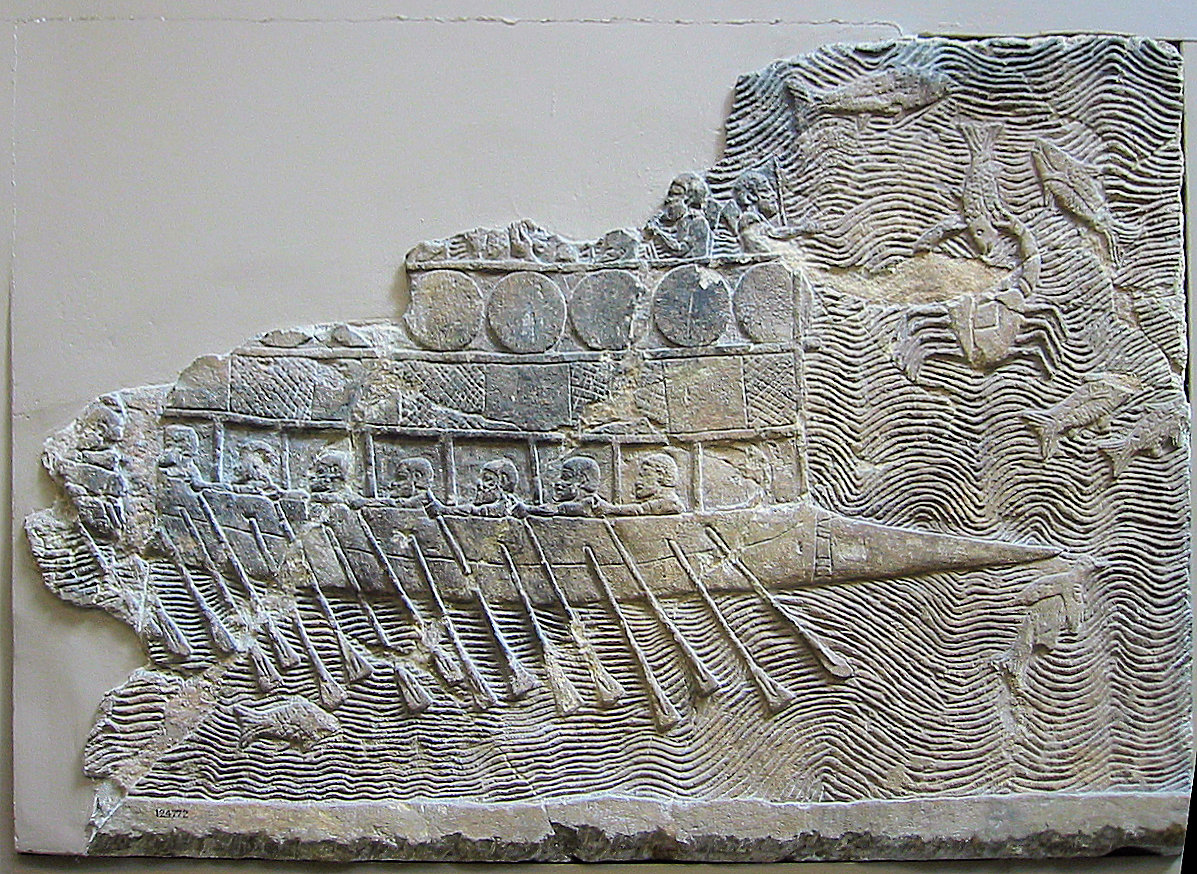
Assyrian bireme with visible marines

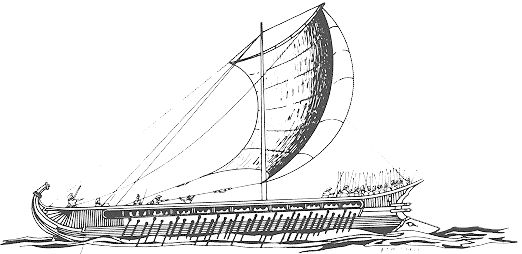
Ancient Greek trireme

The Roman corvus

In the early days of naval warfare, there was little distinction between sailors and soldiers on a warship. The oarsmen of Ancient Greek and Ancient Roman ships had to be capable of fighting the rowers of opposing ships hand-to-hand, though hoplites began appearing on Greek ships specifically for the boarding of enemy ships.

The Roman Republic was the first to understand the importance of professional soldiers dedicated to melee combat onboard ships. During the First Punic War, Roman crews were inferior in naval experience to the Carthaginians and could not match them in naval tactics, which required great fleet maneuverability. The Romans therefore employed a novel weapon — the corvus, a long, pivoting plank with a beak-like spike on the underside for hooking onto enemy ships. This was possibly developed earlier by the Syracusans against the Athenians during the Sicilian Expedition of the Peloponnesian War. Using it as a boarding bridge, Roman infantrymen invaded enemy ships, transforming sea combat into a version of land combat, where the Roman legionaries had the upper hand. During the early Principate, a ship's crew, regardless of its size, was organized as a centuria. Crewmen could sign on as naval infantry (called Marinus), rowers/seamen, craftsmen and various other jobs, though all personnel serving in the imperial fleet were classed as milites ("soldiers"), regardless of their function; only when differentiation with the army was required, were the adjectives classiarius or classicus added. The Roman Navy's two fleet legions, I Adiutrix and II Adiutrix, were among the first distinct naval infantry units.

The first organized marine corps was created in Venice by the Doge Enrico Dandolo when he created a regiment of ten companies across several ships. That corps participated in the conquest of Byzantium (1203–1204), later officially called "Fanti da Mar" (sea infantry) in 1550., Venice also had dedicated naval expeditionary corps of naval infantry, recruited primarily from Dalmatia, called the Oltremarini (overseas troops).

Later, Spanish King Carlos I assigned the naval infantry of the Compañías Viejas del Mar de Nápoles (Naples Sea Old Companies) to the Escuadras de Galeras del Mediterráneo (Mediterranean Galley Squadrons) in 1537, progenitors of the current Spanish Navy Marines (Infantería de Marina) corps, making them the oldest marine corps still in active service in the world.

== Terminology ==
The exact term "marine" is not found in many languages other than English. In French-speaking countries, there are two terms which could be translated as "marine", but neither is an exact equivalent: troupes de marine (marine troops) and fusiliers-marins (marine riflemen). In Portuguese, the similar term is fuzileiros navais (lit. 'Naval fusiliers'). The word marine means "navy" in many European languages such as Dutch, French, German, Italian and Norwegian. "Naval infantry" may also refer to sailors forming both temporary and permanent infantry units, such as the British WWI-era 63rd (Royal Naval) Division (an infantry division made-up of Royal Navy sailors and Royal Marines on a semi-permanent basis) or the Imperial Japanese Naval Landing Forces (ad-hoc formations of Imperial Japanese Navy sailors temporarily pressed into service as infantry).

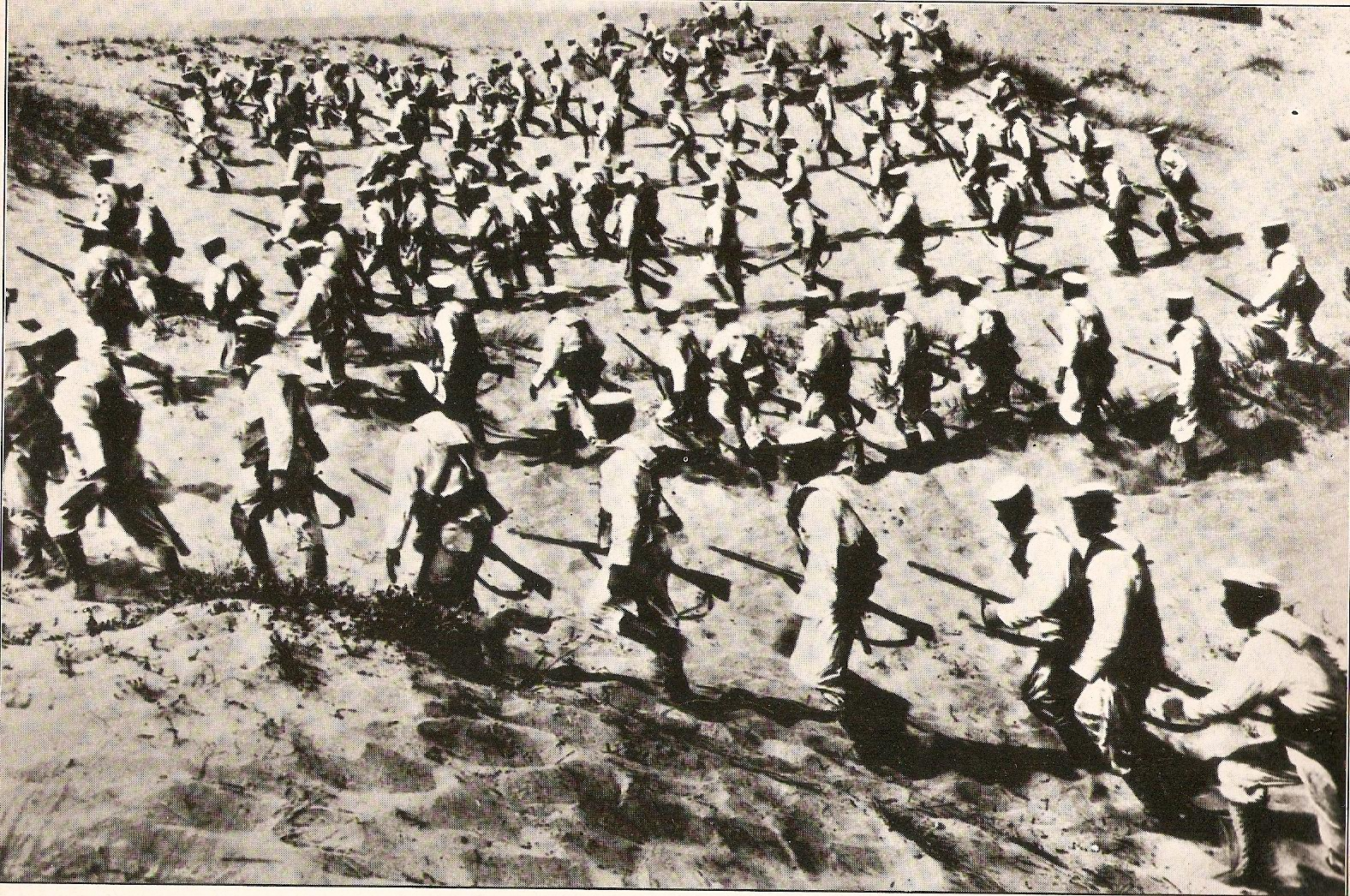
Italian marines on the Libyan coast in 1911 during the Italo-Turkish War

The English noun marine is from the adjective marine, meaning "of the sea", via French marin from Latin marinus, itself from mare ('sea'), from Proto-Indo-European *móri ('body of water, lake') (cognate with Old English mere ('sea, lake'), Dutch meer, German Meer, all from Proto-Germanic *mari).

The word marine was originally used for the marine-type forces of England; however, the word marine or marina means "navy" in many European languages, including Dutch, French, Italian, German, Spanish, Danish, and Norwegian. Because of this, exact one-word translations for the English term "marines" do not exist in many other languages (with the notable exception of the Dutch word marinier). This can lead to misunderstandings when translating. Marine forces in non-English speaking countries typically have names that translate in English to naval infantry or coastal infantry.

== Roles ==
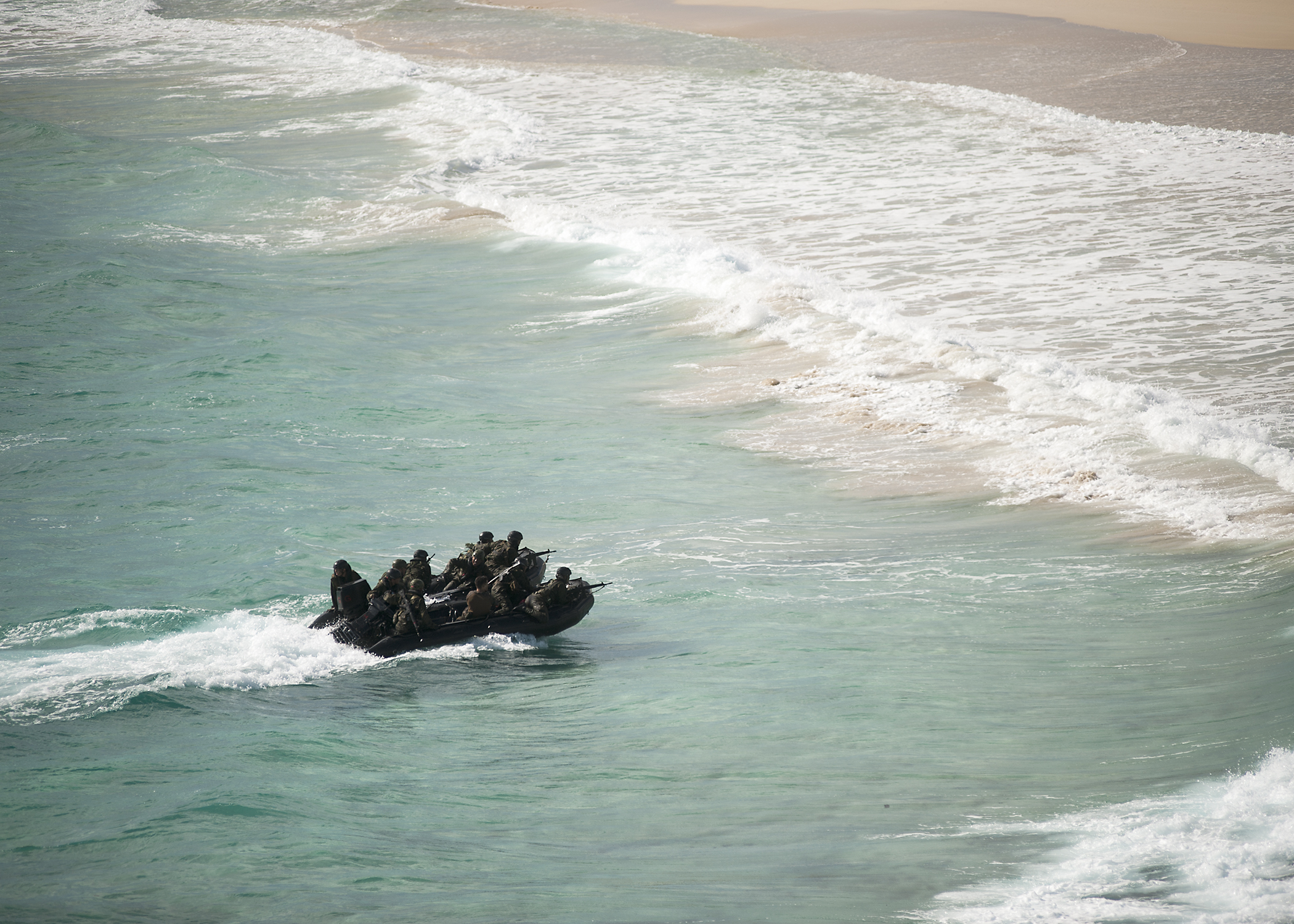
Marines in an amphibious beach assault exercise during RIMPAC

The principal role of marine troops is military operations in the littoral zone; operating from ships, they are trained to land on and secure key points to around 85 km (about 53 miles) inland, or as far as ship borne logistics can provide.

Marine units primarily deploy from warships using boats, landing craft, hovercraft, amphibious vehicles or helicopters. Specialist units are also trained in combat diving/combat swimming and parachuting.

As well as amphibious operations, marine troops are used in a variety of other, naval roles. Stationed at naval bases or forming marine detachments on board naval ships, they also conduct small scale raiding, maritime boarding operations, security of naval vessels and bases, riverine and coastal missions, mess duty, and field day operations.

In addition to their primary roles, they perform other tasks, including special operations and land warfare, separate from naval operations; ceremonial duties and other miscellaneous tasks as directed by their governments.

== By country ==
=== Algeria ===
The Marine Fusilier Regiments are the marine infantry regiments of the Algerian Navy and they are specialised in amphibious warfare.

The RFM have about 7000 soldiers in their ranks. Established in 1985.

=== Argentina ===
The Argentine Marine Corps (Infantería de Marina de la Armada de la República Argentina or IMARA) is a part of the Argentine Navy. Argentine marines have the same rank insignia and titles as the rest of the navy, although enlisted personnel have their own parade uniform. The Argentine Marine Corps dates from 1827 when a single infantry battalion was raised. This was expanded in 1880, but seven years later, the corps was merged with the existing coast artillery, to form a Naval Artillery Regiment. A series of reorganizations followed until responsibility for coastal defense was passed to the Argentine Army in 1898. Between 1935 and 1938 the marines reappeared in the form of five battalions of Marine Infantry, serving both on board ship and in coastal defense fortifications. In 1968, the Infantería de Marina was reorganized as a separate corps within the Navy.

=== Australia ===
The marine and naval infantry designations are not applied to Australian Defence Force units, although some Australian Army units specialise in amphibious warfare, including 2nd Battalion, Royal Australian Regiment which has provided an amphibious light infantry role from 2012.

=== Bahamas ===
The Royal Bahamas Defence Force (RBDF) is the navy of The Bahamas. Since the Bahamas does not have an army or an air force, its navy composes the entirety of its armed forces. The RBDF Commando Squadron is a sizable force of 500 Special Marine Commandos.

=== Bangladesh ===
The Special Warfare Driving and Salvage (SWADS) is special operations force of the Bangladesh Navy. SWADS is not Naval infantry or marine corps. SWADS operatives are trained for the role of naval special warfare and it consists of elite soldiers specially chosen from the navy. They receive special training in the United States Navy SEAls and Republic of Korea Navy Special Warfare Flotilla

=== Bolivia ===
Even though Bolivia is landlocked, Bolivian politics have always aspired to regain its coastline from Chile, after losing access to the Pacific coast in the 1879-1880 war with Chile. Because of that, Bolivia still maintains a naval force. The Bolivian Naval Force includes about 2,000 naval infantry personnel and marines. These are organized into seven small battalions.

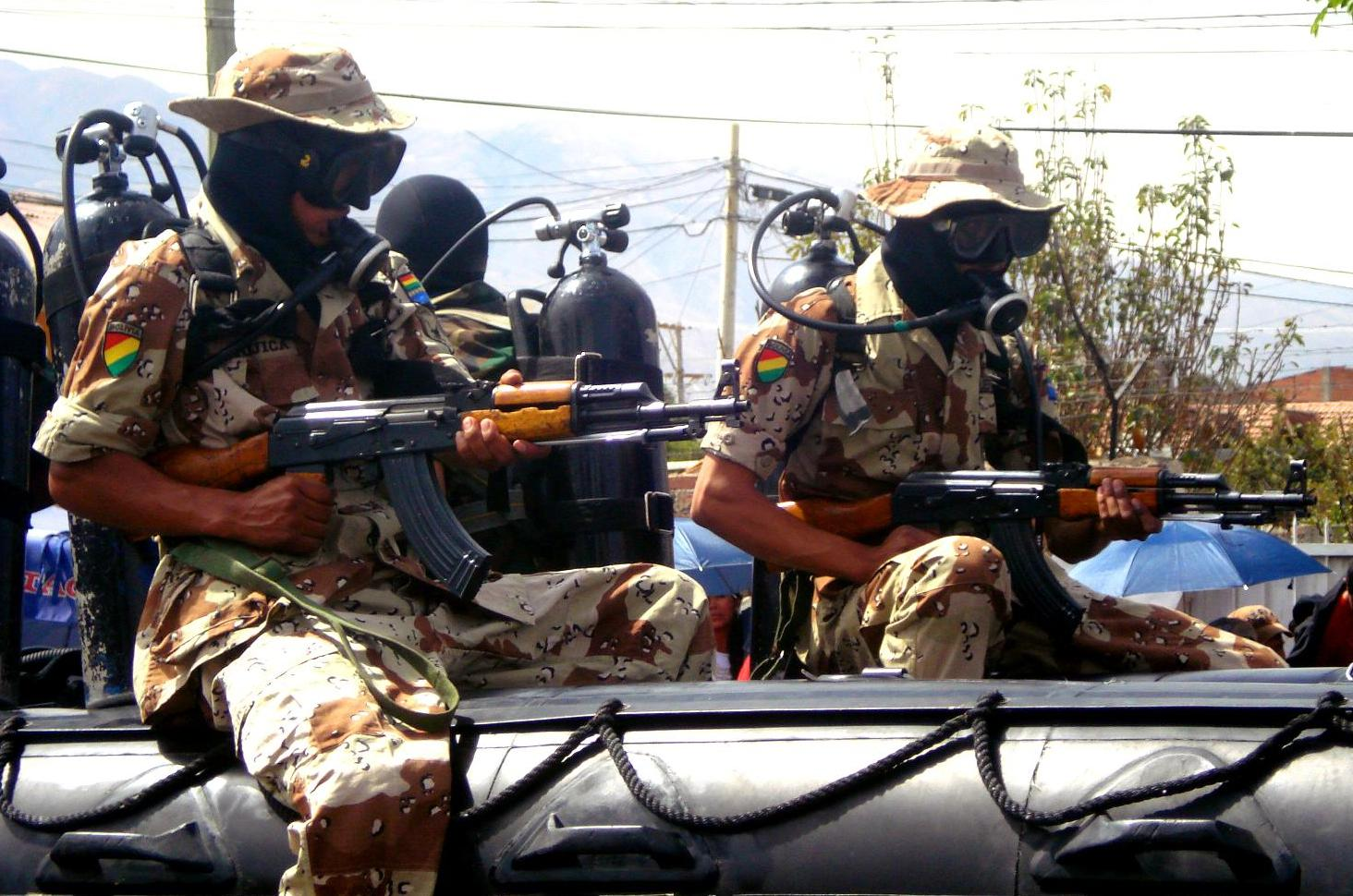
Scuba-equipped Bolivian marines aboard an inflatable boat

=== Brazil ===
The Corps of Naval Fusiliers (Corpo de Fuzileiros Navais) is subordinate to the Brazilian Navy. The marine corps is composed of an operational brigade and some guard and ceremonial duty battalions. The main unit is the brigade-sized Divisão Anfíbia (Amphibious Division). Officers´ ranks and titles are the same as for the rest of the Navy, although officers wear a star above the stripes, instead of the loop worn by surface officers.

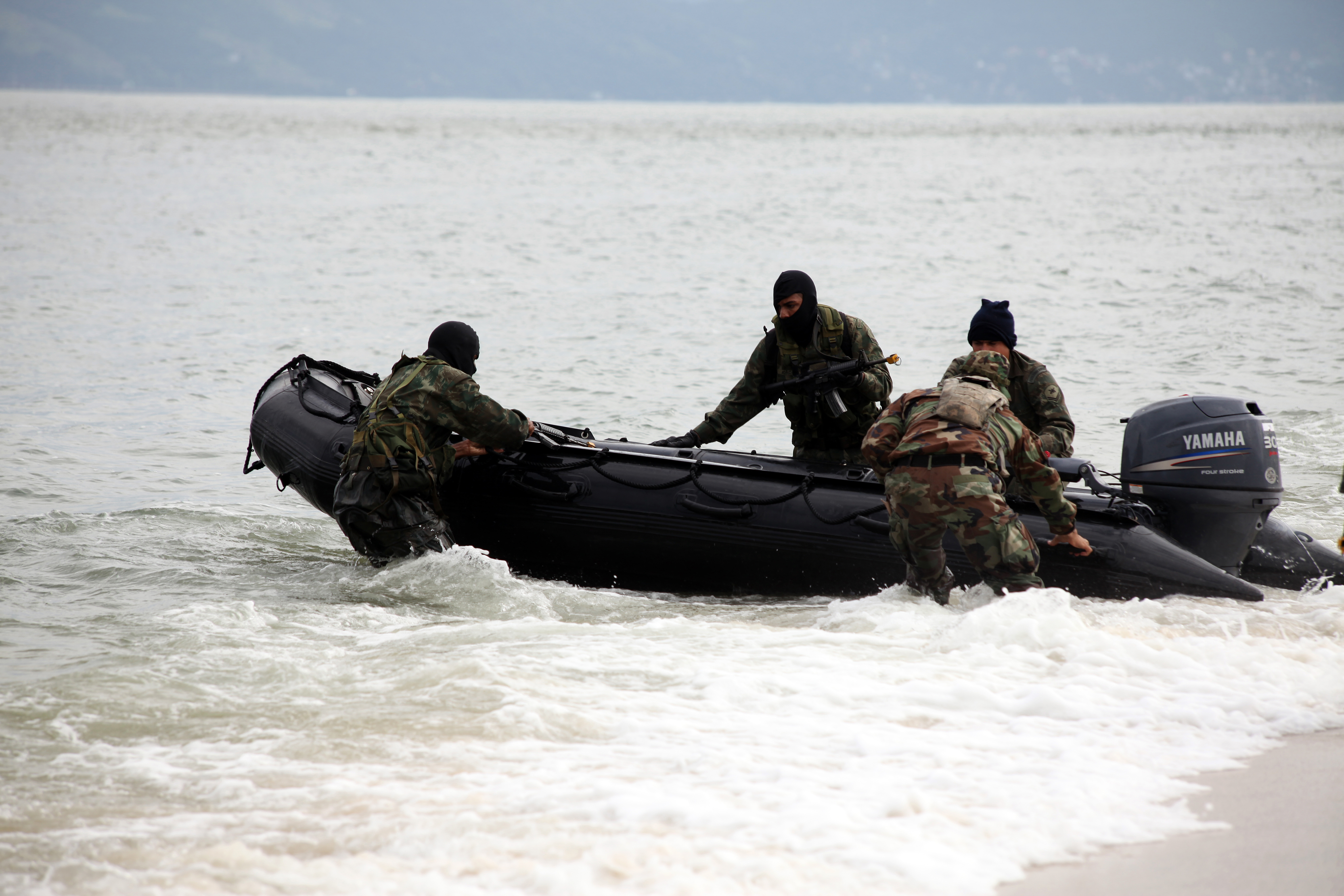
Brazilian marines

=== Cambodia ===
During the 1970-75 Cambodian Civil War the Cambodian Marine Corps were active but were effectively disbanded by the end of the Cambodian–Vietnamese War. The Royal Cambodian Navy created a force of 2,000 marines in 2007 known as the 31st Naval Infantry Brigade

=== Canada ===
Canada had a history of participating in amphibious operations such as the Normandy landings and the Allied invasion of Sicily. Even though Canada does not have a marine corps, it has units that can carry out marine-type operations, such as an amphibious-operations trained company of the 3rd Battalion of the Royal 22^{e} Régiment, JTF 2 that specializes in combat diving and amphibious reconnaissance, the Naval Tactical Operations Group that specializes in unopposed maritime interdiction, and the Naval Security Team that can provide force protection for amphibious forces.

Several authors have written a number of articles in various Canadian professional military journals since 2019 proposing/discussing the creation of a Canadian Arctic amphibious capability, including the adaption of one to three Canadian Army infantry battalions to provide the required landing forces.

=== Chile ===
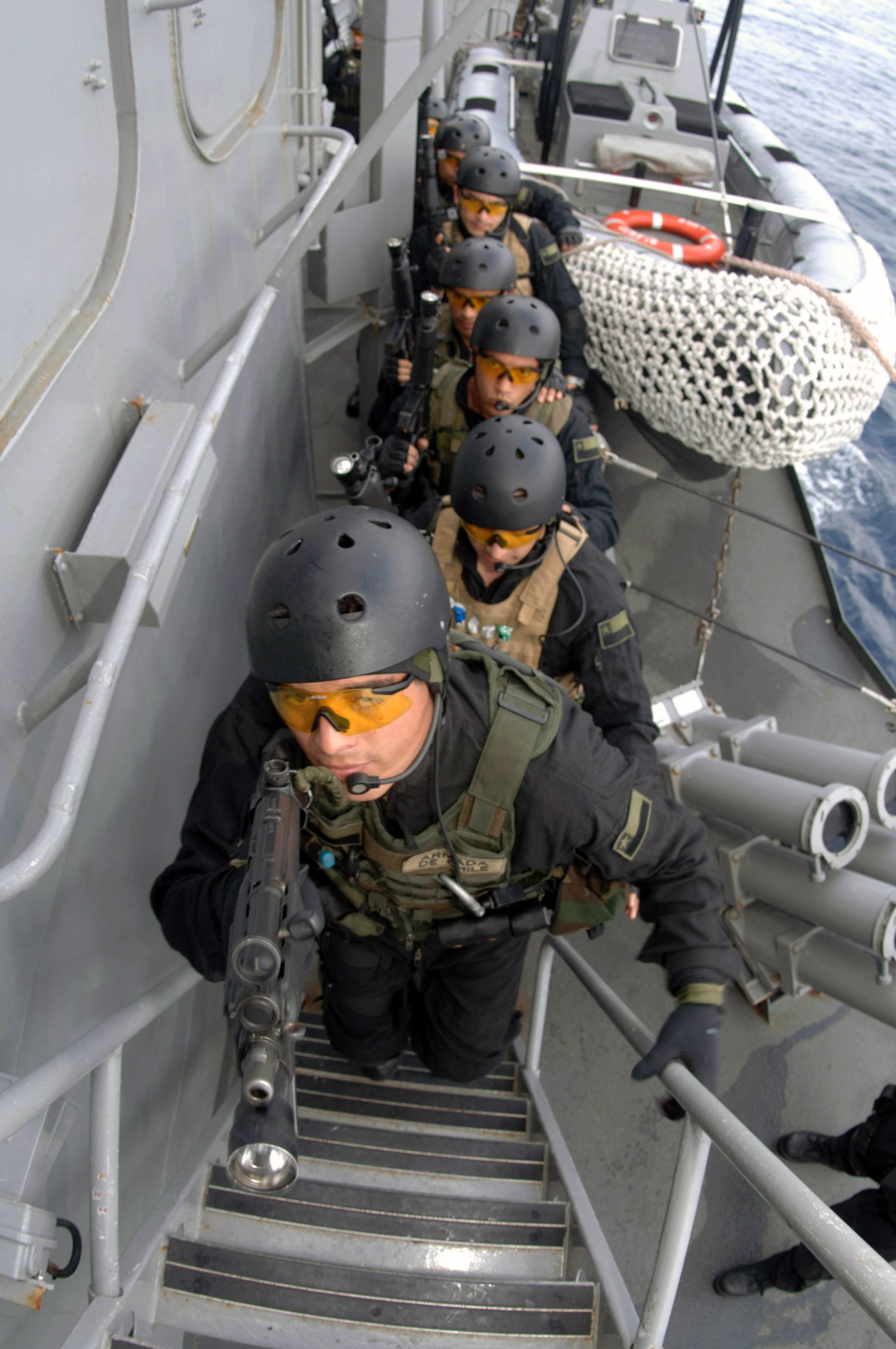
Chilean Navy special forces

The Chilean Marine Corps is a branch of the Chilean Navy. Specialized in amphibious assaults, the corps is built around four detachments based along Chile's long coasts at Viña del Mar, Talcahuano, Punta Arenas, and Iquique. There are also a number of independent companies and platoons, for security protection at naval bases, other shore installations and the Ministry of Defense. The Viña del Mar and Talcahuano detachments contribute to the Amphibious Expeditionary Brigade (Brigada Anfibia Expedicionaria). There is as a group of Marine Infantry commandos (Grupo de Comandos IM), which together with the group of naval tactical divers (Agrupación de Buzos Tácticos) are part of the Navy's Special Operations Command (Comando de Operaciones Especiales).

=== China ===
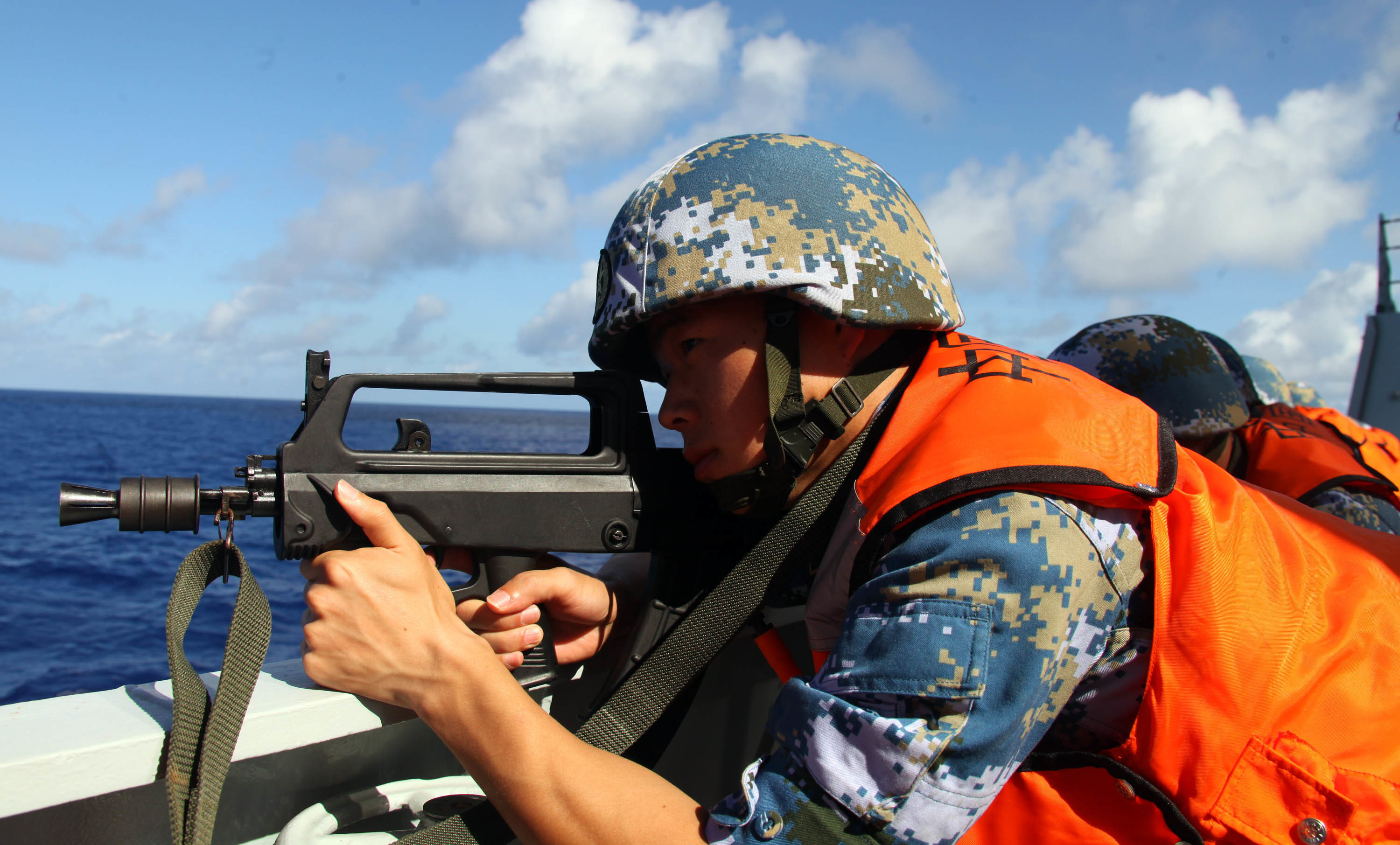
PLAN marines during RIMPAC 2016

The People's Liberation Army Navy Marine Corps (PLANMC) is a service branch of the PRC navy and is therefore under the command of the PLAN Headquarters. The PLANMC are divided into six brigades. The majority of the PLANMC's personnel is based in the South China Sea.

=== Colombia ===
The Colombian Marine Corps is a part of the Colombian Navy. The modern marine corps dates from the establishment of two rifle companies in 1936. While remaining a small force, the corps saw service during the civil war between Conservatives and Liberals of 1946–58 and provided volunteers for service in the Korean War. By the 1960s it had been expanded to a battalion of marine infantry plus five independent companies.

=== Croatia ===
Croatian Navy formed naval infantry companies during the Croatian War of Independence (1991–5), esp. on islands (Hvar: Zvir Company, Korčula: Mixed Detachment etc.) and one in Pula (Vanga Company, saw action in relieving Siege of Dubrovnik and in Operation Maslenica). As they were all dissolved during 2000s, a new naval infantry company, ~160-strong (Satnija mornaričko-desantnog pješaštva) was formed again in 2018 as a part of the Navy Flotilla and is located in Ploče.

=== Cuba ===
The Cuban Revolutionary Navy (Marina de Guerra Revolucionaria or MGR) maintains a small marine battalion called the Desembarco de Granma.

=== Denmark ===
The Guard Hussar Regiment (Gardehusarregimentet or GHR) maintains a marine squadron (only by name) which is the Marine Squadron or 4th Training Squadron based in Almegårds Kaserne on the Baltic island Bornholm. The squadron is a part of the 3rd Reconnaissance Battalion and trains conscripts.

=== Ecuador ===
The Ecuadorian Navy maintains a Naval Infantry Corps (Cuerpo de Infantería de Marina) headquartered in Guayaquil. Formed on 12 November 1962, it is organised into two security battalions, one in the Amazon River area and the other on the Pacific coast. There is also a commando battalion based on the Galápagos Islands.

=== Egypt ===
The 111th Independent Mechanized Brigade (formerly the 130th Marine Amphibious Brigade) of the Egyptian Army can conduct amphibious assault operations. There is also the 153rd Commando Group with three Marine Commandos Battalions (515th, 616th, 818th) controlling 12 Marine Commandos Companies.

=== El Salvador ===
The El Salvador Navy included two 600-man Marine Infantry Battalions (Batallon de Infanteria de Marina or BIM), and a 300-man Naval Commando Force. The BIMs were located at La Unión and Usulután. The Salvadoran Marine Corps uses green pixelated and green woodland uniforms.

=== Finland ===
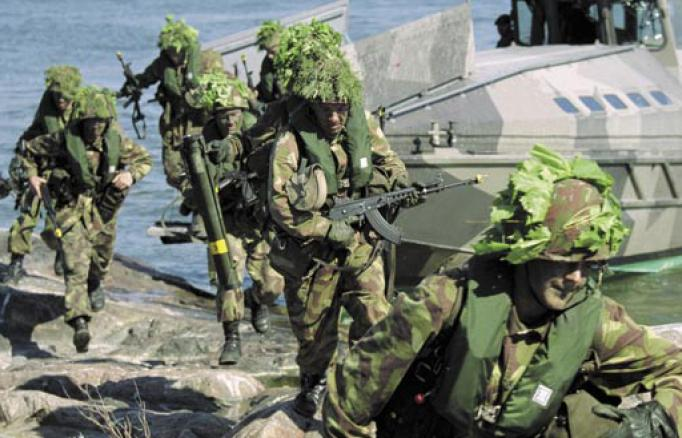
Finnish Coastal Jaegers conducting an amphibious landing

The Finnish Nyland Brigade (Nylands Brigad) in Ekenäs is the home of the Finnish Coastal Jaegers — the Kustjägarna (in Swedish) / Rannikkojääkärit (in Finnish). The Brigade is part of the Finnish Navy, and the only Swedish-speaking unit within the Finnish Defence Forces.

=== France ===
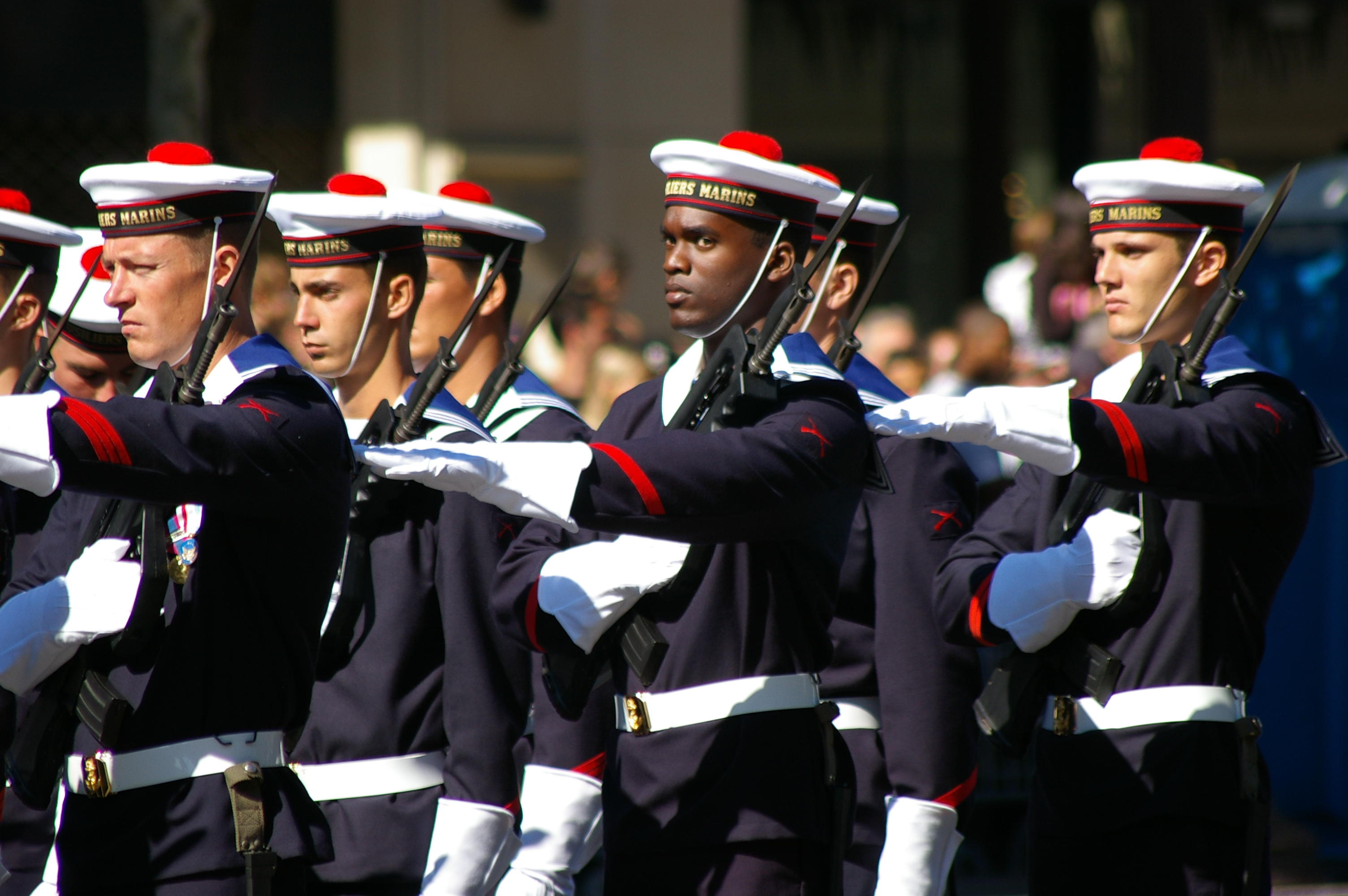
French Fusiliers marins during parade

The Fusiliers Marins (Naval Fusiliers) and Commandos Marine (Naval Commandos) are naval personnel. The fusiliers marins protect vessels and installations, provide the navy with military training, augment boarding-landing parties and support operations of the Commandos Marine. The Commandos Marine (Naval Commandos) are a seven company Commando formation whose roots can be traced to the Second World War. The Commandos Marine have evolved to be broadly comparable to the British Special Boat Service, with whom they exchange officers.

Troupes de Marine ("Marine Troops"), are a branch of the French Army, renamed from the Troupes Coloniales who served in France's overseas territories to maintain or expand French interests. The modern Troupes de Marine have units permanently based in Africa, in addition they man bases in the French Overseas Territories. They now provide the ground combat elements of French amphibious task forces and are specifically trained for that purpose. The 9th Marine Brigade (9^{e} Brigade Légère Blindée de Marine (9 BLBMa)) is twinned with the 3 Commando Brigade of the Royal Marines, organising the exchange of officers and sharing training and exercises.

=== Germany ===
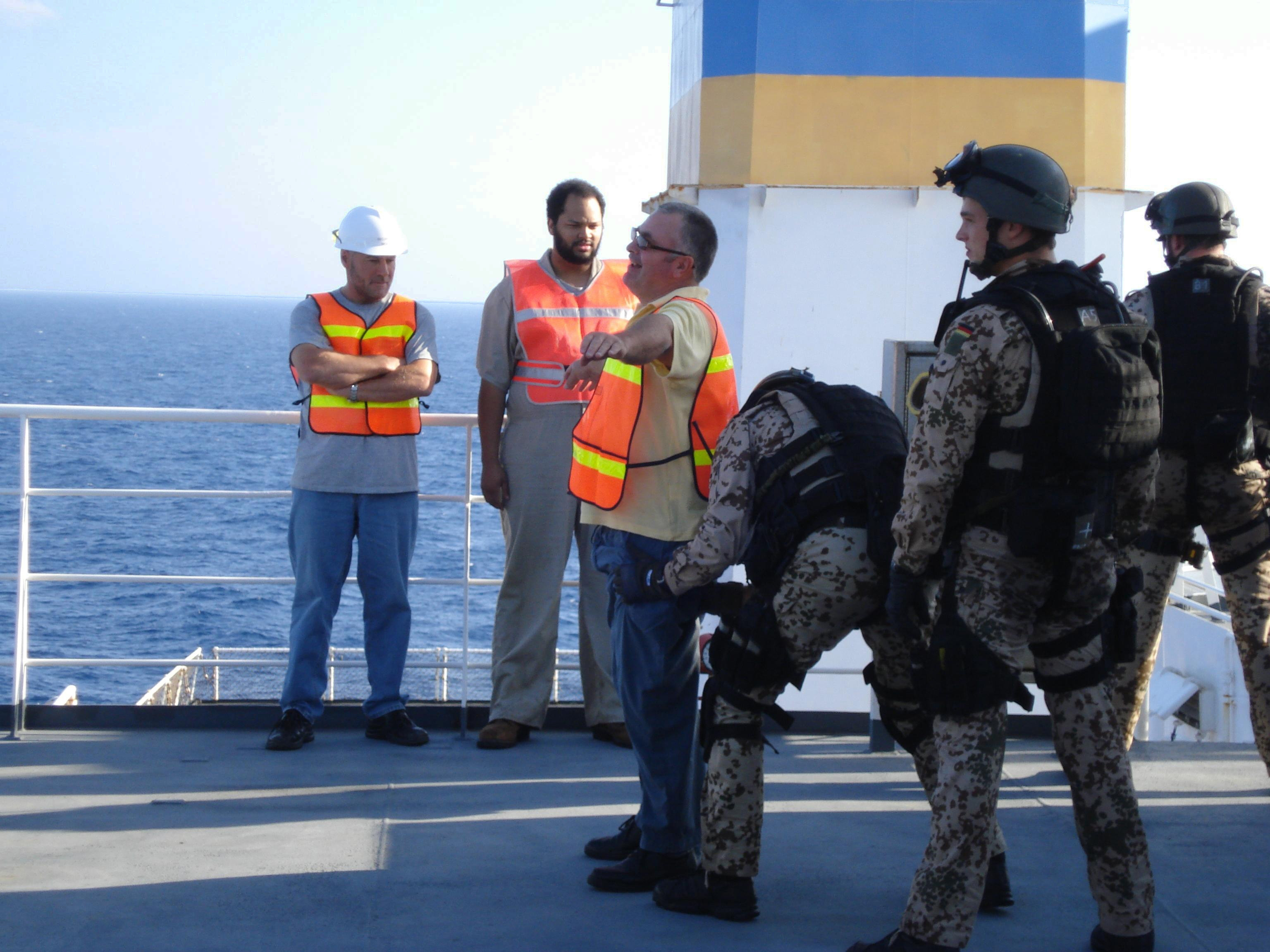
A German Navy boarding team

The Sea Battalion (Seebataillon) is a land formation of the German Navy. It was formed in Eckernförde on 1 April 2014, succeeding the Naval Protection Force.

=== Greece ===
The Greek 32nd Marine Brigade "Moravas" and the Amphibious Raider Squadrons (known as MAK) of the 13th Special Operations Command are amphibious infantry and maritime operations units maintained by the Hellenic Army and supported by the Hellenic Navy. The brigade traces its origin to 1919 as the 32nd Infantry Regiment but was only in 1967 when it was reorganised and designated as a naval infantry unit under the banner of the 32nd Marines Regiment.

=== Honduras ===
The Honduran Navy established at least one 600-man marine infantry battalion (Batallón de Infantería de Marina or BIM) in 1982.

=== India ===
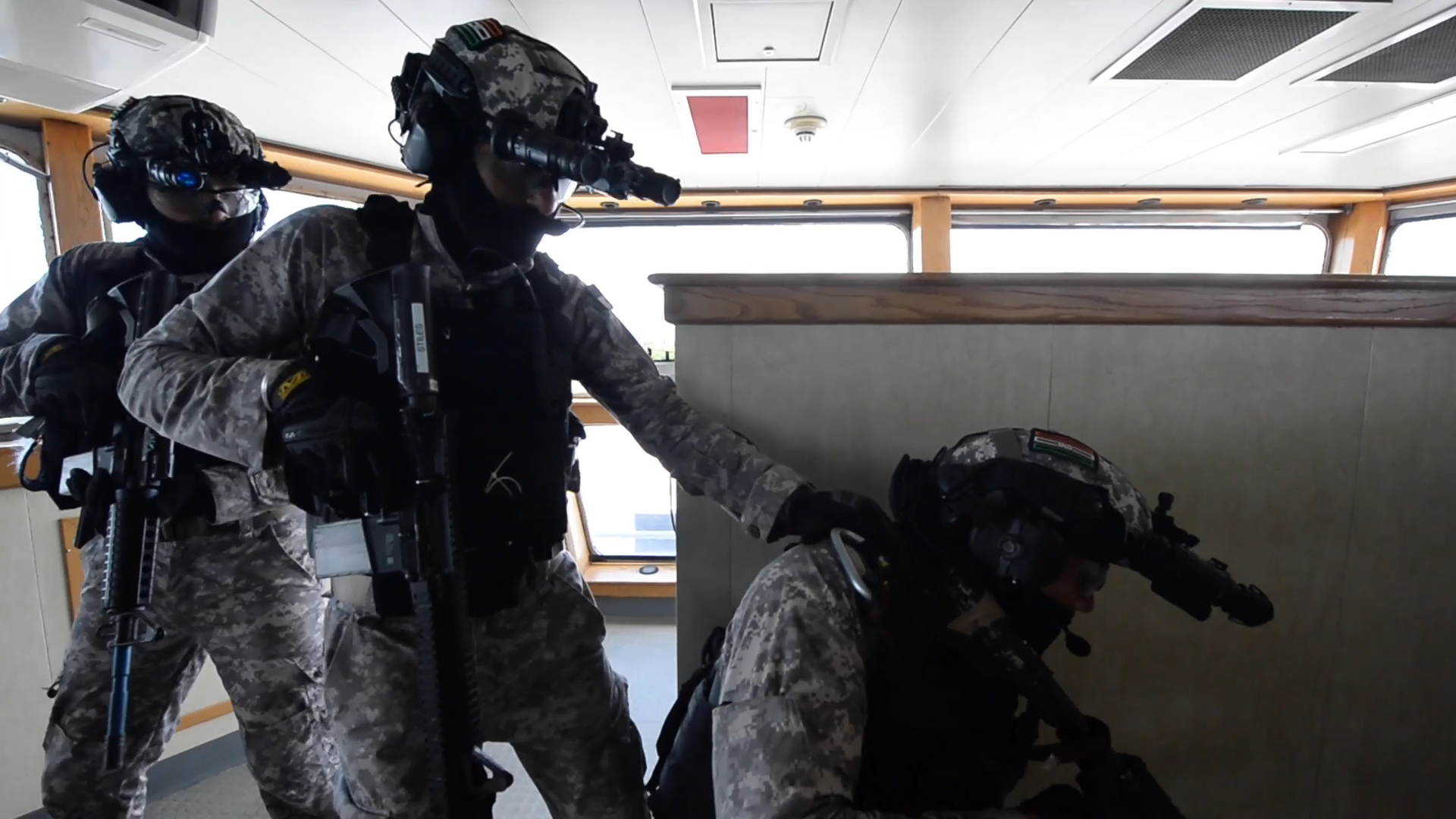
Indian MARCOS performing a simulated exercise at RIMPAC 2022

While the Indian Navy doesn’t have a dedicated Marine Corps, it does have its Marine Commando Force (MARCOS) a special operation forces.

=== Indonesia ===
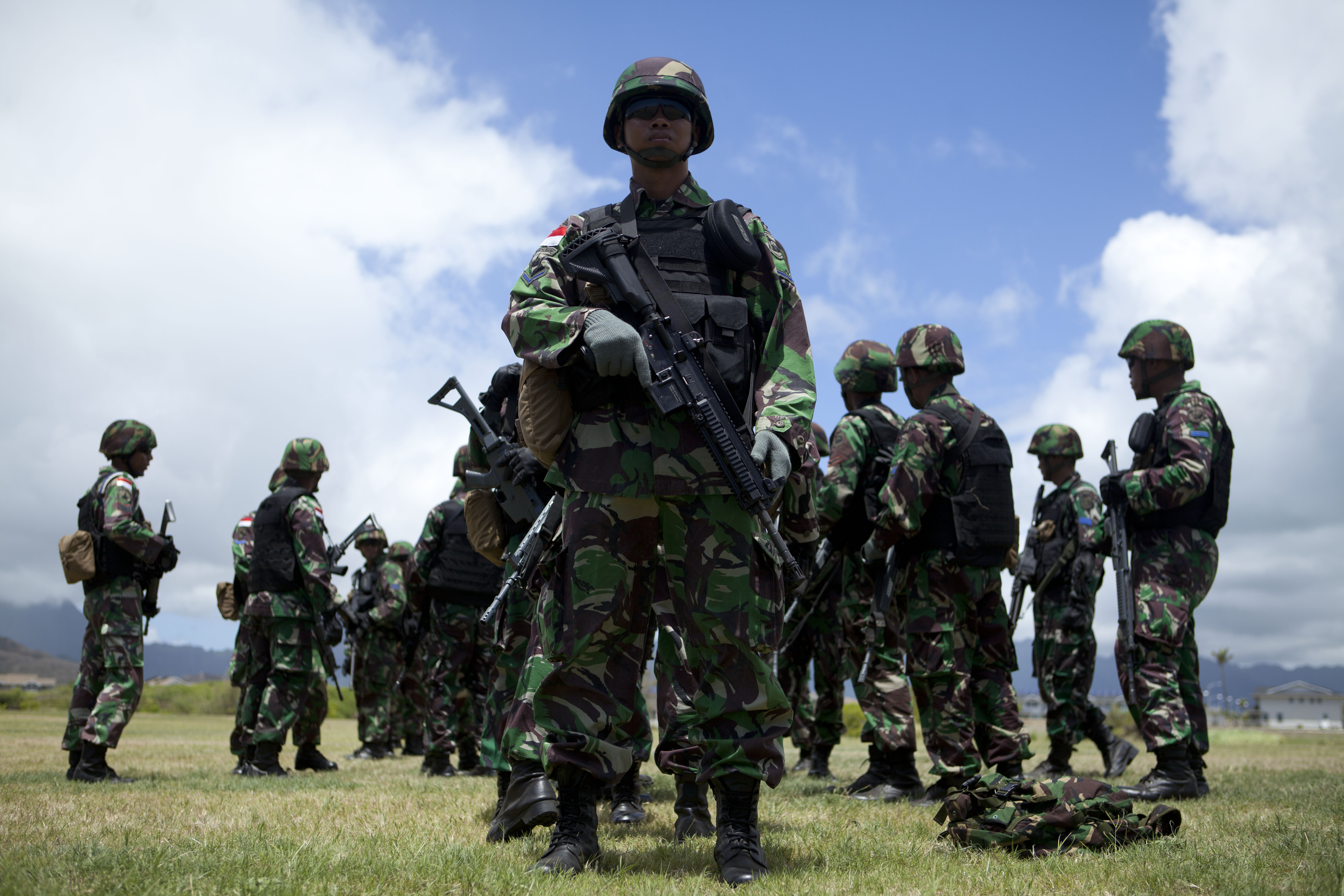
Indonesian marines during RIMPAC 2014

In Indonesia, the main amphibious warfare force and naval infantry of the Indonesian National Armed Forces is the Indonesian Marine Corps of the Indonesian Navy. The Marine commandant reports to the Chief of Staff of the Indonesian Navy.

=== Iran ===
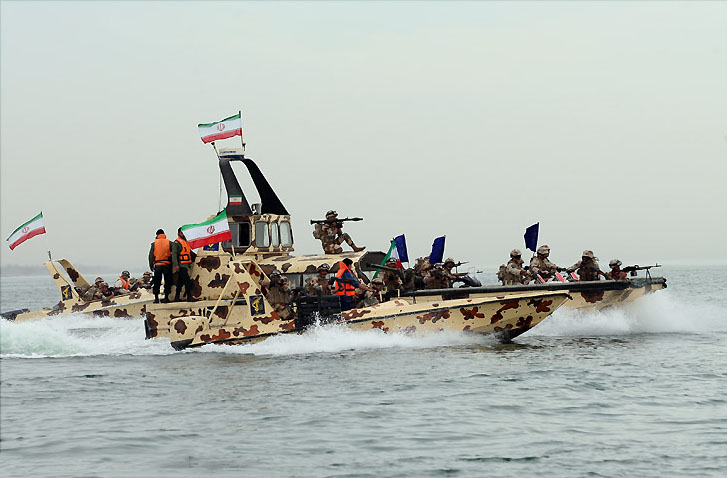
IRGCN marine forces conducting an amphibious assault exercise during the Great Prophet IX war games.

Since the Iranian Revolution in 1979, the number of marines in the Islamic Republic of Iran Navy (IRIN) has expanded to 2,600 personnel, in two marine brigades, each composed of three battalions (including the Takavar 1st Marine Brigade), officially under the Islamic Republic of Iran Navy Marine Command. Their mission is to provide security throughout the Arabian Sea and free waters, as well as securing routes for Iranian ships in the Gulf of Aden.

The Islamic Revolutionary Guard Corps Navy (IRGCN) maintains several units that may perform marine-type functions. It also has a Takavar naval commando battalion, called Sepah Navy Special Force (SNSF). They are tasked with providing security in the Persian Gulf and Strait of Hormuz, as well as conducting anti-piracy missions to assist Iranian ships.

=== Iraq ===
The Iraqi Navy is a small force with 1,500 sailors and 800 marines designed to protect the shoreline and inland waterways from insurgent infiltration. The navy will have coastal patrol squadrons, assault boat squadrons and a marine battalion. The force will consist of 2,000 to 2,500 sailors by 2010.

=== Israel ===
Upon its revival in the 1980s the Givati Brigade was intended to serve as the amphibious infantry brigade of the Israel Defense Forces, but this was not put into effect. Currently the 35th Paratroopers Brigade is the only brigade that has amphibious abilities as part of its Depth Warfare arsenal together with parachuting and air assault.

=== Italy ===
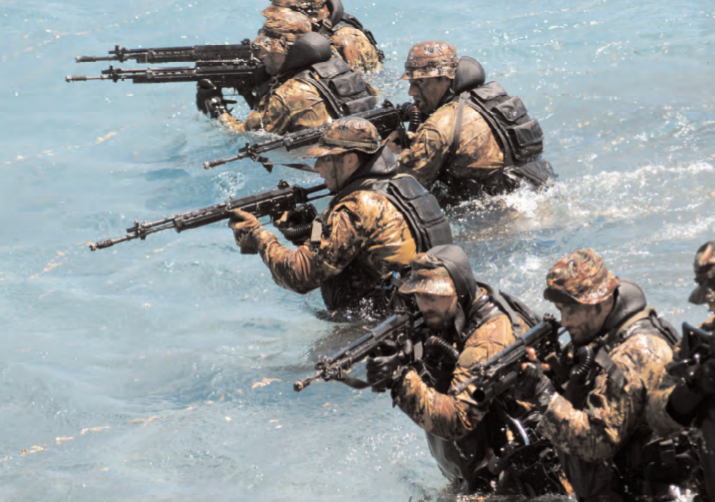
Italian marines in training

The San Marco Marine Brigade is the marine infantry unit of the Italian Navy (Marina Militare). It traces its roots back to 1550 with the formation of Fanti da Mar in the Republic of Venice.

The Serenissima Regiment is the amphibious infantry unit of the Italian Army (Esercito Italiano). Its soldiers are called Lagunari and they are the Italian Army Marines.

=== Japan ===
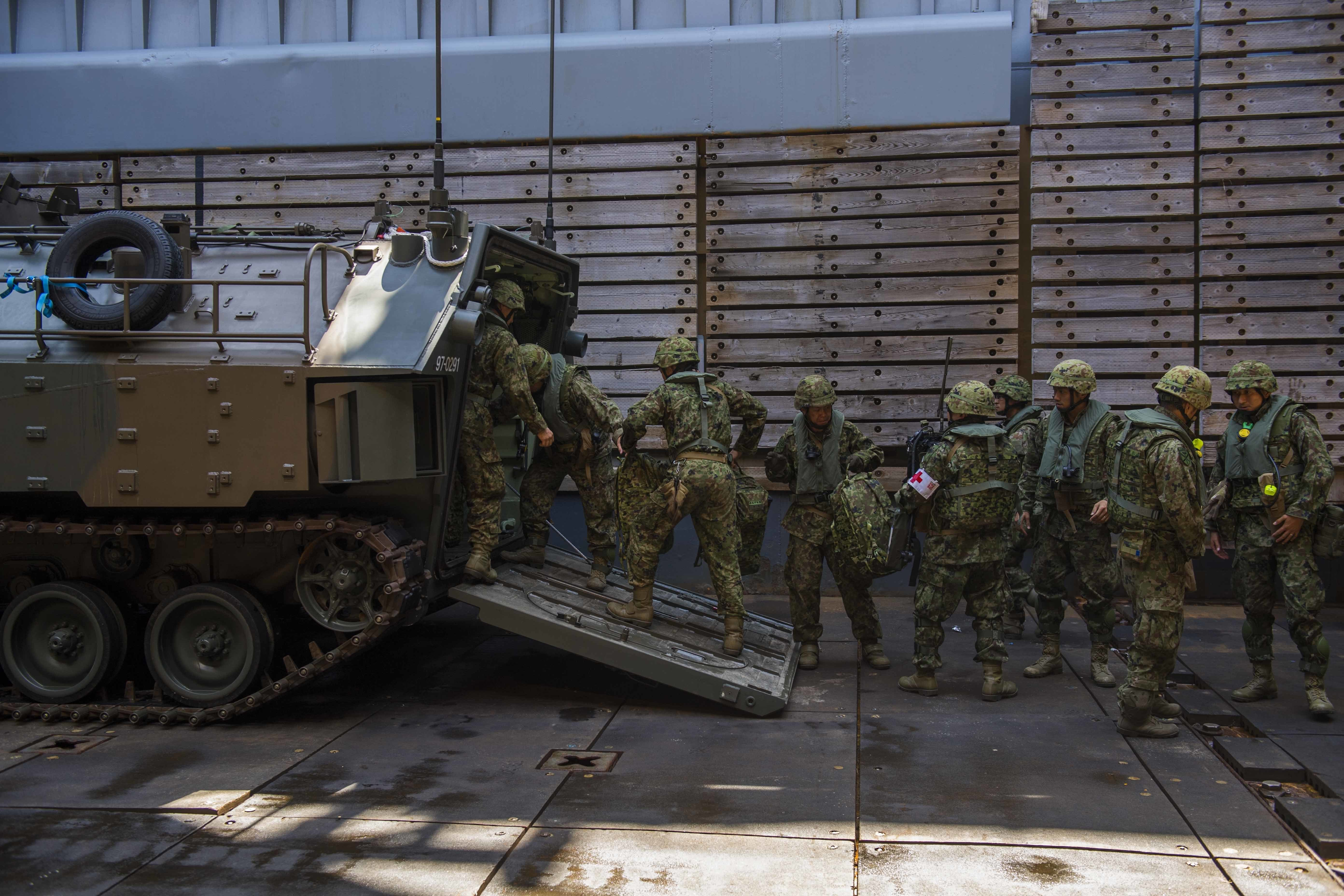
Japanese marines from the Amphibious Rapid Deployment Brigade preparing to deploy from USS Ashland

Japan Ground Self-Defense Force Amphibious Rapid Deployment Brigade – Japanese marines tasked with offensive amphibious assault to retake islands. The unit was first formed in 2018 and was the first unit of its kind created since the demilitarisation of Japan after World War II.

=== North Korea ===
The Korean People's Army's Light Infantry Training Guidance Bureau has two or more amphibious light infantry/sniper brigades. These brigades are believed deployed to Wonsan on the east coast and Namp'o and Tasa-ri on the west coast. In organization and manpower, they are reduced versions of the regular light infantry brigades with a total strength of approximately 5,000 men organized into ten battalions. Each battalion has about 400 men organized into five companies each. Some amphibious brigade personnel are trained as frogmen.

=== South Korea ===
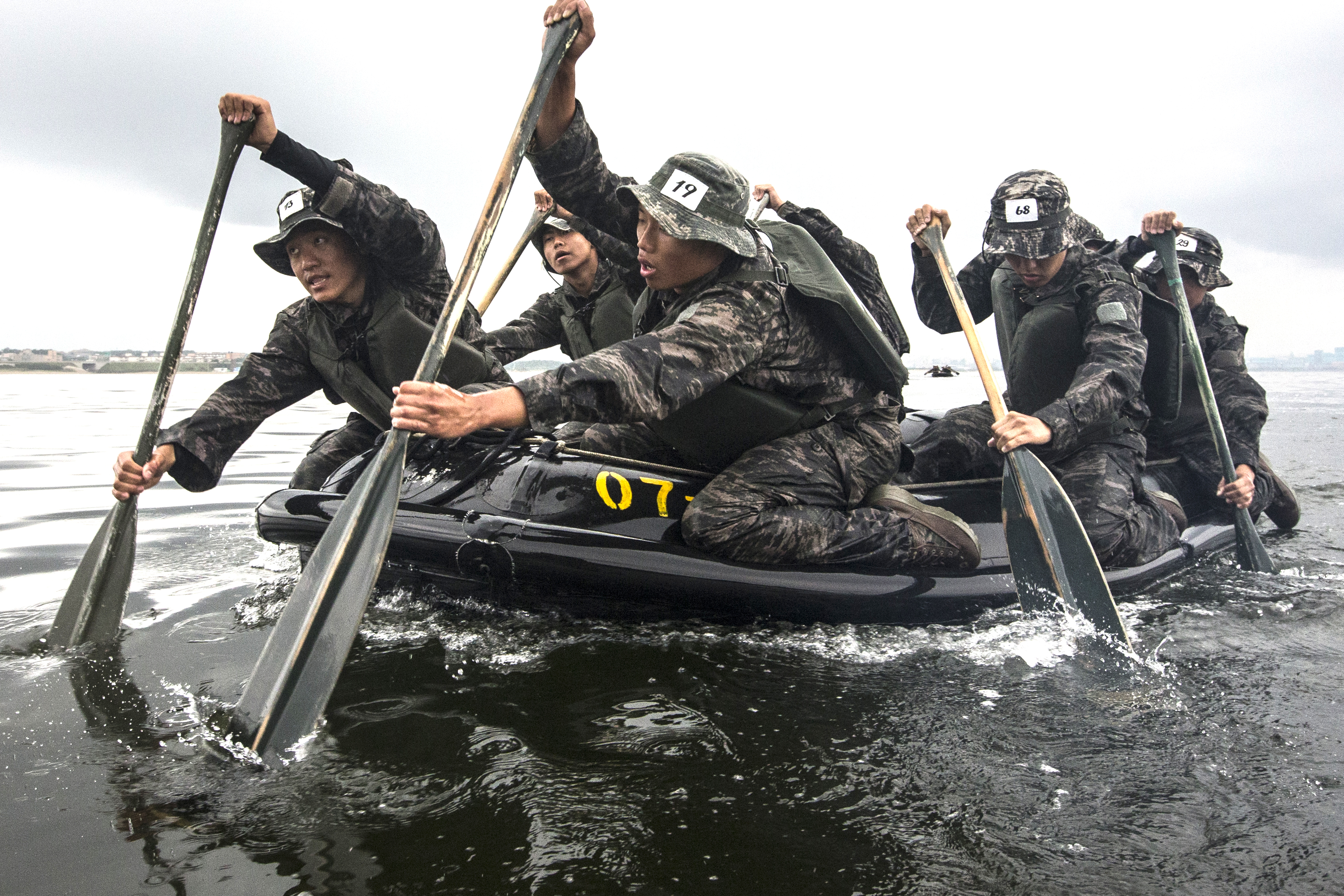
Trainees of the Republic of Korea Marine Corps in 2014.

The Republic of Korea Marine Corps is the marine corps of South Korea. It was founded as a reconnaissance force just prior to the start of the Korean War. The ROKMC has seen action in several major conflicts. Though theoretically it is under the direction of the Chief of Naval Operations for all practical purposes it operates as an independent branch of the military.

=== Lebanon ===
Lebanon maintains an elite but very small in number "Navy Commando" regiment. Trained internationally and armed with mostly American and French made equipment and weaponry.

=== Maldives ===
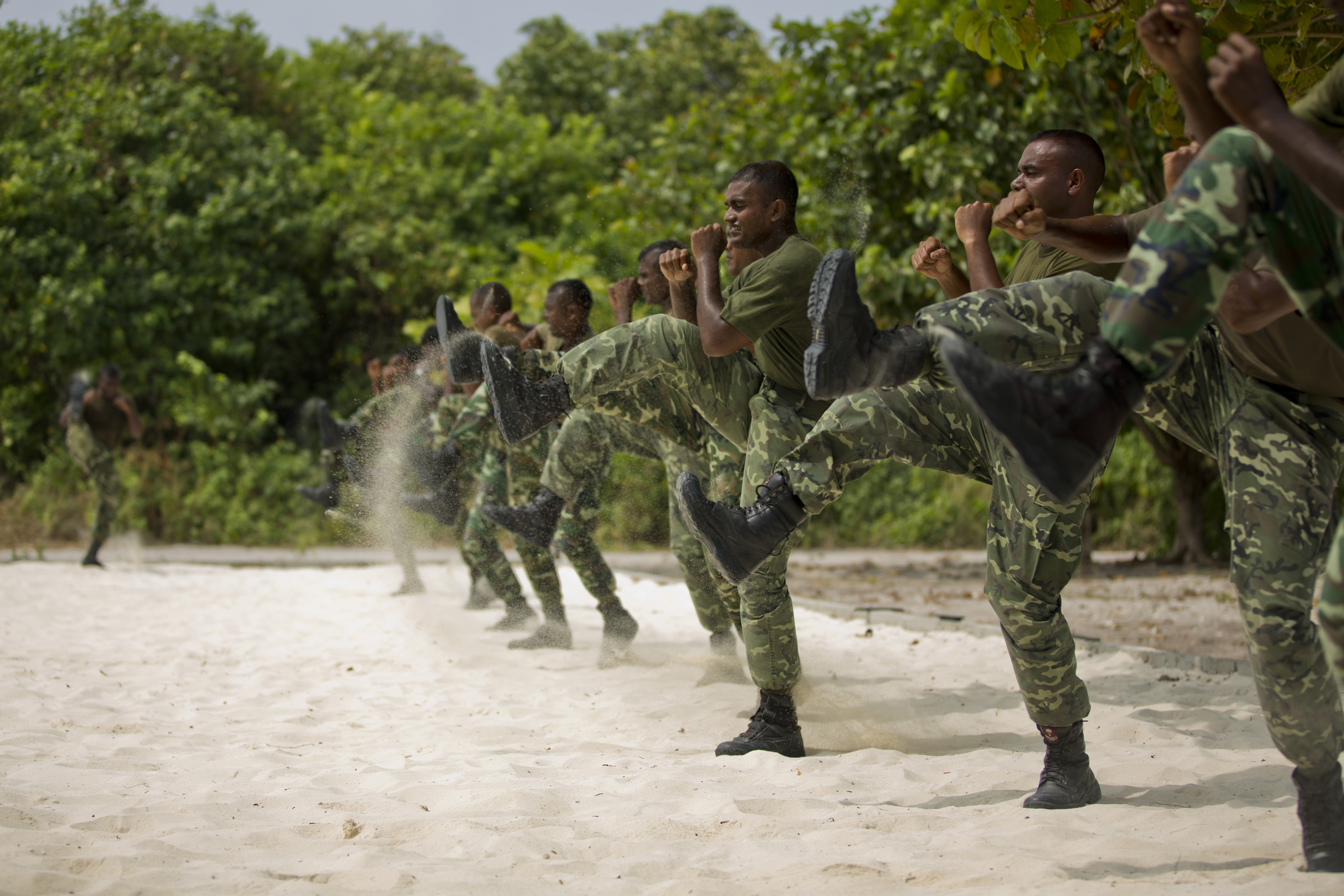
Maldivian marines

The Maldives National Defence Force maintains a frontline ground combat force known as the MNDF Marine Corps. It is divided into Marine Deployment Units (MDUs) which acts as the force projection element MNDF. The MNDF Marine Corps, as a naval unit, works closely with the coast guard of the country.

=== Mexico ===
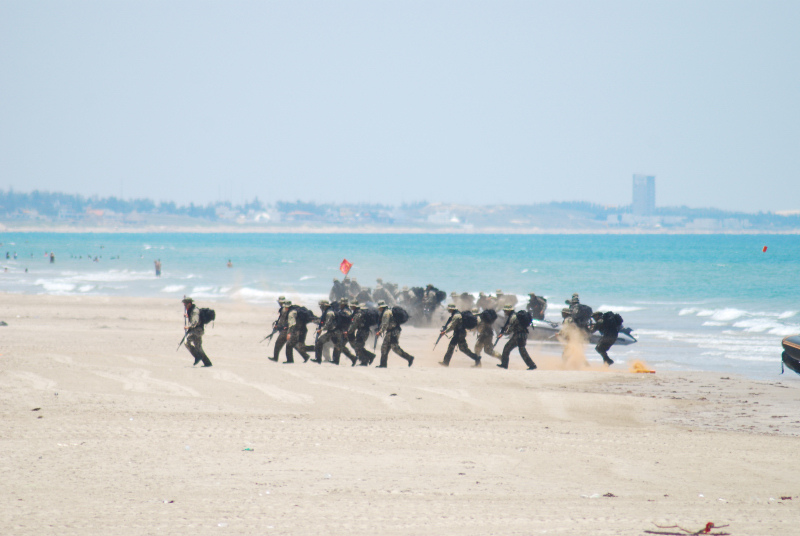
Mexican naval infantry

The Mexican Naval Infantry (Spanish: Infantería de Marina) of the Mexican Navy is responsible for port security, protection of the ten-kilometer coastal fringe, and patrolling major waterways. Tracing their origins in 1821, the marines have light arms, heavy weapons and armored amphibious vehicles. The Navy ceded most of its riverine responsibilities to the Army, reducing the size of the marine force, and deploying them back aboard ships where they play a vital role in drug interdiction and boarding of suspect vessels in territorial waters.

=== Morocco ===
The Royal Moroccan Marines are a naval infantry force subordinated to the Royal Moroccan Navy trained in landing missions and sabotage. The force is between 1,500 and 2,000 troops strong, organized in three battalion-strength units. Among its roles are guarding the southern coast against infiltration by Polisario Front guerrillas.

=== Myanmar ===
The Myanmar Navy raised a naval infantry battalion of 800 men in 1964, followed by a second battalion in 1967. Two more battalions may have also been raised. They were deployed mainly to the Arakan and Tenasserim areas, and to the Irrawaddy delta, to assist in counter-insurgency operations, but also performed other security duties.

=== Namibia ===
Namibian Marine Corps is a battalion-sized infantry unit of the Namibian Navy under the command of a naval captain. Its officers and men are part of the navy and use naval ranks, though insignia is adopted from the Brazilian Marine Corps. The corps is primarily made up of a Rapid Reaction Unit, an Operation Dive team, an operational boat team, and a Special Operations Commando Unit.

=== Netherlands ===
The Netherlands Marine Corps (Korps Mariniers) is a naval infantry unit of the Royal Netherlands Navy, founded in 1665 as an infantry branch of the Dutch States Navy. They saw their first amphibious action in 1667 during the raid on the Medway. The unit's motto is Qua Patet Orbis ("As Far as the World Extends"). Today, it is a brigade approximately 2300 marines strong, consisting of two marine infantry battalions (plus one infantry company which is stationed in Aruba), one amphibious combat support battalion and one logistical battalion. Dutch Marines train in all possible geographical and climate conditions for their role. Enlisted marine recruit training lasts 33 weeks, and marine officers train up to 18 months (including naval academy time). It has its own Special Forces branch known as Netherlands Maritime Special Operations Forces (NLMARSOF).

=== Nigeria ===
The Nigerian Navy Marines represent a specialized, rapid-response branch of the Nigerian Navy, formally established on June 1, 2025. Developed to bridge the operational gap between blue-water naval operations and land-based combat, the unit functions as a Special Operations Capable (SOC) light infantry force designed to secure Nigeria’s littoral spaces, riverine corridors, and critical offshore infrastructure.

=== Norway ===
The Coastal Ranger Command (Kystjegerkommandoen or KJK) of the Norwegian Navy is an amphibious infantry unit trained to operate in littoral combat theatres, as naval infantry and coastal artillery. There is also an SBS type naval commando unit, the Marinejegerkommandoen or MJK. However, with the KJK being a much younger unit than the MJK, the MJK is not under the KJK but rather than the Norwegian Special Operations Command (NORSOCOM) & Royal Norwegian Navy.

=== Pakistan ===
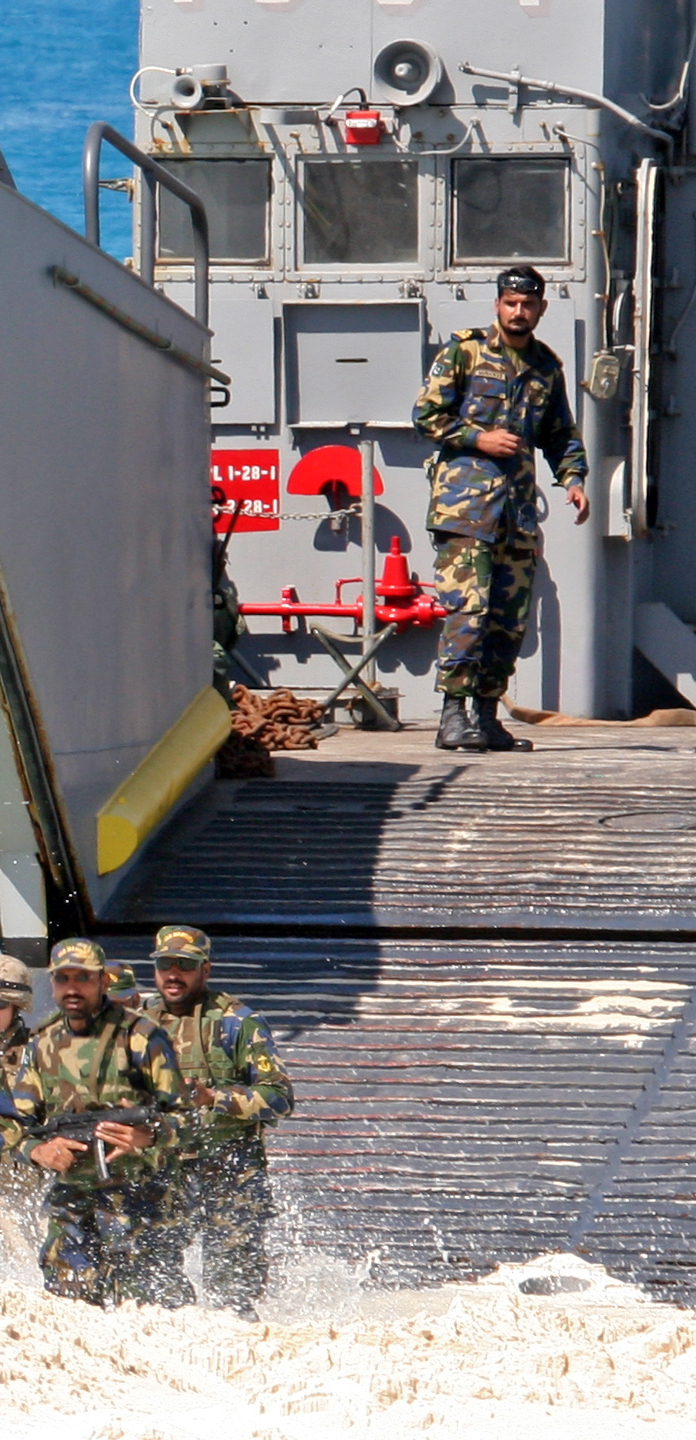
Pakistani marines

The Pakistan Marines Corps of the Pakistan Navy was re-established on April 14, 1990, at a brigade-level size with about 3,600 men. Its current personnel are at a corps-level size with 20,000–30,000 personnel. The marines are based at PNS Qasim naval base.

The Pakistan Navy also has its own Special Service Group-Navy (SSG-N) for the special operation needs the Navy.

=== Paraguay ===
The Paraguayan Marine Corps (Cuerpo de Fusileros Navales) is a battalion-sized organization consisting of four company-sized brigades. In limited cadre form, the marine corps dates from the late 19th century, although it only achieved significant existence when the three-battalion sized Regimiento de Infanteria de Marina Riachuelo was created in the final stages of the Chaco War of 1932–1935.

=== Peru ===
The Peruvian Naval Infantry (Infantería de Marina del Perú) consists of around 3,000 naval infantrymen and includes an amphibious brigade of three battalions and local security units with two transport ships, four tank landing ships, and about forty Chaimite armored personnel carriers. They have seen action in Peru's civil war with the Shining Path.

Since 1982, IMAP detachments have been deployed, under army command, in counter-insurgency operations.

=== Philippines ===
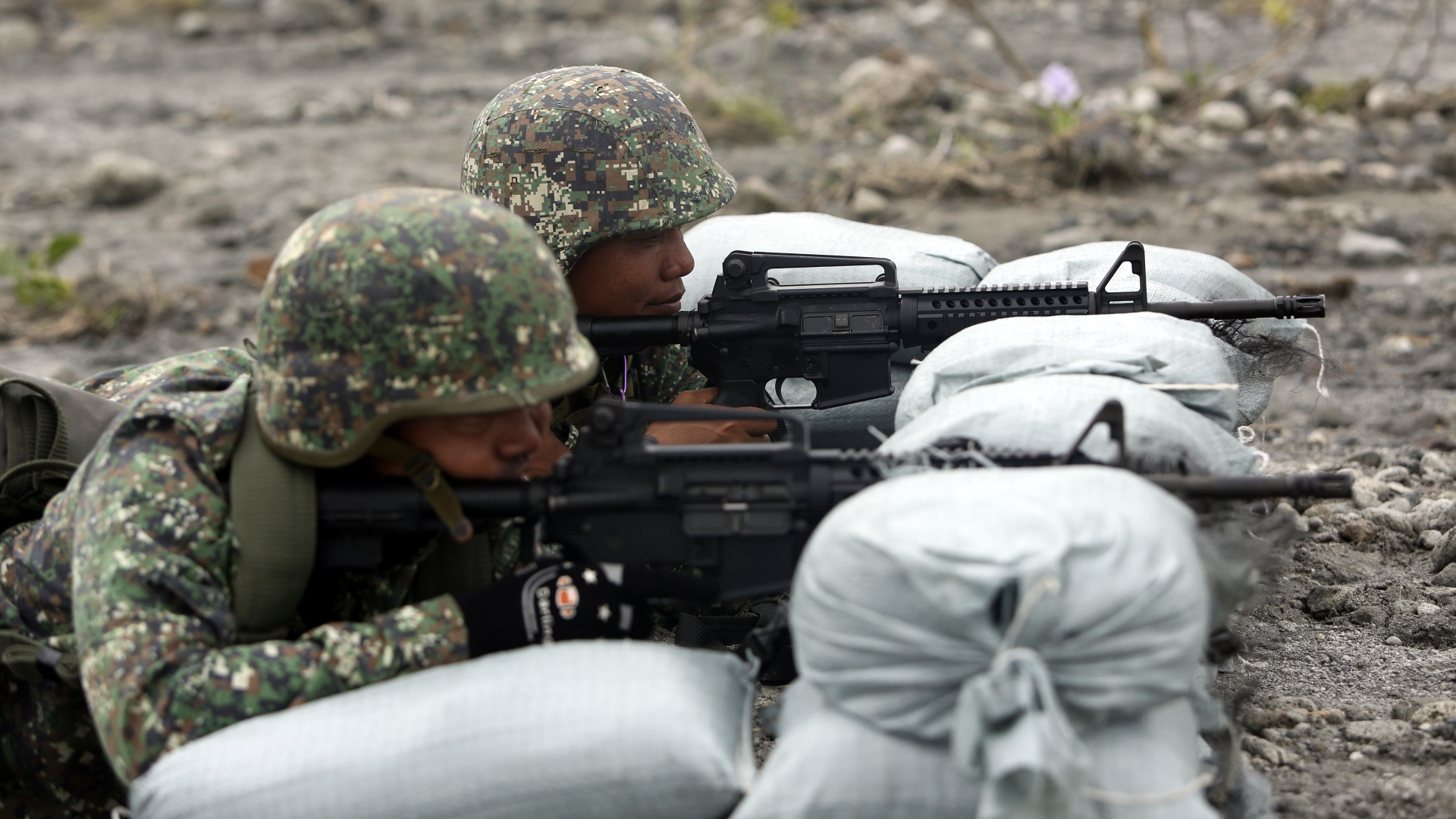
Philippine marines during an assault training exercise

The Philippine Marine Corps (PMC) (Hukbong Kawal Pandagat ng Pilipinas) is the marine corps of the Philippines. It is a naval infantry force under the command of the Philippine Navy. PMC primarily conducts amphibious and expeditionary warfare, as well as special operation missions. It has a strength of about 9,500 men organized into three maneuver brigades, a Combat Service and Support Brigade (CSSB), and independent units such as the Force Reconnaissance Group (FRG) and the Marine Security and Escort Group (MSEG). Formed on November 7, 1950, the Philippine Marine Corps is considered the first and foremost unit to be involved in any amphibious or seaborne clashes.

=== Poland ===
The Polish Navy maintains several naval infantry units responsible for port and coastal security. The Polish Army maintains the 7th Coastal Defense Brigade, which bears traditions of the disbanded 7th Coastal Defence Division (the Blue Berets), therefore it is sometimes referred to as the Marines of Poland. As of 2010 there are no plans by the Polish Army to create an active marine unit. Therefore, the 7th Brigade carries out only limited-scale exercises of amphibious assaults.

=== Portugal ===
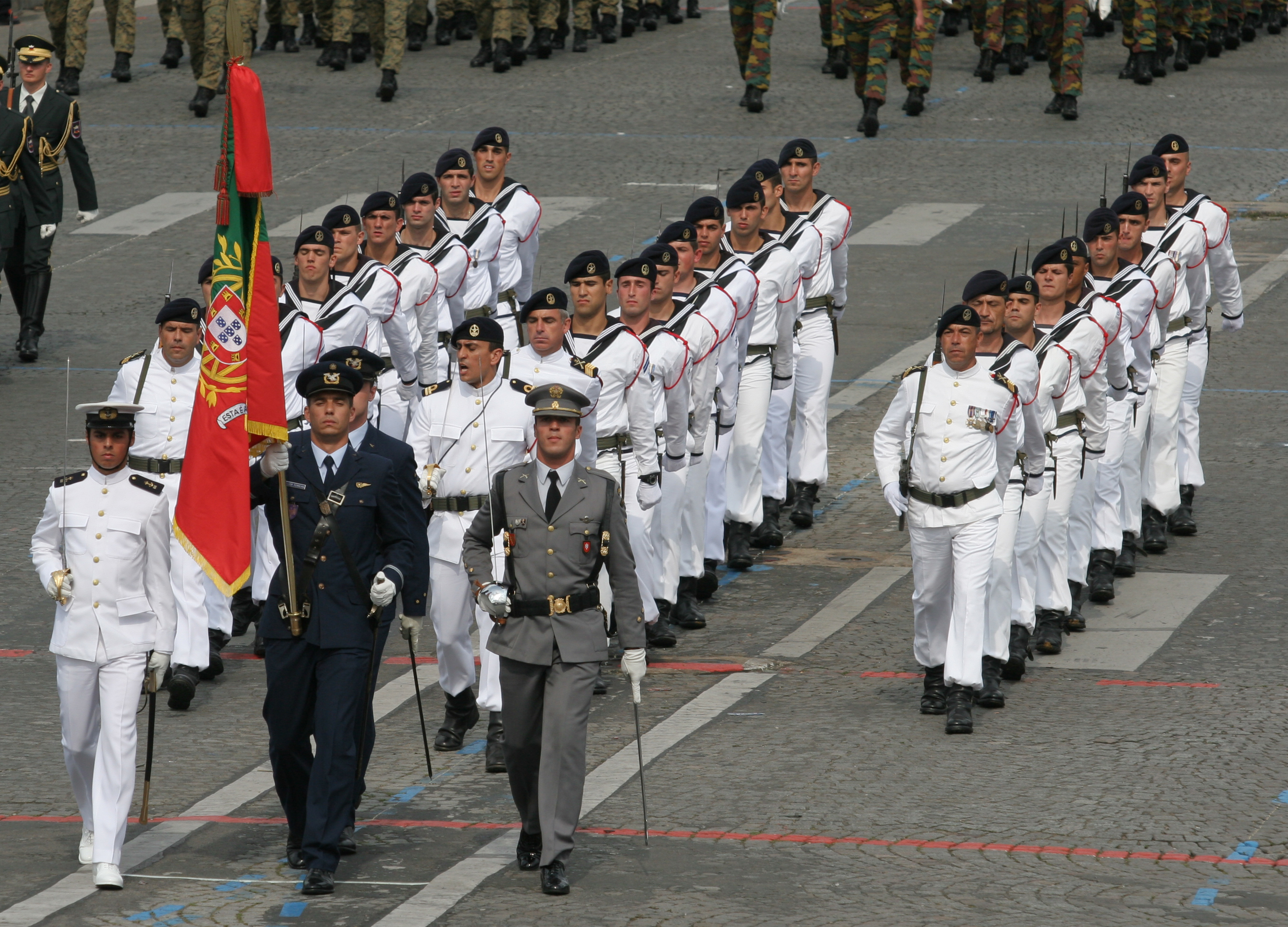
The Portuguese Corpo de Fuzileiros

The second-oldest marine corps in the world was founded as the Terço of the Navy of the Crown of Portugal in 1618. The Portuguese Navy still maintains this Elite Naval Infantry, which is currently known as the Corpo de Fuzileiros. The Corpo de Fuzileiros, meaning literally "Corps of Fusiliers”, is the Elite Infantry and Special Forces unit of the Portuguese Navy.

=== Romania ===
The 307th Marine Infantry Regiment (Regimentul 307 Infanterie Marină) is the light infantry/reconnaissance unit of the Romanian Naval Forces, subordinated to the Romanian Danube Flotilla since 2015. It is located in Babadag, Tulcea County, and was formed on 29 November 1971 as the 307th Marine Infantry Battalion for the defence of the Danube Delta and Romanian Black Sea shore.

=== Russia ===
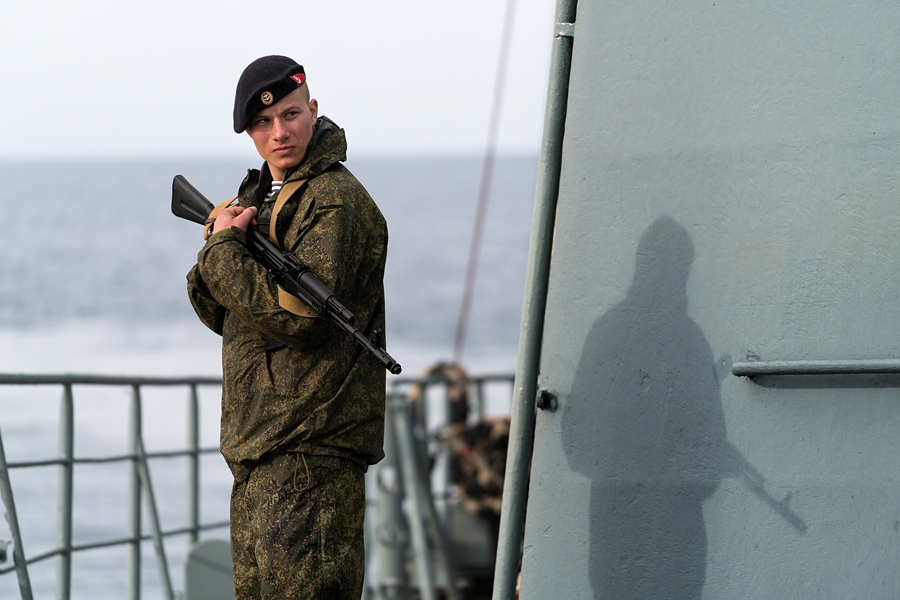
An armed Russian marine aboard a warship in the Mediterranean Sea

The Russian Naval Infantry (Морская пехота) are the amphibious forces of the Russian Armed Forces. The Russian Navy also has the Russian commando frogmen, an elite unit for underwater reconnaissance and special operations.

=== Saudi Arabia ===
The Royal Saudi Navy maintains two, 1,500-man marine brigades consisting of three battalions each. The brigades are assigned to the Western Fleet headquartered in Jeddah and the Eastern Fleet headquartered in Jubail.

=== South Africa ===
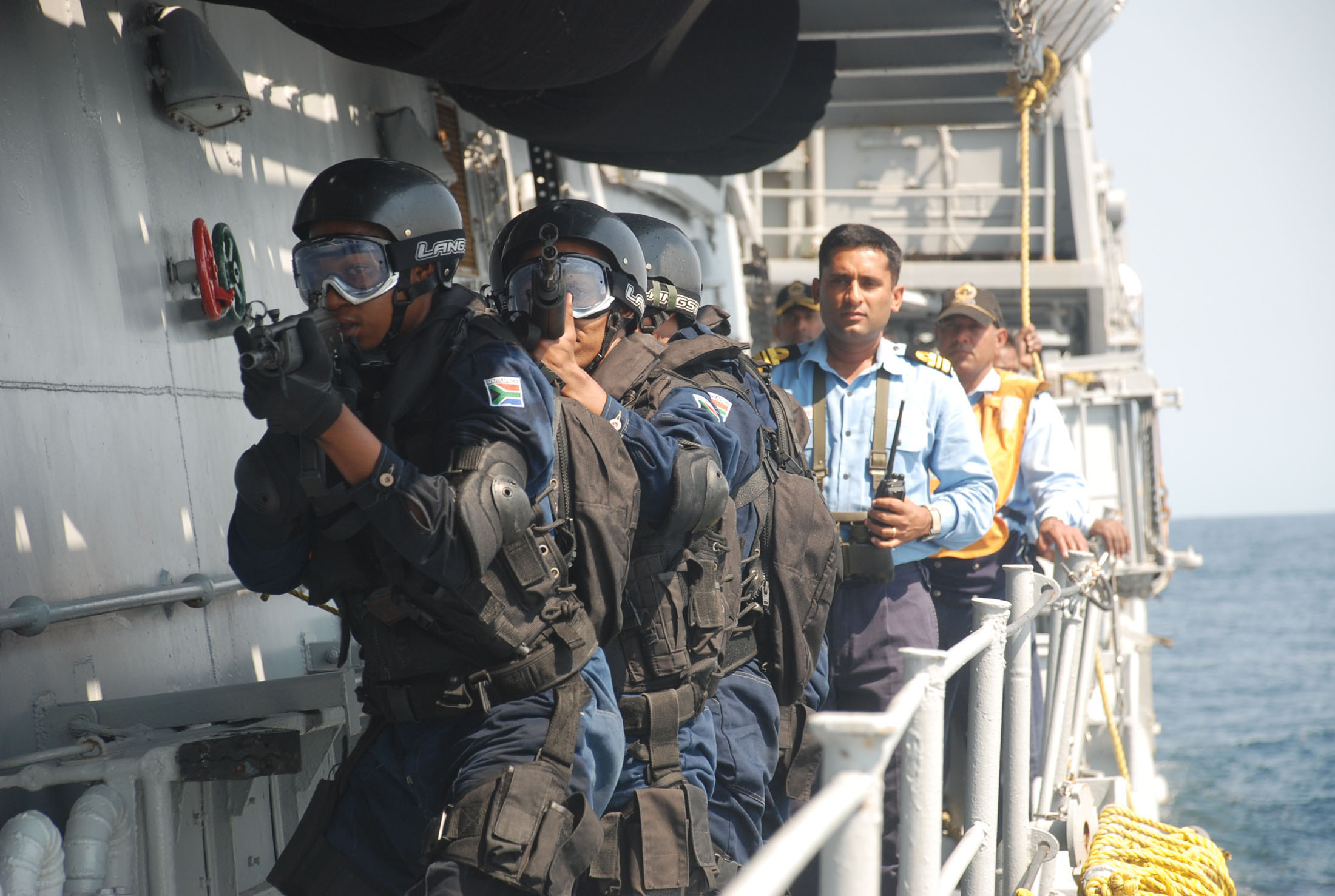
South African marines boarding an Indian warship as part of an exercise

South Africa has not had a dedicated marine branch of its military since the apartheid era. A close analogue would be the South African Navy's Maritime Reaction Squadron, a marine-type unit of four companies. Members are marines and use naval ranks. They are trained in infantry combat up to company sized operations. They are also used for crowd control and conduct peacekeeping operations. During peacekeeping operations they are meant to augment an army infantry battalion. Their role is very similar to the now disbanded South African Marine Corps from the apartheid era. The 4 Special Forces Regiment of the South African Special Forces provides South Africa its seaward Special Forces capability.

=== Spain ===
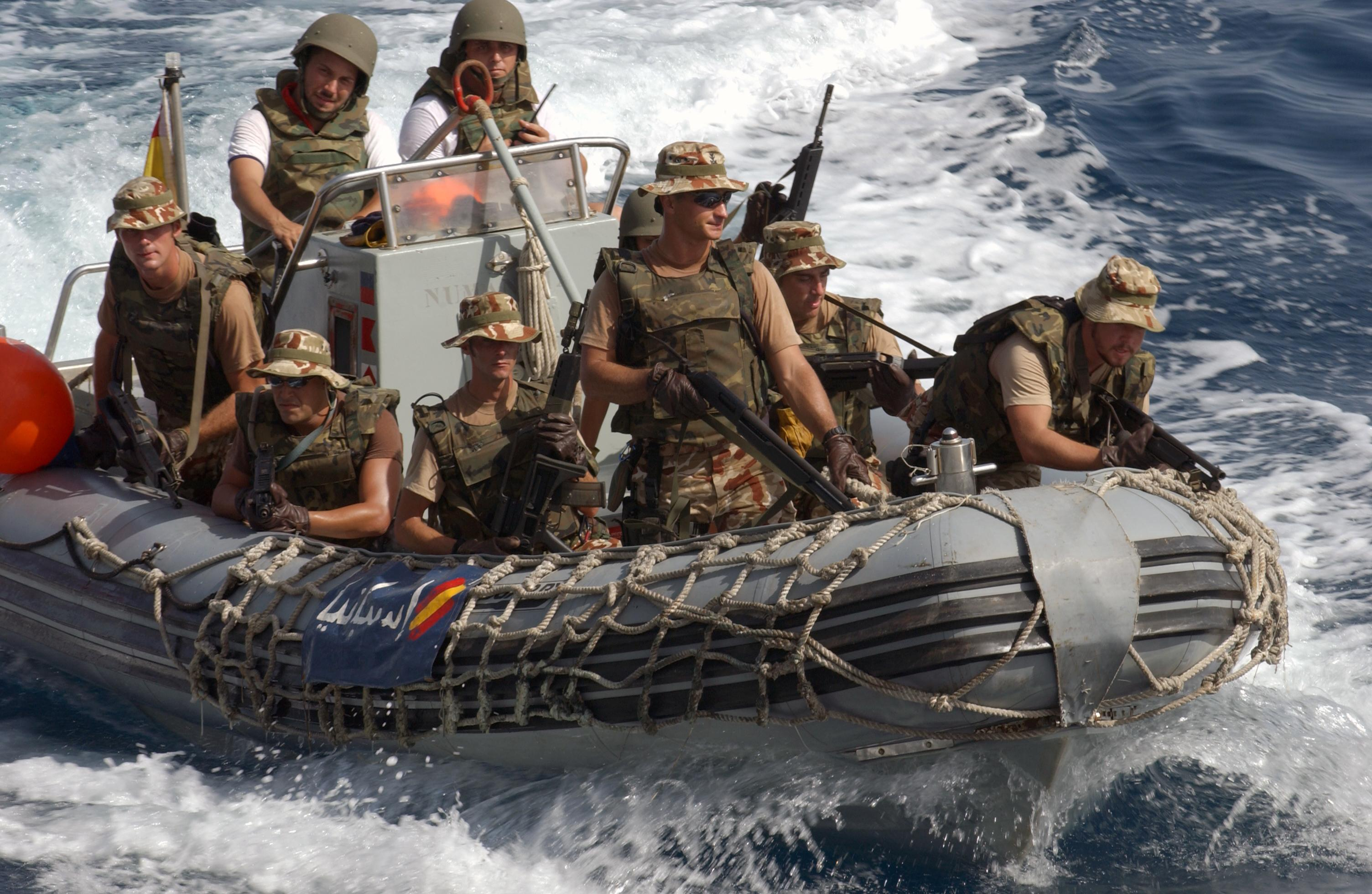
Spanish Navy marines

The Spanish Navy Marines (Infantería de Marina) are the oldest existing marine force in the world, as they were established on February 27, 1537, by Charles I when he permanently assigned the Compañías Viejas del Mar de Nápoles (Naples Sea Old Companies) to the Escuadras de Galeras del Mediterráneo (Mediterranean Galley Squadrons). Their red trouser stripes mark the Infanteria de Marina as part of the Royal Household Corps and were given by Charles III to the marines in reward for their fierce defence of the Castillo del Morro of Havana, Cuba, in 1762.

=== Sri Lanka ===
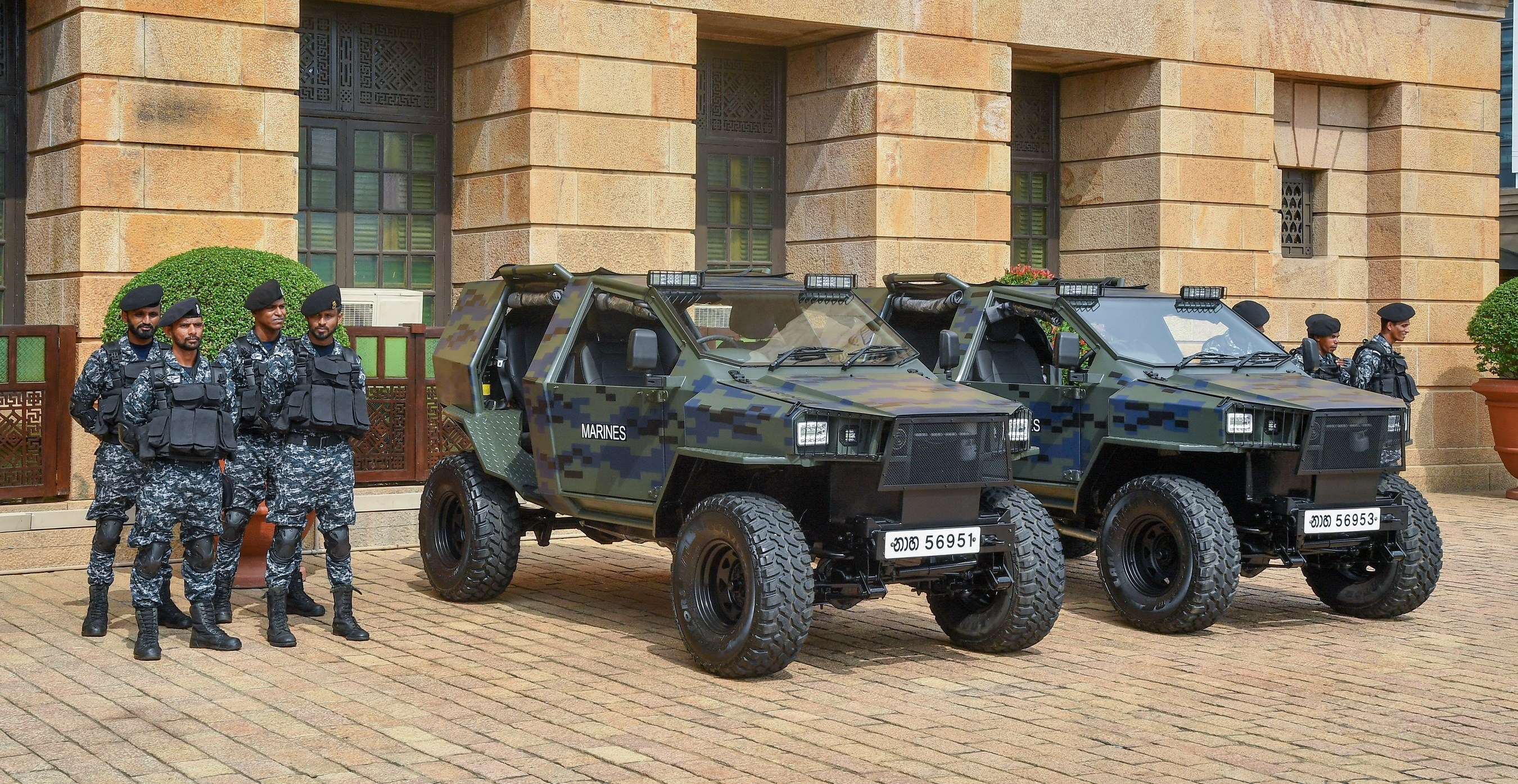
Sri Lankan marines with their Ideal Motors CATV vehicles

The Sri Lanka Navy established its Sri Lanka Marine Corps in November 2016, and the first group of members were assisted in training by the 11th Marine Expeditionary Unit of the United States Marine Corps. The unit became functional after the first group of members consisting of 6 officers and 158 sailors graduated from training on 27 February 2017.

=== Sweden ===
The Swedish Amphibious Corps (Svenska amfibiekåren) is an arm of the Swedish Navy. The corps consists of two regiments each comprising one amphibious battalion, tasked with reconnaissance, amphibious assaults, and combat on, over, and under the surface of the sea.

=== Syria ===
The Fouj Al-Mughawayr Al-Bahir (فوج المغاوير البحر meaning "Marines Regiment") is a unit based in Latakia Governorate. It has participated in operations in the Syrian Civil War.

=== Taiwan ===
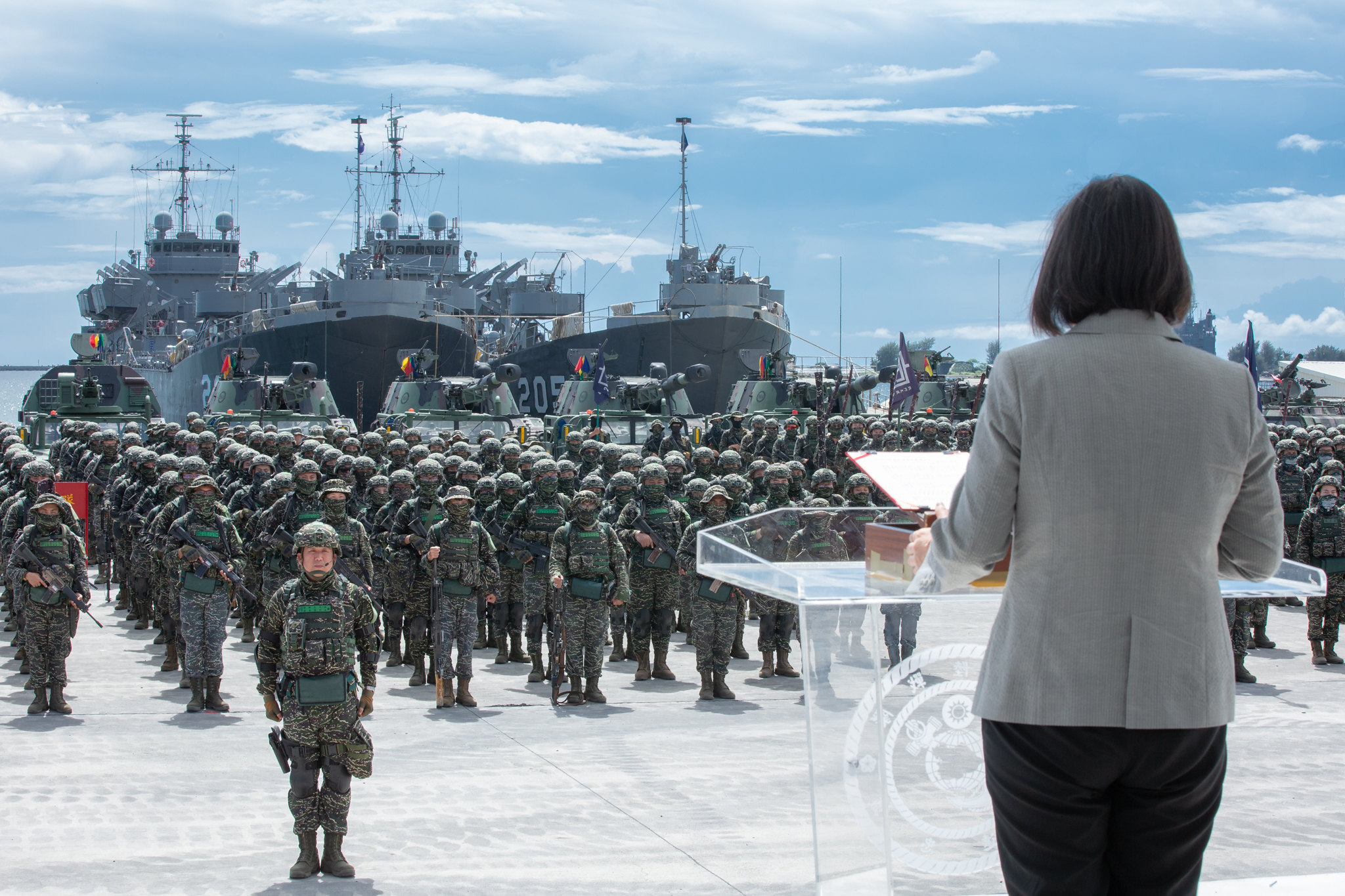
President of Taiwan Tsai Ing-wen reviewing a marine battalion

Officially the Republic of China but referred to colloquially as Taiwan, the state's military has a naval infantry force known by the English name the Republic of China Marine Corps which was established in 1914 in mainland China following the 1911 Revolution and is the amphibious branch of the Republic of China Navy. It fled with the other ROC forces to Formosa following the Kuomintang's defeat in the Chinese Civil War. They are responsible for amphibious combat, counter-landing, reinforcement of Taiwan and surrounding islands (such as Kinmen, Wuchiu, Matsu Islands, Pratas Island, etc.), and defense of Naval facilities. It also functions as a rapid reaction force (special service company) and a strategic reserve.

=== Thailand ===
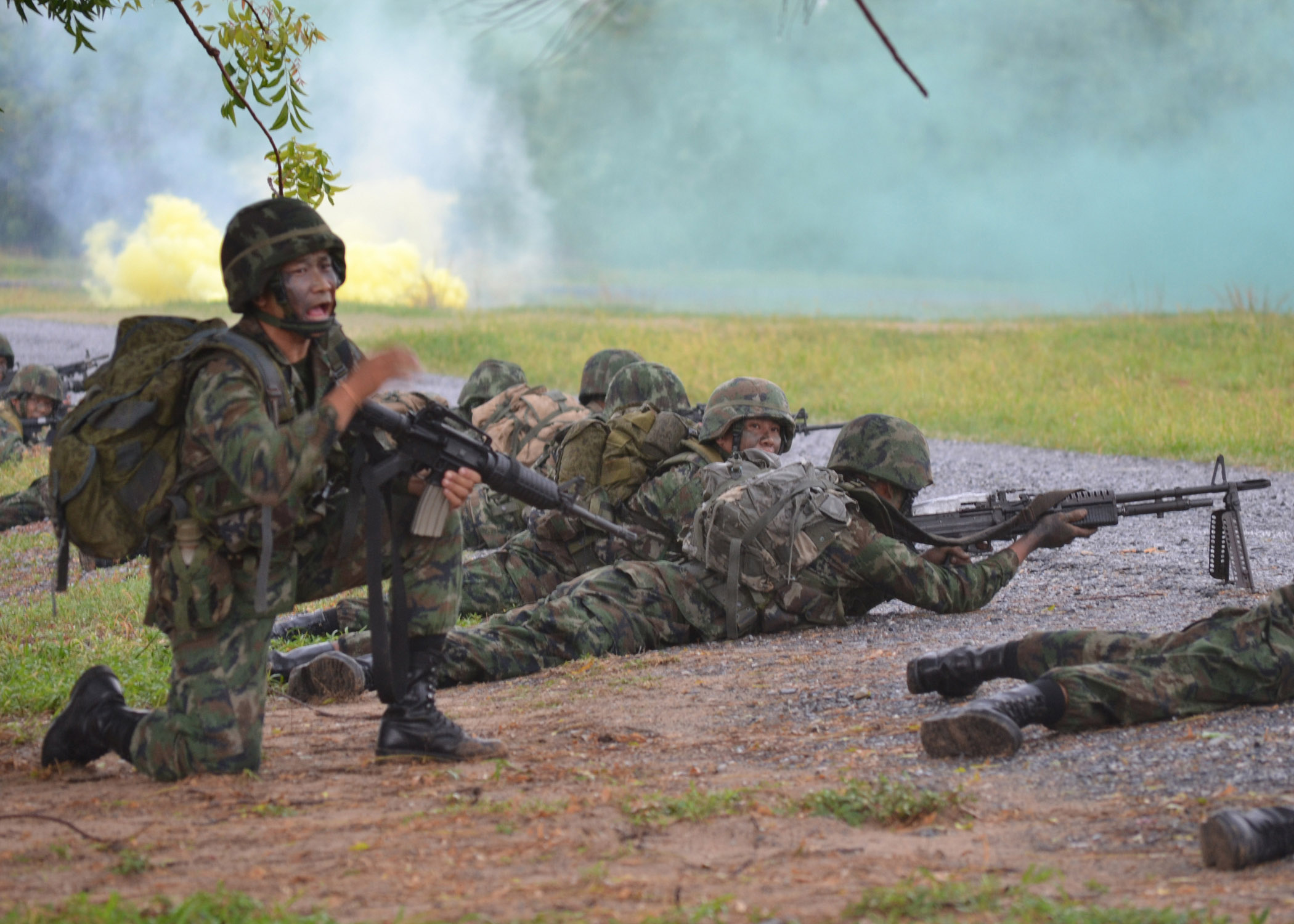
Royal Thai Marines during an amphibious assault as part of CARAT 2011

Royal Thai Marine Corps (RTMC) is the naval infantry subbranch of the Royal Thai Navy. The Royal Thai Marine Corps was founded in 1932, when the first battalion was formed with the assistance of the United States Marine Corps. It was expanded to a regiment in 1940 and was in action against communist guerrillas throughout the 1950s and 1960s. During the 1960s, the United States Marine Corps assisted in its expansion into a brigade. The Royal Thai Marine Corps saw action on the Malaysian border in the 1970s and has now been increased to four brigades.

=== Tonga ===
The Royal Tongan Marines is a sub-unit of the Tongan Land Force, which itself is a branch of the His Majesty's Armed Forces of Tonga. It is a Company sized group composed of a Headquarters and three Light Infantry Platoons.

=== Turkey ===
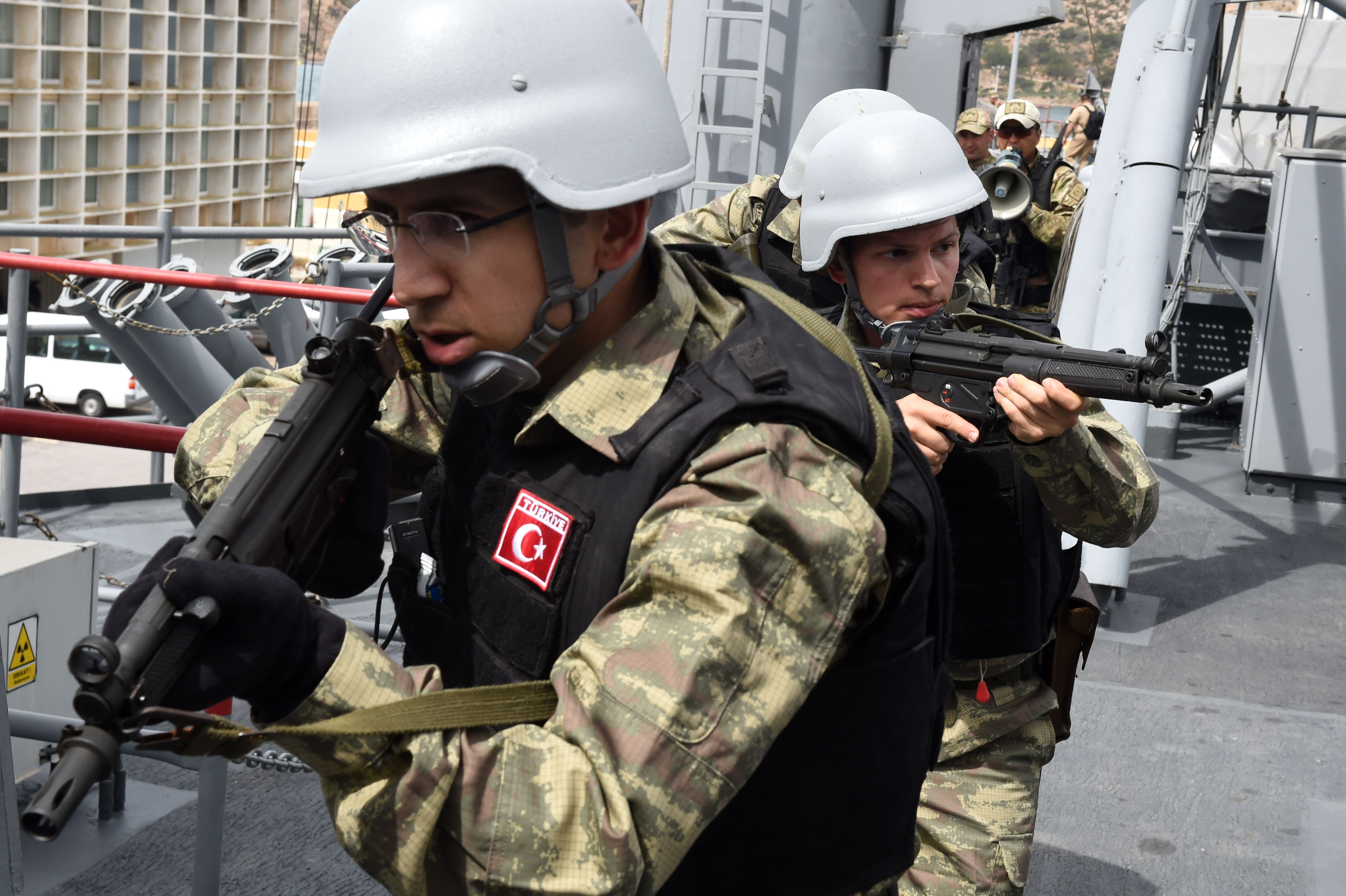
Turkish marine boarding teams

The Amphibious Marine Infantry Brigade Command is the marine force of the Turkish Naval Forces and consists of 4,500 men based in Foça near İzmir.

=== Ukraine ===
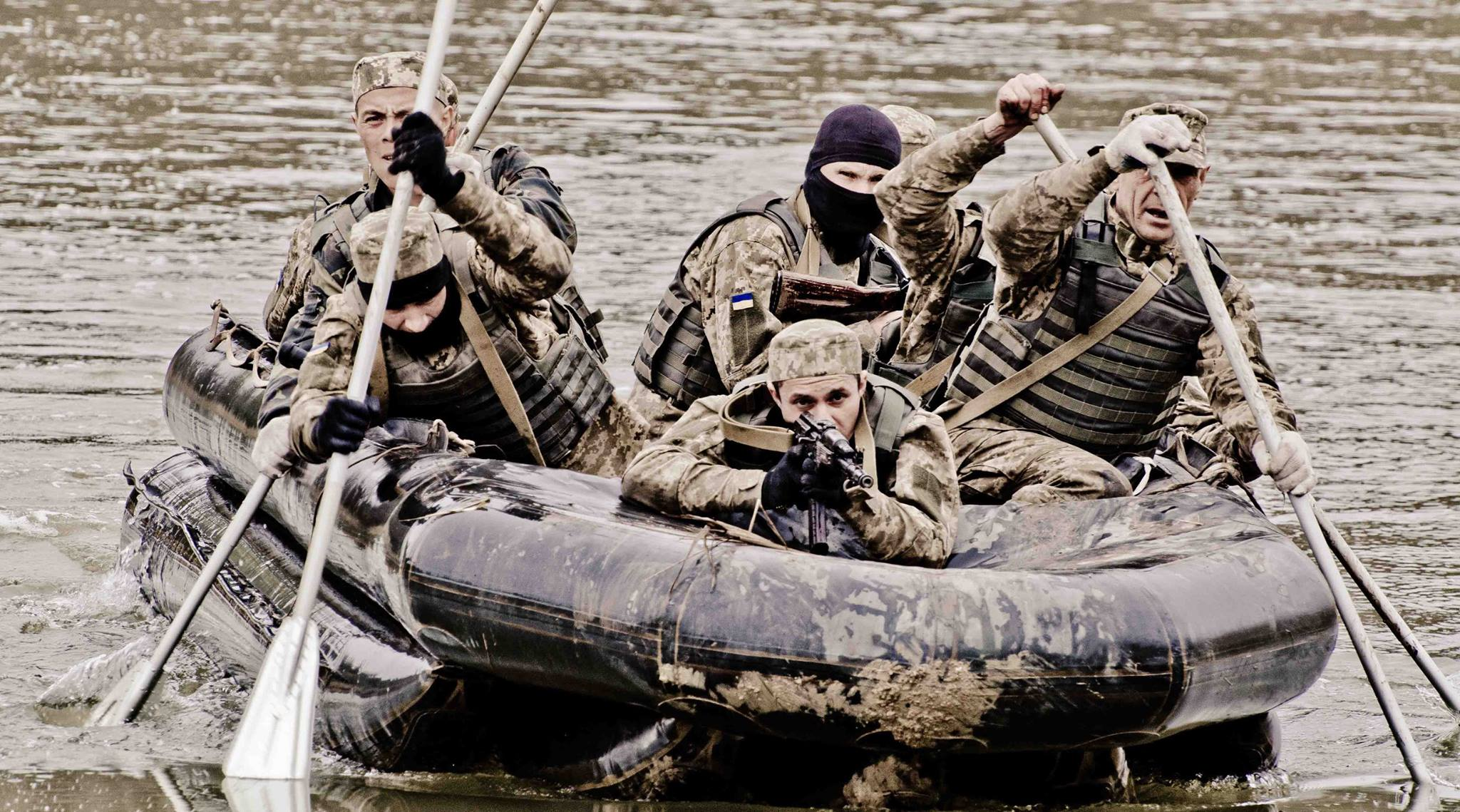
Ukrainian naval infantry

The Ukrainian Marine Corps was founded in 1993 from a unit of the former Soviet Naval Infantry. It served as a coastal defense force of the Ukrainian Navy until 23 May 2023 when it was elevated into a service branch of the Armed Forces of Ukraine. The branch is based in Mykolaiv.

=== United Kingdom ===
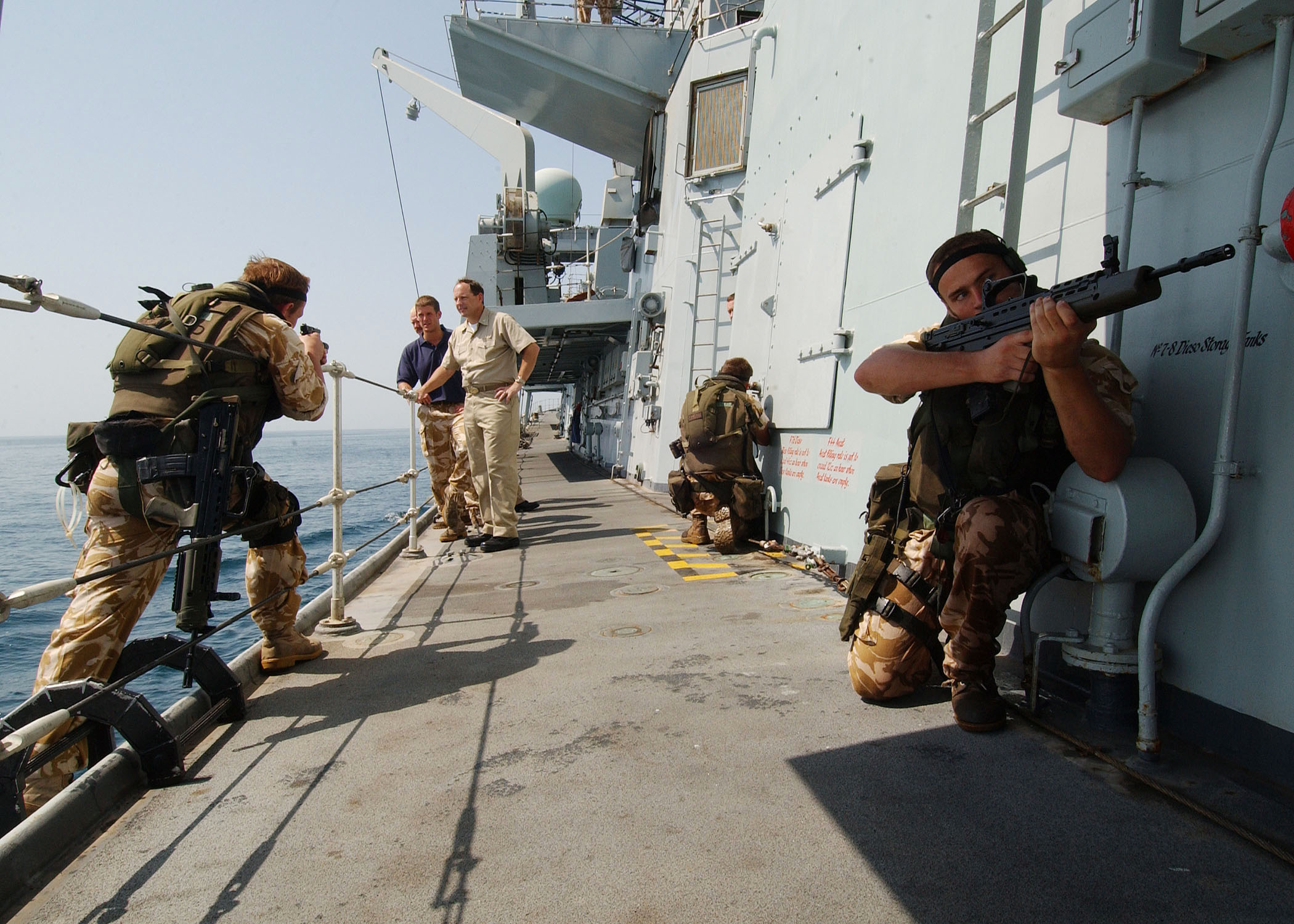
Boarding procedures demonstrated by the British Royal Marines

The Royal Marines (RM) were formed in 1664 and are part of HM Naval Service. They include an amphibious brigade (which includes commando-trained units and individual personnel from the British Army, Royal Navy and Royal Air Force), a naval security unit responsible for guarding the UK's naval nuclear weapons and other security duties, a landing craft and boat-training group which is also a parent unit for three landing craft units deployed on amphibious warfare ships; and a naval musical branch. The RM has close international ties with allied marine forces, particularly the United States Marine Corps and the Netherlands Marine Corps/Korps Mariniers. "Marine" is also used as a rank in the Royal Marines, being equivalent to an army private. The Royal Marines Reserve (RMR) is the volunteer reserve force used to augment the regular Royal Marines in times of war or national crisis.

=== United States ===
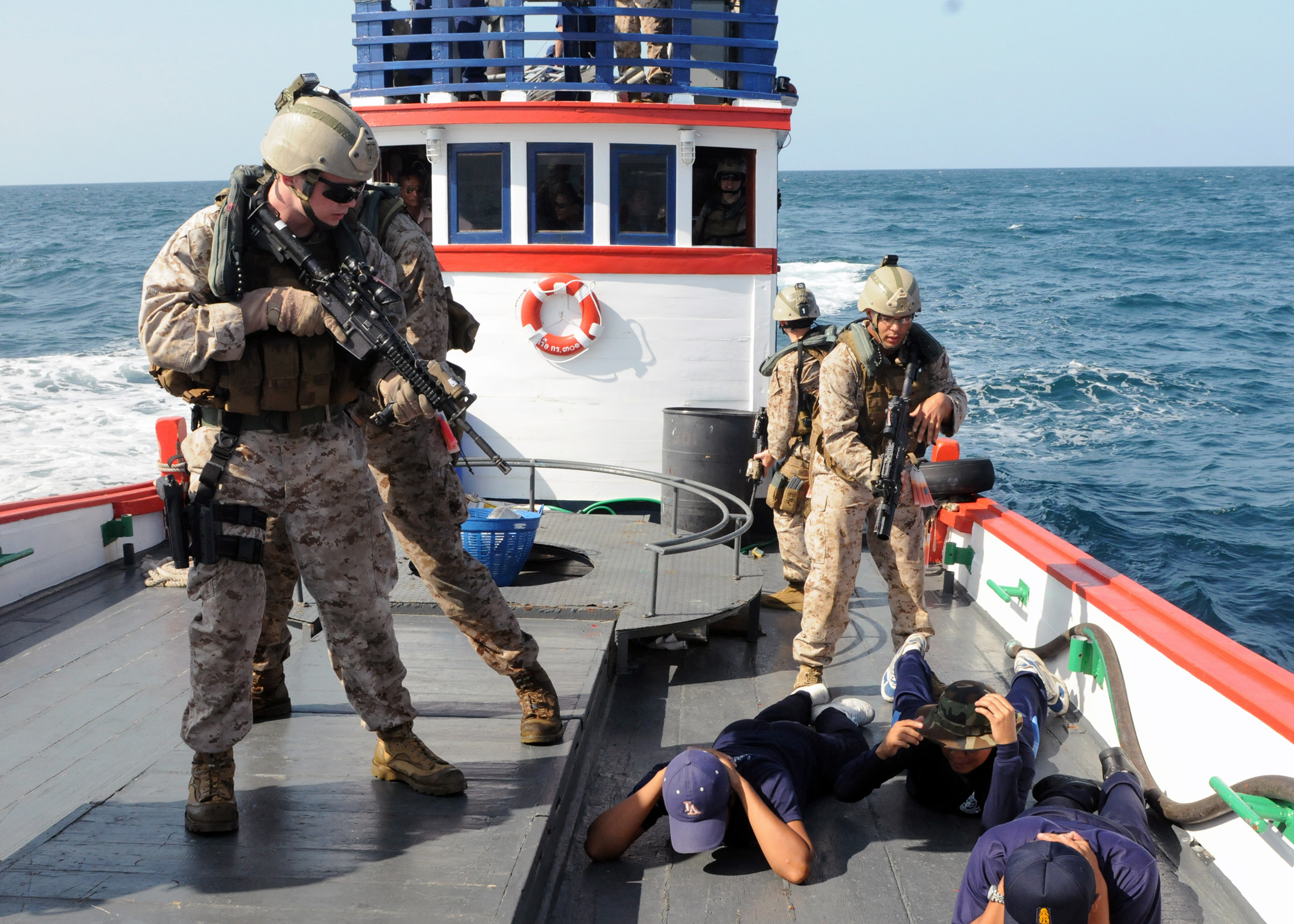
U.S. Marines Fleet Anti-terrorism Security Team conducting an exercise aboard a fishing vessel

The United States Marine Corps (USMC) is currently the only marine combined-arms force in the world. Created in 1775, it was originally intended only to guard naval vessels during the American Revolutionary War. The USMC is a component part of the US Department of the Navy in the military command structure, with its own representative on the Joint Chiefs of Staff. The corps’ major functions include the seizure or defense of advanced naval bases and land operations essential to a naval campaign, providing detachments and organizations for service on armed vessels of the Navy and security detachments for the protection of naval property at naval stations and bases, and such other duties since the president may direct and develop those phases of amphibious operations that pertain to the tactics, technique, and equipment used by landing forces. It also has other missions, including providing personnel as security guards at US diplomatic missions, and providing helicopter transportation for the President of the United States aboard Marine One. The United States Marine Corps Reserve (USMCR) is the reserve force of the United States Marine Corps.

=== Uruguay ===
The Uruguayan Marine Corps (Cuerpo de Fusileros Navales or FUSNA) is a battalion-sized organization. However, given its small size, it is not a separate corps within the Navy, but regular naval officers are posted to the Marines as to any other Navy unit.

=== Venezuela ===
The Venezuelan Marine Corps (Infantería de Marina) is a subdivision of the Venezuelan Navy. Headquartered in Meseta de Mamo, Vargas, the estimated numerical strength of this unit is approximately 8,000 men and women. Its mission is to "enlist and direct its units in order to form the disembarking force and/or support of amphibious or special operations; executing naval safeguarding and environmental policing, as well as actively participating in the national development".

=== Vietnam ===
The Vietnam People's Navy maintains a naval infantry force (Vietnamese: Hải quân Đánh bộ; 海軍打步). It traces its roots during the Vietnam War following the model of the Đặc công sappers but with amphibious capabilities. It first saw action as an official naval infantry force during the Cambodian–Vietnamese War when it ousted the Khmer Rouge from power. It once stood at eleven brigades each of several battalions. Currently the Vietnam People's Navy maintains two naval infantry brigades.

=== Yemen ===
The very small Yemeni Navy of the Republic of Yemen maintained a small component of Naval Infantry marines. Prior to the outbreak of the civil war, the marine component was deployed in the capacity of supporting the navy’s maritime security & coastal defense efforts which includes supporting the Yemeni Coast Guard’s anti-narcotics operations. But as a result of the outbreak of the civil war with much of the navy defecting to side with the Houthis, it has significantly impacted their already limited capabilities & effectiveness in their service to the Republic of Yemen.

== Historical marine forces ==
=== Ancient Greece ===
The ancient Greek states did not possess specialized marine infantry; instead, they used hoplites and archers as an onboard contingent (epibatai).

=== Ancient Rome ===
The Roman Navy used regular infantry as marines. Naval personnel were trained for raiding and also provided the troops for at least two legions (I Adiutrix and II Adiutrix) for service on land. The various provincial fleets were usually provided with marines from the adjacent legions.

=== Australia ===
Several of the Colonial navies of Australia raised volunteer naval infantry and naval militia brigades in the second half of the 19th century. Following the Federation of Australia they were combined into the Commonwealth Naval Militia. With the formation of the Royal Australian Navy in 1911 they were renamed the Royal Australian Naval Brigade. At its peak in 1915 it numbered 2,817 officers and men. The Naval Brigade was disbanded in 1920 and volunteers were absorbed into the Royal Australian Naval Reserve.

=== Austrian/Austro-Hungarian Empire ===
Though overshadowed by its Prussian counterpart, the Marinier-Korps, as well as naval powers like the British, the French, the Spanish, and the Italians, Austria-Hungary maintained a small regiment of naval infantrymen dating back to Venetian times alongside the then Austrian Imperial Navy's “Corps of Sailors” (Matrosencorps). However, in 1868, as part of his naval reforms, then Commander Wilhelm von Tegetthoff abolished the Naval Infantry Regiment and the Naval Artillery Corps in favor of an enlarged and all-encompassing Matrosencorps as by that point, no marines had served aboard a ship for 10 years, and so from that point on, sailors not serving on active warships received infantry drills and took up naval infantry duties.

=== Byzantine Empire ===
For several centuries, the Byzantine navy used the descendants of the Mardaites, who were settled in southern Anatolia and Greece, as marines and rowers for its ships. Emperor Basil I also established a separate marine regiment, 4,000 strong, for the central Imperial Fleet based at Constantinople. These were professional troops, and were counted among the elite tagmata. In the 1260s, when emperor Michael VIII Palaiologos rebuilt the navy, he recruited the Tzakones (settlers from Laconia) and the Gasmouloi (men of mixed Greek-Latin descent) as special marine troops. Despite the progressive decline and virtual disappearance of the navy, they remained active until the late Palaiologan period.

=== Sangkum era Kingdom of Cambodia/Khmer Republic ===
The Cambodian Marine Corps, or Corps de Fusiliers-Marins Khmères (CFMK), was founded in 1960 was initially the naval infantry unit of the 1st Kingdom of Cambodia of 1953–1970 under the Royal Khmer Navy of the Royal Khmer Armed Forces (FARK). After Lon Nol’s coup of 1970, FARK was reorganised to be Khmer National Armed Forces (FANK) and the naval infantry came under the jurisdiction of the Khmer National Navy (MNK).

The naval infantry took part in the Cambodian Civil War against the Khmer Rouge but was dissolved along with the rest of the Khmer National Armed Forces when the Khmer Republic were defeated and capitulated to the Khmer Rouge.

=== Qing China ===
The Qing dynasty‘s Beiyang Fleet of the Imperial Chinese Navy maintained a small naval infantry force which at its height reached the size of 300 marines. The marines distinguished themselves visually by their red uniforms as opposed to the regular Beiyang Fleet’s Navy personnels who wear their white dress uniforms for the summer & autumn, and blue dress uniform for the winter & spring.

On top of their role as Naval Infantrymen, the Beiyang Fleet marines also took on the fleet's firefighting & military policing duties.

The marines saw action at the end of the year following the official end of the First Sino-Japanese War when they attempted to retake Nanbang Fort (南幫炮台) from Japanese forces after it was attacked on Christmas Day of 1895 by an attacking force of 30,000 Japanese with 6,000 Chinese defending the fort; which subsequently fell to Japanese forces on December 29, 1895. Being greatly outnumbered and lacking heavy weapons, the marines failed to dislodge the Japanese from the fort.

==== Manchukuo ====
Following the 1911 Revolution and the collapse of the Qing dynasty's rule over China followed by its puppeting by the Empire of Japan resulting from Japan's 1931-1932 invasion of Manchuria as part of Japan's imperial expansion into China, the Japanese carved out the state of Manchukuo from the former territories of Manchuria for former Emperor of Qing China; Puyi, to rule over as a puppet Emperor of Manchukuo to Japan.

As a result of the surrender of naval assets in the region (then under the jurisdiction of the Kuomintang) under the command of Captain Yin Zuqian (尹祚乾) at Harbin as a result of the invasion, the ships Captain Yin surrendered (which at the time consisted of five river gunboats) eventually became the foundation of the Manchukuo Imperial Navy.

The Manchukuo Imperial Navy maintained a naval infantry force of 300 marines. The Manchukuo Marines (滿洲國海軍陸戰隊) were modeled after the naval infantry force of the former Beiyang Fleet's Marines.

=== Denmark-Norway ===
Marineregimentet (The Marine Regiment) was the naval infantry of the Royal Dano-Norwegian Navy. Leading up to the Denmark–Norway union in 1814, the unit moved to Rendsburg and changed its name to Bornholm Infantry Regiment in 1741 and fell under the jurisdiction of the Royal Danish Army becoming a regular infantry unit. The Bornholm Infantry Regiment continued to exist until its disbandment in 2000.

=== Dutch Republic ===
The corps was founded on 10 December 1665 during the Second Anglo-Dutch War by the unofficial leader of the republic, Johan de Witt, and Admiral Michiel de Ruyter as the Regiment de Marine. Its leader was Willem Joseph Baron van Ghent. The Dutch had successfully used ordinary soldiers in ships at sea in the First Anglo-Dutch War. It was the fifth European marine unit formed, being preceded by the Spanish Marines (1537), the Portuguese Marines (1610), the French Marines (1622) and the English Royal Marines (1664). Like Britain, the Netherlands has had several periods when its Marines were disbanded. The Netherlands itself was under French occupation or control from 1810 until 1813. A new marine unit was raised on 20 March 1801 during the time of the Batavian Republic and on 14 August 1806 the Korps Koninklijke Grenadiers van de Marine was raised under King Louis Bonaparte. The modern Korps Mariniers dates from 1814, receiving its current name in 1817.

The battle honors on the Korps Mariniers' colors are: Raid on the Medway (1667), Kijkduin (1673), Sennefe (1674), Spain, Dogger Bank (1781), West Indies, Algiers (1816), Atjeh, Bali, Rotterdam (1940), Java Sea (1942), Java and Madoera (1947–1948), New Guinea (1962) and Cambodia (1992–1993).

=== Estonia ===
The Meredessantpataljon, was a short-lived infantry battalion of the Estonian Navy. The battalion was created in 1919 from the crews of the Estonian surface warships and was based in Tallinn. The unit was mainly used on the Southern Front during the Estonian War of Independence. The unit was operational from March to June in 1919.

=== France ===
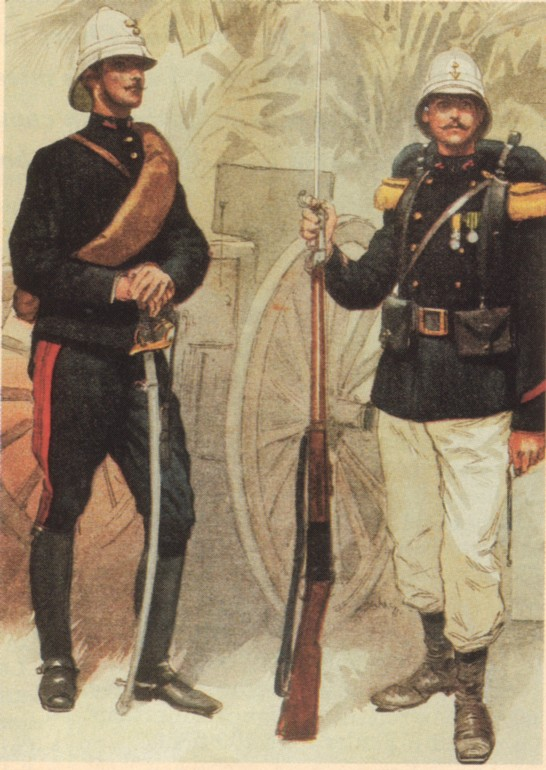
Troupes de marine

The Troupes de marine were founded in 1622 (as compagnies ordinaires de la mer) as land forces under the control of the Secretary of State of the Navy, notably for operations in French Canada. The Compagnies de la Mer were transformed in line infantry regiments by Napoleon, but became once more marine forces in 1822 (for the artillery) and 1831 (for the infantry). These Troupes de marines were in the 19th century the main overseas and colonial forces of the French military. In 1900 they were put under the orders of the War Ministry and took the name of Troupes Coloniales (Colonial Forces). In 1958 the designation of Troupes Coloniales was changed to Troupes d'Outre-Mer (Overseas Forces) but in 1961 it reverted to the original Troupes de marine. Throughout these changes in title, these troops continued to be part of the French Army.

=== Gran Colombia ===
The Federation of Gran Colombia Marines were formed in 1822 and were disbanded in 1829, Personnel were mostly from Venezuela.

=== Imperial/Nazi/East Germany ===
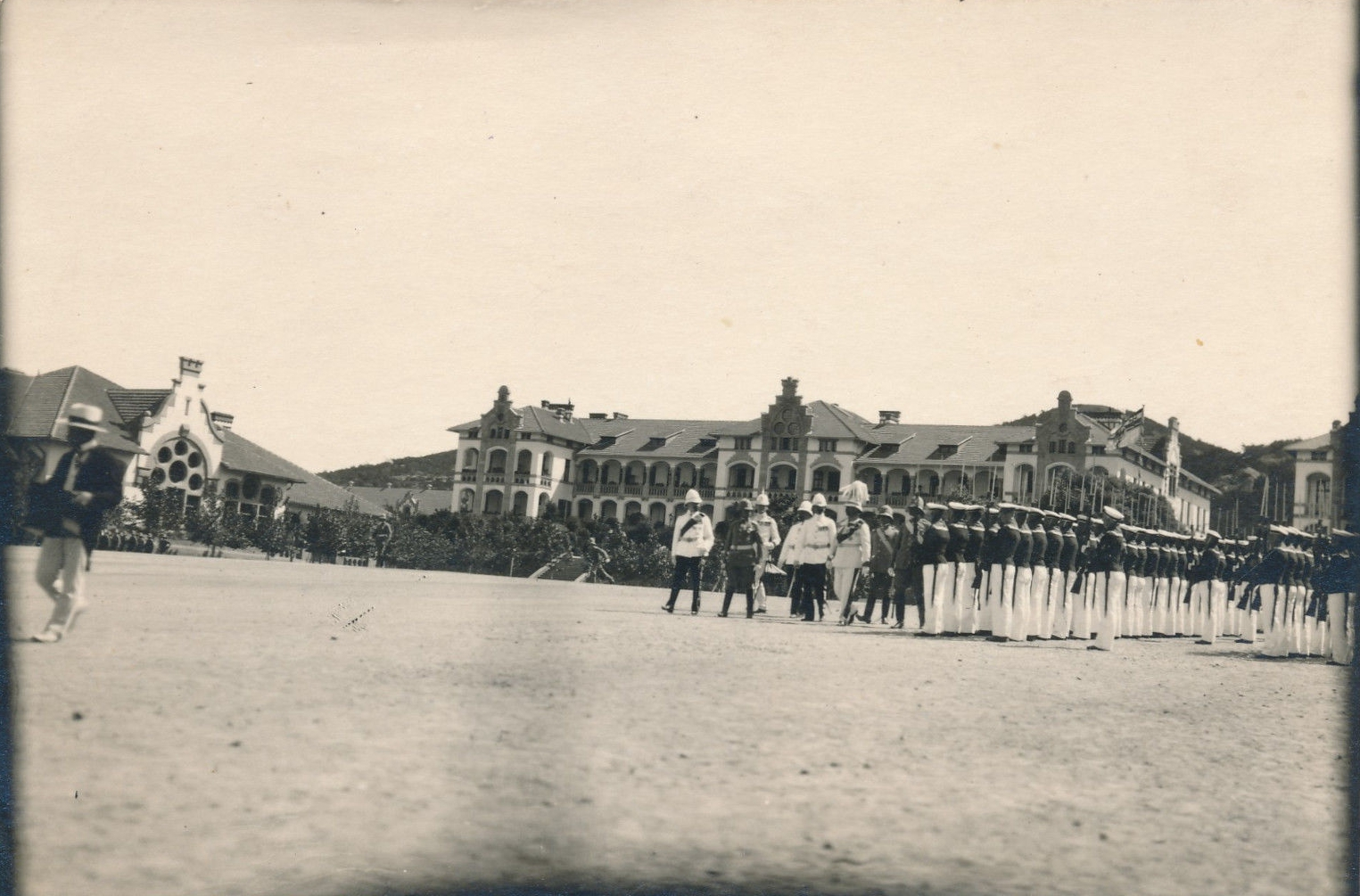
German Seebataillone formation at Qingdao

- German Empire: During the German Imperial era, three ‘sea battalions’ or Seebataillone based at Kiel, Wilhelmshaven and Tsingtao were maintained. These units served intermittently as colonial intervention forces. The III Seebataillon at the imperial navy's east Asian station at Tsingtao was the only all-German unit with permanent status in a protectorate/colony. The battalion fought at the Siege of Tsingtao.
- Nazi Germany: The Marinestosstruppkompanie, was a naval infantry of Kriegsmarine in the Second World War.
- East Germany (GDR): The East German army's Nr29. Regiment ("Ernst Moritz Arndt") was a Motorized Rifle Regiment intended for amphibious operations in the Baltic Sea; while the Volksmarine Kampfschwimmer: Combat swimmer units were intended for support of amphibious operations and for raiding.

=== Iran ===
- At the time of the Iranian Revolution in 1979, the Imperial Iranian Navy had three battalions of marines.

=== Iraq ===
- The old Ba'athist-era Iraqi Navy maintained several marine companies.
- The Iraqi Republican Guard maintained a Marine Brigade as part of its 8th As Saiqa Special Forces Division. The brigade was equipped with Brazilian-made Engesa EE-11 Urutu wheeled armored personnel carriers.

=== Fascist/Kingdom of Italy ===
The Blackshirt militia maintained an independent Marine Group with four MVSN battalions (24th, 25th, 50th and 60th).

The Decima Flottiglia MAS was an Italian flotilla, with commando frogman unit, of the Regia Marina (Italian Royal Navy).

The 3rd Marine Infantry Division "San Marco" was an Italian division raised by Mussolini's Italian Social Republic.

=== Imperial Japan ===
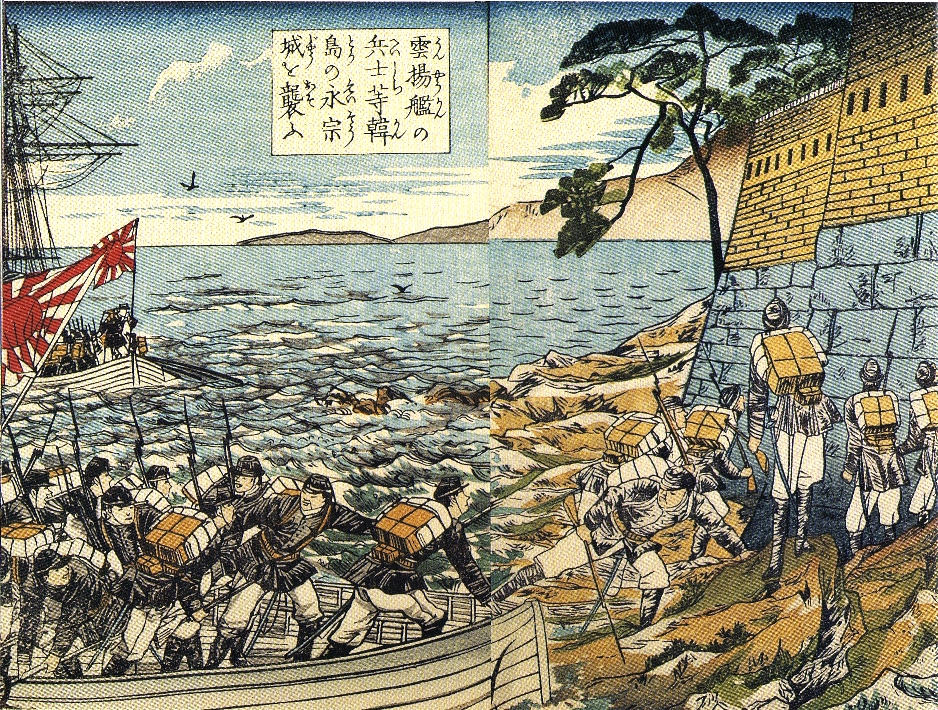
The landing of the Japanese marines from the Unyo at Ganghwa Island, Korea, during the 1875 Ganghwa Island incident

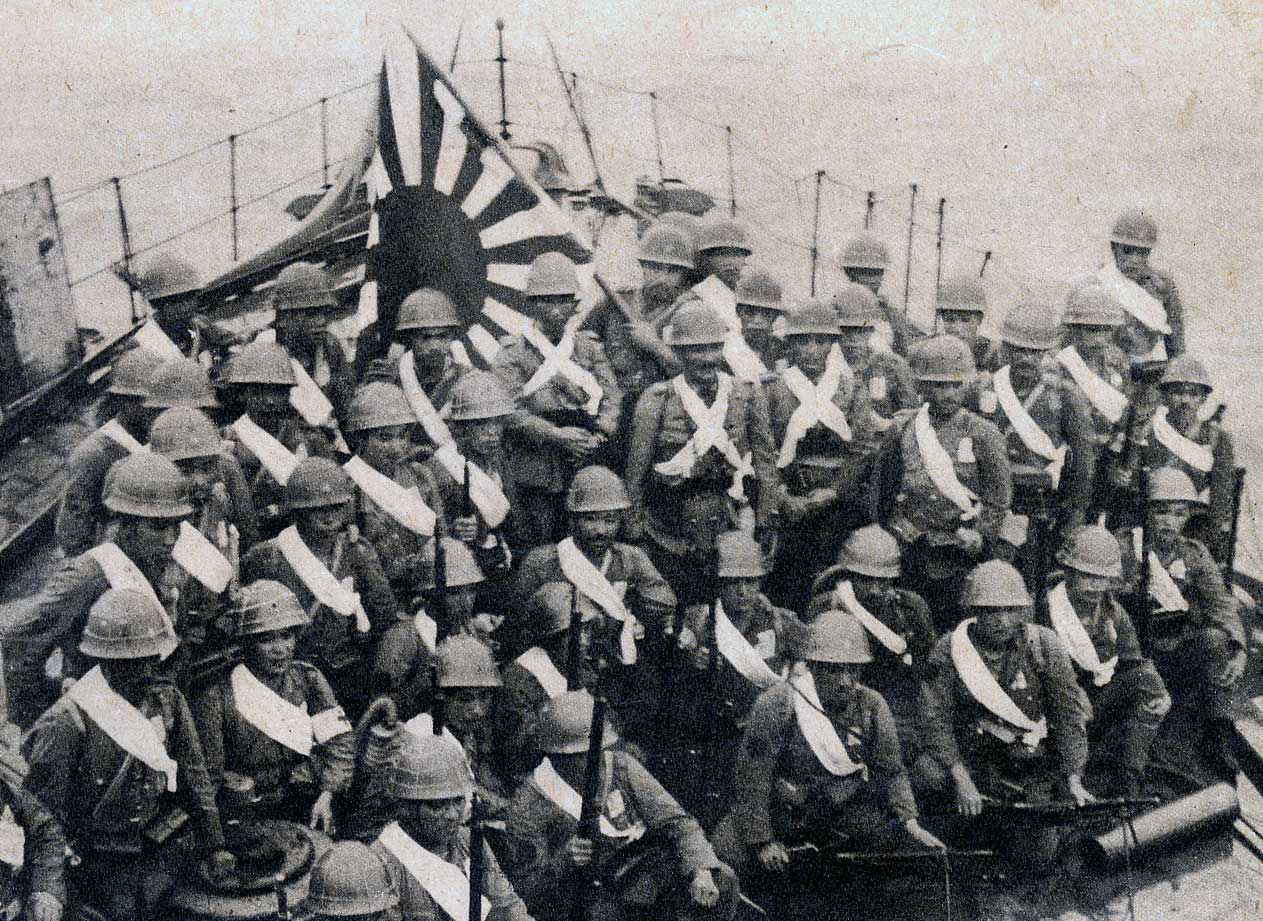
Japanese Special Naval Landing Forces

During the feudal period, the Japanese used Ashigaru soldiers or regular Yumi archers as soldiers to protect ships from pirates. In 1873, a short-lived marine corps was added to the newly created Imperial Japanese Navy (IJN), using Britain's Royal Marines as a model. Considered unsuitable in its original form, the force was disbanded in 1878. The IJN’s land forces maintained several combat units:

- Special Naval Landing Forces were the Empire of Japan's professional marine corps.
- Naval Landing Forces were ad-hoc formations of IJN naval personnel formed into naval infantry units for duties ashore.
- The IJN also maintained the Guard Forces (keibitai) and Defense Units (bobitai), both of whom also received amphibious assault and beach defence training. However, their performance was poor or average when they were used as assault troops.
- The Imperial Japanese Army's 3,500 man Sea-Landing Brigades (1st to 4th) were used to conduct amphibious assaults on an island, but afterwards they stayed to garrison that island.

=== Ottoman Empire ===
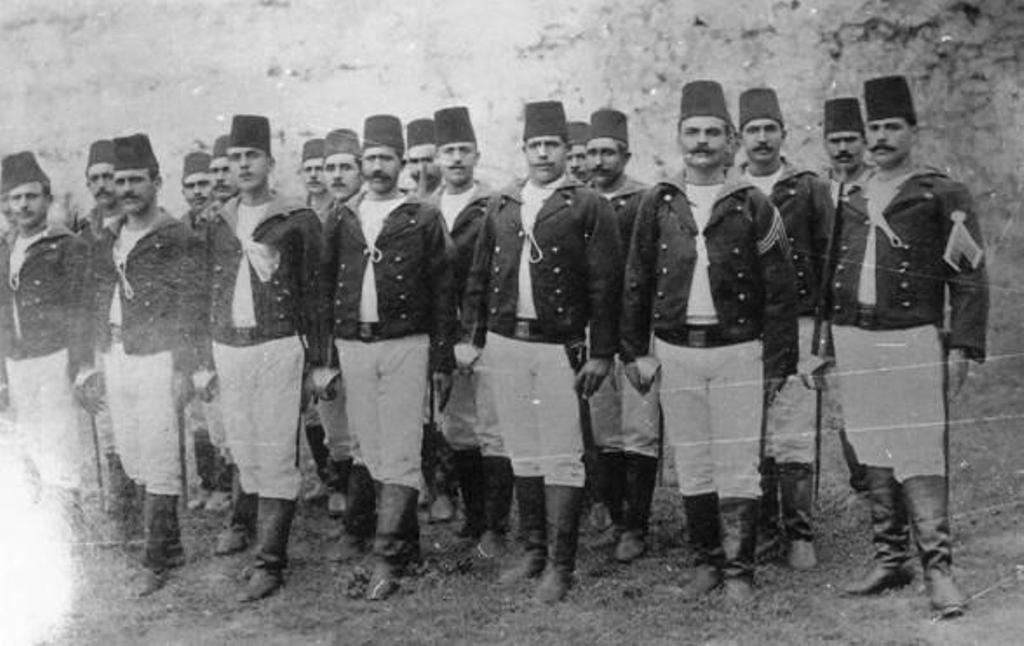
Ottoman naval infantrymen during the reign of Abdul Hamid II

The role of Ottoman naval infantry originated in Orhan's conquest of the Karasi Beylik and the capture of its fleet. From then on, Janissaries and Azaps were sometimes deployed as marines during the 14th Century. The Deniz azaps were used during the 16th Century; while troops called Levend (Bahriyeli) were raised on and off over the centuries – over 50,000 of them by the late 18th century. The last raised units were the Ta'ifat al Ru'sa (corsair captains militia) recruited from among the North African Arabs and indigenous Berbers. Ottoman marines were part of the Ottoman navy.

=== Portuguese Empire ===
Portugal raised numerous companies of Special Marines (Fuzileiros Especiais) and African Special Marines (Fuzileiros Especiais Africanos), both at home and in the African colonies of Portuguese Guinea, Portuguese Angola and Portuguese Mozambique, for service in Africa during the Portuguese Colonial Wars. The African Special Marines were all-black units.

=== Russian Empire ===
Following the establishment of the Imperial Russian Navy in 1696 under Peter the Great, as part of his naval force expansion, Naval Infantry of the Russian Empire (морской пехоты Российской Империи) was formed on November 16, 1705, by using several regiments of marine equipage troops that fought as much on land as they served in ship detachments. One battalion was formed within the Guard, and served on the Imperial family's ships. The Imperial Russia's Naval Infantry have seen action in the Great Northern War during the Battle of Gangut, took part in the capture of Izmail fortress in the Russo-Turkish Wars, distinguished itself by defeating the Napoleonic Army in the Battle of Borodino, Battle of Kulm, and the Siege of Danzig as well as taking part in the amphibious operations in Naples during the Napoleonic War. The Naval Infantry also saw action in the Siege of Sevastopol during the Crimean War, and took part in the defense of Port Arthur during Russo-Japanese War. Its final campaign in World War I saw them deployed to the Baltic Sea to defend against the German attacks as well as the Caspian Sea for operations against the Ottoman Empire. During the Russian Civil War the Imperial Russian Naval Infantry was fractured as the men were divided and ended up joining both sides of the conflict. Naval Infantrymen who joined either the Bolsheviks (such as the Baltic Fleet Naval Infantry) or joined the Whites distinguished themselves in battle for their respective sides. Following victory of the Bolsheviks, surrendering White Naval Infantrymen were either shot on the spot, or were tortured before being executed. Those who sided with the Bolsheviks were absorbed under the banner of the Soviet Navy and formed the backbone of the new Soviet Naval Infantry. Some of these Soviet Naval Infantrymen, particularly members of the Baltic Fleet Naval Infantry who aligned with the Bolsheviks during the civil war would later take part in the 1921 mutiny against the Soviet government on the Kronstadt island fortress shortly following its winding down.

=== Soviet Union ===
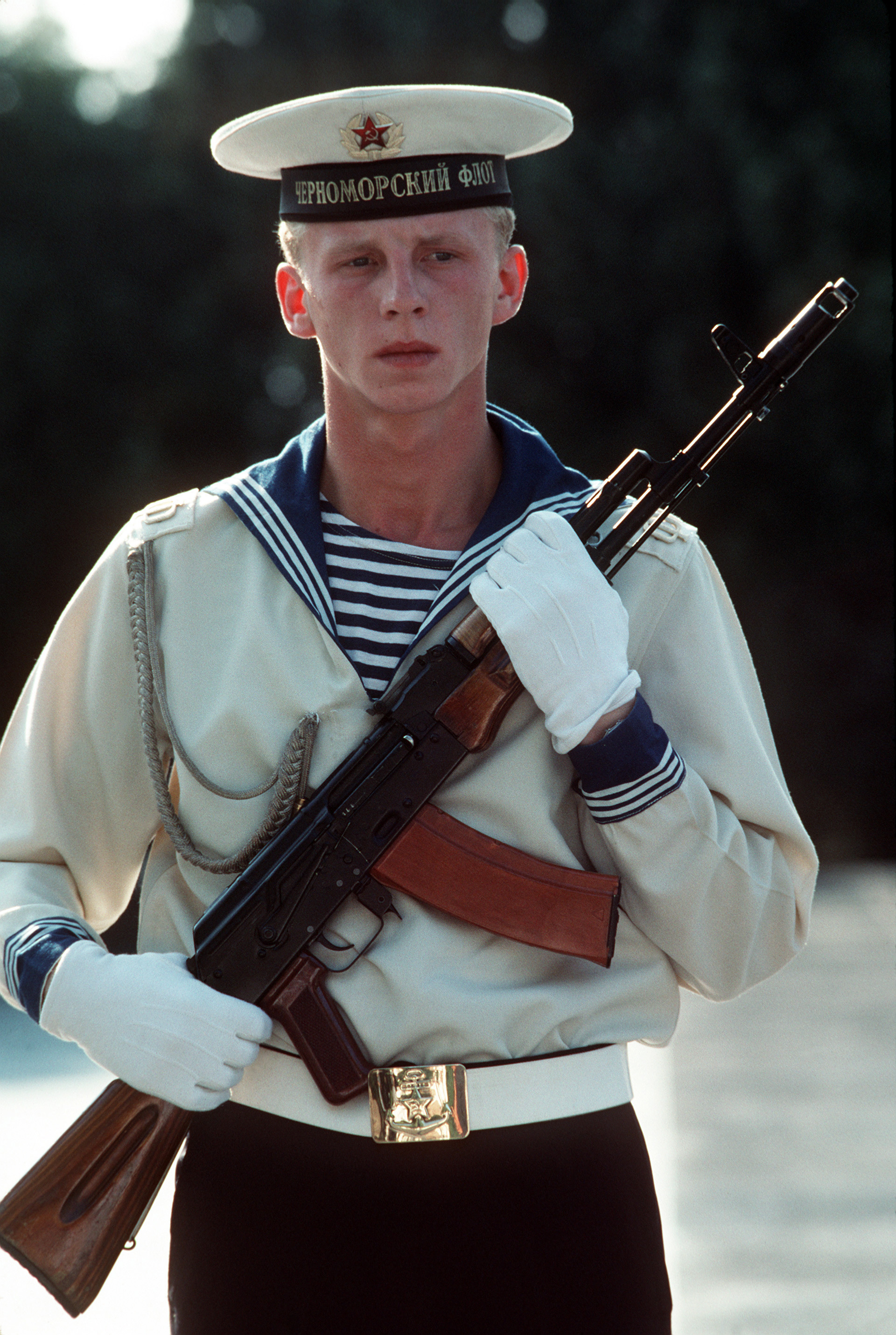
Soviet naval infantryman during a U.S. naval visit to a Soviet port in 1989

The Soviet Navy had a number of small battalion-sized naval infantry and coastal defence units that mostly served in the ports and bases before the Second World War. During the war, and building on the visuals of the mutinied sailors of Petrograd in 1917, the Stavka ordered formation of naval infantry brigades from surplus ship crew or shore duty sailors. Prior to World War II, members of the Soviet Naval Infantry took part in the 1921 mutiny against the Soviet government by the Baltic Fleet garrison on the Kronstadt island fort on the back end of the Russian Civil War. The mutiny was quickly put down by Soviet forces with retaliation against the rebels by the Soviet government resulting in their eventual execution.

=== South Africa ===
The South Africa Marine Corps was set up as a subbranch of the South African Navy in 1979, with the primary purpose of protecting harbours. The Marines were disbanded in 1989, following a major restructuring of the Navy at the end of the South African Border War.

=== Spain ===
The oldest naval infantry. Created 27 February 1537 as Tercio de Armada by Carlos I (Charles V, Holy Roman Emperor 1519–1556). Miguel de Cervantes, famous writer, was a member of naval infantry at Lepanto Battle. Squadron General and Captain Diego Fernández de Medrano stood out in the front line during the conquest of Terceira Island in 1583. Medrano's galleys allowed for marine infantry to be used for the first time in order to occupy beaches and land.

=== United Arab Emirates ===
In 2011, the UAE Marine Battalion was merged in the United Arab Emirates Presidential Guard.

=== United Kingdom ===
- The Royal Marines date from the establishment of a Maritime Regiment of Foot in 1664. The Marine Regiments for Sea were formed in 1702 but by 1713 they had been disbanded or taken into the army as regiments of foot. In 1755, a permanent corps of marine companies was established for direct service under the Admiralty, and this force has an unbroken descent to the Royal Marines of today.
- The Royal Navy has since its beginning formed naval landing parties of seamen for action ashore, this being later formalised into the Naval Brigades. These brigades would often dismount guns from their parent vessels for use ashore, these guns often being the only artillery available. The most famous example of this form of land service was provided by the guns accompanying the forces relieving Ladysmith.
- The Corps of Colonial Marines was raised from former American slaves as auxiliary units of the Royal Marines for service in the Americas: Two of these units were raised and subsequently disbanded. The first was a small unit which existed from 1808 to 12 October 1810, the second was more substantial and existed from May 1814 to 20 August 1816.
- The Royal Naval Division was part of the Royal Navy in the First World War. In 1914, the shortage of ground forces for the Western Front led to the creation of the Division, composed of two brigades of sailors and a brigade formed by the Royal Marines. The Division was part of the Royal Navy but for command purposes was integrated into the army's command structure. The sailors were initially disappointing as infantry, but eventually developed into one of the better divisions. The Division participated in the defence of the Belgian city of Antwerp in late 1914, and then served with heavy casualties at the Battle of Gallipoli. At different times the Division included various army units. The division ceased to exist after the end of the First World War.
- Gooch's Marines, the 61st Foot, raised in the American colonies for the War of Jenkins' Ear in 1739. This was a 3,000 man American regiment of the British Army that served alongside British Marines. Among its officers was Lawrence Washington, half-brother of George Washington. It was disbanded as a regiment in 1742 and the remaining independent companies were merged with another regiment in 1746.

=== United States ===
- American Colonial Marines were State Marines raised for the various state navies that came into existence shortly before the Revolutionary War.
- The Continental Marines were the marine force of the American Colonies during American Revolutionary War. The corps was formed by the Continental Congress on November 10, 1775, and was disbanded in 1783. The Continental Marines' first and only Commandant was Captain Samuel Nicholas.
- Hillet Marine River Regiment of the Union Army during the American Civil War, this regiment consisted of 10 rifle companies, a Cavalry Battalion of 5 companies, and an artillery battalion of three batteries, all of whom operated from Mississippi River gunboats as part of the Mississippi River Squadron.
- The Republic of Texas Marine Corps – Although a marine corps was suggested in the "Act and Decree Establishing a Navy," passed on November 25, 1835, it was not until acting governor James W. Robinson strongly urged the swift formation of such an organization in his message to the General Council on January 14, 1836, that steps were actually taken to commission officers of marines and recruit enlisted personnel. Before the end of the Republic of Texas and annexation to the United States, more than 350 men served with the Texas Marine Corps, and at least eighteen officers were commissioned to command them. The Texas Marine Corps served under the direction of the Navy Department of the Republic, and the duties of the corps were specifically ordained in fifteen articles passed by the Texas Congress on December 13, 1836. Marines served under their own officers aboard ship and ashore but were subject to the orders of the senior naval officer present. The uniform of the Texas Marine came from discontinued USMC stocks, changing only the buttons and cap devices to those of Texas configuration.
- The Confederate Marines were a branch of the Confederate States Navy and was established by the Confederate Congress on 16 March 1861; they were mainly (80%) defectors from the US Marines.

=== Nguyễn clan of southern Đại Việt ===
The Nguyễn lords (ancestors of the Nguyễn dynasty) of southern Đại Việt maintained a small naval infantry or marine force. Each marine was referred to as a thủy binh (水兵) or water soldier.

=== South Vietnam ===
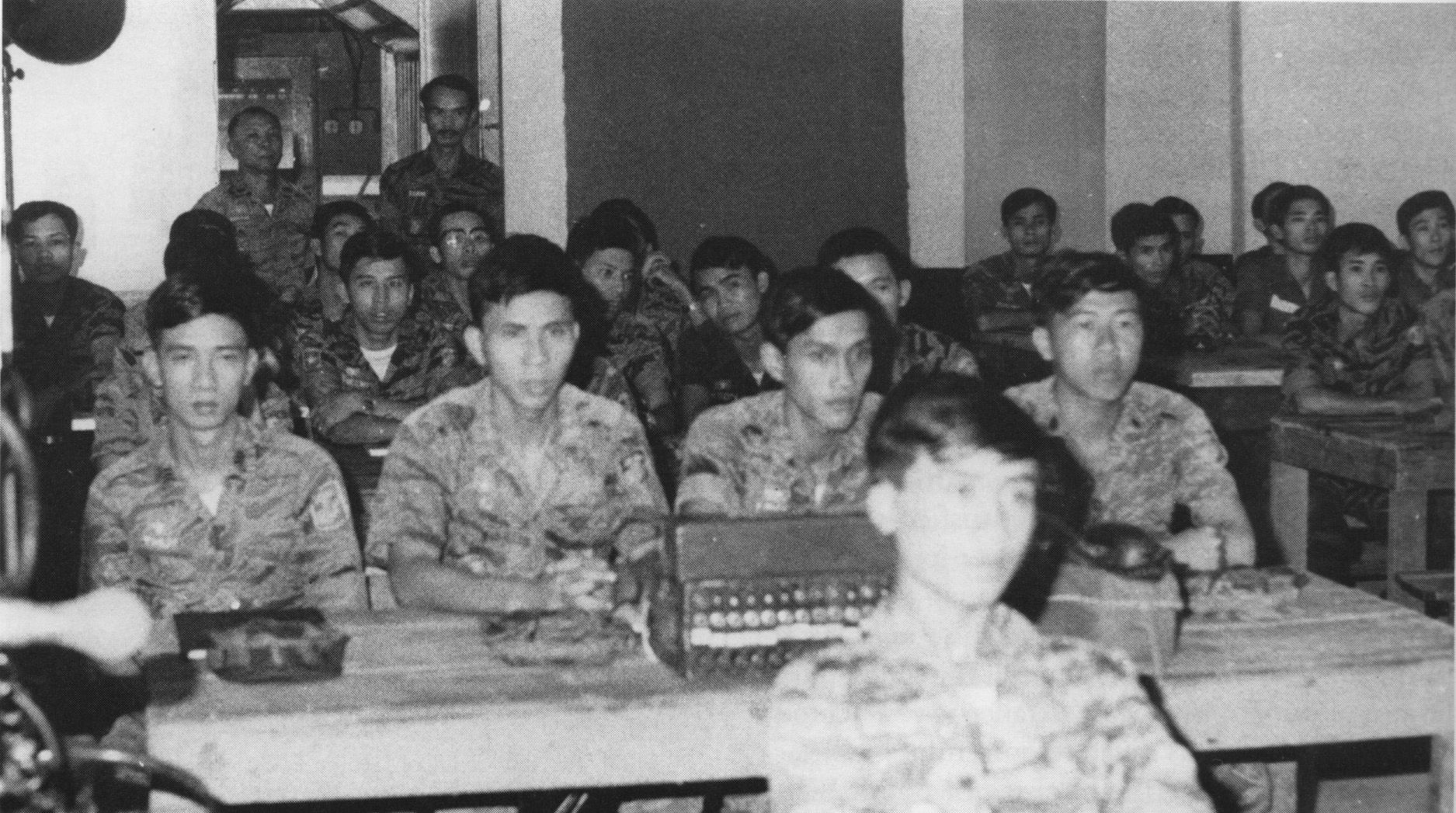
South Vietnamese marines during training

Vietnamese dynasties had a long tradition of utilizing marines. This tradition went back no later than the Annam Protectorate of Tang dynasty when the governors built boats and trained marines to fight off pirates and invaders. The successive Vietnamese dynasties made full use of their marines' superiority at river and sea to launch successful campaigns against their northward and southward neighbors alike.

The forerunner of the Republic of Vietnam Marine Corps (VNMC) aka by their native name; Sư Đoàn Thủy Quân Lục Chiến (TQLC; Chữ Hán: 師團水軍陸戰) was established by Ngo Dinh Diem, then prime minister of what was then the State of Vietnam on October 13, 1954. It draws its roots from the colonial-era Corps des Marines vietnamien under the french’s Commandos Marine with much of their original members being Vietnamese who were trained by the Commandos Marine. Their establishment dates back to their formation as a naval infantry unit of the Republic of Vietnam Navy under the Vietnamese National Army, which after French decolonization, would become the Republic of Vietnam Military Forces. The TQLC was disbanded as a result of the fall of Saigon on 1 May 1975 marking the conclusion of the Vietnam War.

=== Yugoslavia (SFRY) ===
The 12th Naval Infantry Brigade (12. brigada mornaričko desantne pješadije) of the Yugoslavian Navy of the Socialist Federal Republic of Yugoslavia consisted of 900 to 2,000 men in three battalions. A multi-ethnic unit, the brigade was broken up during the dissolution of the Yugoslav federation and saw little action.

== See also ==
- List of marines and naval infantry forces
- Combat diver
- Air force infantry
- Navy
