= Cambodian Marine Corps =

Cambodian Marine Corps Corps de Fusiliers-Marins Khmères
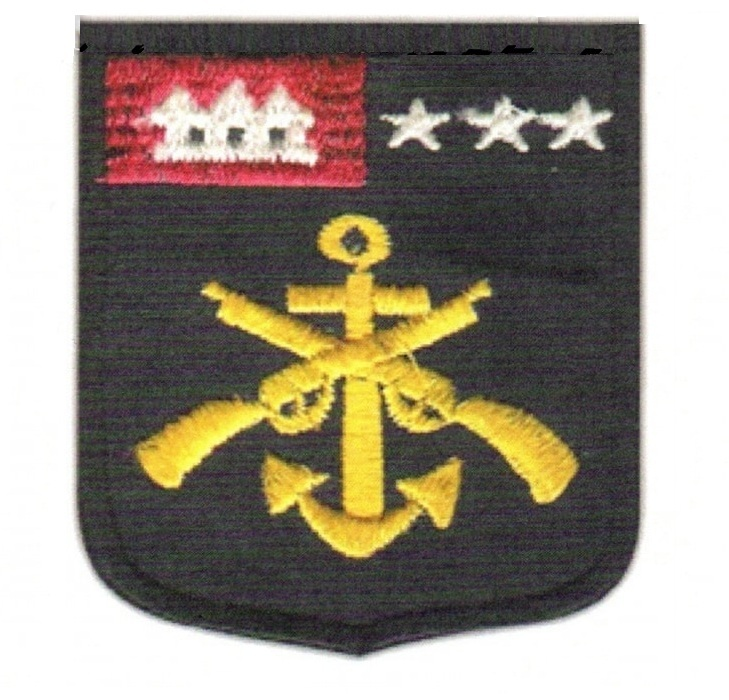
- Cambodian Marine Corps shoulder patch (1970-1975)
- Active: 1960 – 17 April 1975
- Country: First Kingdom of Cambodia; Cambodia
- Allegiance: 1st Kingdom of Cambodia (1960–1970); Khmer Republic (1970–1975)
- Branch: Royal Khmer Navy (1960–1970); Khmer National Navy (1970–1975)
- Type: Marines
- Role: Amphibious warfare
- Size: 6,500 men (at height in 1974)
- Part of: Royal Khmer Armed Forces (1960–1970); Khmer National Armed Forces (1970–1975)
- Headquarters: Chrui Chhangwar Naval Base, Phnom Penh
- Nickname: CFMK (CMC in English)
- Engagements: Siege of Kompong Seila; Battle of Kompong Cham; Battle of Oudong; Battle of Kampot; Fall of Phnom Penh

Commanders
- Notable commanders: Uom Chum; Kim Yen; Vong Sarendy

The Cambodian Marine Corps or Corps de Fusiliers-Marins Khmères (CFMK) in French, were the naval infantry branch of the Khmer National Navy (French: Marine National Khmère – MNK) during the 1970-75 Cambodian Civil War.

== History ==
The origins of the Cambodian Marines can be traced back to December 1955, when the Royal Khmer Navy (French: Marine Royale Khmère – MRK) Fleet Command began drawing plans to raise a Naval Infantry Group (French: Groupement d'Infanterie de Marine – GIM) consisting of two marine commando companies totalling 200 men, envisaged to be used on amphibious operations. The GIM never surpassed the planning stage however, though a MRK officer, Lieutenant (French: Lieutenant de vaisseau) Uon Chum was later sent to French-ruled Algeria in November 1958 to attend the 'Commando' course at the French marine commandos' Centre Siroco School (French: École des Fusiliers-Marins) in Cape Matifou near Algiers.

The MRK naval infantry branch was officially established in 1960 but initial progress was slow – it was not until 1965 that a single marine rifle company (French: Compagnie de Fusiliers-Marins or CFM for short) was raised with a strength of just 150 Marines trained and led by Lt. Chum, subsequently enlarged to 200 men by 1969. They were never used in their intended amphibious role, being assigned primarily with guarding the MRK headquarters and main naval facilities at the Chrui Chhangwar Peninsula (11.583°N 104.916°E) close to Phnom Penh. Late that same year, the 200-strong CFM was amalgamated with 1,014 ex-Royal Khmer Army troops recently transferred to the MRK to form the nucleus of two new marine rifle battalions (French: Bataillons de Fusiliers-Marins – BFM). Raised for static defence and designated respectively 1st BFM and 2nd BFM, each battalion had an authorized strength of 607 men. Two further battalions – 3rd BFM and 4th BFM – were in the process of being formed by the time of the change of government in March 1970.

=== The Marines in the Cambodian Civil War ===
With the outbreak of the Civil War in April 1970, plans were drawn by the rechristened Khmer National Navy (MNK) Fleet Command to rapidly expand the CFMK to ten battalions in October, but only four BFMs totalling 3,000 men were fully operational by the end of the year. During the first three years of the war the Marines remained a small static defence force – by March 1972 the MNK Marine Corps' strength had decreased to 2,400 men after the disbandment of 2nd BFM, which reduced the number of its battalions from four to three. They were still tasked with protecting the MNK main riverine base at Chrui Chhangwar and the coastal naval base at Ream in Kampot Province. During this period, at least one BFM comprising 493 men was sent in October 1972 to South Vietnam to be trained by US Marine advisors under the US Army-Vietnam Individual Training Program (UITG); as for the remaining BFMs however, their training took place in Cambodia, at the Chrui Chhangwar naval base.

==== Expansion 1973–1974 ====
This situation lasted until early 1973, when the MNK was once again authorized to double the strength of its Marine Corps, including an ambitious expansion to thirty battalions though the actual number of BFMs never came close. In May of that year, 2nd BFM was re-activated at Kaam Sam Naar near the south Vietnamese border, followed by the creation of four new battalions at Chrui Chhangwar – 5th, 6th, 7th, and 8th BFMs – after a concerted recruiting effort and by the transfer of 3,000 soldiers from recently disbanded Cambodian Army (ANK) territorial companies to the MNK; two additional battalions – 9th BFM and 10th BFM – began to be formed in October. Initially intended solely for static defence, the BFMs deployment now paralleled the ANK, with the Marines being used more aggressively as intervention forces on offensive operations in conjunction with MNK riverine forces. By August 1974, all marine battalions were required to keep at least one of its rifle companies totally outfitted and ready to be deployed as a quick mobile intervention force (French: Force d'Intervention Mobile – FIM) for emergencies at all times. The BFMs fought as an interdiction force along most of the country's major waterways by spearheading amphibious assaults to secure beachheads and conducting clearing operations on islands located in the lower Mekong occupied by the Khmer Rouge; they also patrolled the coastline and continued to provide harbour security to both military and civilian sea and river ports. In addition, the Marines provided cadre personnel for the new Cambodian SEAL Commando unit raised by the MNK Fleet Command in September 1973.

By December 1973 the MNK Marine Corps aligned eight fully operational battalions: 1st BFM and 3rd BFM were at Ream and 4th BFM was allocated at Chrui Chhangwar, whilst the other four – 2nd, 6th, 7th, and 8th BFMs – were deployed in the Mekong Special Zone (French: Zone Spéciale du Mekong – ZSM; later re-designated 12th Tactical Zone or Zone Tactique 12), a MNK tactical area and special military zone that run along the lower Mekong-Bassac River corridors; meanwhile, 5th BFM was still undergoing training at Chrui Chhangwar. That same month, 9th BFM was brought to strength at Kampong Chhnang and assigned patrol duties along the upper Tonle Sap River, engaging in counter-insurgency operations coordinated with the Cambodian Army's Lake Brigade in the namesake adjoining lake, though 10th BFM had yet to be filled by the year's end. Employed extensively in the offensive role for nearly a year and a half, by September 1974 the Cambodian Marines were starting to show signs of heavy strain. Casualties and manpower shortages seriously affected their tactical deployment, resulting in poor discipline and low morale. Due to budgetary restraints, the Marines received insufficient rice rations and were denied hazardous duty pay (French: Prime d'intervention) comparable to that paid by the ANK. This led to frequent desertions from the ranks of the BFMs and forced some of its members to leave their posts to moonlight on second jobs. Although the attribution of combat bonuses and the distribution of free rice did much to restore morale in the BFMs on several occasions, it did not completely stop the desertions, and the problem was never rectified.

==== Final operations ====
During the last three months of the War, the MNK Marine Corps reached a strength of 6,500 men on twelve battalions, and aggressiveness and greatly increased mobility characterized their operations. The MNK riverine forces and the Marines conducted on January 18, 1975, Operation "Sailor", a last-minute effort to clear Khmer Rouge forces from a few strategic islands in the Mekong located close to Phnom Penh. It was to be the final amphibious operation of the Cambodian Marine Corps – despite their best efforts, the weakened BFMs posted in the Mekong Special Zone bore the brunt of the Khmer Rouge offensive and resistance crumbled, with desertions reportedly becoming rampant. By February 17, the MNK Fleet Command abandoned any attempts to re-open the lower Mekong and Bassac corridors, and with the loss of Neak Leung on April 1, the strangulation of the Cambodian Capital was completed. The remaining Marine battalions were pulled back to Phnom Penh to help defending the city and the respective MNK riverine base at Chrui Chhangwar, while others withdrew to the Ream Naval Base.

Only a few Marines and their civilian dependents managed to escape on April 17 from Ream with the vessels of the MNK Sea Patrol Force that reached Subic Bay in the Philippines on May 9; their comrades at the Chrui Chhangwar riverine base who surrendered to the Khmer Rouge were not so fortunate. They were reportedly rounded up and either shot by firing squad, their bodies dumped into shallow graves dug in forest areas or were sent to be 're-educated' in labour camps (known as the "Killing Fields"), remaining there until the Cambodian–Vietnamese War of 1978–79.

== Structure and organization ==
The basic unit of the Cambodian Marine Corps was the battalion or BFM comprising 577 to 607 men, theoretically organized according to the French Army model into a battalion headquarters (HQ), three company HQs and three rifle companies. In reality however, the BFMs suffered from extremely weak leadership, were poorly trained and rarely matched this proposed organization, with most battalions actually falling below strength – some units fielded three incomplete rifle companies (with an average strength of 507 to 418 men), while others had two full-strength companies (365 to 312 men) or consisted of a single, understrength company that could field just 118 men.

There were no major, long-standing formations above battalion level. Unlike the United States Marine Corps (USMC) and South Vietnamese Marine Corps (VNMC), the Cambodian Marines were never consolidated into Regiments, Half-Brigades (French: Demi-Brigades) and Brigades or even a single Marine Division. The BFMs were autonomous light infantry units that often operated independently from each other, though two or more companies from different battalions could be assembled to form temporary combat task-forces in amphibious assault operations, such as during the battles of Kampong Cham and Oudong. The Cambodian Marine Corps had no organic armour, artillery, motor transport, medical or engineer support units, so Marine battalions were completely reliant on the MNK, the Cambodian Army and the Khmer Air Force (KAF) for river and road transport, casualty evacuation and air, armoured and artillery support.

In deep contrast to their VNMC counterparts who, although a component of the South Vietnamese Navy (VNN) belonged operationally to the Joint General Staff (JGS) of the Republic of Vietnam Military Forces as part of their General Reserve, the CFMK was not placed under the Khmer National Armed Forces (FANK) own JGS (French: État-Major Générale – EMG). Instead, it answered directly to the MNK Chief of Naval Operations, Commodore (later, Rear Admiral) Vong Sarendy, who acted as the de facto Marine Corps' Commander throughout the War.

=== Units ===
- 1st Marine Battalion (1 BFM)
- 2nd Marine Battalion (2 BFM)
- 3rd Marine Battalion (3 BFM)
- 4th Marine Battalion (4 BFM)
- 5th Marine Battalion (5 BFM)
- 6th Marine Battalion (6 BFM)
- 7th Marine Battalion (7 BFM)
- 8th Marine Battalion (8 BFM)
- 9th Marine Battalion (9 BFM)
- 10th Marine Battalion (10 BFM)
- 11th Marine Battalion (11 BFM)
- 12th Marine Battalion (12 BFM)

== Weapons and equipment ==
In the early years of their existence, the Cambodian Marines were equipped by the French Army with a mix of French and US small-arms and equipment of World War II-vintage, mostly drawn from stocks of the First Indochina War or provided directly by American assistance programs until 1964. After 1970, the BFMs employed the same standard weaponry and equipment of US origin issued to Cambodian Army infantry formations, though it remains unclear if they ever used captured Soviet or Chinese small-arms.

- Belgium FN GP35 Pistols
- United States Colt.45 M1911 Pistols
- United States Smith & Wesson Model 39 Revolvers
- United States M16A1 Assault rifle
- United States M1918A2 BAR Light machine gun
- United States Browning M1919A4/Mk 21 Medium machine gun
- United States Browning M2HB .50 Cal Heavy machine gun
- United States M79 grenade launcher
- United States M72 LAW Anti-tank rocket launcher
- United States M19 Mortar 60 mm
- United States M29 Mortar 81 mm

== See also ==
- Battle of Kampot
- Battle of Kampong Cham
- Battle of Oudong
- Cambodian Civil War
- Cambodian Navy SEALs
- Commandos Marine
- Khmer National Armed Forces
- Lake Brigade (Cambodia)
- List of weapons of the Cambodian Civil War
- Republic of Korea Marine Corps
- Republic of Vietnam Marine Corps
- Troupes de marine
- United States Marine Corps
