= Cambodian Navy SEALs =

- Active: September 1973 – 17 April 1975
- Country: Cambodia
- Allegiance: Khmer Republic
- Branch: Khmer National Navy
- Type: Special forces
- Size: 90 men (at height in 1974)
- Part of: Khmer National Armed Forces (FANK)
- Headquarters: Chrui Chhangwar Naval Base, Phnom Penh
- Nickname: CNS
- Engagements: Battle of Kampong Cham; Battle of Kampot; Battle of Oudong; Fall of Phnom Penh

Commanders
- Notable commanders: Set Chan

The Cambodian Navy SEALs were the main elite Maritime Special Operations Force of the Khmer National Navy (French: Marine National Khmère – MNK) during the 1970-75 Cambodian Civil War.

== Origins ==
In September 1973, with the encouragement of the U.S. Naval attaché in Phnom Penh, Lieutenant commander Richard Marcinko, the MNK Fleet Command decided to raise its own special warfare unit, the Cambodian SEALs. An initial group of 24 recruits was drawn from an existing Combat Swimmer Unit (French: Nageurs de Combat) and from the Cambodian Marine Corps, being sent to the Naval Amphibious Base Coronado at San Diego, California in the United States and to Subic Bay Naval Base in the Philippines to attend basic courses taught by U.S. Navy SEAL instructors from the Amphibious Group 1, the forward-based operational arm of the U.S. Naval Special Warfare Force in the Pacific. At Coronado and Subic Bay, the Cambodian inductees underwent five weeks of basic Underwater Demolitions/SEAL training, which included Commando operations, reconnaissance and intelligence-gathering, jungle warfare, light weapons and demolitions; upon returning to Cambodia after completing their instruction cycle, they went to form the core of the new unit and provided the training cadre for a SEAL course, which was established at Chrui Chhangwar Naval Base.

Initial progress was rapid and by the first quarter of 1974, the Cambodian SEALs aligned 40 men in three 'Commando' teams, mostly filled by selected volunteers transferred from the Cambodian Marine Corps and trained in-country, although another group of 23 Navy and Marine inductees was later sent to Subic Bay to receive ten weeks of SEAL training during the second half of that year. Parachute courses were conducted at the FANK Airborne Training Centre co-located at the Pochentong dual military/civilian international airport, while the Olympic pool located near the National Stadium at the Cércle Sportive complex in Phnom Penh was used for diving courses.

== Structure and organization ==
Headquartered at the Chrui Chhangwar Naval Base opposite Phnom Penh and closely modelled after the U.S. Navy SEALs, the unit fielded by mid-1974 a total of 90 'Commandos' divided according to the SEALs practice into three teams led by Chief Petty Officer (French: Premier Maître) Set Chan, who reported directly for operational orders to the MNK Chief of Naval Operations, Commodore (later, Rear Admiral) Vong Sarendy. They were structured as follows:

- SEAL Team 1 was allocated in Phnom Penh, where it served both as Headquarters (HQ) for the MNK Amphibious Operations Command (French: Commandement des opérations amphibies) and training cadre for the basic SEAL course. It was also tasked of monitoring the security of naval facilities in the Cambodian capital and carried out counter-insurgency operations along the lower Mekong-Bassac Rivers corridors.
- SEAL Team 2, also stationed at Phnom Penh, was frequently deployed on the lower Mekong.
- SEAL Team 3, based at the Ream Naval Base, was given responsibility for operations around the port city of Kompong Som and along the Cambodian coastline.

== Operations 1973–1975 ==
The Cambodian SEALs provided valuable intelligence for the MNK while acting as reconnaissance teams along the banks of the Mekong and as shock troops on amphibious assault operations.

During the Battle of Kampong Cham in September 1973 the newly-constituted Cambodian SEALs spearheaded Operation "Castor 21", a successful combined amphibious assault by the Marines and the Cambodian Army's 80th Infantry Brigade, launched by the MNK Fleet Command to retake the Khmer Rouge-held half of the provincial capital of Kampong Cham. The Cambodian SEALs resumed the same role again in March 1974, during the MNK's second large-scale amphibious assault, Operation "Castor 50", to retake Oudong, the capital of Oudong Meanchey Province from the Khmer Rouge.

They defended the Chrui Chhangwar Naval Base until the final days of the war.

== See also ==
- Khmer Special Forces
- United States Navy SEALs
- Vong Sarendy
