= Battle of Kâmpóng Cham =

1973 battle of the Cambodian Civil War

- Part of Cambodian Civil War, Vietnam War
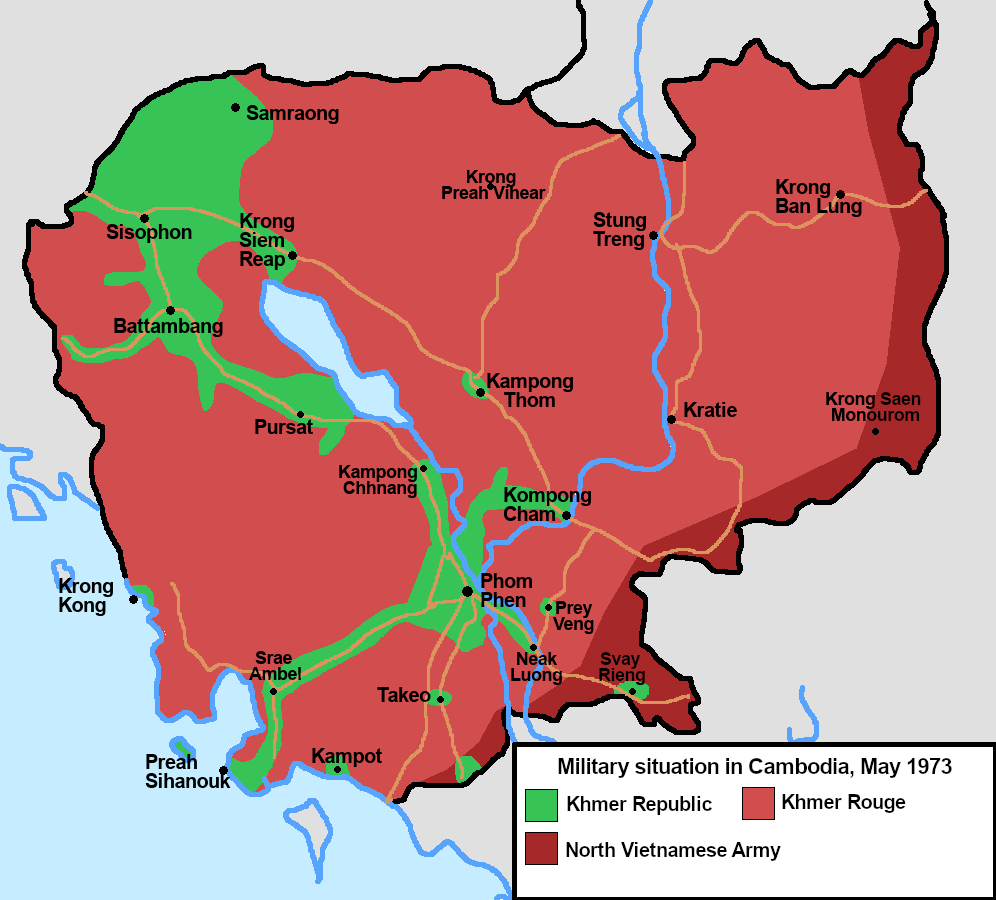
- Map showing the areas under Communist control.
Date	16 August – 4 October 1973
Location	Kâmpóng Cham, Cambodia
Result	Khmer Republic victory

Belligerents
Khmer Republic	(Cambodia) Khmer Rouge; North Vietnam

Commanders and leaders
(Khmer Republic) Major General Sar Hor	

Units involved
Khmer National Army: 5th Brigade; 70th Brigade; 80th Brigade; Khmer National Navy; Khmer Air Force	(Cambodia) Northern Zone (Cambodia) Eastern Zone

Strength
6,000	5,000

Casualties and losses
400 killed (by 14 September)	2,000 killed and wounded (by 14 September)
- 600 civilians killed (by 14 September)

The Battle of Kâmpóng Cham was a military engagement from August to October 1973 for control of the Cambodian city of Kâmpóng Cham between Khmer Republic defenders and Khmer Rouge attackers.

== Battle ==
By 16 August 1973 the enemy was able to direct all his efforts to capturing the first provincial capital of the war, Kompong Cham; a series of shelling attacks, followed by strong ground attacks caused the FANK defense line around Kompong Cham to be steadily threatened along with the loss of full use of the airfield.

FANK reinforced initially with the 79th Brigade, two battalions of the Parachute Brigade, two battalions of the 5th Brigade, and an additional battery of four 10S-mm howitzers. Efforts to restore or expand the perimeter were unsuccessful. The enemy's main effort to take the city came on 1 September with heavy mortar and 10S-mm fire, and multiple ground attacks which penetrated the FANK defensive line to within 1 km of the city. FANK forces were able to stop the enemy's momentum and stabilize the situation on 2 September. The two remaining battalions of the 5th Brigade and the Parachute Brigade, two Special Forces Detachments, and 12 Navy craft were designated as additional reinforcements for Kompong Cham. Major General Sar Hor, the commander, was given authority to give up the airfield in order to defend the city proper. The situation continued to deteriorate despite the arrival of the remainder of the 5th Brigade.

On 6 September communist forces attacking from the west and south overran the city athletic field capturing six 105‐mm howitzers. A small unit of communist troops moved into the city's marketplace broadcasting from loudspeakers orders for civilians to move south. Military hospital was also overrun with most of the 300 patients being evacuated but 20 women being left behind. Government forces suffered 50 killed and 200 wounded, 300 civilians were killed or wounded in cross-fire. Around 10 patients were eventually killed at the hospital with grenades and the hospital was damaged by shellfire and its operation theater was destroyed.

=== Counteroffensive ===
On 7 September, following the exfiltration of two Parachute Battalions from the airfield to the city, and the arrival of a 16-ship naval task force, FANK contained the enemy's advance and slowly began to push him back from within the city. The city's hospital and much of the Central Market were recaptured by the government forces. The airfield was held by the troops but not operational due to communist shelling. Aerial resupplies and evacuations were carried out from the nearby town of Tonle Bet.

The 80th Brigade arrived by navy convoy on 10 September and was immediately inserted south of the city behind the enemy. On 12 September government captured the Wat Dei Doh pagoda allowing them to link up with the forces from the south and clearing most of the city from enemy. However shelling continued, albeit reduced. On 18 September the Kompong Cham university was recaptured. Government forces also repelled two attacks on the airfield where 1,000 paratroopers were entrenched. United States delivered two 200-bed disaster relief hospitals to help with the wounded.

On 22 September government forces recaptured the Boeung Kok pagoda after 17 hours of fighting where they found bodies of 30 insurgent troops including North Vietnamese troops. On 2 October Khmer Republic forces recaptured the textile factory west of the town, reportedly killing 10 insurgents while losing three soldiers. And finally on 4 October the siege of the airport was broken.
