= Khmer National Navy =

Navy of the Khmer Republic (1970-1975)

- កងទ័ពជើងទឹកជាតិខ្មែរ (Khmer); Marine nationale khmère (French)
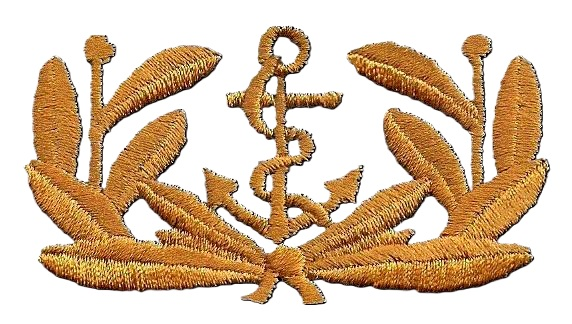
- Khmer National Navy officer and petty officer's cap badge
- Founded: 1 March 1954; 72 years ago as the Royal Khmer Navy; 9 October 1970; 56 years ago as the Khmer National Navy
- Country: First Kingdom of Cambodia; Khmer Republic (Cambodia)
- Allegiance: 1st Kingdom of Cambodia (1954-1970); Khmer Republic (1970-1975)
- Type: Navy
- Role: Naval warfare Brown-water navy Amphibious warfare
- Size: 16,500 men, 178 ships, boats and other vessels (at height in 1974)
- Part of: Royal Khmer Armed Forces (1954–1970); Khmer National Armed Forces (1970–1975)
- Garrison/HQ: Chrui Changwar Naval Base (Main base); Norodom Boulevard, Phnom Penh (Headquarters)
- Nickname: MNK
- Colours: Navy blue, red
- Anniversaries: 1 March – MRK Day; 9 October – MNK Day
- Engagements: Cambodian Civil War; Vietnam War

Commanders
- Notable commanders: Vong Sarendy

Insignia
- MNK Naval ensign (1970–1975)

The Khmer National Navy (Khmer: កងទ័ពជើងទឹកជាតិខ្មែរ; French: Marine nationale khmère, MNK) was the naval component of the Khmer National Armed Forces (FANK), the official military of the Khmer Republic during the Cambodian Civil War between 1970 and 1975.

== History ==
The Royal Khmer Navy (French: Marine royale khmère, MRK) was officially established on 1 March 1954, to provide limited patrolling of Cambodia's maritime coastline and territorial waters, monitoring the security of its main deep-water ports and major waterways. The MRK was formed with an initial strength of just 600 officers and enlisted men placed under the authority of Captain (French: Capitaine de vaisseau) Pierre Coedes, a naval officer of mixed French-Cambodian origin, who acted as Chief of Naval Operations (French: Chef des Opérations Navales). They crewed a handful of World War II-vintage ex-French Navy vessels transferred to Cambodia at the end of the First Indochina War: British-made Harbour Defence Motor Launches (French: Vedettes d'port), U.S.-made Landing Craft Vehicle Personnel (LCVP) and LCM (6) Landing Crafts. Most of the MRK's naval assets and personnel, together with its administrative headquarters, were harboured at the former French colonial riverine station situated in the Chrui Chhangwar Peninsula (11.583°N 104.916°E) across the Tonle Sap river from Phnom Penh. However, the tiny facilities proved so inadequate that the Navy HQ was allocated aboard an old French-made riverine vessel named La Payotte, permanently moored at Chrui Chhangwar base.

=== Early expansion phase 1955–1964 ===
Closely modelled after the Naval and riverine component of the French Far East Expeditionary Corps (CEFEO), the MRK received training, technical and material assistance primarily from France and the United States. At first, the Cambodian naval service continued to expand rapidly under French auspices between 1955 and 1957 – at this stage, a French Military Mission in Cambodia helped in the renovation or construction of new harbour facilities, provided technical assistance and training programs, and supervised equipment deliveries. The MRK also began to receive additional assistance from the United States Military Assistance Advisory Group (U.S. MAAG) aid program, established since June 1955 at Phnom Penh.

The cramped Chrui Chhangwar base was modernized and enlarged to accommodate a new dock designed for large-sized riverine vessels and a Naval Training School (French: École Navale), established in January 1955 to train ship crews and other specialized personnel. The MRK had no naval academy at the time, so Khmer officer candidate students (French: Eléves Officiers de Marine – EOM) were sent to France, in order to attend advanced Officer courses at the French Naval Academy in Brest.

A new coastal naval base was constructed at Ream in Kampot Province, near the newly built port city of Sihanoukville (rechristened Kampong Som in 1970), equipped with a floating dock whilst the Cambodian Navy's tiny surface fleet was augmented at the time by the addition of fifteen sea and river crafts of British and U.S. origin donated by the French government. Under the U.S. MAAG aid program, the Cambodian Navy received three LSSLs, four Landing Craft Utility (LCU/YFU), two 63-foot Combat Salvage Boats (CSB) armed with M2 Browning 12.7 mm Heavy Machine Guns, five LCM (8) LCUs, and more LCM (6) landing crafts.

=== The neutrality years 1964–1970 ===
By November 1963, MRK strength had grown to 1,200 Ratings and seamen under the command of the Chief of Naval Operations Captain Pierre Coedes until August 1969, when he was replaced by then Lieutenant commander (French: Capitaine de corvette) Vong Sarendy. However, its steady expansion came to a halt on 20 November 1963, when Prince Norodom Sihanouk cancelled all American aid in response to the coup against President Ngô Đình Diệm in South Vietnam and on 15 January 1964 the U.S. MAAG aid program was suspended when Cambodia adopted a neutrality policy. Deprived of further American support, the MRK continued to rely on the French military mission to provide both vital basic and technical training for its own naval personnel, receiving thereafter some aid from China and Yugoslavia. Between 1965 and 1969, these latter countries delivered three Yulin-class gunboats and two TC-101 torpedo boats (the latter soon rendered unserviceable due to accidents and natural disasters), whilst France provided an EDIC III-class Landing craft tank (LCT) for coastal transport duties.

As with the other branches of the then FARK, the Cambodian Navy's own military capabilities in the late 1960s remained low and the missions that they performed mirrored those of a peacetime River Police force or Coast Guard rather than a true Navy. Therefore, MRK activities were restricted to inland patrols on the Bassac River, the Mekong, and the Tonle Sap River in the vicinity of the namesake Great Lake whilst high seas operations were limited to routine inshore patrolling in the Gulf of Thailand.

=== Pre-1970 fleet organization ===
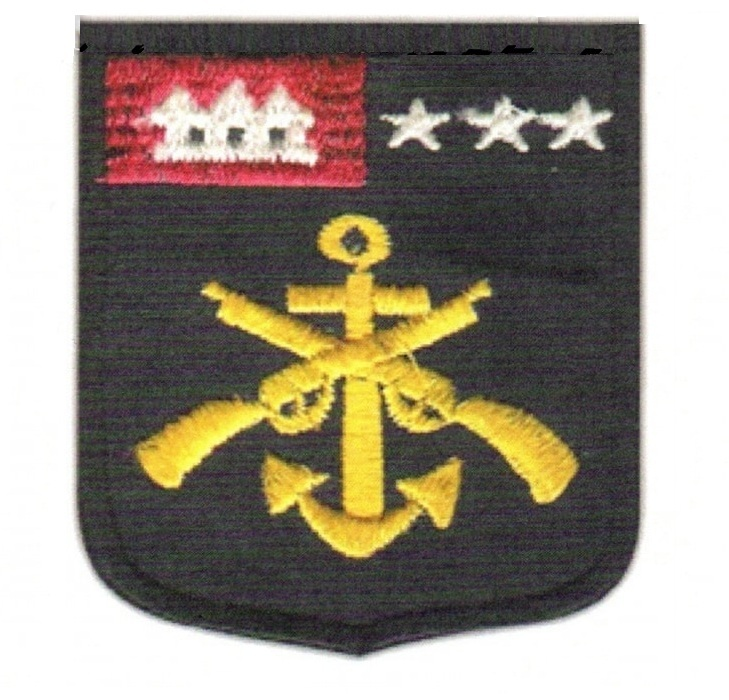
Cambodian Marine Corps shoulder patch (1970-1975)

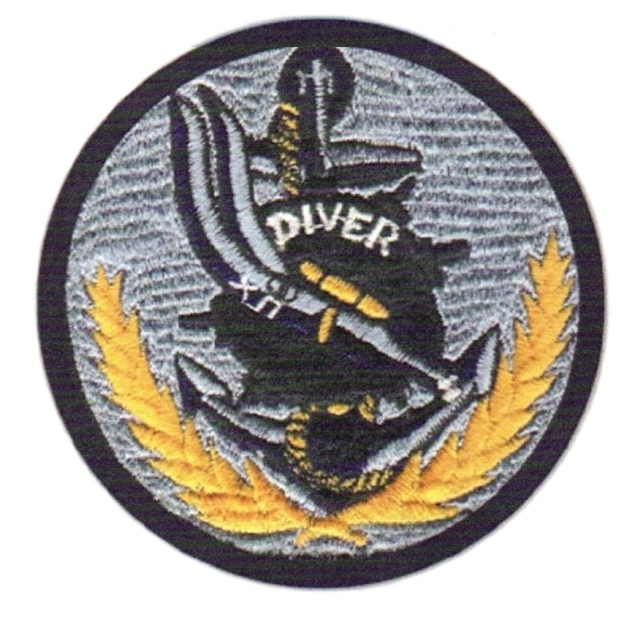
MNK Nageurs de Combat patch (1970-1975)

MRK strength in February 1970 stood at about 1,600 Ratings and seamen under the command of Captain Vong Sarendy, who crewed a small fleet comprising two flotillas (one sea and one riverine) and a training squadron. They were organized as follows:

- The Riverine Patrol Force (French: Force de Patrouille Fluviale – FPF), headquartered at the Chrui Chhangwar riverine Navy base operated one U.S. Landing Craft Infantry (LCI) used as a riverine support gunboat, three British Harbour Defence Motor Launches, four U.S. LCTs, one British LCT, and an unspecified number of LCM (6) and LCVPs.
- The Sea Patrol Force (French: Force de Patrouille Marítime – FPM), based at the Ream naval base operated one U.S. Landing Ship Infantry Large (LSIL/LCI) in the coastal support gunboat role, three U.S. PC-461-class Patrol Craft, three Chinese Yulin-class gunboats, two U.S. Rescue Boats, one French EDIC III-class LCT, three U.S. Light Tugs, plus some LCM (6) landing crafts.
- The Training Squadron (French: Escadron d'Instruction), allocated at the Naval Training School in Chrui Chhangwar, had four LCM (6) and two LCVPs employed for instruction purposes only.

The Navy's inventory also included a small number of American, Thai, and South Vietnamese riverine and sea craft seized while straying into Cambodian territory. The captured vessels comprised one River Monitor (H) Howitzer version (MON), one LCM (6) landing craft, and two LCVPs taken from the South Vietnamese Navy (VNN), plus two Hurricane Aircat airboats captured from the U.S. Special Forces (USSF) by the People's Army of Vietnam (PAVN) in September 1967 and one U.S. Navy LCU1466-class Landing craft utility that accidentally entered Cambodian waters in July 1968; in addition, ten Thai civilian fishing junks were apprehended after being washed ashore along the coast due to inclement weather.

Main naval bases were located at the Chrui Chhangwar Peninsula, which harboured the MRK headquarters', the Naval Training School, and the riverine flotilla outside Phnom Penh and at Ream; the latter served not only as the headquarters of the sea flotilla, but also of the Cambodian Marine Corps – comprising four naval infantry battalions (French: Bataillons de Fusiliers-Marins – BFM) maintained primarily for static defense, and a French-trained UDT-type Combat Swimmer Unit (French: Nageurs de Combat) employed in salvage operations, obstacle clearance, and underwater demolitions.

=== Reorganization 1970–1972 ===
Re-designated Khmer National Navy (French: Marine Nationale Khmère – MNK) on 9 October 1970, the Cambodian Navy and its fleet were given responsibility for escorting supply convoys on the lower Mekong-Bassac corridors. Such operations were carried out in conjunction with the Khmer Air Force (KAF), which began to provide since mid-1971 air cover to MNK convoys with their Douglas AC-47D Spooky gunships and later AU-24A Stallion mini-gunships. In addition, the Navy also provided logistic support (including troop transport and casualty evacuation) for the FANK ground forces. Shortly after the March 1970 coup, however, the French military mission suspended all the cooperation with the Cambodian armed forces, thus depriving the new MNK of vital training and technical assistance. During this phase, the MNK was assisted in its new roles by the South Vietnamese Navy, which lent extensive convoy protection to riverine commercial shipping and helped patrol the Cambodian coastline to prevent North Vietnamese infiltration attempts.

The MNK underwent a major reorganization program in late 1970, with the creation of two operational zones: a Riverine Region (French: Region Fluviale or RegFlu) headquartered at Chrui Chhangwar and a Maritime Region (French: Region Maritime or RegMar) headquartered at Ream; a Mekong Special Zone (French: Zone Speciale du Mekong – ZSM; later 12th Tactical Zone or Zone Tactique 12), also headquartered at Chrui Chhangwar was created in mid-1971 at Kandal Province, situated between the Cambodian Capital and the South Vietnamese border. The Sea Patrol Force and the Training Squadron remained untouched by these changes, though the Riverine Patrol Force was re-organized into three squadrons – the river patrol craft under the Riverine Patrol Division (French: Division de Patrouille Fluviale – DPF), the landing craft under the Assault Division (French: Division de Assault) and the transport vessels under the Logistics Support Group (French: Groupement de Soutien Logistique – GSL). These new formations, together with the Naval Infantry battalions, were under the direct command of Captain (promoted to Commodore in December 1971) Vong Sarendy, who in turn reported directly to the FANK Chief-of-Staff for operational orders.

As the newly restructured MNK had gained by late 1971 enough experience to commence its own escort and combat patrol operations, an expansion of its naval assets and support facilities, and training establishments was therefore deemed necessary. The two pre-existing Naval Bases were once again upgraded, while another two riverine stations were established on the lower Mekong corridor at Neak Leung in Kandal Province, and at the provincial capital of Kampong Chhnang, on the Tonle Sap River. To train officer cadets, a Naval Academy (French: École des Officiers de Marine) was established at Chrui Chhangwar in late 1971, and an Enlisted Man Training Center (French: Centre d'Instruction), which provided specialized courses for junior ranks was set up one Kilometer south of the Cambodian Capital. The MNK headquarters was moved from the old La Payotte vessel at Chrui Chhangwar to Phnom Penh, where it was provisionally allocated in a rented building at the Psar Thmei Central Market area before moving that same year to a permanent facility at the former French military mission compound in Norodom Boulevard near Wat Phnom.

By January 1972 the MNK had expanded to 5,500 men, this number including 430 officers, although only 23 of them held the rank of Lieutenant commander or higher, and these were showing signs of fatigue due to over-work. To alleviate this problem, an input of 14 Cambodian officers were sent to the United States to attend advanced courses at various U.S. naval training institutions. Eight students attended the U.S. Naval Academy (USNA) at Annapolis, Maryland, whilst two senior officers went to the Naval War College (NWC) in Newport, Rhode Island and the Navy Supply Corps School (NSCS) in Athens, Georgia; four other students attended the small boat tactics school at the Mare Island Naval Shipyard (MINSY) and the adjacent Naval Inshore Operations Center at Vallejo, California.

=== Harbour defense and special operations ===
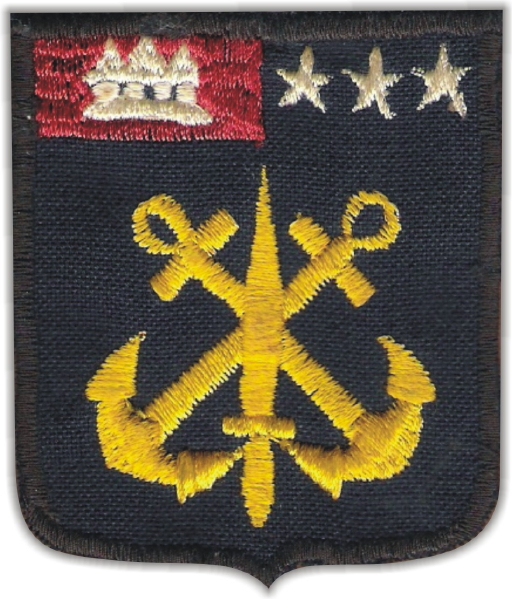
MNK Commandos de Choc shoulder patch (1972-1975)

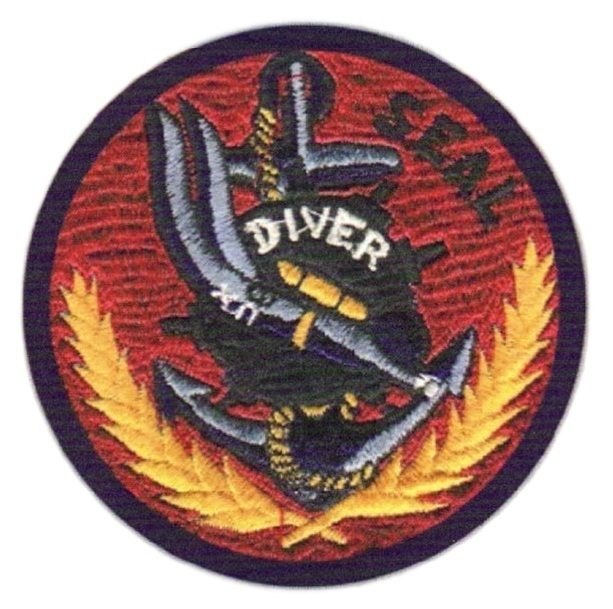
MNK SEALs patch (1973-1975)

Following several attacks against merchant vessels anchored at Chrui Chhangwar Naval Base in early 1972, the MNK Fleet Command created a regimental-sized Harbour Defense Unit, the "Strike Commandos" (French: Commandos de Choc) comprising two rifle battalions, to patrol its major port facilities and provide VIP protection, equipped with an assortment of outdated and modern U.S. and captured Soviet or Chinese small-arms. The 1st Strike Commando Battalion (French: 1ér Bataillon Commando de Choc – 1 BCC) and 2nd Strike Commando Battalion (French: 2éme Bataillon Commando de Choc – 2 BCC), based respectively at Chrui Chhangwar and Ream, were supported on their duties by the Naval Infantry, who performed active riverbank patrolling. An American-trained SEAL unit was raised in mid-1973, being employed on reconnaissance missions along the banks of the Mekong and as shock troops on amphibious operations, and was subordinated to the MNK Amphibious Operations Command (French: Commandement des opérations amphibies – COA).

=== Fleet Command ===
Emulating its South Vietnamese parent organization, the Cambodian Navy's Fleet Command was placed under the authority of the MNK Chief of Naval Operations, who was responsible for the readiness of all sea and river craft. The Fleet Commander assigned and scheduled vessels to operate on the Riverine and Maritime Regions, and the Mekong Special Zone, the latter turned over to the Cambodian Army Command in February 1975, which were home ported in Chrui Chhangwar and Ream naval bases and normally returned there after concluding their assignments. On the field, the two regional and zone commanders assumed control of all naval or amphibious operations on their respective Regions, and the vessels under their command operated from the following interland or coastal ports:

- Maritime Region – Ream/Kampong Som/Krong Koh Kong/Krong Kep
- Riverine Region – Chrui Chhangwar/Kampong Chhnang/Kampong Cham
- Mekong Special Zone – Phnom Penh/Neak Leung

=== Expansion 1973–74 ===
In 1970 the Cambodian Navy had only eleven vessels in serviceable condition, including two ageing PC-461-class Patrol Craft, three LSSLs, one LSIL, one LCI, one LCT and a few armed fishing junks to patrol both the coastline and its waterways. That same year, under the auspices of the Military Equipment Delivery Team, Cambodia (MEDTC) assistance program, the MNK began to receive an influx of modern American-made sea and riverine craft after the U.S. Navy disbanded its own Mobile Riverine Force (a.k.a. "brown-water Navy") in Vietnam, and handed over its units to his South-east Asian allies under the Vietnamization policy. Deliveries were accelerated in February 1972 and continued until 1974, allowing the MNK to standardize its equipment tables on U.S. lines and gradually phase out some of its obsolete, worn-out ex-French and Eastern Bloc craft from active service. The MNK also received some material aid from the Royal Thai Navy, in the form of nine small motorboats delivered in July 1971.

Initially expanded in December 1973 to 13,000–14,000 personnel, the MNK authorized strength ultimately reached by September 1974 a total of 16,500 men and women under the command of the Chief of Naval Operations, Commodore (promoted to Counter admiral in October 1974) Vong Sarendy, with one-third of its personnel being assigned to the Marines. The remaining 10,000 or so sailors and ratings crewed a surface fleet of 178 vessels of various types, though consisting mostly of patrol, coastal, and amphibious crafts.

== Shipyards and repair facilities ==
The MRK/MNK's major repair and resupply facilities were centered at the main riverine base at Chrui Chhangwar, with most vessel maintenance being accomplished at the Fleet Repair Facility, though they apparently experienced some difficulties in repairing heavily damaged vessels. In April 1972, an LCI assigned to the Riverine Region severely hit by enemy fire had to be sent to Singapore for a major overhaul. Most shore-based naval supplies were handled by the Chrui Chhangwar base's naval warehouses; lesser activities were carried out at some of the smaller coastal and river stations, such as the Koh Rong Sam Lem naval compound, located about 10 nautical miles (16.09 km) southwest of Kompong Som.

Whereas the Chrui Chhangwar base was able to maintain the smaller vessels, the Ream Naval Base was in a run-down condition by 1972. Built by the French in the late 1950s, it had only one small pier in decrepit condition, its internal repair capabilities were very limited and lacked an effective logistical support system. Plans were laid out by the MNK Fleet Command in early 1974 to renovate and enlarge Ream's naval facilities, and the measures implemented included the procurement of a newly overhauled floating drydock, the substantial upgrade of the base's own Repair Facility equipments, the installation of an effective supply support system, the construction of a modern pier facility and support complex, and the construction of a new electric power plant, although the three latter projects were still to be completed by the time of the collapse of the Khmer Republic in April 1975.

== Equipment ==
=== Escort and combat patrol craft ===
- Three PC-461 class Patrol Craft
- Three LSSLs
- 20 PCF/Inshore Mark Mk 1 and 2 coastal patrol crafts (also known as "Swift boats")
- 64 PBR Mk 1 and 2 river patrol boats (a.k.a. "Pibber")
- Seven Monitors (MON, heavily gunned riverine crafts, a.k.a. "River Battleships" or "Mike boats") – out of this number six were the Monitor (H) Howitzer version armed with 40 mm cannons and M49 105 mm howitzers
- One Monitor (F) version equipped with M10-8 Flamethrowers (a.k.a. "Zippo")
- Four Assault Support Patrol Boats Mk 1 (ASPB, a.k.a. "Alpha boats")
- Two Patrol Craft/Tug (YTL)

=== Troop transport, amphibious assault, and logistical operations craft ===
- One EDIC III-class Landing craft tank (LCT)
- Two LSIL/LCIs
- Four LCU/YFUs
- 18 Armored Troop Carriers (ATC, a.k.a. "Tango boats"), including three ATC refuelers and one ATC recharger
- 30 Landing Craft Mechanized Mk 6 Mod 1-LCM (6) Landing Craft Utility (LCUs)
- Five LCM (8) LCUs
- Two Landing Craft Vehicle Personnel (LCVPs)

=== Support craft ===
- Two Command and Communications Boats (CCB, a.k.a. "Charlie boats")
- Five Minesweeper River boats (MSR/MSM)
- One Combat Salvage Boat (CSB)
- Three Yard Tug Light (YTL)
- Two Mobile Support Bases (MSB)
- One Floating Crane (YD)
- One Drydock

== Combat history ==
Being an all-volunteer, technically proficient service, the Khmer National Navy was regarded as the most efficient branch of the Cambodian armed forces, despite being plagued by shortages of officers and experienced NCOs in the early stages of the war. However, unlike the Cambodian Army and the Khmer Air Force, the MNK was not seriously handicapped by corruption – despite the fact that Lieutenant General Sosthène Fernandez, the FANK Chief-of-Staff and Commander-in-Chief of the ANK, did use the Navy to collect protection money for guarding river transport services in which his family had investments –, constant changes in command, or military incompetence, though it did faced severe budgetary restraints after U.S. financial aid was slashed in 1973. Under the command of Counter admiral (Rear Admiral) Vong Sarendy, the MNK generally maintained high levels of efficiency, discipline and morale – mainly due to sufficient rice rations, good leadership in the field and prompt payment of wages. Since the MNK was not highly dependent from on U.S. air support provided by Operation Freedom Deal (except on the Bassac-lower Mekong corridors), it was not adversely affected when it was terminated on 15 August 1973.

=== Sea operations 1970–75 ===
For the first three years of the war, the small and ill-equipped MNK Sea Patrol Force based at Ream proved unable to protect effectively the 400 kilometers (248.55 miles) of Cambodian coastline from North Vietnamese infiltration attempts. The coast from Ream to the Thai border was patrolled haphazardly at best by MNK's aging coastal vessels, so surveillance of the coastline from Ream to the border with South Vietnam was consequently passed to the South Vietnamese Navy. The importance of patrolling at sea became clear in April 1972, when VNN patrols reported the first attempt by a North Vietnamese Navy vessel to infiltrate Cambodia's territorial waters. The enemy vessel was intercepted and sunk by the MNK, with heavy secondaries.

Due to the shortage of assets, protection of Ream Naval Base and the deep water port of Kampong Som was largely neglected, which rendered them vulnerable to enemy frogman attacks – on the night of 20–21 January 1973 North Vietnamese frogmen managed to inflict slight damage on a cargo ship anchored at Kampong Som harbour. By 1974 this state of affairs had been corrected by the MNK Fleet Command, after the implementation of several counter-measures which included the stationing of newly received 20 radar-equipped PCF coastal patrol crafts at Ream and of four PBR river patrol boats in the Kampong Som port area, followed by the overhauling of nearly all of the older heavy craft still in the inventory.

=== Amphibious operations 1973–74 ===
Apart from convoy escort duties on the lower Mekong, resupply missions of governmental garrisons, routine patrolling along the Tonle Sap River and counter-insurgency operations coordinated with the Cambodian Army's Lake Brigade in the namesake adjoining lake, the Cambodian Navy's riverine forces also mounted a series of notable amphibious operations, codenamed "Castor" (French word for Beaver), in support of Naval Infantry battalions and FANK ground forces units fighting the Khmer Rouge in several conventional battles:

- On 24 August 1970, the MNK riverine flotilla carried out its first amphibious operation when they transported by landing craft four infantry battalions and four airborne battalions to relieve Prek Tameak, a government outpost threatened by the PAVN, located 14 km (8.70 mi) northeast of Phnom Penh on the eastern bank of the Mekong.
- During the Battle of Kampong Cham in September 1973, the MNK Fleet Command launched Operation "Castor 21", in which the Navy ran some twenty convoys between Phnom Penh and Kampong Cham. They conducted a successful combined amphibious assault by the Marines, SEALs and the Cambodian Army's 80th Infantry Brigade into the enemy-held half of the city, although the inept use of the landing crafts led to heavy losses as the boats on the river were exposed for six hours to enemy fire from the riverbanks.
- In October 1973, the MNK riverine forces mounted Operation "Castor 27", a three-day amphibious operation in support of the Cambodian Army's 2nd Infantry Division elements operating south of Ta Khmao, along the northern bank of the Bassac river in Kandal Province.
- In January 1974, during Operation "Castor 41" a task-force of nine river Monitors and landing crafts supported three Marine companies in a small-scale amphibious assault to clear Khmer Rouge forces out from the Peam Reang island in the southern Mekong.
- In March 1974, two small operations, "Castor 45" and "Castor 46", were organized in support of Marine and Army units deployed around Dei Doh, on both banks of the Mekong.
- That same month at the Battle of Oudong, the MNK carried out its second large-scale amphibious assault, Operation "Castor 50", during which another task-force of assault landing crafts was ferried up the Tonle Sap river to retake Oudong, the capital of Oudong Meanchey province from the Khmer Rouge, who were waiting for them at the predicted landing site with B-40 rocket launchers and Type 56 75 mm recoilless rifles. Although the MNK task-force lost one Armoured Troop Carrier, two LCM (8) LCUs and one LCM (6), and some 25 soldiers were killed at debarkation, they did manage to deliver thirty M113 APCs, six trucks, four M101A1 105 mm towed field howitzers, and no less than 2,740 Marine and Army troops, who succeeded in recapturing the burn-out town.

In addition to amphibious assault operations, during the early part of 1973 the MNK riverine forces were also encharged of the defense of the waterborne approaches to Phnom Penh and its environs. This included providing protection to vital areas such as the FANK's main fuel reserve facility located at Prek Phnou in Kampong Speu province.

=== Final operations 1974–75 ===
As the 1974–75 dry season opened, the already hard-pressed MNK saw its effectiveness being immediately curtailed by the Khmer Rouge's extensive mine-laying campaign on the Bassac and Mekong rivers, intended at blocking the passage of the supply convoys that allowed the beleaguered Khmer Republic to receive much-needed munitions, fuel and non-lethal aid (including food and medical supplies) transported upriver from South Vietnam to Phnom Penh. Chinese-made submerged floating river mines had been employed early in the war by the North Vietnamese against both military and civilian commercial shipping along the Mekong River, but never at such a scale. Although the MNK did possess minesweeping capabilities, its five river MSR/MSM minesweepers lacked the proper equipment that would allow their crews to carry out the task successfully. In addition, the Khmer Rouge control of the riverbanks rendered any mine-sweeping operations virtually impossible or, at best, extremely costly. On 18 January 1975, the MNK riverine forces and the Marines conducted their last joint amphibious assault, Operation "Sailor", in an effort to clear Khmer Rouge units from some strategic islands in the Mekong close to Phnom Penh. By 17 February, the MNK Fleet Command was forced to abandon any attempts to re-open the lower Mekong and Bassac corridors, and all convoy escort operations were suspended.

With the loss of the two remaining Government-held enclaves located south of Phnom Penh of Ban Am (callsign "Sierra One") and Neak Leung, along with its respective river station (callsign "Sierra Two") in the lower Mekong on 1 April, all Cambodian Navy river assets were pulled out from the area to help defend Phnom Penh, thus completing the strangulation of the Cambodian capital. This move however, rendered useless the entire MNK riverine flotilla which remained bottled-up mainly at Chrui Chhangwar base, with a small number of other vessels being withheld at Kampong Chhnang riverine station and Kampong Cham fluvial harbour during the final weeks of the war. Faced with the imminent Khmer Rouge victory in April 1975, MNK vessels of the Sea Patrol Force based at Ream lost no time in evacuating along the coast refugees to safety. On 17 April, the day Phnom Penh fell, two PC-461 class Patrol Craft (E-311 and E-312), one LSIL (P-111), one LCI (P-112) and three PCFs overloaded with Navy personnel and their civilian dependents left Cambodian territorial waters. E-311 managed to escape safely to neighbouring Thailand whilst the three PCFs, overloaded with 625 refugees, arrived on 22 April at Kelantan, Malaysia; as for the E-312, P-111 and P-112 vessels, they arrived on 9 May at Subic Bay in the Philippines with 750 passengers. In addition, four PBRs, two Monitor (H) Howitzers and one Assault Support Patrol Boat were impounded by the South Vietnamese authorities at Tân An, Long An Province in South Vietnam, which prevented their destruction or capture by the Khmer Rouge.

== Aftermath ==
By the end of the war in 1975, total Cambodian Navy losses amounted to a quarter of its ships and 70 percent of its sailors had been killed or wounded in action. The rest of the MNK personnel that were unable to leave Cambodia – ranging from Petty Officers, enlisted men and the female clerical staff to Marines, Nageurs de Combat, SEALs and the Commandos de Choc (who defended both the Ream and Chrui Chhangwar naval bases until the very end) – had no other choice but to surrender. Most of them ended up being shot by Khmer Rouge firing squads, with their bodies dumped into shallow graves dug in forest areas close to naval facilities; others were sent to be "re-educated" in labour camps (known as the "Killing Fields"), where they remained until the Cambodian–Vietnamese War of 1978–79. Later unconfirmed reports claim that a small number of qualified naval personnel escaped this fate by being pressed into service of the new Khmer Rouge regime in order to operate and maintain the remaining U.S.-made sea and river craft left behind, and to help train ship crews.

Many naval officers were also executed, including Counter admiral Vong Sarendy, who missed several opportunities to leave Phnom Penh and was reportedly arrested and killed by the Khmer Rouge while trying belatedly to escape by boat to the Tonle Sap lake the day Phnom Penh fell, though other sources state that he actually committed suicide when the insurgents were about to enter his office at the MNK Fleet Command Headquarters in the Chrui Chhangwar Naval Base. Of the 103 ratings that graduated from the Naval Academy in 1973, only three are known to have survived the Khmer Rouge's massive purges.

The Khmer Rouge was able to salvage one PC-461 class patrol craft, 13 coastal patrol "Swift boats", 40 PBR Mk 1 and 2 "Bibber" river patrol boats and five LCM (8) LCUs for the Navy of the Kampuchea Revolutionary Army (NKRA) of the new Democratic Kampuchea Regime; the other sea and river vessels were found damaged beyond economic repair, either sunk by enemy fire or scuttled by their own crews. At least seven NKRA's "Swift boats" were later lost during the Mayaguez incident on 15 May 1975, on which one of the boats was sunk by a U.S. Air Force AC-130 gunship, and the other six were either completely destroyed or severely damaged by U.S. Navy A-6A Intruder and A-7E Corsair II attack jets. Despite maintenance problems and spare parts' shortages, the remaining nine coastal patrol "Swift boats", the PBR river patrol boats and the LCUs were kept serviceable at Ream and Chrui Chhangwar naval bases until February 1979, when the NKRA was neutralized by the People's Army of Vietnam during the Cambodian–Vietnamese War of 1978–79.

== MRK and MNK Commaders ==
=== Chiefs of Naval Operations ===
- Captain Pierre Coedes (1954–1969)
- Counter admiral Vong Sarendy (1969–1975)

=== Naval junior commanders ===
- Captain Pok Som Im
- Captain Som Sary
- Captain Vong Sophano
- Captain Srey Doeun
- Commander Thuon Tyro
- Commander Nguon Binh

== Naval uniforms and insignia ==
The Royal Cambodian Navy owed its origin and traditions to the French Far East Naval Forces (French: Forces Maritimes en Extrême-Orient – FMEO) of the First Indochina War, and even after the United States took the role as the main foreign sponsor for the Khmer National Armed Forces at the beginning of the 1970s, French military influence was still perceptible in their uniforms and insignia.

=== Service dress and field uniforms ===
The basic Royal Cambodian Navy (MRK) work uniform for all-ranks was a local version of the French Navy's tropical working dress, consisting of a Pale Stone (a shade of grey so pale that is sometimes referred to as "pale khaki" due to its similarity to the latter colour) cotton shirt and pants modelled after the WWII U.S. Army tropical "Chino" khaki working dress. The shirt was short-sleeved and came in two variants: the first model was based on the French M1949 tropical shirt (French: Chemisette kaki clair Mle 1949) and had two patch breast pockets closed by clip-cornered straight flaps whilst the second model resembled the French M1946 light shirt (French: Chemisette kaki clair Mle 1946) and featured instead two pleated breast pockets closed by pointed flaps; both shirts had a six-buttoned front and were provided with shoulder straps (French: Epaulettes). They were worn with matching Pale Stone slacks styled after the French M1945/52 or M1948 pants, which featured two pleats at the front hips, side slashed pockets and an internal pocket at the back, on the right side; Pale Stone shorts (French: Culotte courte kaki clair Mle 1946) were also issued and worn according to weather conditions. A white cotton version of the MRK work uniform also existed, being worn as a service dress by officers on informal occasions and for walking-out. Enlisted personnel also received a white cotton service uniform or Sailor suit, consisting of a Navy jumper (or pullover shirt) with dark blue flap collar and matching trousers flared as "bell bottoms".

MRK senior officers and petty officers adopted a Navy Blue overseas service uniform, which consisted of a double-breasted reefer jacket (French: Vareuse) with open collar and lapels, and featuring two internal skirt pockets with external flaps. The jacket had a narrow double row of four gilt metal anchor motif buttons, and was worn with a white shirt and black tie, completed with matching blue trousers. This uniform was seldom seen in Cambodia, being worn only by officers or officer candidate students attending courses overseas, e.g. when in France or in the United States. Instead, MRK Officers serving in-country received the standard FARK summer dress uniform in white cotton, which was patterned after the French Army M1946/56 khaki dress uniform (French: Vareuse d'officier Mle 1946/56 et Pantalon droit Mle 1946/56). The jacket had two pleated breast pockets closed by pointed flaps and two unpleated at the side closed by straight ones whilst the sleeves had false turnbacks; the front fly and pocket flaps were secured by gilt buttons bearing the royal coat-of-arms. It was worn with a white shirt and black tie on formal occasions.

For parades and honor guards, Naval Infantry officers and enlisted men were given a special full dress white cotton uniform, which consisted of a tunic with standing collar featuring a five-buttoned front secured by gilt buttons, worn with matching white slacks. Cambodian Marine officers and enlisted men were issued the same French all-arms M1947 drab green fatigues (French: Treillis de combat Mle 1947) as their Royal Army counterparts.

All the aforementioned uniform combinations were maintained by the MNK after 1970 and new regulation sets were added. In 1974, graduates of the Cambodian Naval Academy attending courses overseas received a new parade uniform, apparently patterned after the U.S. Navy Officers' Blue Working Dress. The new cadets' blue full dress consisted on a six-buttoned shirt lacking shoulder straps with two unpleated patch breast pockets closed by pointed flaps and long sleeves with buttoned cuffs, and matching trousers. In formal occasions, the shirt was worn with a black tie tucked into the front fly. Female personnel were issued white summer dress and working Pale Stone M1946-style short-sleeved blouses based on their male counterparts' versions, except that the blouse front fly closed on the left side, and were worn with matching summer dress white or working Pale Stone knee-length skirts; the latter was often replaced by "Chino"-style pants on service dress.

Like their Army and Air Force counterparts, in 1970–72 all naval combat and support personnel – officer candidate students (EOMs) attending courses at the Naval Academy, clerical staff, ship crews, Naval Infantry, Nageurs de Combat and later the Commandos de Choc security battalions – were issued U.S. jungle OG 107 utilities and M1967 Jungle Utility Uniforms whilst the Cambodian Navy SEALs commandos formed in 1973 received "Highland" (ERDL 1948 Leaf pattern or "Woodland") and Tigerstripe camouflage fatigues from the United States, Thailand (Thai Tadpole), and South Vietnam (Tadpole Sparse). Olive green U.S. M-1951 field jackets were also issued to all-ranks.

=== Headgear ===
MRK officers and petty officers received a Pale Stone service peaked cap with the standard gilt metal FARK cap badge, based on the French M1927 pattern (French: Casquette d'officier Mle 1927) but with a longer, lacquered black leather extended peak; a white summer top version was worn with both the white service dress and the full dress uniform. After March 1970, the MNK replaced the royal insignia on their peaked caps by a gold wreathed foul anchor embroidered on black, with the number of leaves varying according to rank – ten for officers and petty officers, and six for NCOs (enlisted men wore a simple anchor badge instead). A white Sailor cap with an inscribed black silk ribbon (tally) tied around the base bearing the "Khmer National Navy" title in Khmer script, was worn with the white service uniform by enlisted ranks.

In the field, MRK sailors and naval infantrymen frequently wore a mixture of French M1946 light khaki tropical berets (French: Bérét de toile kaki clair Mle 1946), French M1946 and M1957 light khaki sidecaps (French: Bonnet de police de toile kaki clair Mle 1946 and Bonnet de police de toile kaki clair Mle 1957), and French M1949 bush hats (French: Chapeau de brousse Mle 1949) in Khaki or OG cotton cloth. During the Republic, a wide range of OG Boonie hats and baseball caps from the United States, South Vietnam and Thailand were adopted by MNK personnel. Officer candidate students at the Naval Academy received a Navy Blue baseball-style cap with the standard MNK cap badge whilst white and Pale Stone baseball-style caps, with stiffened peak and standard MNK cap badge inserted on a square-shaped Navy Blue background patch placed on the front panel, were worn by female personnel with their white summer dress and working Pale Stone uniforms. Both the Commandos de Choc and the Cambodian SEALs adopted in 1973 a black beret worn French-style pulled to the left with the MNK cap badge placed above the right eye, replaced in the field by bush hats, baseball caps, berets or head scarves in both Highland and Tigerstripe camouflaged cloth.

The steel helmet models worn by MRK vessel crews and marines alike were the U.S. M-1 or the French M1951 NATO (French: casque Mle 1951 OTAN) models, standard issue in the FARK. The naval infantry battalions later standardized on the M-1 1964 model provided with the U.S. Army M59 Mitchell "Clouds" camouflage pattern cover (an embroidered yellow foul anchor motif was often added to the latter in his front panel), though many ship crewmen and naval gunners continued to wear the older U.S. and French steel helmets throughout the war. On parade, the marines were issued white-painted M-1 helmet liners with the standard FARK cap badge stencilled at the front and colour bars painted at the sides, worn with a white chinstrap; after 1970, a FANK cap badge stencil replaced the earlier royal arms.

=== Footwear ===
MRK footwear was diverse. Ratings and sailors were issued black, brown, and whitened leather low laced shoes matching the dress uniforms worn on active service, walking-out or formal occasions. For parades, Naval and Marine officers and enlisted men were turned out in French black leather M1952 ankle boots (French: Brodequins Modèle 1952) and white French-style half-gaiters with side-lacing and a spat covering the top of the boot; Naval Academy cadets favoured white American-style long gaiters upon the adoption of their blue full dress in 1974. On the field, both seamen and naval infantrymen wore brown leather U.S. M-1943 Combat Service Boots and French M1953 "Rangers" (French: Rangers modéle 1953) or French Pataugas olive canvas-and-rubber jungle boots, white low tennis shoes, flip-flops and leather peasant sandals. After 1970, the MNK retained the earlier regulation footwear although American M-1967 black leather boots with DMS "ripple" pattern rubbler sole and Jungle boots, Canadian Bata tropical boots and South Vietnamese black canvas-and-rubber Indigenous Combat Boots soon replaced the older combat models.

=== Navy ranks ===
The MRK used the same standard FARK/FANK French-style rank chart as the Army and the Khmer Air Force, though the nomenclature was different. Flag, senior and junior officers (French: Officiers généraux, officiers supérieurs et officiers subalternes) – including their counterparts in the Naval Infantry – and petty officers' (French: Officiers mariniers) ranks were worn on various coloured removable shoulder boards (with gold laurel-like leaf embroidery on the outer edge for Admirals) or shoulder strap slides identical to the Army pattern, with the addition of a miniature royal coat-of-arms featuring a combined crown-and-anchor device on the inner end. Enlisted men and Marine NCOs (French: Quartier-maîtres et matelots/fusiliers) wore chevrons on both upper sleeves. In 1970 the MNK changed the colours of their shoulder boards and shoulder strap slides to a standardized Navy Blue or black with a simple foul anchor on the inner end, which replaced the earlier royal crest. Naval and marine officers and NCOs adopted rank chest tabs to wear with the U.S.-supplied OG jungle fatigues, although Army-pattern metal pin-on collar rank insignia also came into use in 1972.

=== Rank insignia ===
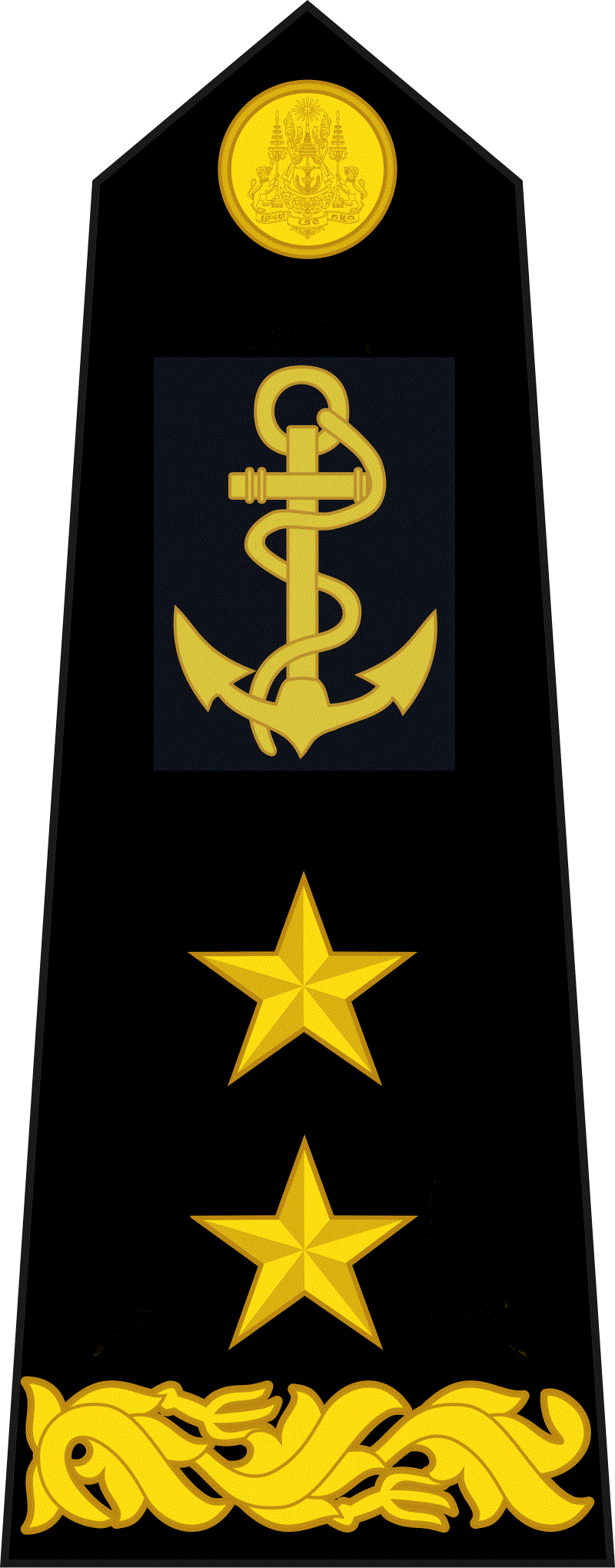
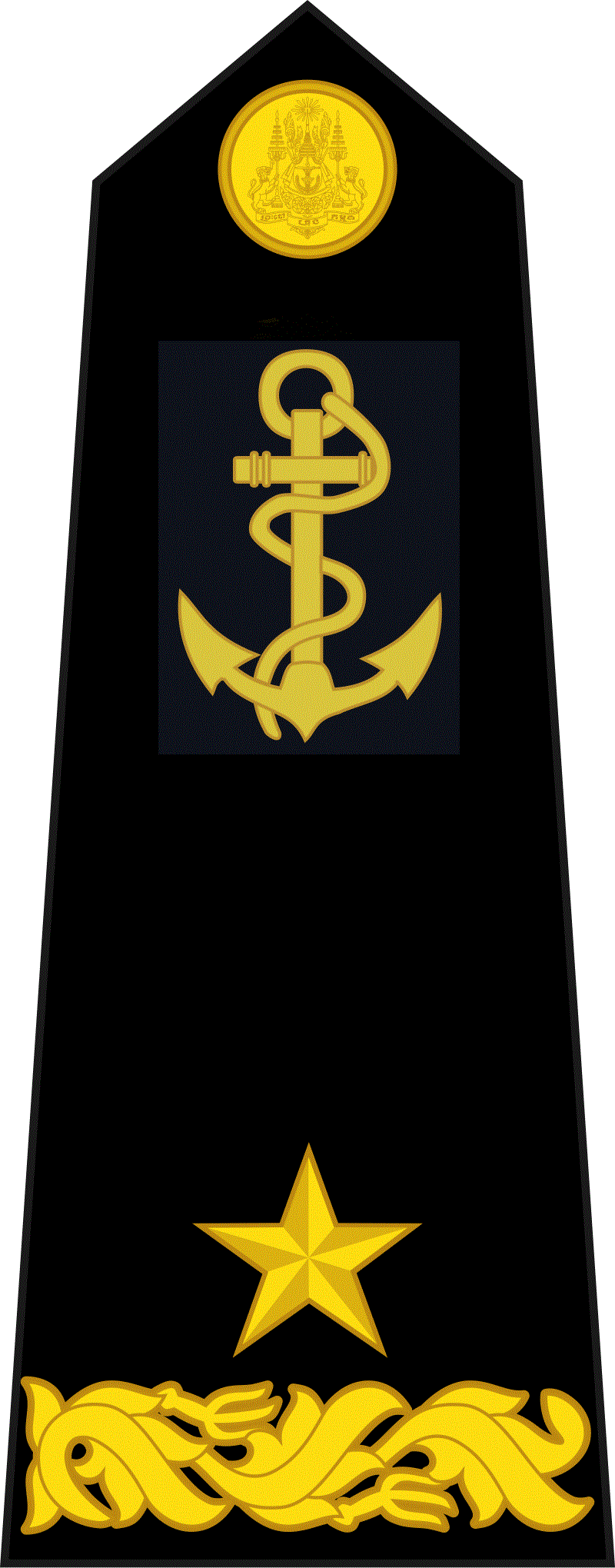
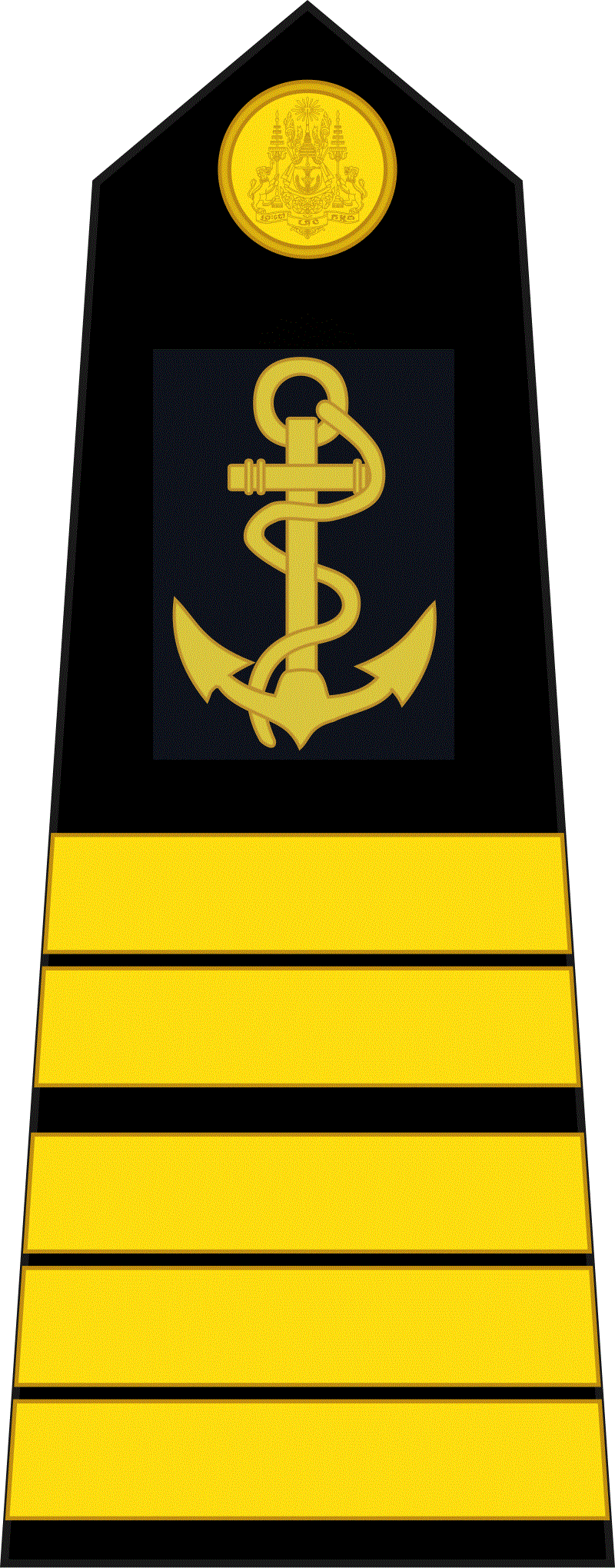
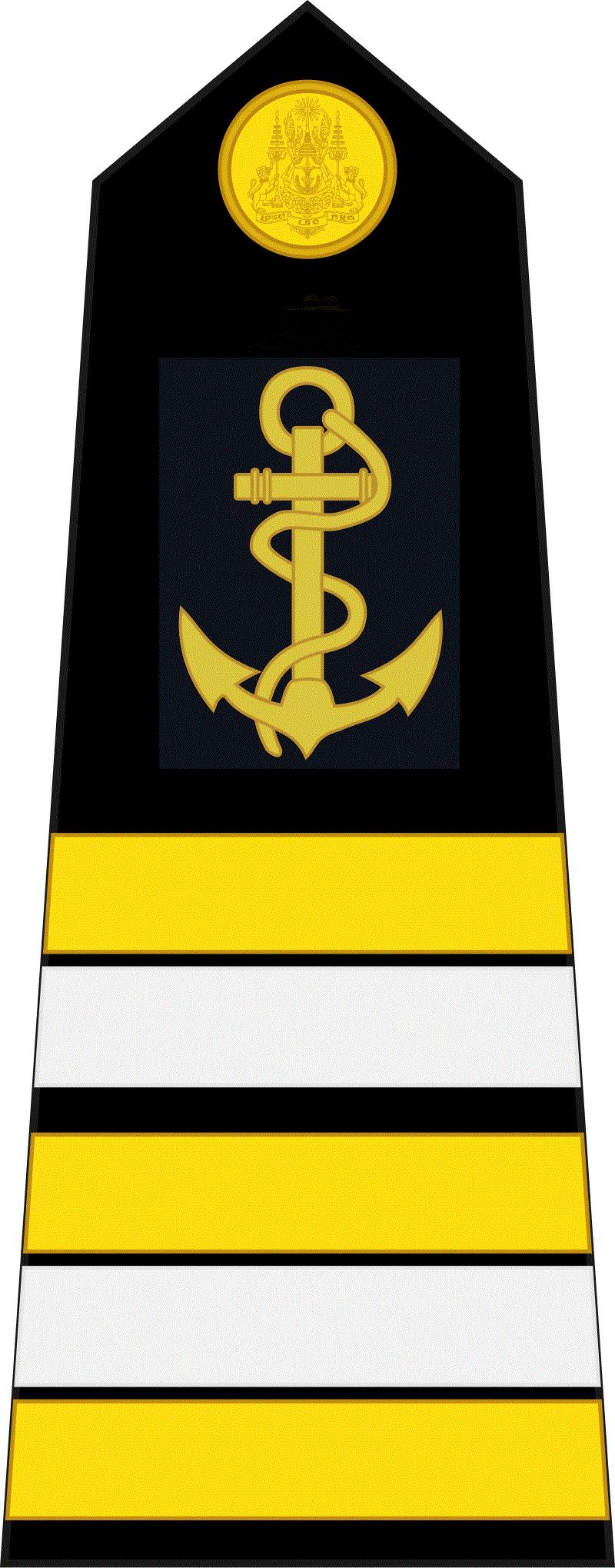
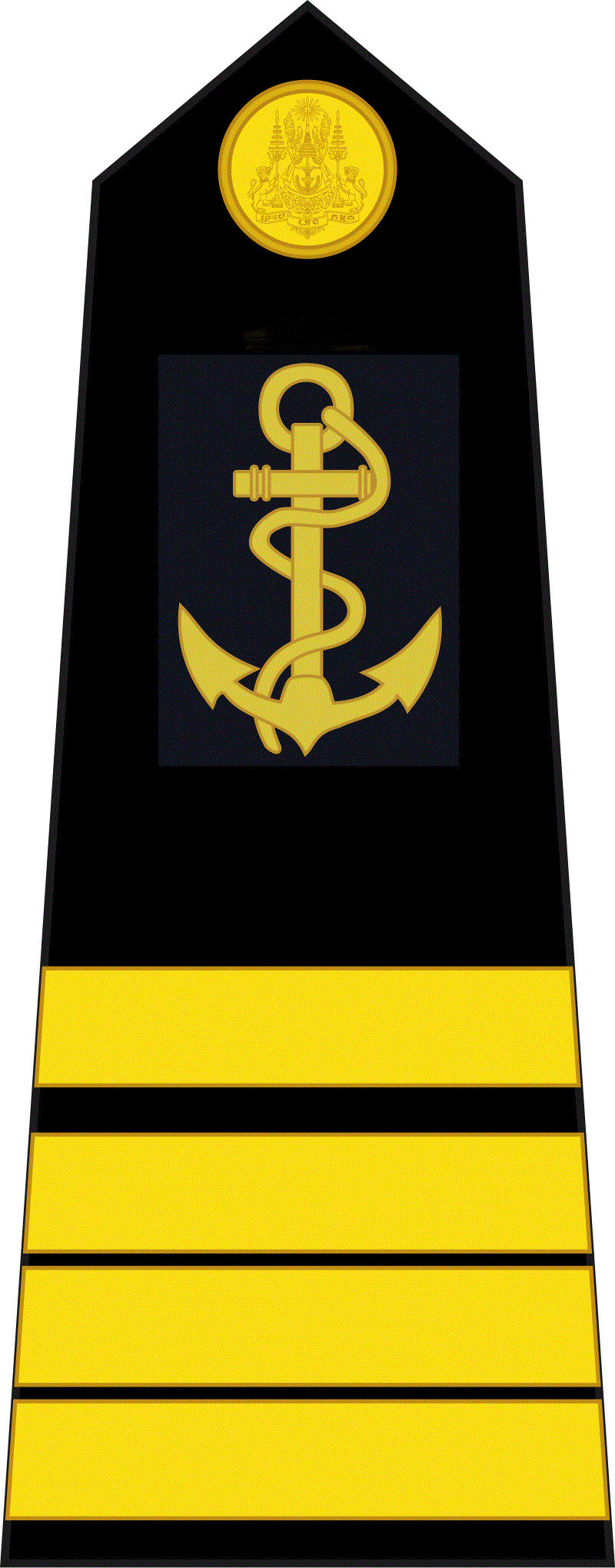
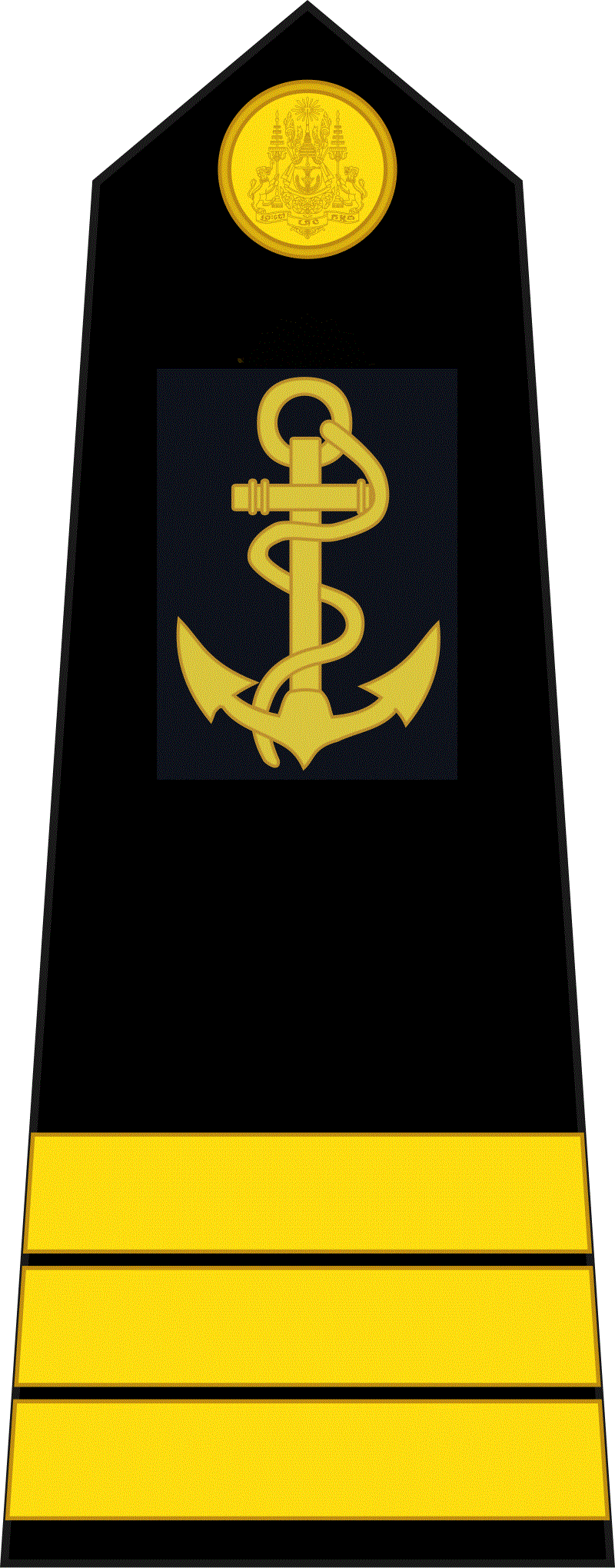
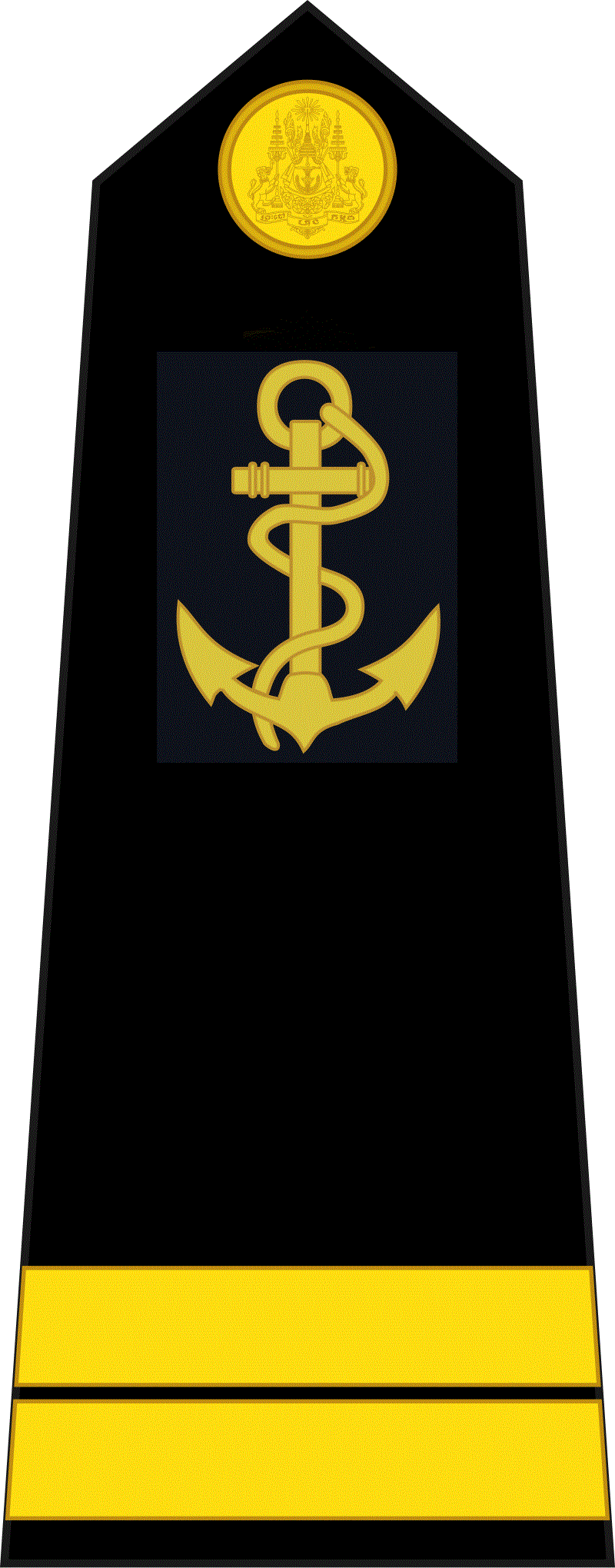
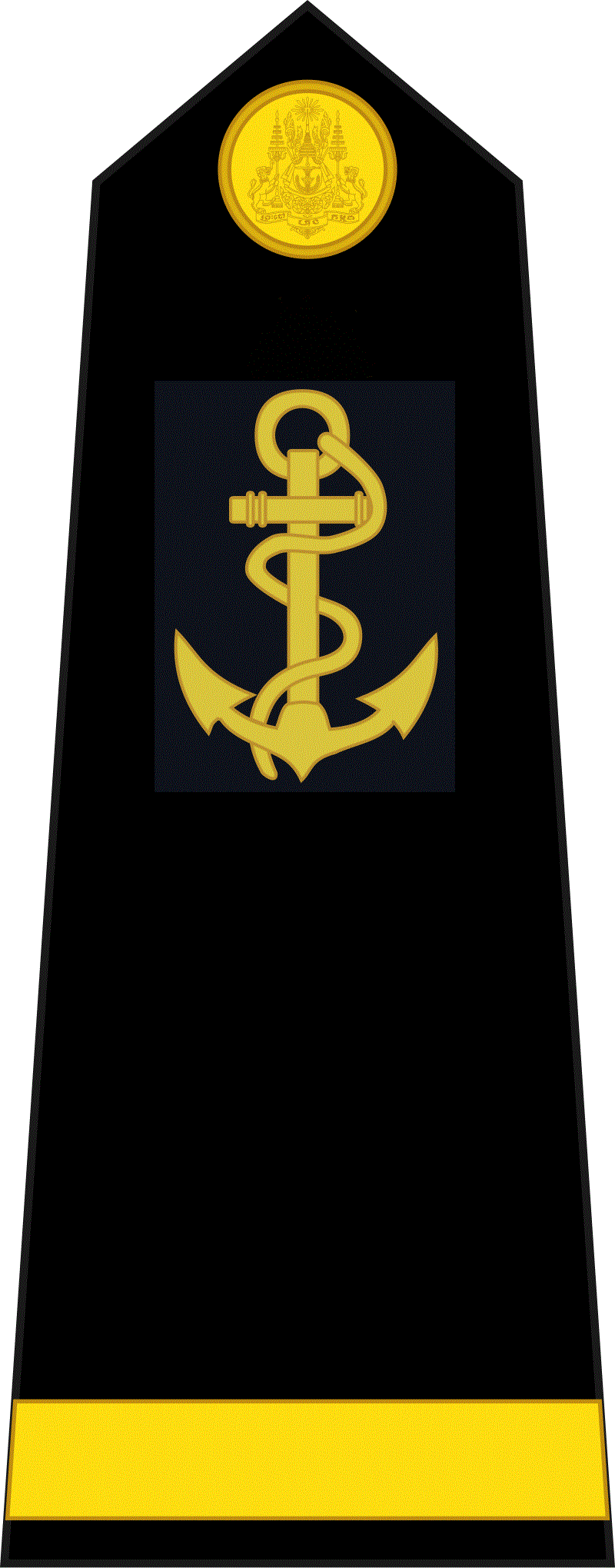
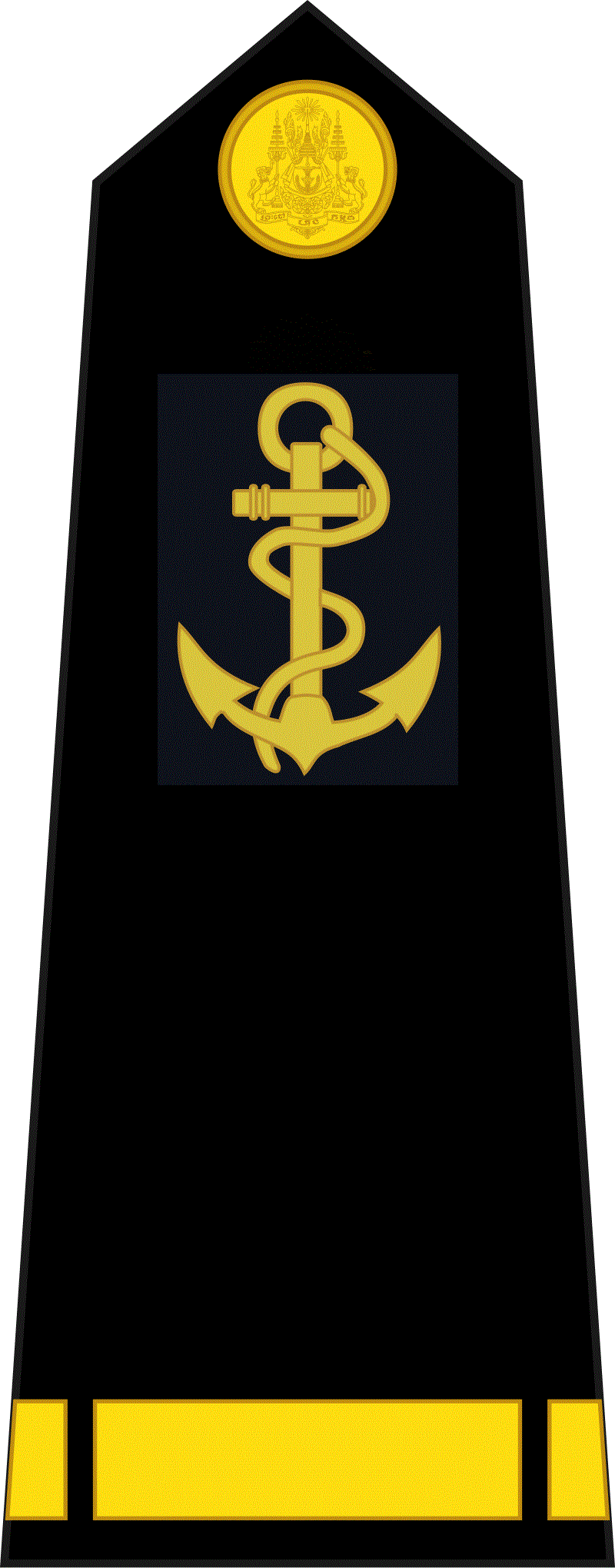
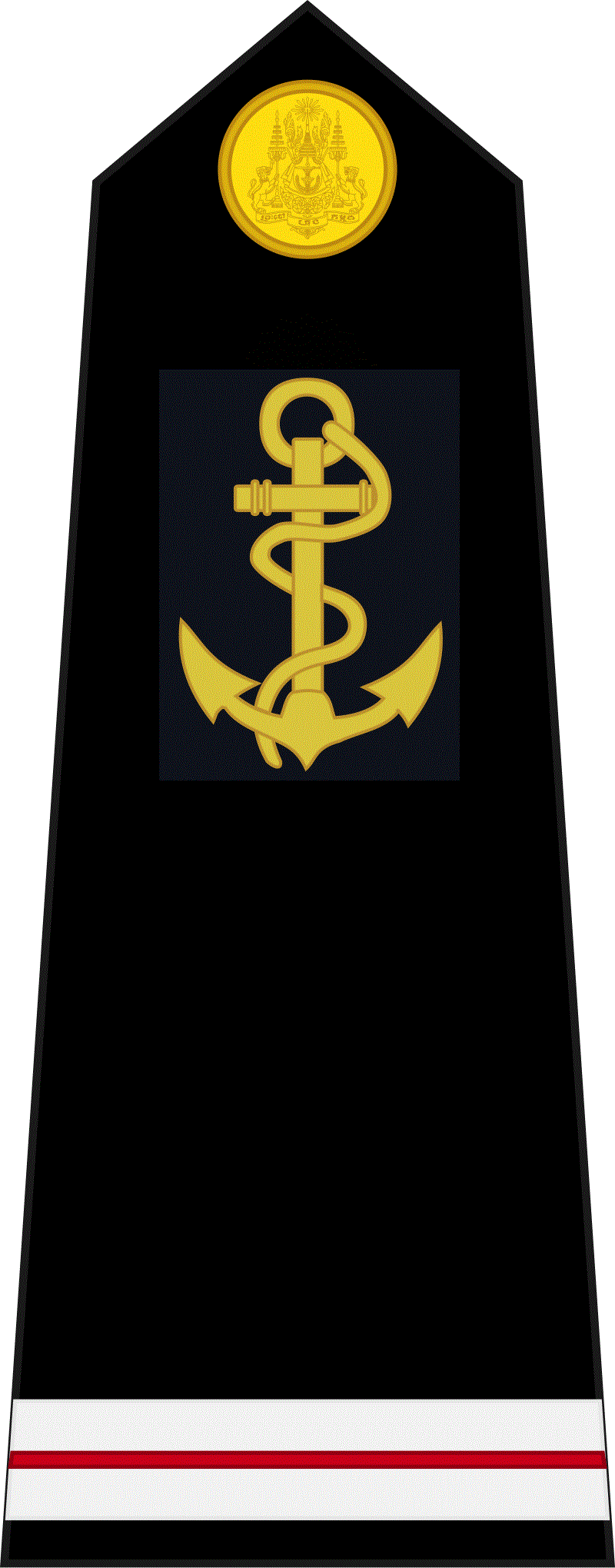
(Khmer Republic) Khmer National Navy
(Khmer Republic) Khmer National Navy	Contre-Amiral; Odam say ney tor	Amiral; Odam say ney trəy	Capitaine de vaisseau Vorak say ney ek	Capitaine de frégate Vorak say ney tor	Capitaine de corvette Vorak say ney trəy	Lieutenant de vaisseau Aknu say ney ek	Enseigne de vaisseau de première classe Aknu say ney tor	Enseigne de vaisseau de deuxième classe Aknu say ney trəy	Aspirant; Prɨn baal aek	Maître Principal; Pʊəl baal too

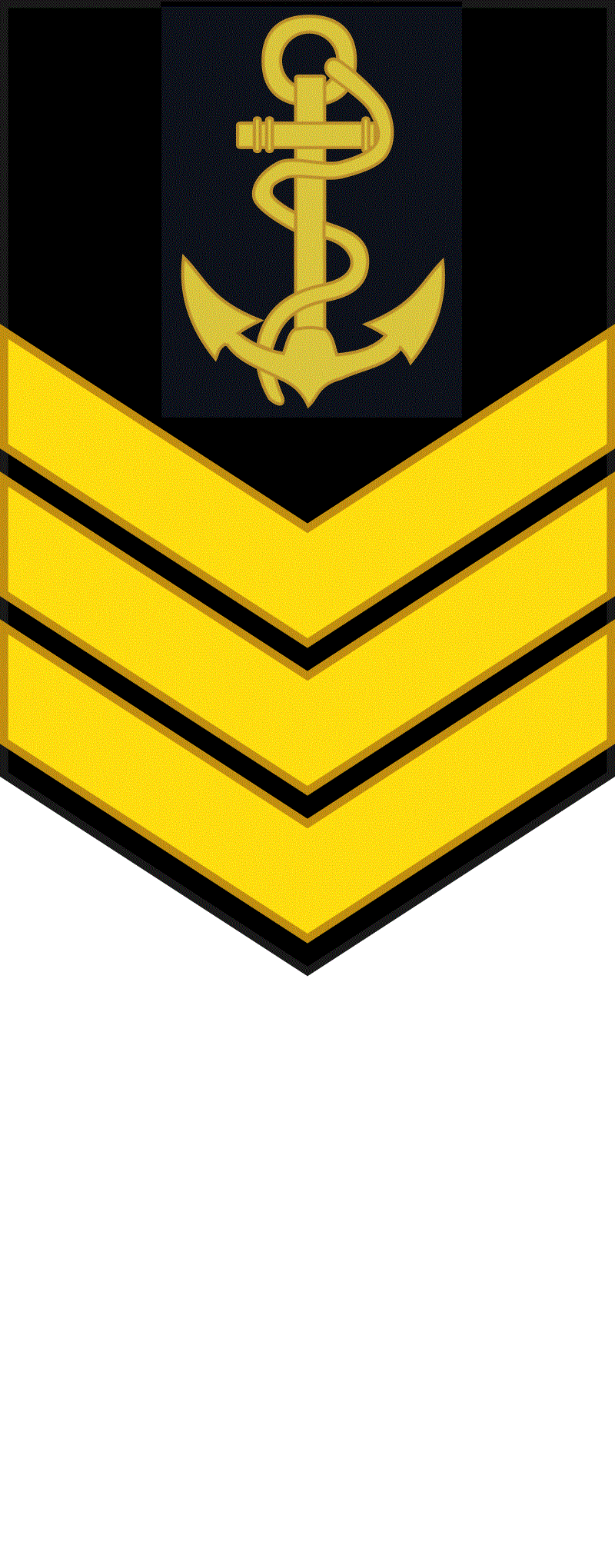
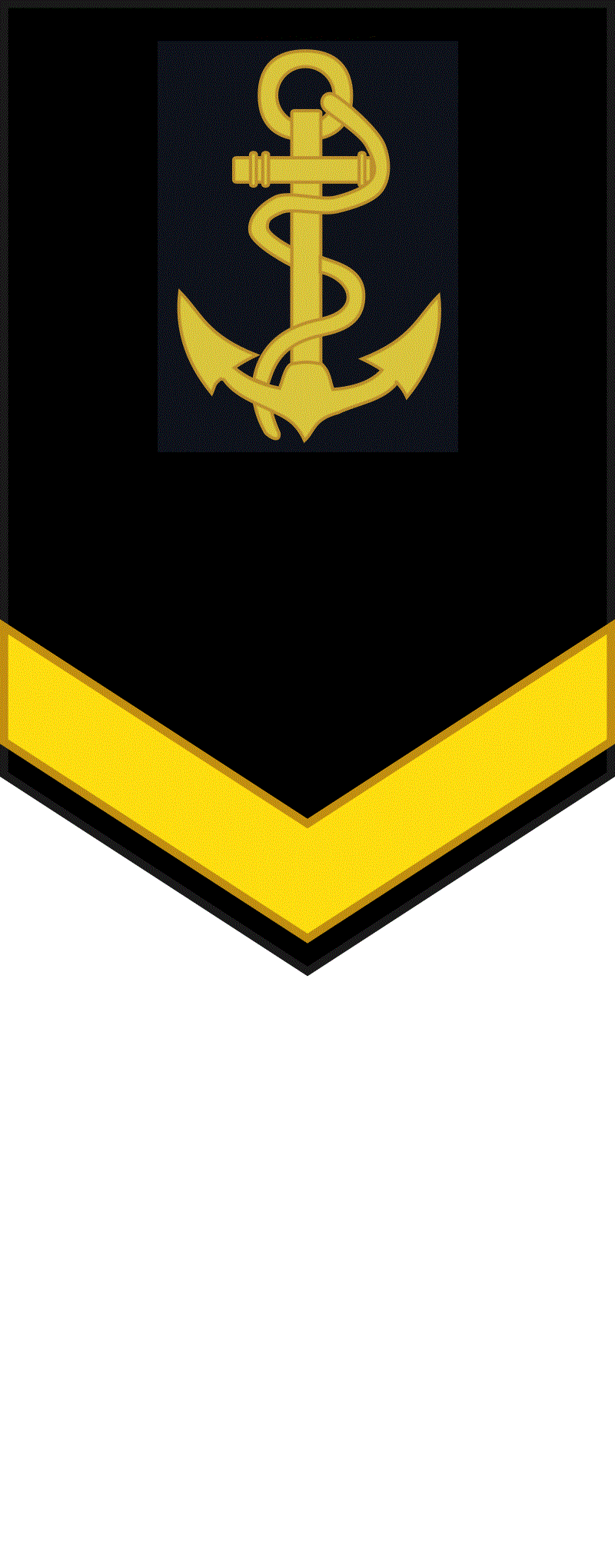
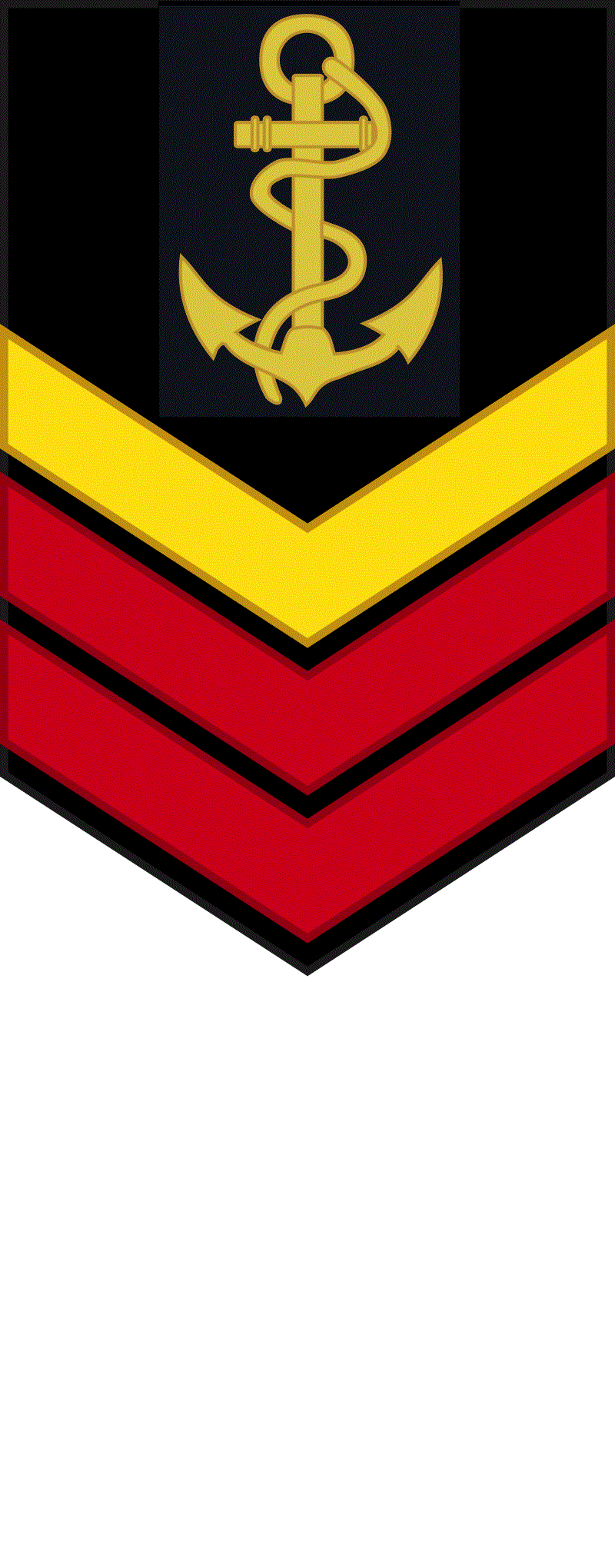
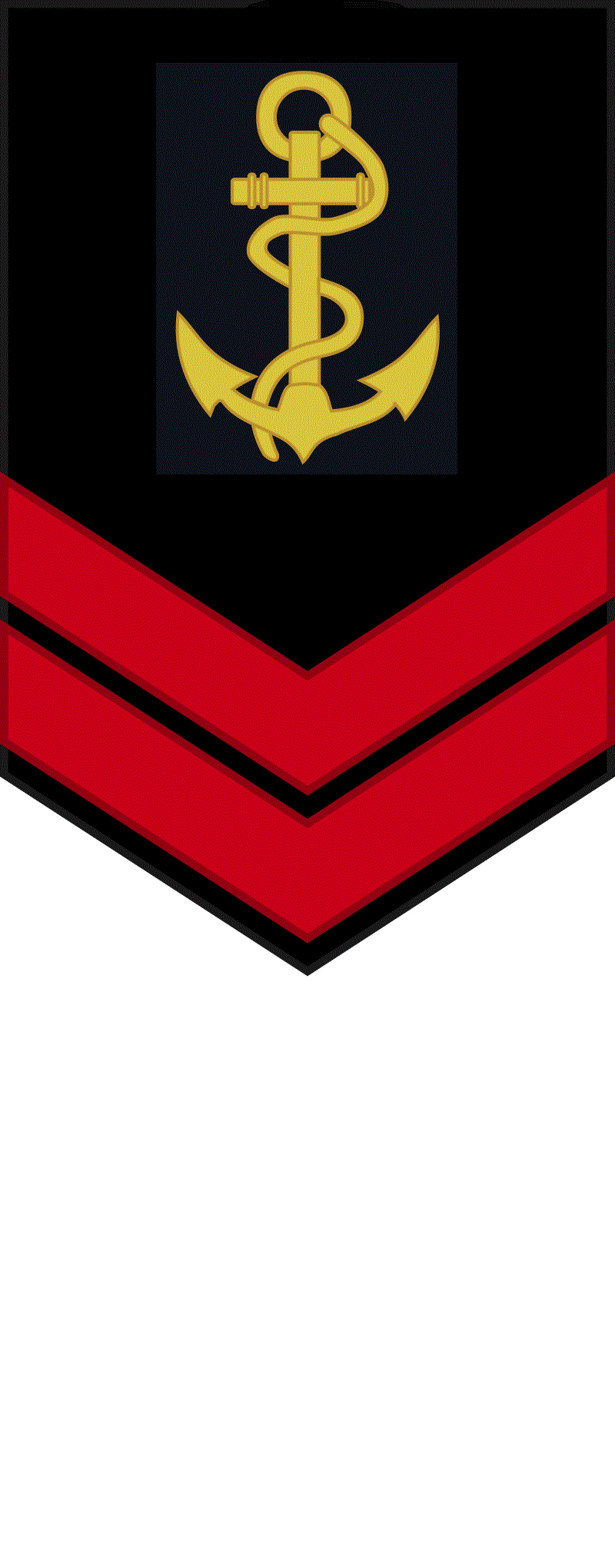
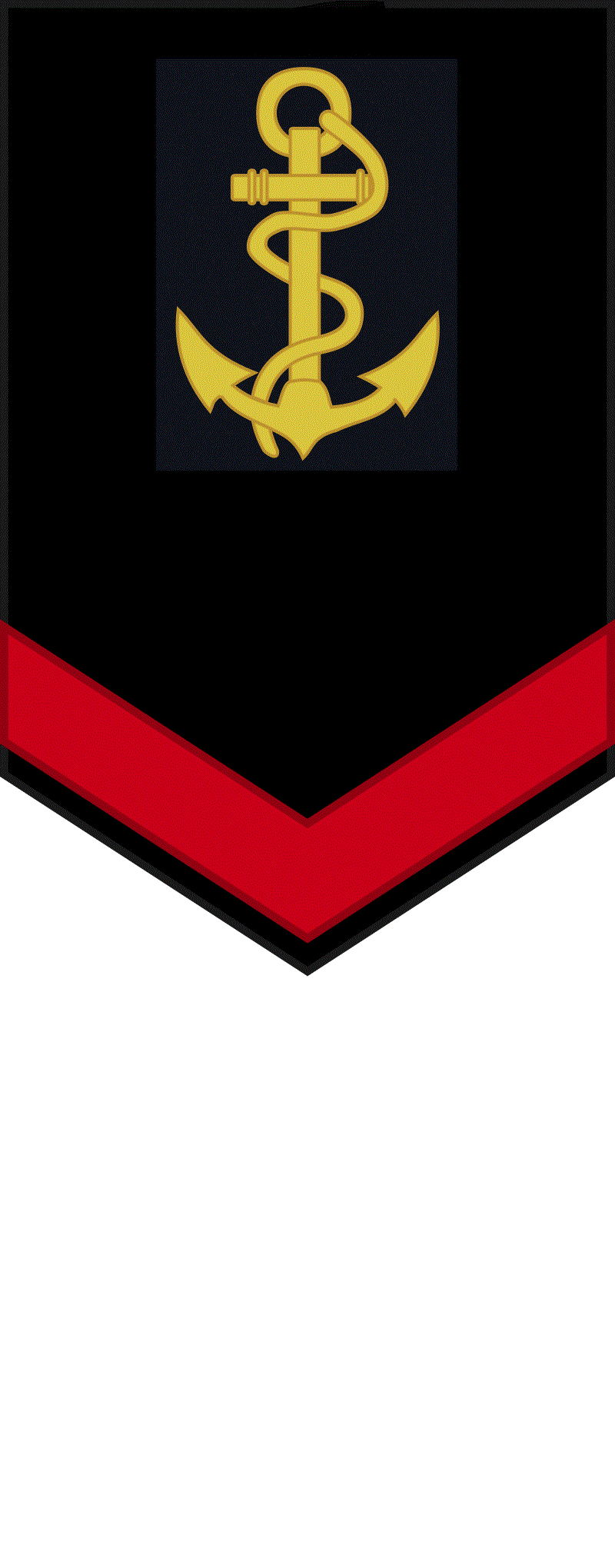
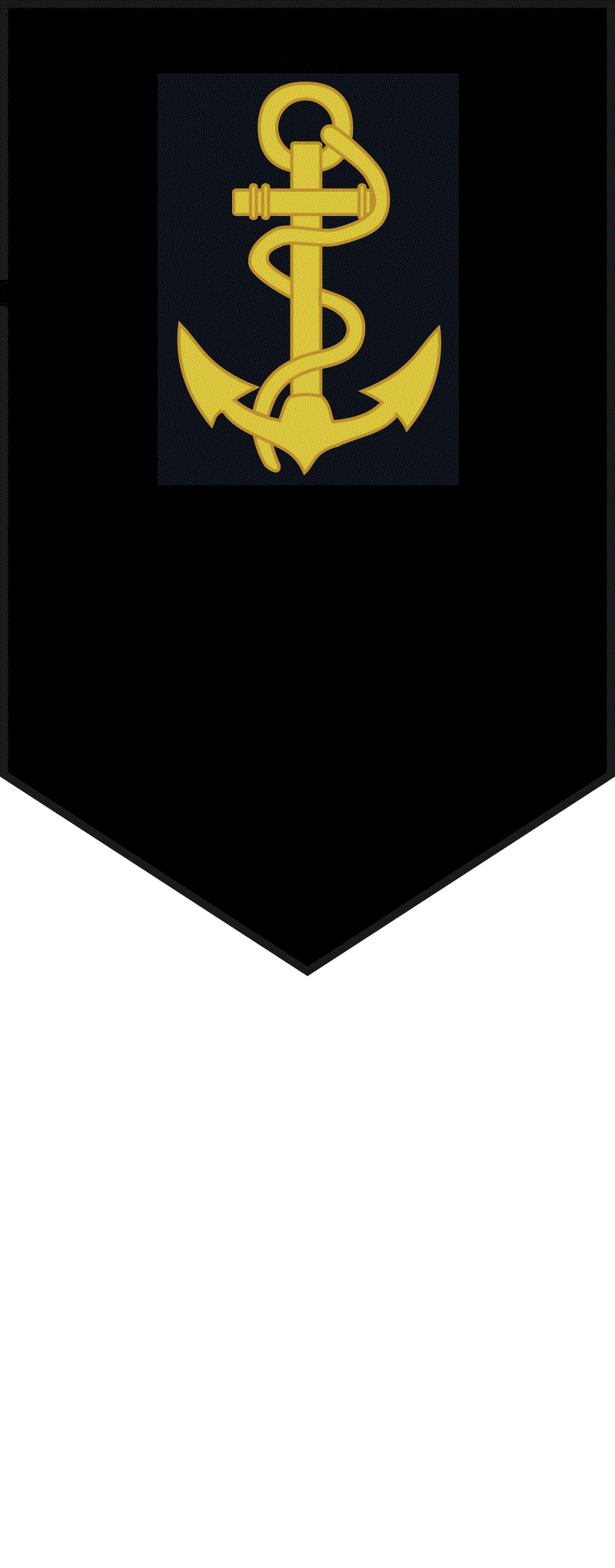
(Khmer Republic) Khmer National Navy
(Khmer Republic) Khmer National Navy	Premier Maître; Pʊəl baal too	Maître; Pʊəl baal trəy	Second Maître; Niey aek	Quartier Maître Chef; Niey too	Matelot breveté Pʊəl aek	Matelot/Fusilier-marin; Pʊəl too

=== Insignia ===
There were no arm-of-service designations as such in the Khmer National Navy, although when wearing U.S. OG jungle fatigues, naval personnel skills and trades were identified by collar badges, in either metal pin-on or cloth embroidered versions. These were worn on the left collar only by ratings and on both collars by enlisted ranks:

- Navigator (Manuvrier) – pair of binoculars superimposed upon crossed signal flags
- Helmsman (Timonier) – six-spoked helm wheel
- Radio operator (Telegrafiste) – lightning bolt superimposed upon a flying spinning wheel or cutter
- Gunner (Canonier) – crossed cannons
- Armourer (Armurier) – cannon superimposed upon a cogwheel
- Machinist (Mechanicien) – boat propeller inserted on a cogwheel
- Electrician (Electricien) – dynamo with six lightning bolts
- Quartermaster (Fourrier/Fourrière) – five-pointed leaf
- Clerk (Secretaire) – crossed writing plumes
- Shipyard Artificer (Ouvrier naval) – crossed axes
- Steward/Stewardess (Maître d'Hotel/Maîtresse d'Hotel) – laurel-leaf wreath over a three-wave line
- Commissary/Storekeeper (Commissaire) – lotus flower
- Civil Engineer (Ingénieur Civile) – Buddhist temple tower and anchor inserted on a cogwheel
- Marine Rifleman/Naval Infantry (Fusilier-Marin) – crossed rifles

MNK personnel after 1970 wore over the left pocket of their Pale Stone working or service dress white shirts a cloth embroidered badge featuring two crossed anchors inserted on a wreath surmounted by three stars, all in yellow outlined black on a Pale Stone or white background. A subdued version was worn with the OG jungle fatigues. Cloth Navy Blue and subdued nametapes were worn over the right shirt or jacket pocket on OG jungle fatigues and Pale Stone working and service dress white uniforms; Navy Blue plastic nameplates with white lettering were occasionally worn with the Navy Blue overseas service dress over the left breast and the working uniform on the right breast.

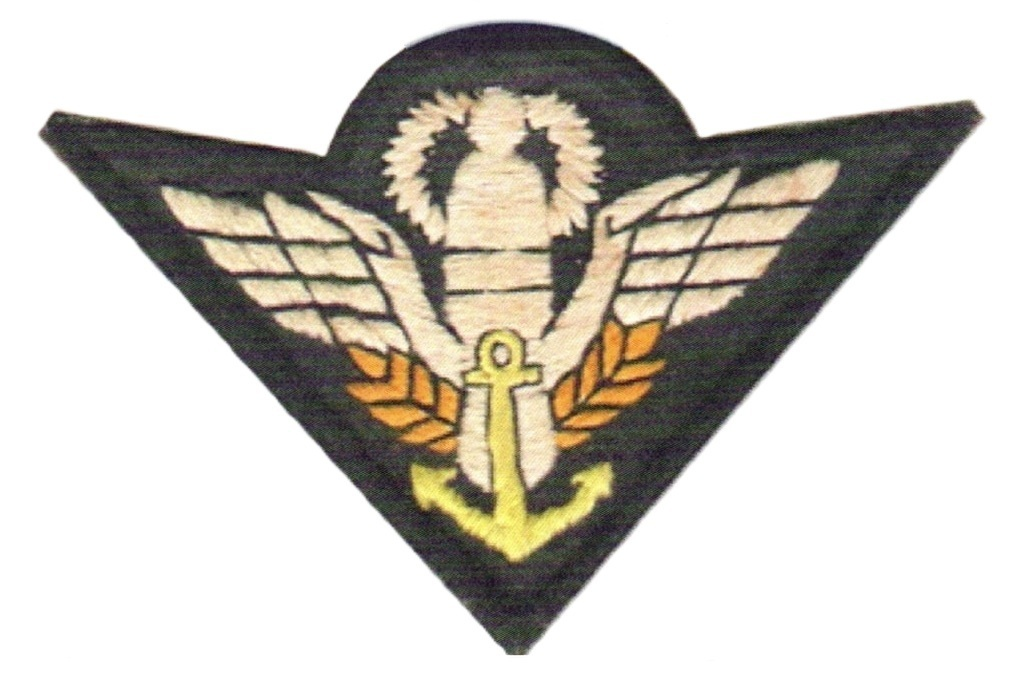
Cambodian SEALs parachutist wings (1973-1975)

The MNK had several several unit and qualification insignia, the former being worn on the left shoulder and the latter on the right chest. Specialised services within the Khmer National Navy wore full-colour cloth embroidered shield insignia on their upper left sleeve, although Nageurs de Combat and SEALs wore their round unit patches on the right pocket of their fatigue shirts instead. All Naval Infantry battalions (BFMs) wore the same shoulder insignia, consisting of a combined yellow crossed rifles and anchor device embroidered on a shield-shaped patch patterned after the Khmer Republic flag. The Commandos de Choc security battalions wore a similar patch, featuring a combined yellow crossed anchors and a Commando dagger pointed upwards. In addition to their battalion insignia, Marine riflemen serving in the BFMs were entitled to wear collar tabs featuring two yellow crossed rifles embroidered on a Navy Blue cloth background. SEALs cloth embroidered parachutist wings, consisting of a combined winged Scuba set, leaves and anchor device, were displayed above the right breast pocket, whilst foreign airborne qualification badges went over the left pocket as per in the Army. MNK personnel assigned to a specific Maritime or Riverine Region wore the correspondent insignia on the upper right sleeve, whilst MNK Headquarters insignia also went to the right shoulder.

MNK officers were entitled to wear on the right pocket of their working uniforms and jungle fatigues a full-colour cloth embroidered Navy Blue round patch with two white crossed anchors set on a yellow wreath. This patch came in two versions: one with a yellow star superimposed on the crossed anchors was worn by line officers (former officer cadets that had undergone training for the command of a vessel at the Khmer Naval Academy) whereas those without the star were given to non-line officers. When sent for training overseas, MNK officers wore on the upper left sleeve of their Navy Blue overseas jackets and Pale Stone working shirts a Cambodian national emblem with "Marine Nationale Khmère" tab, or a simple rectangular flash bearing "Khmer Republic" inscribed in either French or Khmer script on a Cambodian national flag background.

== See also ==
- Battle of Kampot
- Battle of Oudong
- Brownwater Navy
- Cambodian Civil War
- Cambodian Marine Corps
- Kampuchea Revolutionary Army
- Kampuchean People's Revolutionary Armed Forces
- Khmer National Armed Forces
- Khmer Republic
- Khmer Rouge
- List of weapons of the Cambodian Civil War
- Mayaguez incident
- Mobile Riverine Force
- Operation Freedom Deal
- Royal Cambodian Armed Forces
- Royal Cambodian Navy
- Royal Lao Navy
- South Vietnamese Navy
- Vietnam People's Navy
