= Vong Sarendy =

Cambodian admiral (1929–1975)

Sarendy Vong
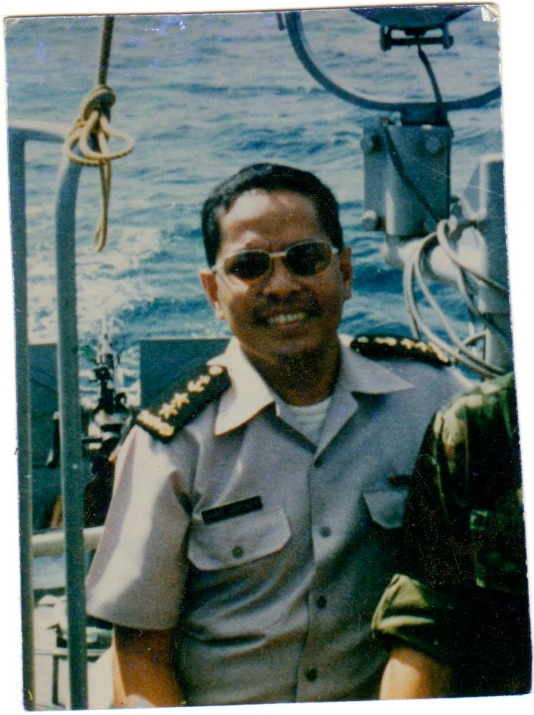
- Vong Sarendy, c.1974
- Born: 3 October 1929; Phnom Penh, Cambodia, French Indochina
- Died: 17 April 1975 (aged 45); Phnom Penh, Kampuchea
- Military career
- Allegiance: First Kingdom of Cambodia; Khmer Republic
- Branch: Royal Cambodian Navy; Khmer National Navy
- Service years: 1957–1975
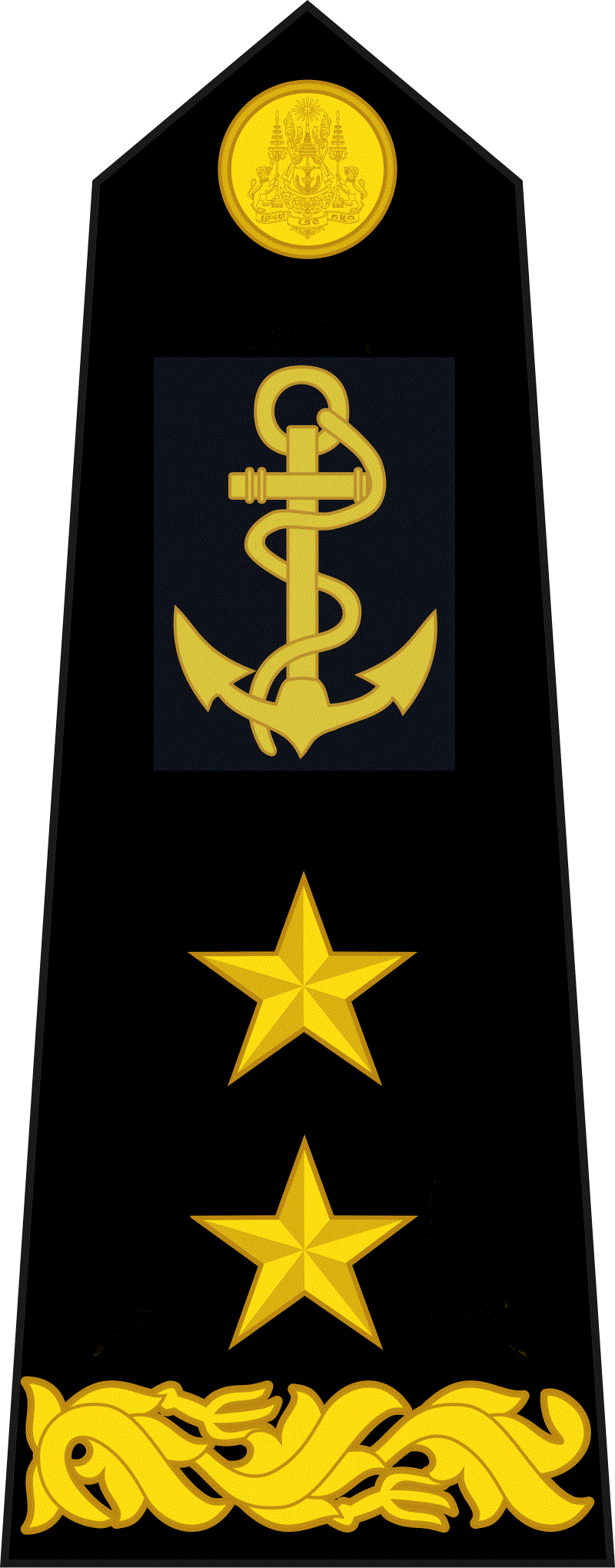
- Rank: Commodore
- Commands: Admiral of the fleet and member of the Cambodian Supreme Committee, 1975
- Conflicts: Cambodian Civil War

Sarendy Vong (3 October 1929 – 17 April 1975) was a Fleet Admiral in the Khmer Republic. He held his most prominent position as the head of the Khmer National Navy (MNK) from 1970 to 1975 and as a member of the Supreme Committee which ran the Khmer republic during the Phnom Penh siege. Vong committed suicide on 17 April 1975 to avoid the persecution of the Khmer Rouge as well as the orders of Angkar after taking over the capital city.

== Early and personal life ==
Sarendy Vong was born in Phnom Penh on 3 October 1929. During his childhood, he lived in the village of Mong in Battambang province. At age 11, after the death of his father, the incumbent village chief, he travelled to Phnom Penh with his older brother to finish his studies. After graduation, Sarendy commenced his military studies in France. In 1963, he married Nareine Saphon. The couple have had 3 children.

== Military career ==
=== Education ===
Following graduation in 1954, Sarendy Vong received a scholarship to the naval school of Brest in France. He completed his military studies and upon his return to Cambodia in 1957, was appointed Commander of Ream naval base. In 1963, he left his post for a military fellowship in Monterey, California, US but departed following John F. Kennedy's assassination, 2 months before schedule. His internship was cancelled as a result of King Sihanouk's professed allegiance with the People's Republic of China during the Vietnam War. In 1968, Vong spent a 2-year internship in the prestigious École Militaire in Paris. Following his return to Phnom Penh, he was promoted to Capitaine de vaisseau and 2nd in commandment of the MRK.

=== Marine Nationale Khmère ===
In the wake of King Sihanouk's removal from power, the Royal Khmer Navy was re-designated as the Khmer National Navy. As a result, Vong ascended to the rank of Admiral of the fleet and replaced former superior Pierre Coedes as the head of the Naval forces. With the United States as allies, the newly proclaimed Khmer Republic received an influx of standardized equipment and crafts. By September 1974, the MNK saw its personnel size increase tenfold, with 16,500 men under Vong's command. Nowadays, Vong Sarendy is recognized as one of the most notable commanders of the Khmer National Navy.

=== Cambodian Coup of 1970 ===
According to a declassified CIA report from 14 August 1970, a secret council named "The Revolutionary Committee" staged and planned the coup that led to the removal of Prince Sihanouk from power and to the creation of the Khmer Republic. Vong Sarendy was listed as one of the committee's twelve members.

=== Cambodian Civil War ===
Admiral Vong Sarendy was credited for maintaining high levels of efficiency, discipline and morale in the ranks of the Khmer National Navy during the Cambodian Civil War, mainly due to sufficient rice rations, good leadership in the field and prompt payment of wages. Unlike the Cambodian Army and the Khmer Air Force (KAF), the MNK was not seriously handicapped by corruption – despite the fact that Lieutenant General Sosthène Fernandez, the FANK Chief-of-Staff and Commander-in-Chief of the ANK, did used the Navy to collect protection money for guarding river transport services in which his family had investments –, constant changes in command, or military incompetence, though it did faced severe budgetary restraints after U.S. financial aid was slashed in 1973.

On 12 April 1975, the United States government carried out operation Eagle Pull, the evacuation of the U.S. embassy staff and of all remaining U.S. citizens from besieged Phnom Penh as well as acting president Saukham Khoy. Following his departure, a seven-member Supreme Committee headed by Lieutenant general Sak Sutsakhan, which included Admiral Vong Sarendy, former prime-ministers Long Boret and Hang Thun Hak, Op Kim Ang and Brigadier general Ea Chhong (Chief-of-Staff of the Khmer Air Force), assumed the authority over the collapsing Republic. On 17 April 1975, Phnom Penh began to fall to the Khmer Rouge forces. Vong's MNK headquarters in the Chrui Chhangwar Peninsula (11.583°N 104.916°E) across the Tonle Sap river from Phnom Penh was encircled and a final phone call to head of state Sak Sutsakhan confirmed the dissolution of the supreme committee. On the committee's 5th day in office, Vong committed suicide as the insurgents entered his office in the Chrui Chhangwar Naval Base.

== In popular culture ==
=== Shadow Over Angkor ===
Vong Sarendy makes a short appearance in King Sihanouk's 1969 film Shadow Over Angkor (Ombre sur Angkor), where he portrays an officer in the Khmer Royal Navy. Ironically, the film is centered around a plot to overthrow the Cambodian Government.

=== Rogue Warrior ===
Vong Sarendy appears in Richard Marcinko's book, Rogue Warrior, which includes an account of the Cambodian Civil War.

== See also ==
- Cambodian genocide
- Cambodian Civil War
- Cambodian Navy SEALs
- Khmer National Armed Forces
- Khmer National Navy (MNK)
- Vietnam War
