= Ream Naval Base =

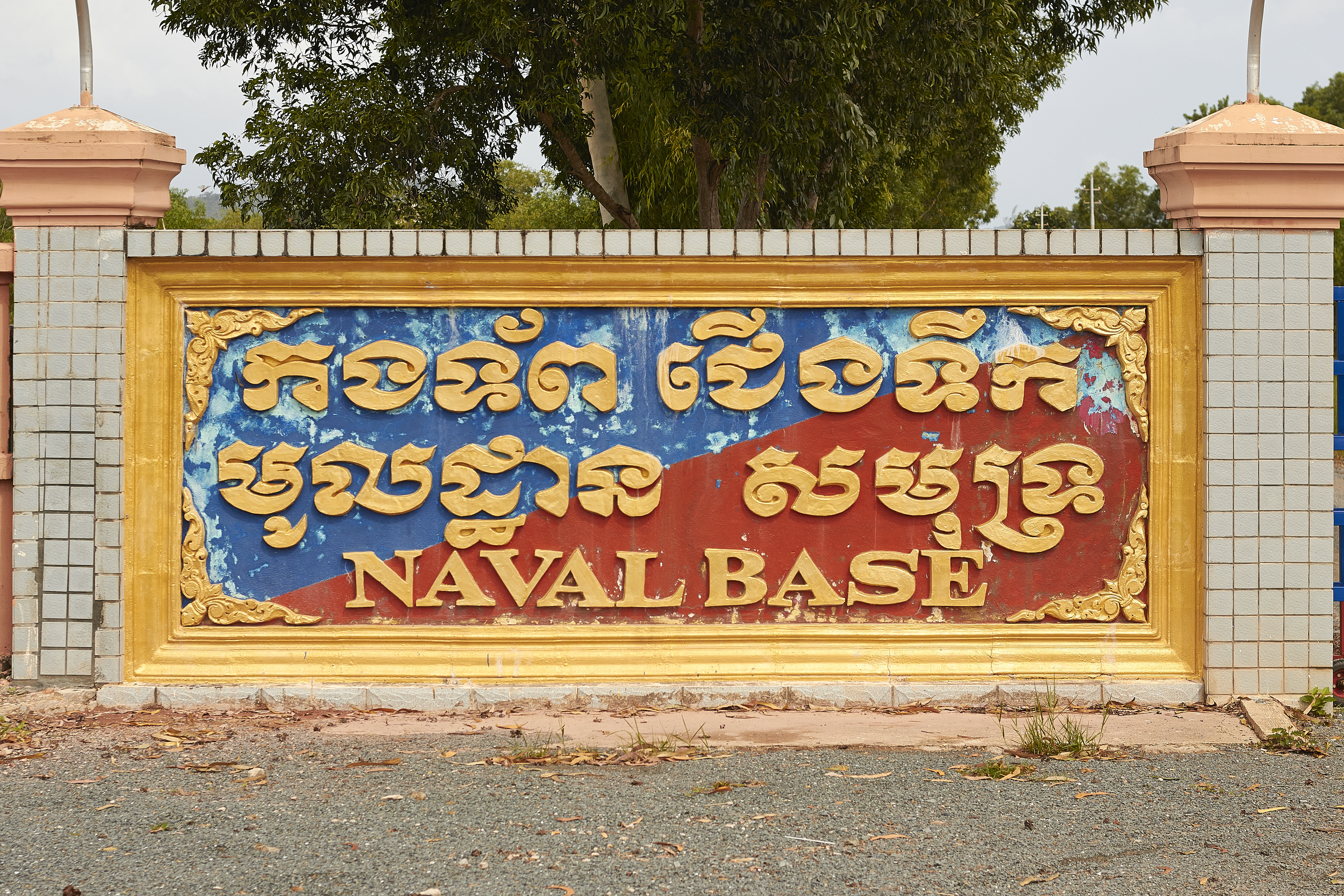
- Interactive map of Ream Naval Base
- Location in Cambodia

Location
- Country: Cambodia
- Coordinates: 10°30′26″N 103°36′43″E

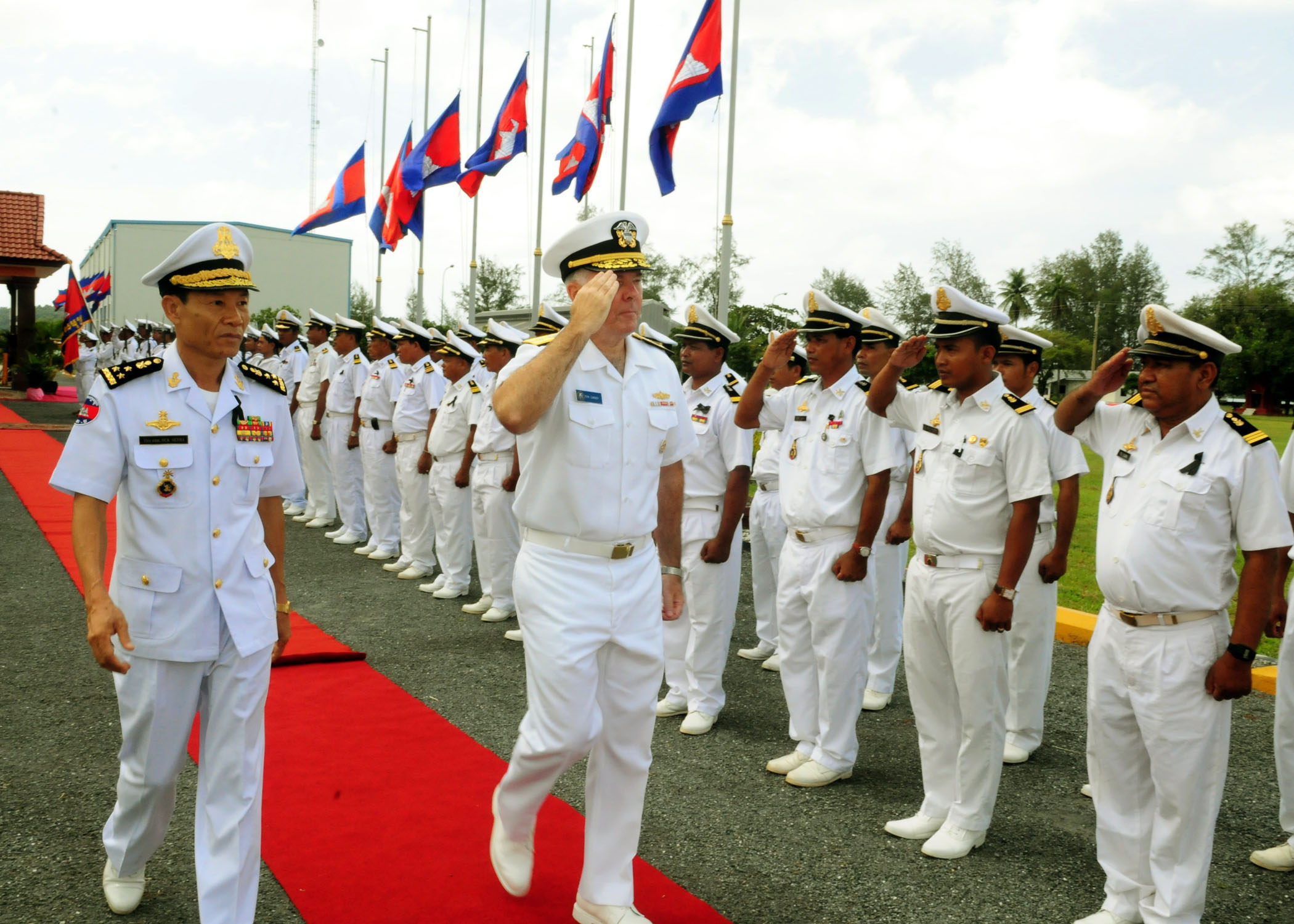
Rear Adm. Tom Carney and Royal Cambodian naval officers at the Ream Navy Base during CARAT 2012

Ream Naval Base is a facility operated by the Royal Cambodian Navy on the coast of the Gulf of Thailand in the province of Sihanoukville, Cambodia. The base, which covers approximately 190 acres, is located on a peninsula just southeast of the provincial capital, Krong Preah Sihanouk. In 2010 the base has been the site of some joint Cambodian-United States training and naval exercises under the Cooperation Afloat Readiness and Training (CARAT) program. In September 2020, one of two US-funded buildings on the base was demolished, and expansions were being constructed by Chinese state-owned enterprises. Western officials fear that they can be used to support a People's Liberation Army Navy presence.

== History ==
With the concentration on ground fighting during the Cambodian Civil War, the government's navy was neglected. At the time of the coup that placed Lon Nol in charge of the government in 1970, the Ream Naval Base was in a very run-down state with one pier in horrible condition, no effective logistical support system and very little internal repair capability. By 1974, Lon Nol's government together with the Khmer National Navy (MNK) and British Royal Navy had vastly improved the base by implementation of a number of actions: procurement of 20 newly constructed radar equipped PCFs (Swift Boats); stationing of four PBRs (River Patrol Boats) in the Kompong Som (Sihanoukville) port area; overhauls of all of the heavy craft in inventory; procurement of a newly overhauled floating drydock the base; substantial upgrade of the Ream Repair Facility equipment; installation of an effective supply support system; and the completion of a modern pier facility and support complex for the base. This newly remodeled and refitted base allowed the Khmer National Navy to effectively assume the patrol and surveillance of the Cambodian coastline which had previously been outsourced to the South Vietnamese Navy (VNN) by the fledgling Khmer Republic. Further plans for an electricity generation plant and procurement of larger, better armed patrol craft were not completed before the fall of the Republic to the Khmer Rouge in 1975.

Since the ouster of the Khmer Rouge in 1979 and the eventual establishment of the current constitutional monarchy, the government in cooperation with its allies has made the facility a relatively modernized naval base currently commanded by Rear Admiral Ouk Seyha, the deputy commander of the Royal Cambodian Navy.

On December 18, 2024, the USS Savannah visited the base. From February 1 to 4, 2025, HMCS Ottawa (FFH 341) visited the base.

In March 2025, Cambodia announced that Ream Naval Base would be reopened after renovation with a Japanese warship expected to be the first to dock at the site. The base formally reopened on 5 April 2025 following a ceremony attended by Prime Minister Hun Manet.

In January 2026, the USS Cincinnati visited the base.

== China-funded expansions ==
In July 2019, US officials stated that they had seen a secret agreement that would allow the People's Liberation Army Navy exclusive access to about one-third of the Ream naval base for up to 30 years. This would give Beijing a new base near the South China Sea.

The existence of the agreement was denied by Cambodian authorities who called it "fake news". They said that the base is Cambodian, not Chinese, and that foreign military presence there is rotational and not permanent, in compliance with the country's constitution. In 2021 the Cambodian defence minister stated that China was helping build infrastructure at Ream and there were no strings attached.

China's potential military presence was condemned by Sam Rainsy, former Leader of the Opposition of Cambodia. In an article for Foreign Affairs, he writes that Chinese armed presence in Cambodia "would pose a grave threat to regional stability" and run afoul of the Cambodian constitution as well as the 1991 Paris Peace Agreements.

In October 2020, Vice-Admiral Vann Bunlieng said that dredging work was being undertaken around the base, in order to accommodate larger vessels, in a project supported by the Chinese government and undertaken by the China Metallurgical Group Corporation. In January 2022, analysts at the Center for Strategic and International Studies (CSIS) under its Asia Maritime Transparency Initiative reported the presence of Chinese clamshell dredgers and construction activities near the base. Chinese funded expansions at the base were completed in April 2025 with the opening of a joint training center attended by Cambodian prime minister Hun Manet, Chinese ambassador Wang Wenbin, and Cao Qingfeng, a deputy chief of staff of the Joint Staff Department of the Central Military Commission. According to CSIS analysts, half of the port facilities appear to be allocated for Cambodian and Chinese use while the other half is used by other countries.

== See also ==
- Ream National Park
