= Khan Chroy Changvar =

Satellite city in Phnom Penh

Chroy Changvar ជ្រោយចង្វារ Chroi Chǎngva
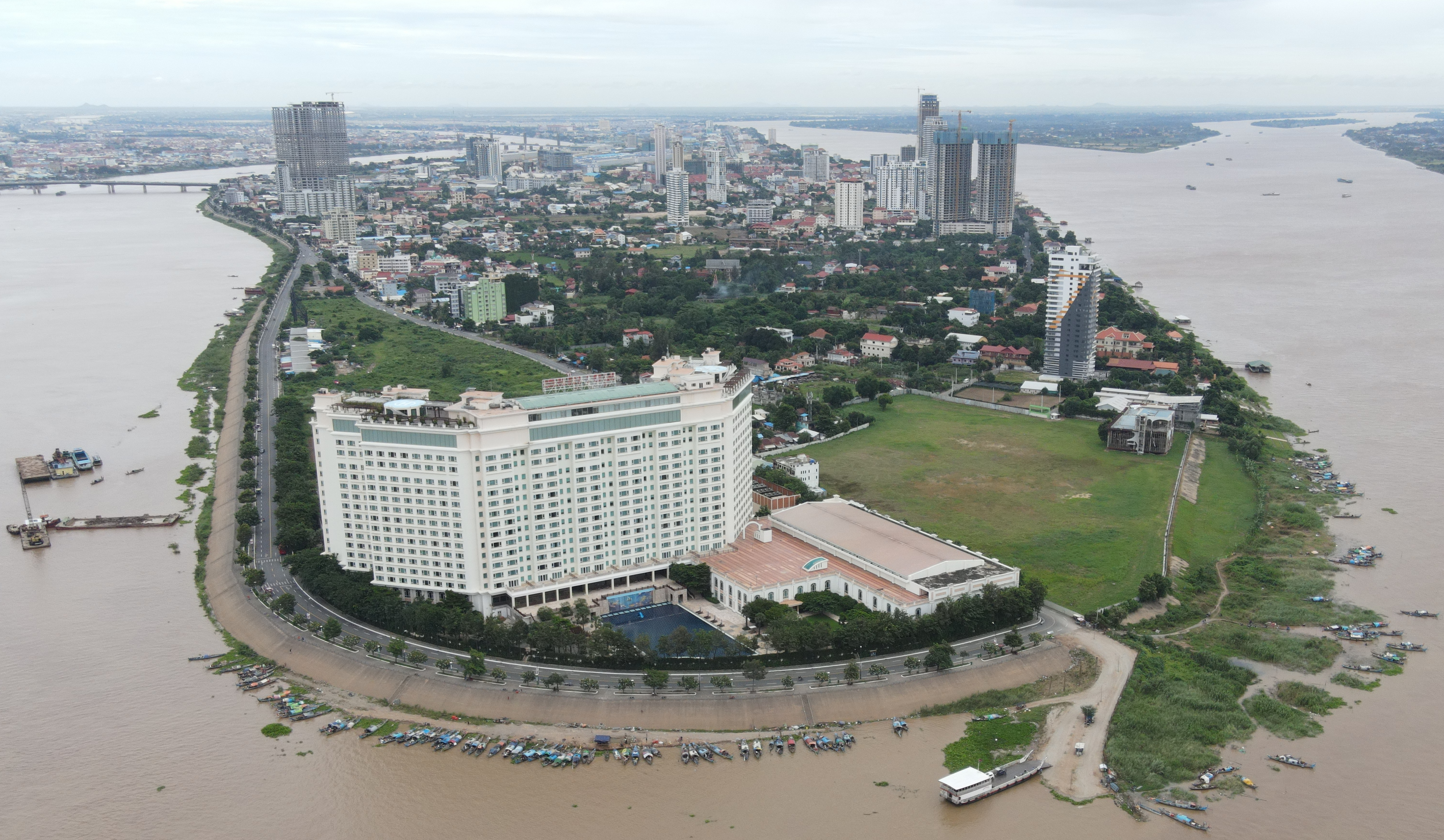
- High-rise buildings in Chroy Changvar district

- Location of Chroy Changvar within Phnom Penh
- Coordinates: 11°32′36.246″N 104°55′26.793″E
- Country: Cambodia
- City: Phnom Penh

Area
  - Total: 85.5 km^{2} (33.0 sq mi)

Population (2019)
  - Total: 159,233
- Time zone: UTC+7 (ICT)

Chroy Changvar (Khmer: ជ្រោយចង្វារ, Chroi Chǎngva; Khmer pronunciation: [croj cɑŋ.ʋaː]) is a district in Phnom Penh, Cambodia.

== Administration ==
Chroy Changvar is subdivided into 5 Sangkats and 22 Phums.

Sangkat (communes)	Phum (villages)
Prek Leap	Kien Khleang, Prek Leap, Bak Khaeng, Khtor
Prek Ta Sek	Prek Ta Roatn, Prek Ta Kong, Prek Reang, Prek Ta Sek, Daeum Kor
Chroy Changvar	Phum I, Phum II, Phum III, Daeum Kor, Kien Khleang
Bak Khaeng	Bak Khaeng Leu, Kdei Chas, Chambak Meas
Koh Dach	Chong Koh, Lvear, Kbal Koh, Koh Dach, Roneah

== Name ==
Chroy Changva is the name of the point at the confluence of the Mekong and Tonle Sap rivers. The word chroy (written jroy in the Khmer script) is fairly straightforward and refers to a piece of land jutting out into the water, while changva (written caṅvā) is of uncertain origin. There are two words that are homophones in Khmer: one, written caṅvā like the place name, refers to the fish known as the bleak, while the other, written cravā, refers to an oar. Both derivations would be consistent with the fact that this district was historically supported by fishing activity. An alternate etymology, proposed by François Martini, would be to derive "changva" from the word jvā, a blanket term for Chams, Malays, and Javanese, with an added nasal infix. This would be consistent with the fact that the Chroy Changva district was historically inhabited primarily by members of these groups. Saveros Pou suggested that similar examples of nasal infixes in Khmer, along with the presence of ethnic-group-derived place names like Kampong Cham, gave the derivation from "jvā" some credibility.

== Developments ==
OCIC is developing a 380-hectare neighbourhood in Chroy Changvar called Chroy Changvar Bay, home to convention centers, universities (including CamTech and RUFA), and key institutions such as the GDT building and Khmer Enterprise.
