= Operation Prek Ta =

- Part of Cambodian Civil War With Vietnam War
Date	Started in 1972
Location	Cambodia,Route 1
Result	inconclusive
Territorial changes	ARVN-FANK forces a tactical and strategic failure

Belligerents
North Vietnam; Vietcong	South Vietnam; Khmer Republic

Commanders and leaders
Trần Văn Trà	Sak Sutsakhan

Strength
Unknown	11 infantry battalions+

Casualties and losses
Unknown	Unknown

Operation Prek Ta was a joint Cambodian-South Vietnamese offensive at the beginning of 1972 against People's Army of Vietnam (PAVN) forces south of Route 1. The result proved inconclusive, and the Khmer National Armed Forces was forced to pull back to Phnom Penh.

== See also ==
- Battle of Kampot
- Cambodian Civil War
- List of weapons of the Cambodian Civil War
- Operation Chenla I
- Operation Chenla II
