= Operation Chenla II =

Part of the Vietnam War (1971)

- Part of Cambodian Civil War and Vietnam War
- Map of the initial phase of the operation
Date	20 August – 3 December 1971
Location	Kampong Thom, Cambodia
Result	PAVN/VC victory; First; FANK Initially recapture Tang Krasang; Second; PAVN/Vietcong-Khmer Rouge victory; 'FANK's 48th Brigade Collapse

Belligerents
North Vietnam; (Provisional Revolutionary Government of the Republic of South Vietnam) Viet Cong; (Cambodia) GRUNK; (Cambodia) Khmer Rouge	Cambodia; 48th Khmer Lake Brigade; (South Vietnam) ARVN

Commanders and leaders
(Vietnam) Col. Trần Văn Trà	(Cambodia) BG. Hou Hang Sin (Cambodia) Gen. Dien Del

Strength
~32,000	~40,000

Casualties and losses
Unknown (Cambodian sources claimed 3,500+ killed during Phase I)	Heavy losses; 10 battalions reportedly destroyed or dispersed
- Total civilian casualties: Hundreds to over 1,000 civilians killed; tens of thousands displaced

Operation Chenla II or Chenla Two was a major military operation conducted by the Khmer National Armed Forces (FANK) during the Cambodian Civil War from 20 August to 3 December 1971.

== Background ==
During the 1960s, under Prince Norodom Sihanouk, the People's Army of Vietnam (PAVN) and the Viet Cong (VC) used base areas in Cambodia to support operations in South Vietnam. After the March 1970 coup led by General Lon Nol, PAVN and VC forces expanded their presence in northeastern Cambodia and advanced closer to Phnom Penh.

At the start of the conflict, FANK was small, poorly trained, and inadequately equipped, particularly in comparison with the more experienced PAVN/VC forces. By mid-1971, however, with substantial assistance from the United States and South Vietnam, FANK had expanded to more than 100,000 personnel.

Between September 1970 and June 1971, FANK achieved a number of early successes, including operations against elements of the PAVN 9th Division along Route 13 and in parts of the Mekong Delta.

In April 1971, Lon Nol decided to resume offensive operations against PAVN/VC forces following the partial success of Operation Chenla I. The principal objective of Chenla II was to reopen Route 6 and secure the road between Kampong Cham and the isolated garrison at Kampong Thom. For the operation, FANK assembled a task force of ten infantry battalions, including a large proportion of Khmer Krom troops, organized into three brigade groups and supported by armour and artillery. The plan also relied heavily on U.S. air support against an estimated two PAVN divisions in the area.

== Operation ==
Operation Chenla II began on 20 August 1971 and initially achieved several of its objectives. The FANK task force, commanded by Brigadier general Hou Hang Sin, retook Barai on 26 August and Kompong Thmar on 1 September. As FANK formations advanced along Route 6 into PAVN/VC-held territory, however, they became vulnerable to attack on their flanks. Heavy fighting followed as the FANK 5th Brigade Group advanced toward Phnom Santuk, while Tang Krasang was retaken on 20 September. On 5 October, three FANK brigades were committed to operations around Phnom Santuk. After further fighting, Phnom Santuk was retaken, and the first phase of Chenla II was officially declared complete on 25 October.

Soon afterward, PAVN and VC forces launched a counteroffensive. On the night of 26 October, shortly after FANK had begun consolidating its gains, the PAVN 9th Division, reinforced by the VC 205th and 207th Regional Regiments, attacked Cambodian positions along Route 6 from the Chamkar Andong rubber plantation. At the same time, the FANK 14th Battalion at Rumlong was surrounded and isolated. In the following days, the 118th, 211th, and 377th Battalions withdrew to Tang Kauk, while the 61st Infantry Brigade fell back to Treal, which was held by the 22nd Battalion.

A FANK counterattack on 27 October was unsuccessful, and after several weeks of fighting the Cambodian corridor along Route 6 collapsed. Elements of the PAVN 9th Division then launched a final assault that broke up several FANK and Khmer Krom battalions, leading Cambodian forces to abandon a number of positions on 1 December. The operation ended two days later.

== Aftermath ==
For the PAVN/VC forces, the battle was a major victory, as it enabled them to retain their positions in northeastern Cambodia. On 8 December 1971, North Vietnamese sources stated that by October the operation had stalled and that 4,500 enemy troops had been killed, with hundreds more captured. They also claimed that the 2nd and 43rd Brigades had suffered heavy losses and that ten battalions, seven infantry companies, and a tank company had been mauled. The official PAVN history states that 10,000 enemy troops were killed or dispersed and that 4,700 weapons were captured.

According to Conboy and Bowra, the final attacks on FANK positions destroyed or dispersed ten infantry battalions, including several Khmer Krom units, and resulted in the loss of equipment equivalent to another ten battalions, including two howitzers, four tanks, five armoured personnel carriers, one scout car, ten jeeps, and about two dozen other vehicles. The defeat significantly weakened FANK both militarily and psychologically. After Chenla II, the Khmer Republic increasingly concentrated on holding major urban centers, principal garrisons, and the lower Mekong-Bassac river corridors, leaving much of the countryside open to Khmer Rouge influence and recruitment.

== See also ==
- Operation Chenla I
- Battle of Kampot
- Cambodian Civil War
- Khmer National Armed Forces
- Khmer Rouge
- List of weapons of the Cambodian Civil War
- Operation Prek Ta

== Bibliography ==
- John S. Bowman, The Vietnam War, Day by Day, Mallard Books, New York 1989. ISBN 0-7924-5087-6
- Sak Sutsakhan, The Khmer Republic at War and the Final Collapse, U.S. Army Center of Military History, Washington D.C. 1980. – available online at Part 1Part 2Part 3 Part 4.
- Royal College Of Defence Studies 1975 Course – The War in Cambodia Its Causes And Military Development And The Political History Of The Khmer Republic 1970 – 1975.
