= Peam Bang =

- Commune and village
- Location within Cambodia
- Coordinates: 12°44′N 104°16′E
- Country: Cambodia
- Province: Kampong Thom
- District: Stoung

Population (1998)
  - Total: 2,218
- Time zone: UTC+7

Peam Bang is a village and commune in Stoung District, Kampong Thom Province, Cambodia. According to the 1998 census of Cambodia it had a total population of 2,218 people, living in 391 households. The Tonle Sap is the most prominent geographical feature; the village lies on its banks. It contains the Boeng Tonle Chhmar reserve. Studies conducted in 2008 revealed that only about 39% of the communal population were educated.
