= Kampong Thom =

Kampong Thom may refer to these places in Cambodia:

- Kampong Thom city
- Kampong Thom province
