= Sambour =

Sambour may refer to the following places in Cambodia:

- Sambour district, including a commune and village of that name, in Kratié province, Cambodia
- Sambour Commune, in Batheay district, Kampong Cham Province, Cambodia
- Sambour Commune, in Prasat Sambour District, Kampong Cham Province, Cambodia
