= Battle of Kampot =

1974 battle of the Cambodian Civil War

- Part of Cambodian Civil War, Vietnam War
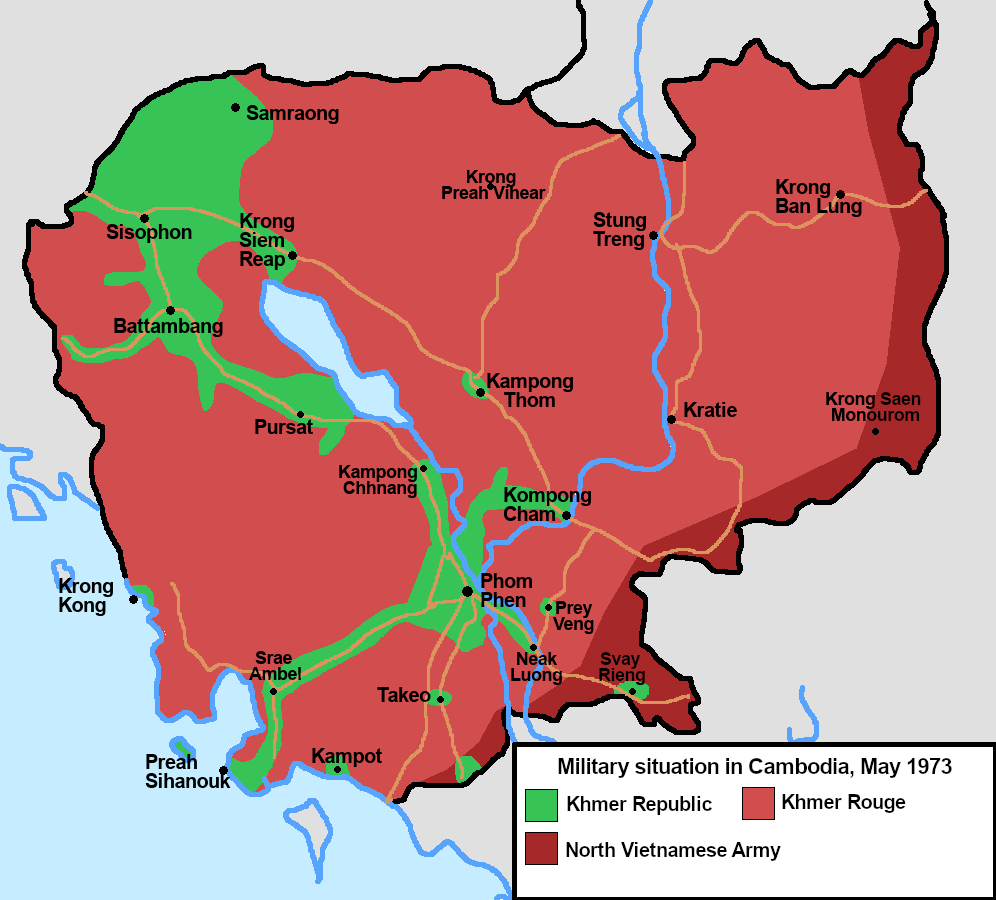
- Map showing the areas under Communist control.
Date	26 February – 30 April 1974
Location	Kampot, Cambodia
Result	Khmer Rouge victory; First;FANK Defense victory; Second;RAK occupied successful city of Kampot
Territorial changes	Khmer Rouge captures Kampot

Belligerents
(Cambodia) Government; (Cambodia) FANK; (Cambodia) ANK; (Cambodia) KAF; (Cambodia) MNK; Supported by: (United States) USN	(Cambodia) GRUNK; (Cambodia) Khmer Rouge; (Cambodia) RAK

Commanders and leaders
(Cambodia) Gen.Mhoul Khleng (Cambodia) Gen.Fan Moung (Cambodia) Col. Ung Nem	(Cambodia) Ta Mok

Strength
(Cambodia) ~4,000–6,000	Unknown

Casualties and losses
391 KIA, 2,275 injured, 79 MIA (Khmer Republic claim)	2,363 KIA (Khmer Republic claim)
- Civilians Killed Total: (~500-1,000+civilians killed,30,000+,forcibly (executed) / †); Soldiers Killed Total: 25 civilians killed and 88 injured (Khmer Republic claim)

The Battle of Kampot was a major military engagement of the Vietnam War, also a part of the Cambodian Civil War, fought between 26 February to 2 April 1974, in which Cambodian Army troops loyal to the Khmer Republic battled Khmer Rouge guerillas for the control of Kampot, the second seaport city of southern Cambodia and capital of Kampot province.

== Battle ==
Enemy pressure on Kampot commenced on 26 February with attacks north of the city. During the first week of March, several territorial companies and units of the 12th Brigade and the 68th Battalion abandoned defensive positions without authority. These actions combined with a dwindling water supply (the enemy had captured the city water works) caused an exodus of over 50% of the civilian inhabitants from the city. Enemy directed l07-mm rockets, l20-mm mortars and other lower caliber attacks against both tactical units/facilities and the civilian populace in Kampot City also added to the rapidly deteriorating situation. The 210th and the 68th Battalions were deactivated after approximately 300 troops deserted during the period 26 February - 2 March 74; the remaining troops were reassigned to the 12th Battalion. Effective support from Navy, Air Force, and artillery units during this critical time provided the FANK high command enough time to reinforce. The 20th and 12th Brigades were deployed to Kampot and directed to attack northeast, parallel to Route 3 to retake the Chakrei Ting Cement Factory (VT2080). Virtually no advance was made by either unit, however; rather, a defense posture developed once enemy strengths and dispositions were fully developed. During the period 2 - 10 March two more Army battalions, some Navy personnel, and six 10S-mm howitzers were deployed to Kampot, and Major General Mhoul Khleng was sent to command all FANK units in Kampot. FANK/USAF aerial resupply operations increased appreciably; four new 10S-mm howitzers were sent to Kampot to replace four older weapons.

Early rain during mid-March somewhat alleviated the water problem (the Navy continued to resupply water regularly); and finally, KAF priorities (airlift and tactical air support) were realigned to help the beleaguered and dwindling enclave. As of 3 April FANK defensive positions near Hill 169 (VS0767S2), which dominates the Kampot Airfield, had been abandoned after the enemy effectively isolated the positions. The 20th and 12th Brigades sustained significant casualties during the month, and by 2 April their effective strengths had been reduced to 664 and 827 respectively. The FANK high command sent Major General Fan Moung, Assistant Chief of the General Staff for Operations, to Kampot on 2 April to assess the situation and immediately after his arrival it was decided to make an all out effort to further reinforce Kampot. F&~ losses in fighting at Kampot during March were lS8 killed, 828 wounded. The enemy suffered 282 killed, 3 captured, and 2S weapons captured.

In Kampot, April opened with FANK forces being pushed deeper into the city, giving up approximately three km on the north and west of the city. By 10 April, the western perimeter had collapsed to within 1.5 kms of the heart of the city. The Naval Infantry had given up the southeast sector, and the enemy had stopped the flow of supplies and reinforcements by sea to Kampot. During the same period, enemy artillery struck the 105-mm howitzer positions ammunition storage area, destroying approximately 3,500 105-mm howitzer rounds and rendering eight 105-mm howitzers inoperable. Two battalions of reinforcements arrived and their immediate deployment in the southeast sector appeared to switch the offensive momentum from the enemy to FANK. After two days of heavy fighting on 8 and 9 April, the 28th Brigade reported 86 enemy killed, while the 20th Brigade in the west claimed another 100 enemy killed. Enemy initiatives diminished as fresh FANK ground forces began to slowly advance and push the enemy away from the city. The garrison military. strength increased from 3,018 on 1 April to 4,006 on 9 April.

The two remaining battalions of the 28th Brigade arrived, along with replacements for losses in other units. By 25 April, the Kampot military strength exceeded 4,561. Enemy mortar attacks diminished in intensity and frequency as advancing government forces reestablished the northern perimeter, pushed the west perimeter out 2.5 km from the city, and on 30 April, reoccupied Kbal Romeas on the east and reopened the river supply route.

== See also ==
- Cambodian Civil War
- Khmer National Armed Forces
- Khmer Rouge
- List of weapons of the Cambodian Civil War
- Operation Chenla I
- Operation Chenla II
- Battle of Oudong
