= Operation Chenla I =

Part of the Vietnam and Cambodian Civil Wars (1970–1971)

- Part of Cambodian Civil War, Vietnam War
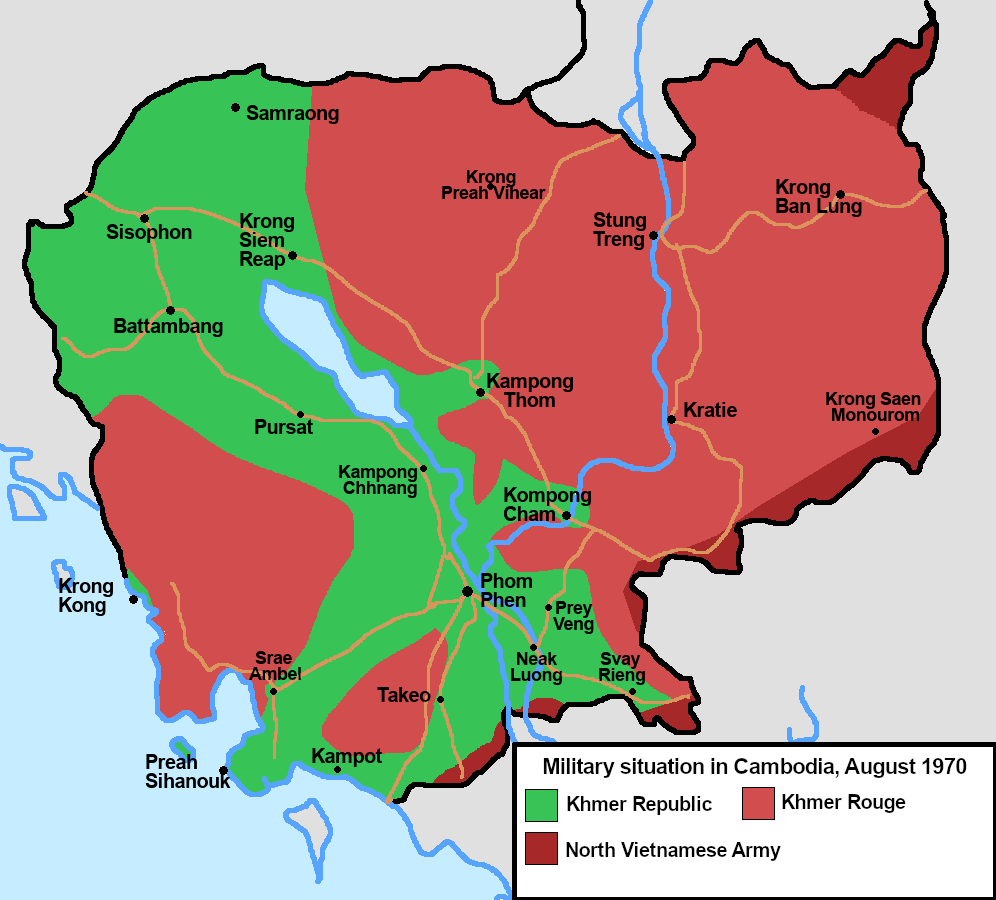
- Map showing the areas under Communist control.
Date	August 1970 – February 1971
Location	Eastern Cambodia
Result	Stalemate: Initially;Cambodia victory, in Withdrawal; FANK limited strategic successful; SOFA Raid Air Force successful Pochentong; PAVN-VC Still in control of East Cambodia

Belligerents
State of Cambodia; Khmer Republic; ARVN	(Provisional Revolutionary Government of the Republic of South Vietnam) Viet Cong; North Vietnam; Supported Politically by: GRUNK

Commanders and leaders
(Cambodia) (Cambodia) Col. Um Savuth	(Vietnam) Col. Trần Văn Trà

Strength
(Cambodia) ~5,000–8,000; (Cambodia) FANK; (Cambodia) ANK; KAF; (Cambodia) MNK; (1ère BM); (3ème BM)	Unknown

Casualties and losses
PAVN/VC claims: (Cambodia) ~100–180 KIA,~250–400 (WIA),200–400 killed	FANK claims: (Vietnam) ~500–900 killed; Unknown.
- Total Casualties: ~900 – 1.550 Killed Casualties (executed) / † (MIA)/ (surrendered)

Operation Chenla I or Chenla One was a major military operation conducted by the Khmer National Armed Forces (FANK) during the Cambodian Civil War. It began in late August 1970 and ended in February 1971, due to the FANK High Command's decision to withdraw some units from Tang Kauk to protect Phnom Penh after Pochentong airbase was attacked.

== Background ==
Following the overthrow of the Cambodian head of state, Prince Norodom Sihanouk, in a coup d'état in March 1970 and its replacement by the pro-US Khmer Republic, the re-christened Khmer National Armed Forces (FANK) focused on expelling all People's Army of Vietnam (PAVN) and Viet Cong (VC) forces from their border sanctuaries in northeastern Cambodia after the new President of the Khmer Republic, Marshal Lon Nol, issued an ultimatum. However, from May 1970, the ill-prepared FANK was quickly placed at a strategic disadvantage following the seizure of the northeastern areas of the country (the provinces of Stung Treng, Ratanakiri, Kratie, and Mondulkiri) by the PAVN in response to the ultimatum and the loss to the Khmer Rouge insurgents of several peripheral eastern and southwestern Cambodian provinces (Kampot, Koh Kong, Kampong Cham, Preah Vihear, plus portions of Siem Reap, Oddar Meanchey, Kampong Thom, Prey Veng, and Svay Rieng Provinces) during that same year.

The FANK High Command made the decision in July 1970 to retake sizable tracts of prosperous rice-growing territory in northeastern Cambodia that were not under the control of the Khmer Rouge in order to regain strategic initiative and boost the morale of the FANK troops during a lull in PAVN/VC activity. Lon Nol made preparations for an offensive plan codenamed 'Chenla' to be launched in late August of that same year. An ANK task-force consisting of a dozen infantry battalions – which included several 'repatriated' Khmer Krom volunteer battalions recruited in South Vietnam – supported by armour and artillery was assembled for the operation, which relied on limited ground and air support from the Army of the Republic of Vietnam (ARVN) and the Republic of Vietnam Air Force (RVNAF).

== Operation ==
Initially, Operation Chenla I went on as planned. The offensive began in late August, when the FANK task-force under the command of Brigadier general Um Savuth converged on Route 6 and its objectives were two-fold: firstly, sweep away PAVN and VC forces along the road and recapture the rice paddies around Kampong Cham. Secondly, clear Route 7, which was repeatedly attacked by Khmer Rouge forces, in order to reconnect Skoun and Kampong Thom. The FANK task-force succeeded in catching the PAVN/VC by surprise, retaking Tang Kauk during early September with ease and opened 15 miles of Route 6 for a short time and the Cambodian troops then helped resettle refugees and raised local self-defense forces.

In response to this offensive, the PAVN/VC forces mounted a series of counter-attacks along Route 7, intended to block the advance of the FANK units; the areas around Kompong Cham and Prey Totung saw significant fighting during the closing months of 1970. As a result of the pressure exerted by the PAVN's 9th Division, the FANK couldn't advance further beyond Tang Kauk. Army of the Republic of Vietnam (ARVN) units then linked with the Cambodian task-force east of the Mekong River in December, allowing the FANK to reopen Route 7 without making contact with enemy troops.

However, on the night of 21–22 January 1971, a hundred or so-strong PAVN 'Commando' force (Vietnamese: Đắc Cộng or 'Sappers') managed to pass undetected through the defensive perimeter of the Special Military Region (French: Region Militaire Spéciale – RMS) set by the FANK around Phnom Penh and carried out a spectacular raid on Pochentong airbase, virtually destroying the then Khmer Air Force (AAK) on the ground. The surrounding areas around the airbase were also targeted. President Lon Nol extended the 'State of Emergency' for another six months as some FANK units fighting at Tang Kauk were recalled and redeployed to protect Phnom Penh, effectively bringing Chenla I to an end.

== Aftermath ==
Despite early gains, the FANK only achieved a limited strategic success, with the cost of sacrificing some of the more experienced Khmer Krom battalions; the PAVN and VC still controlled a large portion of territory east of Phnom Penh. Lon Nol was evacuated by U.S. aircraft for treatment at the Tripler General Hospital in Hawaii after suffering a severe stroke.

== See also ==
- Battle of Kampot
- Cambodian Civil War
- Khmer National Armed Forces
- Khmer Rouge
- List of weapons of the Cambodian Civil War
- Operation Chenla II
- Operation Prek Ta
- Republic of Vietnam Air Force

== Bibliography ==
- Frédéric Serra, L’armée nord-vietnamienne, 1954–1975 (2e partie), in Armes Militaria Magazine n.º 322, May 2012. ISSN 0753-1877 (in French)
- Kenneth Conboy, Kenneth Bowra, and Simon McCouaig, The NVA and Viet Cong, Elite series 38, Osprey Publishing Ltd, Oxford 1992. ISBN 9781855321625
- Sak Sutsakhan, The Khmer Republic at War and the Final Collapse, U.S. Army Center of Military History, Washington D.C. 1980. – available online at Part 1Part 2Part 3 Part 4.
