= Um Savuth =

Cambodian military officer

- Died: November 1972
- Military career
- Allegiance: First Kingdom of Cambodia; Khmer Republic
- Branch: Royal Cambodian Army; Khmer National Army
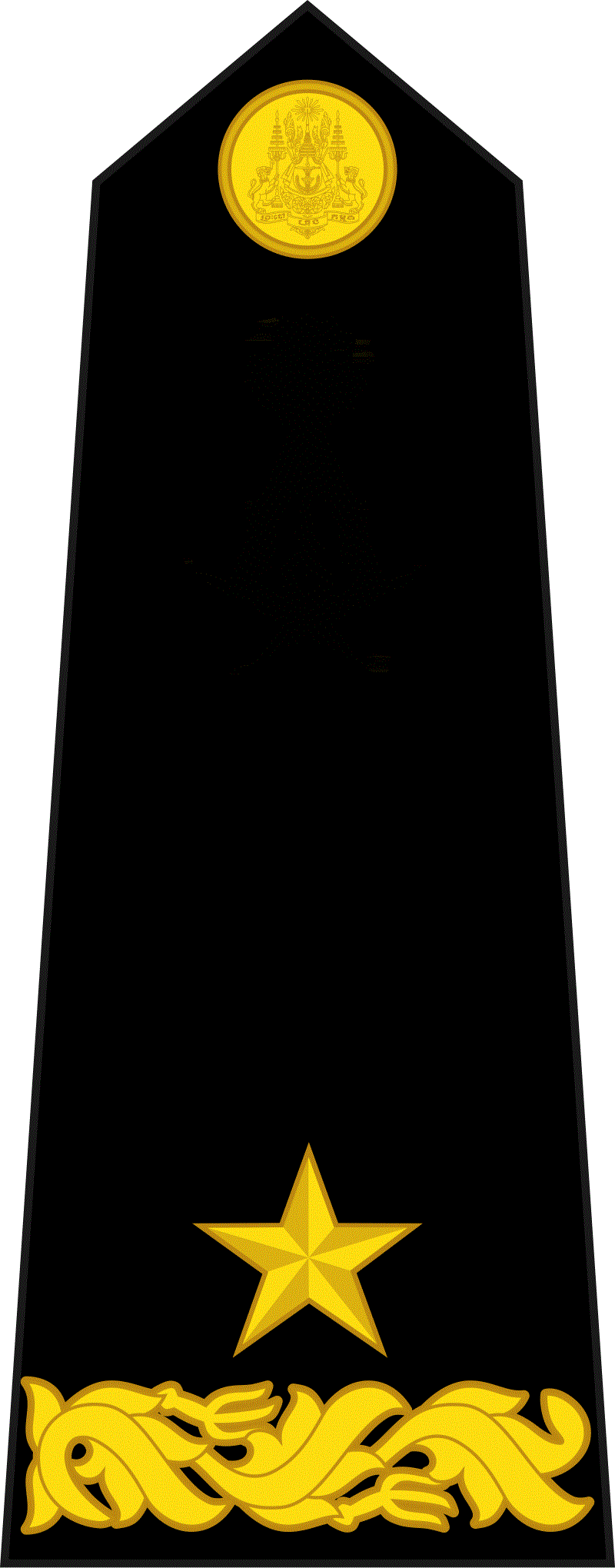
- Rank: Brigadier general
- Commands: Military Region 5 commander
- Conflicts: Cambodian Civil War; Operation Chenla I

Um Savuth (? – November 1972) was a Cambodian army officer who came to his greatest prominence during the Cambodian Civil War, where he was responsible for commanding the Khmer National Armed Forces during their disastrous 1971 offensive, Operation Chenla I.

== Early life ==
The son of a government chauffeur, and the younger brother of politician Um Samuth, Savuth began his career in the Royal Cambodian Army under the regime of Prince Norodom Sihanouk, and became a supporter of General Lon Nol after the latter's 1970 coup against Sihanouk.

Savuth was largely paralyzed down one side of his body, walked with the aid of a cane, and was, reputedly, continually drunk to numb the pain of his condition. This had come about due to an incident earlier in his career in which he had drunkenly insisted that a subordinate shoot a live cat off his head, stating that it was a direct order when the soldier resisted. The shot missed, and part of Savuth's head was blown away: nevertheless, he continued his military career.

== Career ==
Under Sihanouk's regime, Savuth (along with a fellow officer, Les Kosem) was closely involved in the formation of FULRO, a guerrilla resistance movement seeking autonomy for the Degar tribes of Vietnam. When Kosem disagreed with the direction being taken by FULRO's leader, Y-Bham Enuol, he forcibly detained him and placed him under house arrest at Savuth's residence in Phnom Penh. Like Kosem, Savuth was also known to be deeply implicated in Sihanouk's secret arrangement with North Vietnam by which weapons were smuggled through Cambodia (along the "Sihanouk Trail") to the Viet Cong.

Subsequent to the Khmer Republic's declaration, Savuth rose to the rank of Brigadier general. Despite assurances, from the Republic's US backers, that Savuth was "better drunk than most Cambodian officers sober", his most prominent campaign, Operation Chenla I, was a military disaster.

In 1971, Savuth wrote to US President Richard Nixon, offering him his pet elephant "Khaat" ("Little Frog") as a gift. Nixon did not respond to the offer, though Savuth's wife told Peter R. Kann of the Wall Street Journal that she was rather pleased with this as "giving away an elephant is bad luck".

== Death ==
Savuth was killed in a car accident in November 1972, though Khmer Rouge radio claimed that he had died during an attack by CPNLAF troops along National Route 5. A newsreel of his subsequent cremation (in accordance with traditional Buddhist practices) is still held by the Documentation Center of Cambodia.
