= Boeng Tonle Chhmar =

Protected area in Cambodia

- IUCN category IV (habitat/species management area)
- Location within Cambodia
- Location: Kampong Thom Province, Cambodia
- Nearest city: Pursat
- Coordinates: 12°49′8″N 104°16′35″E
- Area: 145.6 km^{2} (56.2 sq mi)
- Established: January 1999
- Governing body: Cambodian Ministry of Environment

Ramsar Wetland
- Official name: Boeng Chhmar and Associated River System and Floodplain
- Designated: June 23, 1999
- Reference no.: 997

Boeng Tonle Chhmar is a 145.6 km^{2} (56.2 sq mi) large multiple use management area in Cambodia bordering Tonlé Sap lake that was established in 1999. It is located in Peam Bang Commune in Kampong Thom Province.

Boeng Tonle Chhmar is a state owned sanctuary. The wildlife sanctuary consists of a lake surrounded by flooded forest on the north eastern side of the Tonle Sap lake. It contains areas of permanent open water, a system of small waterways and areas of flooded forest. In the wet season, Boeng Tonle Chhmar ceases to be a discrete lake and becomes part of the much enlarged Tonle Sap. The sanctuary is an example of near natural South Asian wetland. The area plays an important role in the hydrology and biology of two major river systems, the Stoung river and the Chikreng river. This area is home to a large number of diverse plant, fish, mammal and waterbird species. Many of these are listed as rare, vulnerable, or globally endangered. The Tonle Sap lake and its surrounding biosphere play a vital role in the Cambodian economy and several million depend on fish from the lake as a source of protein. Boeng Tonle Chhmar is one of three Ramsar Convention sites in Cambodia with the site number 997.

== Location and access ==
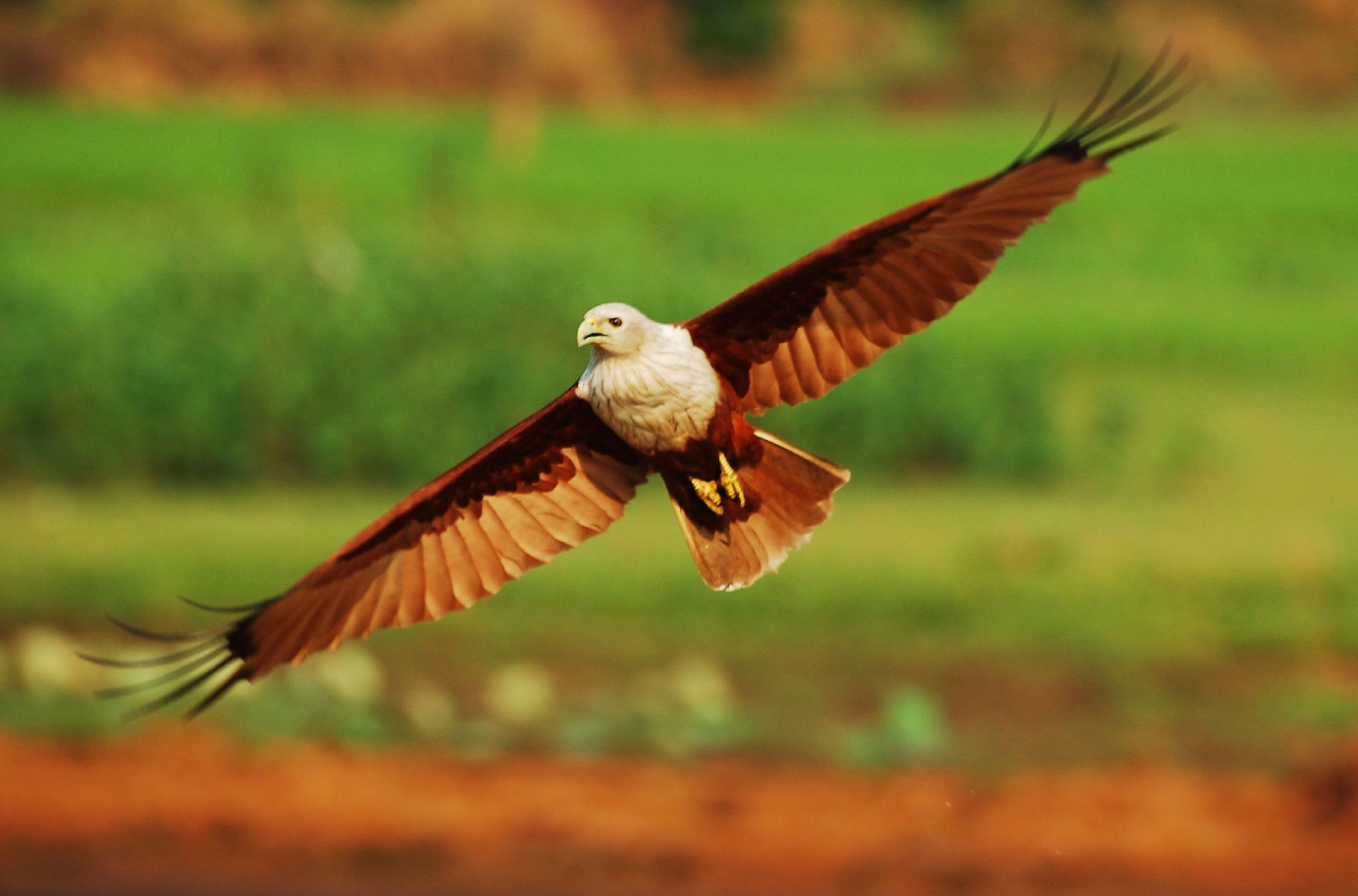
A brahminy kite in flight

Boeng Tonle Chhmar and the connected creek system are located on the flood plain of the Tonle Sap. This flood plain in turn is part of the Mekong River Basin. The Boeng Chhmar area is close to the center of the lake and located on the northern shore. To the south and the west, Boeng Chhmar joins the Tonle Sap lakeshore. While to the north and the east the protected area joins with areas of floodplain forest. The protected area lies within the administrative boundaries of Peam Bang commune, Stoung District, Kampong Thom Province. The commune contains five floating villages - Pov Veuy, Pechakrei, Peam Bang, Ba Lat and Doun Sdaeng which all lie in the vicinity of the protected area.

== Birds ==
Beong Chhmar is home to important colonies of numerous globally or regionally threatened bird species including the brahminy kite (Haliastur indus), painted stork (Mycteria leucocephala), black-necked stork (Ephippiorhynchus asiaticus), lesser adjutant (Leptoptilos javanicus), greater adjutant (Leptoptilos dubius), spot-billed pelican (Pelecanus philippensis), Indian cormorant (Phalacrocorax fuscicollis) and the Oriental darter (Anhinga melanogaster).
