= Khmer Special Forces =

Khmer Special Forces Forces Speciales Khmères
- Active: October 1971 – 17 April 1975
- Country: Khmer Republic
- Allegiance: Khmer Republic
- Branch: Khmer National Army
- Type: Special forces
- Size: 350 men (at height)
- Part of: Khmer National Armed Forces
- Headquarters: Phnom Penh
- Nickname: Khmer SF (FSK in French)
- Engagements: Battle of Kampong Cham; Siege of Kampong Seila; Fall of Phnom Penh

Commanders
- Notable commanders: Brigadier general Thach Reng; Colonel Kim Phong; Captain Sok Thach; Captain Thach Saren

The Khmer Special Forces, also designated 'Khmer SF' for short or Forces Speciales Khmères (FSK) in French, were the special forces of the Khmer National Army (ANK), the land component of the Khmer National Armed Forces (commonly known by their French acronym, FANK) during the 1970-75 Cambodian Civil War.

== Origins ==
The history of the Khmer Special Forces began in October 1971, when the 1st Special Forces Group (Airborne) was organized at Phnom Penh under the command of Lieutenant colonel (later, Brigadier general) Thach Reng. The Khmer SF were actually a creation of Lt. Col. Ronnie Mendoza, a Special Forces-qualified United States Army officer assigned to the American Military Equipment Delivery Team, Cambodia (MEDTC) assistance program earlier in June 1971. A prominent member of the MEDTC's Plans and Programs Section, Lt. Col. Mendoza focused on providing the Khmer National Army (ANK) unconventional warfare units capable of carrying out counterinsurgency and guerrilla warfare operations in the northern and eastern Cambodian provinces under the control of both the North Vietnamese Army (NVA) and their Khmer Rouge allies. Two other SF groups, the 2nd Special Forces Group (Airborne) and the 3rd Special Forces Group (Airborne) were activated in the following year.

Under the auspices of Operation "Freedom Runner" – a Khmer National Armed Forces (FANK) training program set up in November 1971 by the United States Army Special Forces (USSF) –, Khmer Special Forces teams began to be sent to South Vietnam to attend Parachute courses at the Republic of Vietnam Airborne Division (VNAD) Training Centre in Long Thành, and the Special Forces' (SF) course at the Army of the Republic of Vietnam Special Forces (LLDB) Dong Ba Thin Training Centre near Cam Ranh Bay. Manned by the USSF Detachment B-51, assisted by New Zealand Army instructors from the 2nd NZ Army Training Team Vietnam (2 NZATTV) and modelled on the USSF/LLDB own training programs, the course began with four weeks of basic SF skills followed by training in one of six SF job skills: operations and intelligence, demolitions, light weapons, heavy weapons, radio communications, or medical. Other advanced additional courses included psychological warfare, political warfare, anti-tank warfare, and Taekwondo. A two-week 'live-fire' field exercise (sometimes complemented by a field operation against NVA/Vietcong (VC) forces in the surrounding areas of the training centre) completed the SF course.

More specialised SF training was carried out in the United States and Thailand since December 1972. Khmer SF trainees attended technical courses at Fort Bragg, North Carolina, by the USSF 5th Special Forces Group and at the Royal Thai Army (RTA) Special Warfare Centre at Fort Narai, Lopburi Province by the US 46th Special Forces Company; additional commando and guerrilla skills were taught by Thai instructors from the Royal Thai Army Special Warfare Command (RTASWC) and Royal Thai Police (RTP) Police Aerial Reinforcement Unit (PARU) at the latter's Phitsanulok and Hua Hin training camps. Advanced Thahan Phran (Thai Rangers)/Long-range reconnaissance patrol (LRRP) and radio communications' courses also took place in early 1973 at the Military Assistance Command, Vietnam (MACV) Recondo School at Nha Trang, South Vietnam, manned by the USSF Detachment B-36, and at the RTA Recondo School co-located at Ft. Narai, Thailand, before "Freedom Runner" was concluded on July that year.

== Structure and organization ==
The Khmer Special Forces were closely modelled after the United States Army Special Forces and the defunct South Vietnamese Army of the Republic of Vietnam Special Forces, with a total unit strength of 350 officers and enlisted men, being organized in July 1973 into one separate Headquarter 'C' Detachment, along with three 'B' Detachments and 18 'A' Detachments in turn organized into three Special Forces Groups (SFGs). Unlike an American A-Team however, Khmer SF 'A' Detachments could field up to 15 men, the additional personnel being psychological warfare specialists. They were structured as follows:

- The 33-man 'C' Detachment, personally commanded by Brig. Gen. Thach Reng, which comprised three 25-man HQ 'B' Detachments sub-divided into five 15-man 'A' Detachments, was allocated at the Cambodian capital and served as Headquarters for the Khmer Special Forces Command.
- The 1st Special Forces Group, led by Major (later, Colonel) Kim Phong was composed of one 25-man 'B' Detachment and six 15-man 'A' Detachments (A-111, A-112, A-113, A-114, A-115, A-116) deployed in Battambang province.
- The 2nd Special Forces Group, led by Captain Sok Thach comprising the B-12 Detachment and six 'A' Detachments (A-121, A-122, A-123, A-124, A-125, A-126) was stationed in Phnom Penh.
- The 3rd Special Forces Group, led by Captain Thach Saren was composed of the B-13 Detachment and six 'A' Detachments (A-131, A-132, A-133, A-134, A-135, A-136). The 3rd SFG was given responsibility for operations around the capital, along the lower Mekong-Bassac River corridors, and the coastline.

=== Composition ===
Khmer Special Forces members' were all airborne-qualified volunteers, though most of the initial cadre was actually formed by "repatriated" ethnic Khmer recruits from the Khmer Krom minority living in South Vietnam. Traditionally aggressive, the Khmer Krom brought with them years of combat experience gained while fighting in the irregular counterinsurgency MIKE Force and Civilian Irregular Defense Group program (CIDG) units in South Vietnam under the control of the USSF and the Military Assistance Command, Vietnam – Studies and Observations Group (MACV-SOG). The programme began in May 1970 when the Americans assembled a first batch of 2,000 Khmer Krom veteran soldiers and airlifted them to Cambodia. Consequently, by February 1972 both the 1st SFG (raised in Cambodia) and 2nd SFG (formed and trained in Thailand) had a large percentage of Khmer Krom repatriates, but gradually native Cambodian recruits began to supplant them over time. Unlike the previous two groups, 3rd SFG, brought to strength in December 1972 and also sent to Thailand for training, had few experienced Khmer Krom members. In fact, one of its A-detachments was filled entirely by Khmer Loeu highlanders from northeastern Cambodia.

== Khmer Special Forces' missions ==
The missions performed by the Khmer Special Forces during the war were many and varied, ranging from long-range strategic and tactical reconnaissance to deep-penetration raids, pathfinding, and reinforcement duties. In a true special forces' unconventional training role, they also raised paramilitary self-defense village militias in rural areas situated behind enemy lines, as well as training airfield security battalions for the Khmer Air Force (KAF) at the Ream infantry training centre. In addition, the Khmer Special Forces provided LRRP instructors for the FANK Recondo School at Battambang which first opened in November 1972.

=== Combat operations 1971–1974 ===
Besides unconventional warfare and training operations, the Khmer Special Forces were also engaged on some notable combat operations in support of FANK regular troops. The first true combat assignment of the Khmer Special Forces occurred in May 1972, when they participated in a search and destroy operation alongside Army units around Phnom Penh to clear its northern outskirts of Khmer Rouge and NVA light artillery teams, who were harassing the quarters of the Cambodian capital with 122mm rocket and 75mm recoilless rifle fire.

In September 1973, the Khmer Special Forces spearheaded the combined Khmer National Army-Khmer National Navy (MNK) amphibious warfare operation "Castor 21" to retake the provincial capital of Kampong Cham, which had been stormed by Khmer Rouge forces in August. Just prior to the assault, two 'A' Detachments were inserted by helicopter into the insurgent-held southern quarter of the city and used M72 LAW rockets to neutralize an enemy stronghold. The role of the Khmer Special Forces teams at the Battle of Kampong Cham was not limited to combat assignments though; their radio operators also assisted coordinating the Khmer Air Force (AAK) in carrying out successfully aerial resupply drops on behalf of FANK ground units defending the retaken city.

This coordinating role was again resumed on June–July 1974 during the siege of the district capital of Kampong Seila in Koh Kong Province, located some 135 Kilometers (84 Miles) south-west of Phnom Penh, down Route 4. At the time, this small town and its beleaguered Government garrison were enduring a record eight-month-long siege by Khmer Rouge forces, with the local civilian population already suffering from starvation. Deviating from the Cambodian Army's standard communications procedures, the garrison made desperate radio appeals to Phnom Penh for relief, a fact that arouse suspicions in the FANK High Command. Fearing that Government relief forces were being lured into a trap, it was decided to send first observers to assess the situation at Kampong Seila and to verify the loyalty of the garrison. After two unsuccessful attempts, a Khmer Special Forces team was heli-lifted into the town and after confirming the reports, aerial ressuply operations were sanctioned to alleviate the starvation and allow the Army garrison to hold out against further insurgent pressure.

=== The final days 1974–1975 ===
By March 1975 with all land and river routes leading to Phnom Penh cut, the Khmer Rouge began their final assault on the Cambodian capital. Aside from three 'A' Detachments operating in Battambang and two in Siem Reap, the bulk of the Khmer Special Forces under Brig. Gen. Thach Reng were withdrawn to Phnom Penh to assist in its defense. Two teams secured the Phnom Penh Olympic Stadium, where seven KAF UH-1H transport helicopters were being kept to evacuate key members of the government. On the morning of April 17, 1975, after supervising the heliborne evacuation of only a handful of top officials and their families from the improvised helipad at the Olympic Stadium (three of the helicopters had to be abandoned due to technical malfunctions), Brig. Gen. Reng handed over the command of the Khmer SF to Colonel Kim Phong and boarded the last helicopter to abandon the Stadium. Left to fend for themselves, Col. Phong and his subordinates planned a massive breakout by land to the south-east towards the South Vietnamese border. Although the Khmer Special Forces escape force managed to sneak out across the southern suburbs of the capital, they never reached the border and were all presumed killed in action.

The remaining Khmer Special Forces teams defending the last government-held holdouts at Battambang, including the teaching staff of the Recondo School, and Siem Reap reportedly tried to escape in small groups to Thailand by treeking across hostile territory. Only a handful of Special Forces personnel managed to evade enemy patrols and reach the Thai-Cambodian border; the rest was either killed in action or captured and sent to the Khmer Rouge-run labour camps (also known as the “Killing Fields”), where they died after enduring the terrible working and living conditions during the late 1970s.

== Controversy ==
A highly capable and well-trained force, unfortunately the Khmer Special Forces remained too small to have a strategic impact in the war. Casualties and manpower shortages affected their tactical deployment which rarely matched the proposed organization, with many 'A' Detachments actually falling below strength. Khmer Special Forces personnel often found themselves being employed in unsuitable tasks to which they had not been trained – in reality, many FANK regional commanders misused them as conventional shock troops on many occasions, such as the sieges and subsequent battles of Kampong Cham and Kampong Seila in 1973–74. Furthermore, a large portion of 2nd Special Forces Group's personnel were siphoned off to protect Phnom Penh from the threat of internal coups d'état, while two more 'A' Detachments from the 3rd SFG were assigned security duties as a VIP protection squad for President Lon Nol when he visited his villa on the coastal city of Kampong Som.

== Khmer Special Forces’ Command ==
=== Para-Commando Battalion ===
The Khmer Special Forces Command was augmented in late 1974 when they assumed operational control over the newly formed Para-Commando Battalion (Bataillon de Commandos Parachutistes – BCP in French). In March 1975, loosely under assignment to the Khmer SF, the Para-Commandos were sent to man the defensive perimeter north-west of Phnom Penh.

== Weapons and equipment ==
The Khmer Special Forces used the standard weaponry and equipment of US origin issued to FANK units, complemented by captured Soviet or Chinese small-arms such as AK-47 assault rifles that allowed SF personnel to use ammunition retrieved from enemy caches while on operations.

- Belgium FN GP35 Pistols
- United States Colt.45 M1911 Pistols
- United States Smith & Wesson Model 39 Revolvers
- Soviet Union TT-33 Pistols
- China Type 56 Assault rifle
- China Type 56-1 Assault rifle
- Soviet Union AKM Assault rifle
- United States M16A1 Assault rifle
- United States CAR-15 Assault carbine
- United States Ithaca Model 37 pump-action shotguns
- Soviet Union RPD Light machine gun
- China Type 56 Light machine gun
- United States M60 General purpose machine gun
- Soviet Union RPG-2 Rocket-propelled grenade
- Soviet Union RPG-7 Rocket-propelled grenade
- United States M72 LAW Anti-tank rocket launcher
- United States M79 grenade launcher
- United States M203 grenade launcher
- United States M29 mortar
- United States M18 Claymore anti-personnel mines

== See also ==
- Army of the Republic of Vietnam Special Forces (LLDB)
- Cambodian Navy SEALs
- SPECOM (Laos)
