= Prasat Balangk District =

Prasat Balangk ស្រុកប្រាសាទបល្ល័ង្ក
- District (srok)
- Interactive map of Prasat Balangk
- Country: Cambodia
- Province: Kampong Thom
- Time zone: +7
- Geocode: 0604

Prasat Balangk is a district within Kampong Thom Province, in central Cambodia. According to the 1998 census of Cambodia, it had a population of 40,516.

== Administration ==
The following table shows the villages of Prasat Balangk by commune.

Khum (Communes)	Phum (Villages)
Doung	Doung, Kokor, Kruor, Ta Mom, Krabau, Kruos, Dang Phdiek, Dang Ta Aek
Kraya	Sangvat, Kraya Cheung, Kraya Tboung, Baray, Anlong Chuor, Bos Thum
Phan Nheum	Trapeang Knong, Srama, Phdiek, Prey Mari, Kranhung, Prohut, Smaonh, Sochol
Sakream	Sakream Cheung, Veal Thnal, Ou Khsang, Prich, Srae Veal, Ou Angkor, Trapeang Pring, Kanteak, Veal Chas, Peam Atit, Sakream Tboung
Sala Visai	Trapeang Kraol, Bos Veaeng, Ruessei Douch, Srae, Chamnar, Ou Krouch, Sala Visai, Andas, Trapeang Phdiek, Trapeang Thma, Bos Sramaoch, Veal Lpeak, Khmak, Talaek, Dang Anteak, Chey, Kokir, Kvan Tieng, Sala Popel
Sameakki	Thmei, Trach, Kampeut, Chan Serei, Samraong
Tuol Kreul	Chonlus, Mreak Ka, Mreak Kha, Krapeu, Tuol Kreul, Thum, Thnal
