= Cambodian Para-Commando Battalion =

Cambodian Para-Commando Battalion Bataillon de Commandos Parachutistes
- Active: March 1972 – March 1975
- Country: Cambodia
- Allegiance: Khmer Republic
- Branch: Cambodian Army
- Type: Commando
- Size: 400-500 (at height)
- Part of: Khmer National Armed Forces
- Headquarters: Pochentong Airborne Base, Phnom Penh
- Nickname: BCP (PCB in English)
- Engagements: Fall of Phnom Penh

Commanders
- Notable commanders: (unknown)

The Cambodian Para-Commando Battalion (French: Bataillon de Commandos Parachutistes – BCP) was one of the main elite military units of the Cambodian Army (French: Armée Nationale Khmère – ANK), part of the Khmer National Armed Forces (French: Forces Armées Nationales Khmères – FANK), which fought in the final phase of the Cambodian Civil War of 1970-75.

== Origins ==
The BCP had its origins in a 60-man contingent sent by the ANK Command in March 1972 to Indonesia to attend the Para-Commando course at the Batujajar Airborne Commando School, near Bandung in West Java. A significant number of the contingent was made of recruits drawn from the Muslim Cham ethnic minority of Cambodia. After a nine-month course conducted by Indonesian Kopassandha instructors, the contingent returned to Phnom Penh in November 1972. Upon their return, however, two dozen of its members were posted to the ANK's 5th Infantry Brigade, a predominantly Muslim formation; the remaining 36 Cham graduates were assigned to a ceremonial unit allocated in the Cambodian Capital until 1974.

== Operations ==
They were then used as the cadre for the BCP and in March 1975, loosely under assignment to the Khmer Special Forces, the Para-Commandos were sent to man the defensive perimeter north-west of Phnom Penh.

== See also ==
- Cambodian Navy SEALs
- Khmer Special Forces
- Khmer National Armed Forces
- Khmer National Army
- List of weapons of the Cambodian Civil War
