= Steung Saen Municipality =

Stueng Saen ស្ទឹងសែន
- Municipality
- Stueng Saen Municipality ក្រុងស្ទឹងសែន
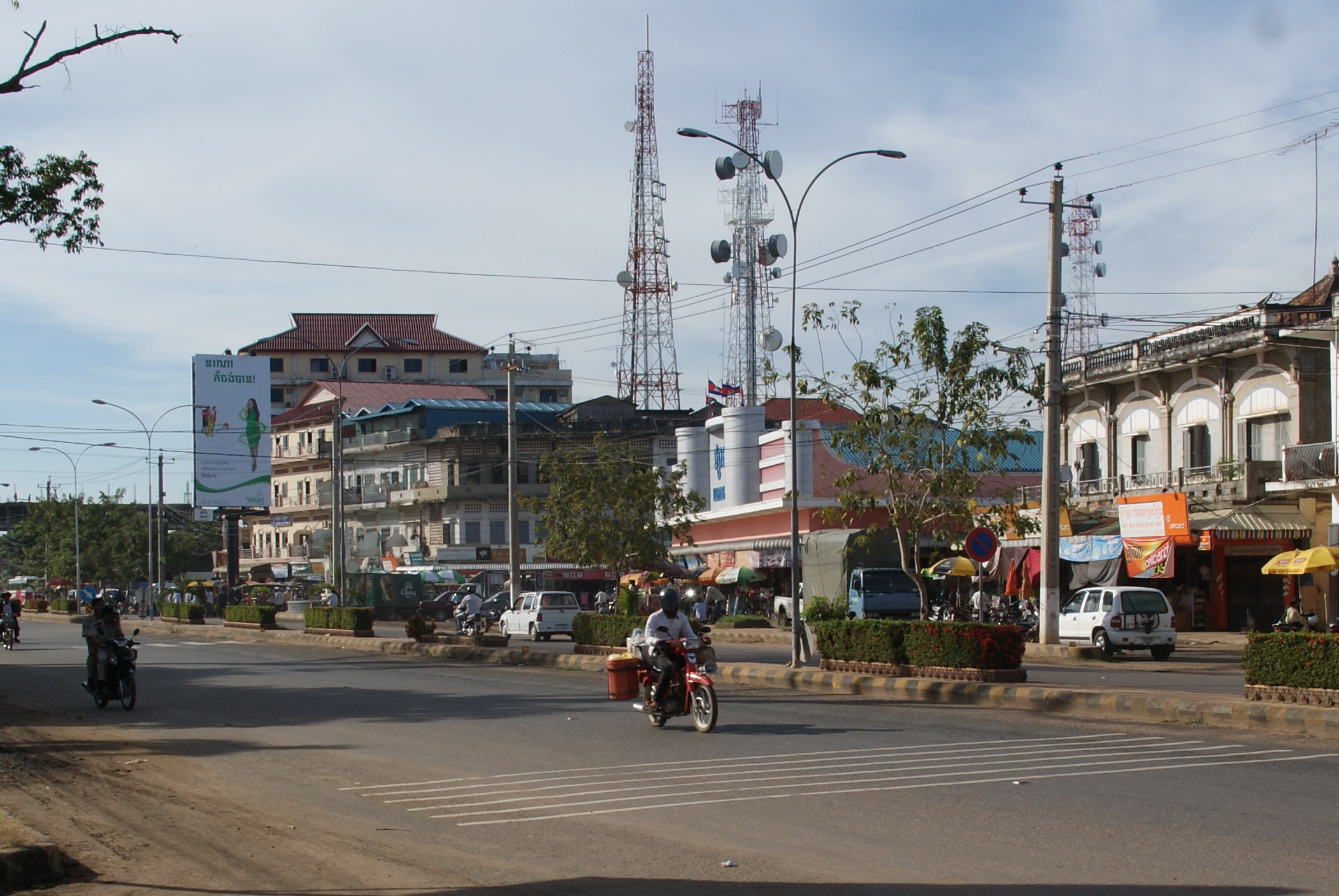
- Interactive map of Stueng Saen
- Country: Cambodia
- Province: Kampong Thom
- Time zone: UTC+07:00 (ICT)
- Geocode: 0603

Stueng Saen Municipality (Khmer: ក្រុងស្ទឹងសែន) is a municipality, also a district within Kampong Thom province, in central Cambodia. According to the 1998 census of Cambodia, it had a population of 66,014.

== Etymology ==
Stueng Saen (ស្ទឹងសែន) means "river of soldiers" in Khmer. Stueng (ស្ទឹង) means river in Khmer, while Saen (សែន) is derived from the Sanskrit word Sena (सेना) meaning "soldier".

== Administration ==
The following table shows the villages of Stueng Saen Municipality by commune.

Khum (Communes)	Phum (Villages)
Damrei Choan Khla	Ballangk Kaeut, Ballangk Lech, Pou Bak Ka, Damrei Choan Khla
Kampong Thum	Phum Ti Muoy, Phum Ti Pir, Phum Ti Bei, Phum Ti Buon, Phum Ti Pram, Phum Ti Prammuoy, Phum Ti Prampir
Kampong Roteh	Kampong Thum, Kampong Roteh
Ou Kanthor	Preaek Sbov, Ou Kanthor Tboung, Ou Kanthor Cheung, Boeng Leas
Kampong Krabau	Snaeng Krabei, Stueng Saen, Kampong Krabau
Prey Ta Hu	Sla Kaet, Kdei, Prey Ta Hu
Achar Leak	Krachab, Achar Leak, Prey Banlech
Srayov	Roluos, Pramat Dei, Kampong Samraong, Pou Saen Snay, Pou Ta Un, Trapeang Veaeng, Srayov Cheung, Srayov Tboung, Puk Yuk, Mneav, Chambak, Kamraeng, Roka
