= Kampuchea Revolutionary Army =

Armed Forces of Kampuchea from 1975 to 1979

Revolutionary Army of Kampuchea
- កងទ័ពរំដោះកម្ពុជា
- Kampuchea Revolutionary Army
- Founded: 17 January 1968(First offensive); 22 July 1975(Last form)
- Disbanded: 1979
- Service branches: Army; Navy; Air Force
- Headquarters: Phnom Penh

Leadership
- Commander-in-Chief: Pol Pot
- Minister of National Defense: Son Sen

Personnel
- Conscription: Yes
- Active personnel: 140,000
- Reserve personnel: 80,000

Industry
- Foreign suppliers: North Korea; China; Vietnam (until 1976)

The Revolutionary Army of Kampuchea (Khmer: កងទ័ពរំដោះកម្ពុជា, RAK) was the official name of the armed forces of Democratic Kampuchea (DK), the state ruled by Angkar following the fall of Phnom Penh to the Khmer Rouge at the end of the Cambodian Civil War on 17 April 1975. While the RAK functioned as the national army from 1975 onwards, the military was heavily equipped by the People's Liberation Army (PLA). China was the primary supplier of weaponry, including Type 56 rifles and tanks, while the Korean People's Army (KPA) also provided critical "internationalist aid," including military training and technical assistance for the Khmer Rouge cadres. While China provided the vast majority of aid (estimated at 90%), North Korea (DPRK) was Democratic Kampuchea's second largest trading partner and a key source of technical and military assistance.

== History ==
=== Formation ===
The name "Revolutionary Army of Kampuchea" first emerged on 17 January 1967 during the peasant uprising in Samlout District, Battambang province. In practice, it was a general term for the independent armed groups of the Khmer Rouge, which were primarily divided into three factions:

- The Northeastern Group, led by Pol Pot, was based in Cambodia's northeastern highlands among ethnic minorities.
- The Southwestern Group, led by Hu Nim, operated in southern and southwestern Cambodia, in the Cardamom and Elephant Mountain ranges.
- The Eastern Group, led by So Phim, was based in the densely populated eastern provinces between the Mekong River and the Vietnamese border.

The Khmer Rouge regime marked the anniversary of the Revolutionary Army of Kampuchea on 17 January 1968 the date which marked the first offensive of the Khmer Rouge. It was aimed more at gathering weapons and spreading propaganda than in seizing territory since, at that time, the adherents of the insurgency numbered no more than 4,000–5,000. In the years that followed, widespread dissatisfaction with the Sihanouk regime drove many Cambodians to flee government repression and join Khmer Rouge armed groups, leading to a rapid increase in the Revolutionary Army of Cambodia's ranks.

=== Alliance with Sihanouk ===
The situation shifted in favour of the Khmer Rouge after the March 18, 1970 coup, in which Prime Minister Lon Nol, backed by the United States, ousted Head of State Norodom Sihanouk while he was abroad. In response, Sihanouk announced the formation of the National United Front of Kampuchea (FUNK) and the Royal Government of National Union of Kampuchea (GRUNK), aligning himself with all forces opposed to Lon Nol, the strongest among them being the Khmer Rouge.

As a result, the Revolutionary Army of Kampuchea was reorganized into the Cambodian People's National Liberation Armed Forces (CPNLAF), absorbing armed groups loyal to Sihanouk. Sihanouk's influence in rural Cambodia allowed the Khmer Rouge to expand their power significantly. By 1973, they effectively controlled most of Cambodia's territory, though only a small portion of its population. Many Cambodians who supported the Khmer Rouge did so under the belief that they were fighting for Sihanouk's return.

It was the CPNLAF that ultimately captured Phnom Penh and overthrew the Khmer Republic on 17th of April 1975, establishing complete Khmer Rouge rule over Cambodia.

On 22 July 1975 the Kampuchea Revolutionary Army was formally established in a large ceremony inside the compound of the Olympic Stadium which was attended by some 3,000 members of the Revolutionary Army.

=== Purges and conflict with Vietnam ===
Even before taking full power, the Khmer Rouge had begun purging the CPNLAF of Sihanouk's influence. From 1972 onward, after Richard Nixon's visit to China, Pol Pot's faction received increased backing from Beijing and gradually consolidated absolute control over the Communist Party of Kampuchea (CPK).

Once they secured power, the Khmer Rouge immediately executed former officers of the Khmer National Armed Forces and their families, without trials or publicity, to eliminate potential enemies. Additionally, they conducted large-scale internal purges, not only removing remnants of Sihanouk's supporters but also eradicating any suspected dissent to centralise power further.

The CPNLAF was restructured again into a formal national military force. Around 1976, it reverted to the name Revolutionary Army of Kampuchea, now as the unified national military of Democratic Kampuchea. Its air force was established in 1977.

From as early as 1975, the Khmer Rouge launched cross-border attacks into Vietnam, burning villages, looting, and massacring civilians. Vietnam initially responded with restraint, limiting its actions to defensive counterattacks. However, as Pol Pot prepared for a full-scale war against Vietnam, he initiated another purge, executing numerous Khmer Rouge officials suspected of Vietnamese ties. Only a few, such as Heng Samrin and Hun Sen, managed to escape to Vietnam.

=== Swift war and defeat ===
The war against Vietnam proved disastrous for the Khmer Rouge. Since the early 1970s, Vietnamese leaders had anticipated Khmer Rouge hostilities and took precautionary measures. From 1975 to 1978, Vietnam pursued a dual strategy: responding with restraint while simultaneously preparing for an inevitable war in the southwest.

By late 1978, Vietnam had established the Kampuchean United Front for National Salvation (FUNSK), composed of former Khmer Rouge officials, soldiers, and Cambodian exiles. Under the banner of FUNSK, Vietnam formed a Volunteer Army to liberate Cambodia from the Khmer Rouge genocide.

In just two weeks, Vietnamese forces obliterated the Khmer Rouge's main military divisions, captured Phnom Penh, and established the People's Republic of Kampuchea.

=== U.S. and Chinese alliance ===
Under the overwhelming assault of Vietnamese forces, the Khmer Rouge quickly disintegrated. Most of its remaining forces retreated to the Thai-Cambodian border, where they established long-term bases and maintained control over border areas for the next decade. Small remnants continued to engage in guerrilla warfare. By late 1979, the Khmer Rouge reorganized its armed groups into the National Army of Democratic Kampuchea, built from what remained of the Revolutionary Army of Kampuchea.

Despite this, the weaknesses of the People's Republic of Kampuchea (PRK) led to its complete dependence on Vietnam—a country that had just emerged from two major wars, was now engaged in two border conflicts, and was struggling with a devastated economy.

Vietnam's intervention to destroy the Khmer Rouge triggered strong reactions from its adversaries. China, the United States, and ASEAN nations backed the formation of a Cambodian government-in-exile and the military alliance known as the Coalition Government of Democratic Kampuchea (CGDK), which included the Khmer Rouge, the Khmer People's National Liberation Front (KPNLF), and the royalist ANS (Armee Nationale Sihanoukiste). However, the Khmer Rouge remained the dominant military force within this three-party coalition, playing the leading role in prolonging the conflict against the Vietnam-backed Phnom Penh government for a decade.

During this period, the Khmer Rouge continued to receive foreign support from China, the United States, Thailand, and other countries hostile to Vietnam. However, this support was only enough to sustain its resistance—it was unable to regain its former strength. At its peak, the Khmer Rouge controlled around 20% of Cambodia's territory but only 5% of the population, compared to the Vietnam-backed Phnom Penh government.

=== Collapse ===
With Vietnam's full support, the People's Republic of Kampuchea gradually consolidated its control over the country. It also actively pursued diplomatic measures to isolate the Khmer Rouge, including reconciliation with other Cambodian exile factions.

In 1989, Vietnam withdrew its troops from Cambodia after securing the Phnom Penh government's stability and military strength. Peace negotiations led to the establishment of a coalition government for a constitutional monarchy with a multi-party system and democratic freedoms.

As the Khmer Rouge refused to compromise, it became increasingly isolated. Although it continued military operations, boycotted elections, and rejected the results, it now faced opposition from Cambodia's new coalition government. This government included not only former Vietnamese-backed communists, led by Hun Sen, but also ex-Khmer Rouge allies, including non-communist and royalist factions such as Prince Norodom Ranariddh's forces.

Deprived of food supplies, trade goods, and international aid, the Khmer Rouge was forced into self-sufficiency. It had to abandon refugee camps, where international humanitarian aid had previously provided medicine and food. Public morale within Khmer Rouge-controlled areas collapsed.

After Pol Pot's death in April 1998, the Khmer Rouge became a spent force, barely surviving. By late 1999, its last remaining commanders and soldiers surrendered to the Cambodian government, marking the final end of the Khmer Rouge.

== Organization ==
=== Revolutionary Army Ground Force of Kampuchea ===
The Revolutionary Army Ground Force of Kampuchea was the official name of the army of Democratic Kampuchea during the period of 1975 to 1979, mainly consisting of Khmer Rouge operatives. In 1979 during the Cambodian–Vietnamese War it was reformed into the National Army of Democratic Kampuchea to continue to fight against the People's Army of Vietnam and the new Kampuchean People's Revolutionary Armed Forces.

=== Revolutionary Navy of Kampuchea ===
The Revolutionary Navy of Kampuchea (Khmer: កងទ័ពជើងទឹករំដោះកម្ពុជា, LNK) under the new Khmer Rouge regime had a backbone force of 17 American-made Swift class patrol boats (seven of which were sunk in May 1975 by U.S. air attack during the Mayaguez incident). Additionally the Navy also possessed 2 submarine chasers E311 and E312 (PC-461-class), 3 LCUs and 1 LCM and a number of small river boats.

=== Air Force of the Revolutionary Army of Kampuchea ===
The Air Force of the Revolutionary Army of Kampuchea (Khmer: កងទ័ពអាកាសនៃកងទ័ពរំដោះកម្ពុជា, AFLAK) was mainly defunct for the time that Democratic Kampuchea existed. Many aircraft were captured from Khmer Air Force including many western types. During the Mayaguez incident, 5 T-28 Trojan aircraft were destroyed. All aircraft were destroyed or captured in 1979 during the Vietnamese invasion of Cambodia.

== Equipment ==
=== Infantry weapons ===
Name	Origin	Notes
Semi-automatic pistols
TT pistol	Soviet Union	Supplied by North Vietnam during the Cambodian Civil War.
Makarov pistol	Soviet Union	Supplied by North Vietnam during the Cambodian Civil War.
Type 54 pistol	China	Supplied by China during and after the Cambodian Civil War.
Semi-automatic rifles
SKS	Soviet Union	Captured from FANK and supplied by North Vietnam during the Cambodian Civil War.
Assault Rifles
AK-47	Soviet Union	Captured from FANK and supplied by North Vietnam during the Cambodian Civil War.
Type 56 assault rifle	China	Supplied by China during and after the Cambodian Civil War.
M16 rifle	United States	Captured from FANK during the Cambodian Civil War.
Light machine guns
RPD	Soviet Union	Captured from FANK and supplied by North Vietnam during the Cambodian Civil War.
Type 56 LMG	China	Supplied by China during and after the Cambodian Civil War.
Heavy machine guns
DShK	Soviet Union	Supplied by North Vietnam during the Cambodian Civil War.
Type 54	China	Supplied by China during and after the Cambodian Civil War.
M1919 Browning	United States	Captured from FANK during the Cambodian Civil War.
M2 Browning	United States	Captured from FANK during the Cambodian Civil War.
General-purpose machine guns
PKM	Soviet Union	Supplied by North Vietnam during the Cambodian Civil War.
M60 machine gun	United States	Captured from FANK during the Cambodian Civil War.
Rocket-propelled grenades
RPG-2	Soviet Union	Captured from FANK and supplied by North Vietnam during the Cambodian Civil War.
RPG-7	Soviet Union	Captured from FANK and supplied by North Vietnam during the Cambodian Civil War.
Grenade launchers
M79	United States	Captured from FANK.

=== Armored Fighting Vehicles ===
Name	Origin	Quantity	Notes
Light tanks
Type 62	China	20	Supplied by China during and after the Cambodian Civil War.
Type 63	China	~10	Supplied by China during and after the Cambodian Civil War.
Armored personnel carriers
M113	United States	~200	Captured from FANK during the Cambodian Civil War.

=== Artillery ===
Name	Origin	Caliber	Quantity	Notes
Mortars
M29	United States	81mm	Unknown	Captured from FANK during the Cambodian Civil War.
Recoilless rifles
M20	United States	75mm	Unknown	Captured from FANK during the Cambodian Civil War.
M40	United States	105mm	Unknown	Captured from FANK during the Cambodian Civil War.
Anti-tank guns
ZiS-3	Soviet Union	76mm	~10	Captured from FANK during the Cambodian Civil War.
Howitzers
M46	Soviet Union	130mm	~30	Supplied by North Vietnam during the Cambodian Civil War.
M-30	Soviet Union	122mm	~10	Captured from FANK during the Cambodian Civil War.
M101	United States	105mm	~20	Captured from FANK during the Cambodian Civil War.
M114	United States	155mm	~10	Captured from FANK during the Cambodian Civil War.
Multiple rocket launchers
BM-13	Soviet Union	132mm	~10	Captured from FANK during the Cambodian Civil War.

=== Air defence ===
Name	Origin	Caliber	Quantity	Notes
Anti-aircraft guns
ZPU	Soviet Union	14.5mm	Unknown	Captured from FANK and supplied by North Vietnam during the Cambodian Civil War.
61-K	Soviet Union	37mm	~30	Captured from FANK and supplied by North Vietnam during the Cambodian Civil War.
S-60	Soviet Union	57mm	~10	Captured from FANK and supplied by North Vietnam during the Cambodian Civil War.

=== Aircraft ===
Aircraft	Origin	Quantity	Notes
Fighter aircraft
Shenyang J-6C	China	6	Supplied by China in 1977.
Trainer aircraft
GY-80 Horizon	France	4	Captured from FANK during the Cambodian Civil War.
Cessna O-1 Bird Dog	United States	10	Captured from FANK during the Cambodian Civil War.
Attack aircraft
Helio AU-24A Stallion	United States	9	Captured from FANK during the Cambodian Civil War.
T-28D Trojan	United States	22	5 destroyed during the Mayagüez Incident.
Cessna A-37B Dragonfly	United States	10	Captured from FANK during the Cambodian Civil War.
Transports
Fairchild C-123K Provider	United States	7	Captured from FANK during the Cambodian Civil War.
Douglas C-47	United States	14	Captured from FANK during the Cambodian Civil War.
Douglas AC-47 Spooky	United States	6	Captured from FANK during the Cambodian Civil War.
Bombers
Harbin H-5	China	3	Supplied by China in 1977.
Utility helicopters
Bell UH-1H/1G	United States	20	Captured from FANK during the Cambodian Civil War.

=== Ships ===
Ship	Origin	Hull number	Quantity	Fate
Patrol boats
Higgins 78ft	Yugoslavia	Unknown	2	Sunk during the Mayagüez incident.
Patrol Boat, River	United States	Unknown	40	A few have been sunk during the Battle of Ream.
Patrol Craft Fast	United States	Unknown	17	A few have been sunk during the Mayagüez incident and skirmishes between Thailand and Vietnam.
PC-461-class	United States	E311 - E312	2	E311 fled to Thailand. E312 fled to the Philippines.
Landing craft
LCM-8	United States	Unknown	10	Sunk during skirmishes between Thailand and Vietnam.
LCU 1466	United States	Unknown	10	Sunk during skirmishes between Thailand and Vietnam.
LCT-6	United States	Unknown	2	Sunk during skirmishes between Thailand and Vietnam.
LSM	United States	Unknown	Unknown	Unknown. Used in raid Phu Quoc and Tho Chu.
