= Prasat Sambour District =

Prasat Sambour ស្រុកប្រាសាទសម្បូរ
- District (srok)
- Interactive map of Prasat Sambour
- Country: Cambodia
- Province: Kampong Thom
- Time zone: +7
- Geocode: 0605

Prasat Sambour is a district within Kampong Thom Province, in central Cambodia. According to the 1998 census of Cambodia, it had a population of 36,983.

It is known for its ancient monuments and temples.

== Administration ==
The following table shows the villages of Prasat Sambour District by commune.

Khum (Communes)	Phum (Villages)
Chhuk	Aksar Krahay, Serei Sokha, Chhuk Boeng, Chhuk Stueng, S'ier, Chhuk Kruos, Anlong Slaeng, Boeng Khvaek, Krabau, Kamping Ta Kong, Ta Aok, Prasat, Veal Veaeng, Anlong Khtum, Tuek Andoung, Trapeang Sala
Koul	Kampong Chvea, Ou Ta Siev, Chamreh, Bak Srei, Tuol Char, Tuol Thnong, Panhchak La, Kyov, Chheu Teal Chrum, Kampong Luk, Tuol Pongro
Sambour	Kampong Chheu Teal, Sambour, Samret, Chramas, Koun K'aek, Cheay Sampov, Pou Tret, Chranieng, Preaek, Char Chrum, Trapeang Chrok, Pralay, Char, Ou Kru Kae, At Su
Sraeung	Tnaot Chuor, Anlong Slaeng, Boeng Khvaek, Beng, Svay, Choam Boeng, Tumnob, Thmei, Sraeung
Tang Krasau	Tang Krasau, Prey Kdei, Tang Stoung, Thmei, Souriya, Tang Krang, Tuek Andoung, Kampong Chheu Teal, Kouk Srok, Choam, Kampong Krasang, Ta Paong, Pralay, Chi Neang, Krabau Sraong
