= Kampong Thom city =

Kampong Thom ក្រុងកំពង់ធំ
- City
- Kampong Thom City
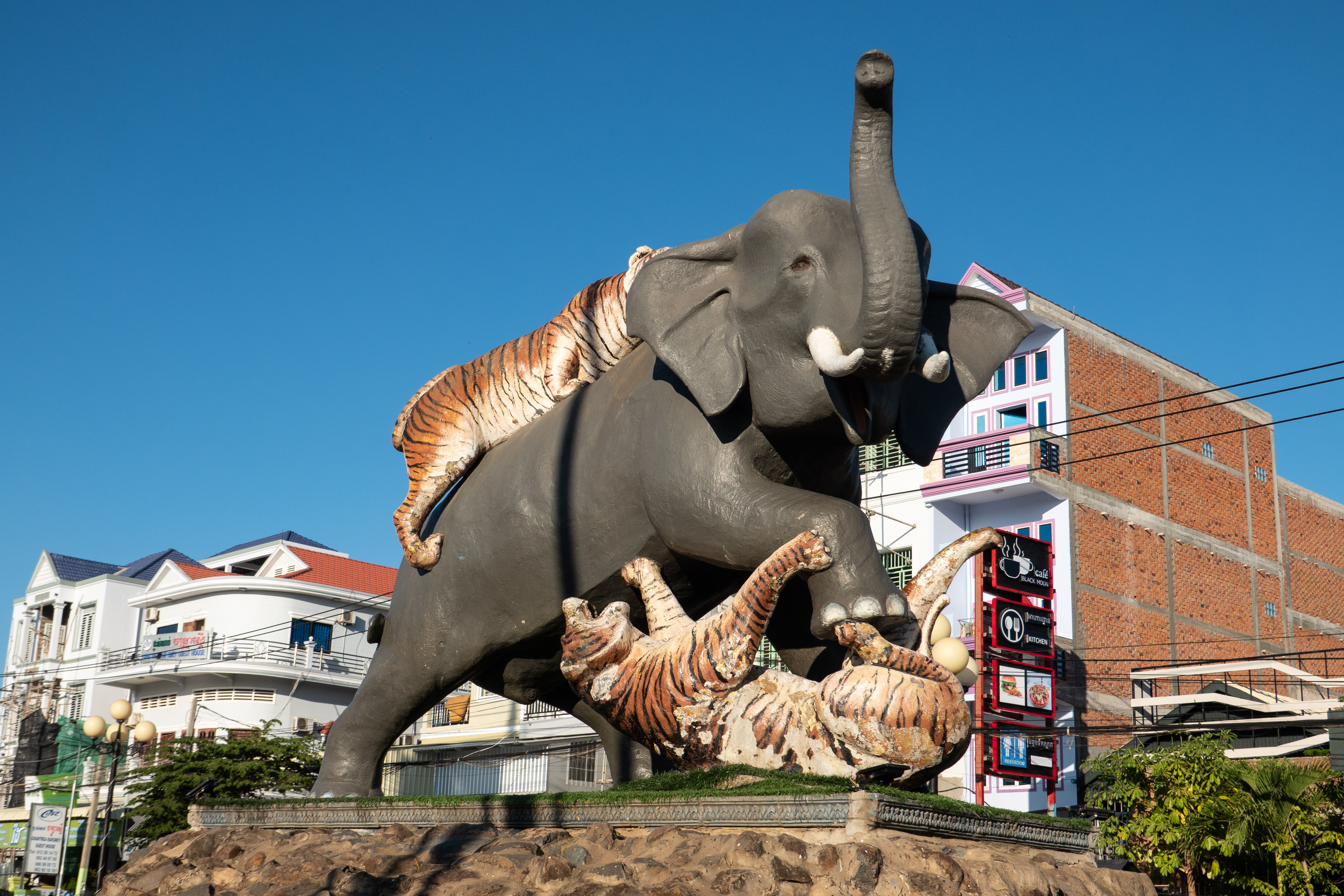
- Landmark in city center

- Location within Cambodia
- Coordinates: 12°42′N 104°54′E
- Country: Cambodia
- Province: Kampong Thom
- District: Stueng Saen District

Area
  - Total: 367.5 km^{2} (141.9 sq mi)
- Elevation: 10 m (33 ft)

Population (2019)
  - Total: 53,118
- Time zone: UTC+7 (Cambodia)

Kampong Thom (Khmer: ក្រុងកំពង់ធំ), also Krong Kampong Thom, is the capital city of Kampong Thom Province, Cambodia lying on the bank of the Steung Saen River. It is a mid-way stopover on the National Highway No 6 halfway between Phnom Penh and Siem Reap.

The Kampong Thom High School is north of the river bridge, and the Kampong Thom Market is on the south side of the bridge, followed by the main street and dual carriageway. Further south along the road is Steung Saen (Khmer: ក្រុងស្ទឹងសែន) also a district in Kampong Thom Province and a side road to the Floating Pagoda (វត្ត ក្ដីអណ្ដែត).

One of Kampong Thom's landmarks is a roundabout with a statue of an elephant fighting two tigers.

== Climate ==
Climate data for Kampong Thom (1982–2024)
Month	Jan	Feb	Mar	Apr	May	Jun	Jul	Aug	Sep	Oct	Nov	Dec	Year
Mean daily maximum °C (°F)	31.7 (89.1)	32.6 (90.7)	34.3 (93.7)	33.7 (92.7)	34.6 (94.3)	33.7 (92.7)	32.9 (91.2)	31.4 (88.5)	32.4 (90.3)	31.7 (89.1)	31.3 (88.3)	30.4 (86.7)	32.6 (90.6)
Mean daily minimum °C (°F)	20.1 (68.2)	20.4 (68.7)	22.6 (72.7)	23.1 (73.6)	23.6 (74.5)	22.8 (73.0)	22.1 (71.8)	22.6 (72.7)	23.1 (73.6)	22.9 (73.2)	21.7 (71.1)	20.4 (68.7)	22.1 (71.8)
Average precipitation mm (inches)	1.8 (0.07)	4.5 (0.18)	44.3 (1.74)	97.0 (3.82)	169.5 (6.67)	207.2 (8.16)	164.2 (6.46)	203.3 (8.00)	306.2 (12.06)	253.1 (9.96)	99.3 (3.91)	13.5 (0.53)	1,563.9 (61.56)
Source: World Meteorological Organization
