= Dong Ba Thin Base Camp =

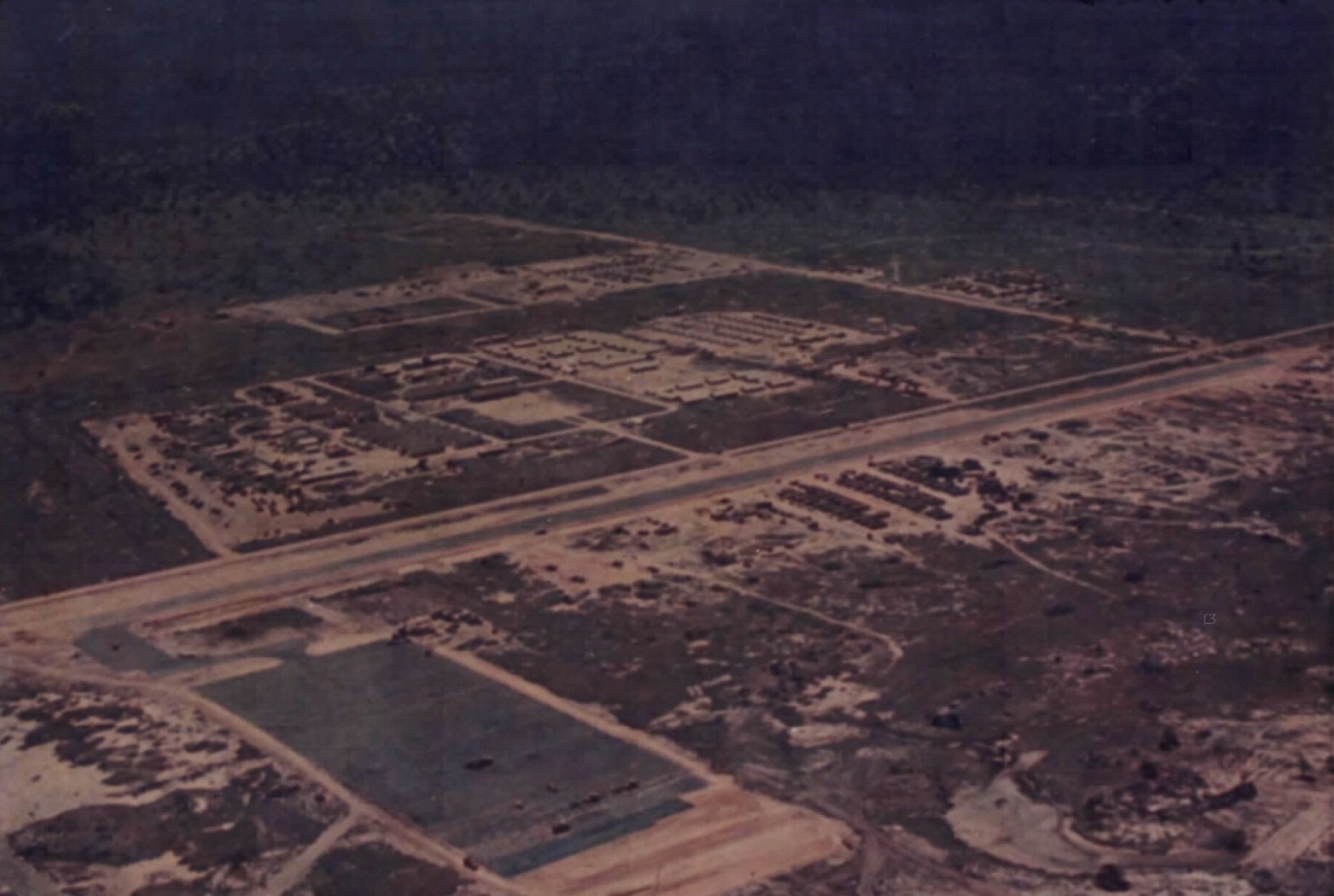
- Dong Ba Thin Base Camp, 24 February 1966

Site information
- Type: Army Base
- Controlled by: 5th Special Forces Group

Location
- Coordinates: 12.021°N 109.186°E

Site history
- Built: 1964
- In use: 1964-present
- Battles/wars: Vietnam War

Dong Ba Thin Airfield
- IATA: none; ICAO: none

Summary
- Elevation AMSL: 6 ft (1.8 m)

Runways
Direction	Length		Surface
Direction	ft	m	Surface
	2,300	701	asphalt

Dong Ba Thin Base Camp (also known as Dong Ba Thin Airfield and Dong Ba Thin Special Forces Camp) is a former U.S. Army base located northwest of Cam Ranh Base in Khánh Hòa Province, southern Vietnam.

== History ==
Dong Ba Thin Base Camp was established on Highway 1 at Dong Ba Thin, 4 km northwest of Cam Ranh Base and 22 km south of Nha Trang in 1964.

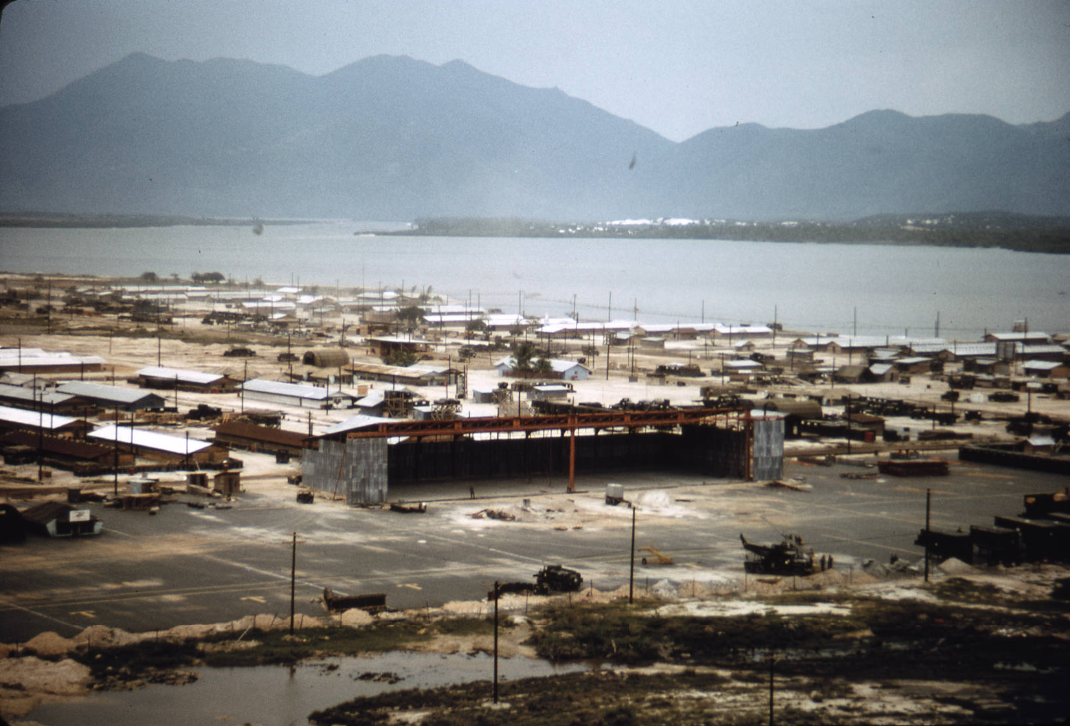
Dong Ba Thin hangar construction, 21 September 1967

The base comprised several different adjacent facilities: Dong Ba Thin Airfield, a short asphalt runway army airfield; Dong Ba Thin Heliport (also known as Flanders Army Heliport) on the west side of the airfield and the Special Forces Camp.

The Special Forces Camp was first established by Detachment B-1, 5th Special Forces Group in December 1964 and was later used by Detachments 37, B-51, A-132, A-411 and A-521. In addition, the facility was a Special Forces forward operating base and used for Military Assistance Command, Vietnam – Studies and Observations Group operations.

From November 1970 to February 1973 the base was used by the United States Army Vietnam UITG individual training group battalion, responsible for the training of Khmer National Armed Forces (FANK) infantry battalions in weapons use, tactics and first aid.

In March 1972 the 18-man 2nd New Zealand Army Training Team Vietnam (2 NZATTV), which included members from different branches of service including two Royal New Zealand Navy (RNZN) personnel, was deployed to the camp to assist with the training of FANK personnel, they would remain there until December 1972.

With the withdrawal of US and New Zealand forces from South Vietnam in 1972-3, the training mission was taken over by the Army of the Republic of Vietnam.

== Current use ==
The base remains in use by the 101st Naval Infantry Brigade of the People's Army of Vietnam.

== See also ==
- Army of the Republic of Vietnam Special Forces
- Cambodian Civil War
- Khmer National Armed Forces
- Khmer Serei
- United States Special Forces
- Vietnam War
