= Khmer National Armed Forces =

Combined military forces of the Khmer Republic from 1970 to 1975

- កងយោធពលខេមរជាតិ (Khmer); Forces armées nationales khmères (French)
- Khmer National Armed Forces (FANK) coat-of-arms, 1970–75
- Founded: 9 October 1970
- Disbanded: 17 April 1975
- Service branches: Khmer National Army; Khmer Special Forces; Cambodian Para-Commando Battalion; Tiger Brigade; Lake Brigade; Khmer National Navy; Cambodian Navy SEALs; Cambodian Marine Corps; Khmer Air Force; Cambodian Airborne Brigade; National Gendarmerie
- Headquarters: Phnom Penh, Khmer Republic

Leadership
- Commander-in-Chief: Lieutenant General Sosthène Fernandez; Lieutenant General Sak Sutsakhan
- Minister of Defence: Lieutenant General Sak Sutsakhan
- Chief of Joint Staff/Chief of General Staff: Lieutenant General Sosthène Fernandez
- Deputy Chief of Staff: Lieutenant General Sak Sutsakhan

Personnel
- Active personnel: 320,000 (1973)

Industry
- Foreign suppliers: Australia; France; Indonesia; Israel; Japan; Laos; Malaysia; New Zealand; Philippines; Singapore; South Korea; South Vietnam; Taiwan; Thailand; United Kingdom; United States

Related articles
- History: Military history of Cambodia

The Khmer National Armed Forces (Khmer: កងយោធពលខេមរជាតិ; (Note: UNGEGN: Kâng Yoŭthôpôl Khémôrôchéatĕ, ALA-LC: Kang Yodhabal Khemarajāti, IPA: [kɑːŋ joːtʰeaʔpɔl kʰeːmaraʔciət]) French: Forces armées nationales khmères, FANK) were the combined military forces of the Khmer Republic, a short-lived nationalist and militaristic state that existed from 1970 to 1975, known today as Cambodia. The FANK was the successor of the Royal Khmer Armed Forces (French: Forces armées royales khmères, FARK) which had been responsible for the defense of the previous Kingdom of Cambodia since its independence in 1953 from France.

== General overview ==
Being essentially a continuation of the old Royal armed forces under a new name, the FANK played a more partisan role in the Cambodian Civil War that escalated following the deposition as Head of State of Prince Norodom Sihanouk by a coup d’état in March 1970 orchestrated by his own Prime-Minister General Lon Nol and cousin Sirik Matak. Although the armed forces of the Kingdom had been involved since April 1967 in the suppression of the Communist Party of Kampuchea's rebellion led by Saloth Sar (better known as Pol Pot), up until Sihanouk's overthrow it was considered to have the consensual backing of the Cambodian society, as the Prince was considered the symbol of the people.

== History ==
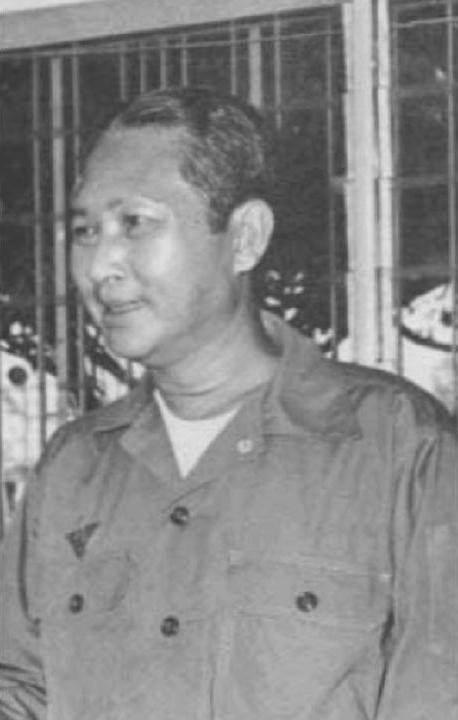
Marshal Lon Nol, President of the Khmer Republic, Phnom Penh, Cambodia, 31 March 1972.

On November 20, 1953, the French protectorate of Cambodia was granted full independence by France, allowing the young King Norodom Sihanouk to lead the government of the first post-colonial state in French-ruled Indochina. Under the terms of the Geneva Accords signed the following year which ended the Indochina War, French Army and Vietnamese Vietminh guerrilla units still operating in Cambodia were obliged to withdraw from its territory and that a new defense force was to be raised. Trained by the French and equipped by the United States since September 1950, the armed forces of the new Kingdom of Cambodia (French: Forces Armées Royales Khmères – FARK) were formed mainly by Khmer regular soldiers recently transferred from French colonial units, though ex-Vietminh and former Khmer Issarak guerrillas of Khmer origin were also allowed to join.

Most of the senior members of the Officer corps had been officials in the colonial regime. Lon Nol, for example, served as Commander of the Cambodian Police under the French protectorate. In 1955 Gen. Lon was promoted to Chief-of-Staff of the FARK, and in 1960 was appointed Minister of Defense. Meanwhile, Cambodia was admitted as a protocol state member of the US-sponsored SEATO alliance and under his command the FARK became a bastion of American influence on the Sihanouk regime, particularly because US military aid constituted 30% of the Royal Cambodian Armed Forces' budget until the coup against President Ngô Đình Diệm in South Vietnam led Prince Sihanouk to cancel on 20 November 1963 all American aid, and on 15 January 1964 the U.S. MAAG aid program was suspended, then renounced in August 1964 by the Cambodian government when Cambodia adopted a neutrality policy.

Following his faction's seizure of a large number of seats of the ruling Sangkum party's representation at the National Assembly in the 1966 general elections, Gen. Lon was elected Prime-Minister, thereby locking the state institutions under the firm grip of the military, just as Sihanouk had apprehended. However, he resigned from the post in 1967 after a car accident, only to return two years later when the monarch mounted a renewed purge against leftist dissidents.

As a representative of the conservative Khmer who had supported the French rule, Lon Nol never accepted Sihanouk's neutralist policy of non-alignment. Though the Prince's sporadic purges of leftist movements would quench Lon's wrath at the growing communist insurgency, what truly worried him was Sihanouk's covert deals with North Vietnam and the Viet Cong, which allowed them to establish base-camps on the Cambodian side of the border with South Vietnam and built a massive supply infrastructure (Ho Chi Minh trail). Lon also knew that Sihanouk's balancing appeasement of the US from 1968 onwards by allowing B-52 aerial bombings and ‘hot pursuit’ cross-border raids against NVA/VC base areas within Cambodia would be ineffective in stopping the wider, home-grown communist insurgency. One of the measures he was able to undertake was the build-up of a strong anti-communist faction within the FARK's officer corps that would back him should Sihanouk shift again towards the left.

=== Alignment with the United States ===
On March 17, 1970, while Sihanouk was absent from the country on a state visit to China and the USSR, Lon Nol assumed power when the National Assembly in Phnom Penh unanimously voted the Prince out of office. Lon Nol automatically succeeded the latter as Head of State on August 18, and although he claimed that the move was constitutionally legal, it quickly ran afoul of the conservative mentality of the Cambodians, many of whom believed that the Prince ruled through divine favour. To further aggrieve matters, Prince Sihanouk, who had sought refuge in China after being deposed, established a political base in Beijing and entered into an alliance with the increasingly Maoist-oriented Khmer Rouge leadership and other leftist opposition groups. In April 1970 these disparate groups formed the FUNK, an umbrella organization dedicated to the armed overthrow of the pro-western Khmer Republic.

Lon Nol also had to deal with a number of dissident FARK senior officers whom, though sharing most of his views, felt that the overthrow of Sihanouk had been one step too far. Many of these royalist officers resigned in protest from the armed forces' structure when Gen. Lon proceeded to transform with American help the old FARK into the FANK to accommodate the character of the new Republican regime. By contrast, new recruits were readily available from the ranks of the far-right Khmer Serei, a US-backed anti-communist guerrilla group led by the hardline Nationalist Son Ngoc Thanh which had fought against Sihanouk's regime during the 1960s and who always viewed him as a communist crony.

The measures quickly implemented by Lon Nol's administration included the issue of ultimata demanding North Vietnamese Army (NVA) and Vietcong units to vacate the bases they had established on Khmer soil, and prevented arms shipments bound to the Vietcong from being unloaded at Cambodian sea ports. These same measures however, coupled by the effects of the joint US Army/Army of the Republic of Vietnam (ARVN) Cambodian Incursion launched that same year against NVA/VC sanctuaries in Cambodia, resulted in a heavy backlash. In reality, the newly created Khmer Republic and its ill-prepared armed forces were soon caught off-guard in the early 1970s by the aggressive reaction of the NVA, which had previously limited its actions to providing support to Vietcong units operating at South Vietnam even after its devastating defeat in the January 1968 Tet Offensive. The outcome was that the period of Lon Nol's rule actually saw an increase of North Vietnamese military presence in the lower Mekong and Bassac corridors and in the north and northeast Cambodia, particularly from 1972 onwards. In response to the earlier FANK's failed ground offensives to expel them, strong NVA units launched in turn throughout 1971-72 ferocious counter-offensives on these areas – using heavy artillery, tanks, and SA-7 Grail surface-to-air missiles for the first time in Cambodia –, which dwarfed the Tet Offensive numerically. These massive-scale operations only served to exhaust both sides however, and led to the signing in January 1973 of the Paris Peace Accords which marked the official end of American direct involvement on combat operations in Vietnam. The Accords hit both the Khmer Republic and South Vietnam hard, as the military and financial aid that they received from the US was cut by over fifty percent (though American military personnel in Cambodia continued to coordinate the various military aid programs, sometimes finding themselves involved in prohibited advisory and combat tasks until 1975.) The FANK, which until that date had been armed, supplied, and maintained by American advisors and technicians, now faced a new reality in which they had to repair their own equipment and train their troops as best as they could with far less of a budget.

=== The Civil War years ===
The FANK suffered its first major setback in February 1971 during Operation Chenla I, an offensive launched earlier in late August 1970 targeting North Vietnamese strongholds in northeastern Cambodia, when a Cambodian Army combined twelve battalion-strong task-force was annihilated by a NVA counterattack that ripped apart many elite Cambodian military units, including some of the American-trained Khmer Krom volunteer battalions recruited straight out of South Vietnam. Almost simultaneously, the NVA hit Pochentong Airbase with a devastating "Sapper" attack, which succeeded in destroying nearly entirely the Khmer Air Force on the ground. A second attempt to recover the lost momentum of Chenla I was made in late August 1971 with Operation Chenla II, which saw another FANK task-force being decimated again by an NVA counterattack held later in December that year. Indeed, the final attack on FANK positions during that month virtually wiped out ten infantry battalions (including again the sacrifice of the best Khmer Krom battalions) and resulted in the loss of another ten battalions-worth of equipment.

The creation of the Chinese-sponsored FUNK coalition by Sihanouk and the lending of his popular support to the anti-Republican insurgency gave it greater legitimacy in the eyes of the pro-Sihanoukist Cambodian peasantry, many of whom began to flock into its ranks. This move inadvertently also allowed the Khmer Rouge to recruit peasants from the villages on the rural areas under their control that otherwise would have been uninterested. In addition, many politically moderate Cambodians came to dislike Lon Nol's authoritarian (and unstable) republican regime, due to his corrupt ways and oppressive rule that curbed political and civil rights far more than Sihanouk had done.

In the wake of the January 1973 Paris Peace Accords, Lon Nol proved unable to halt the illegal build-up of North Vietnamese forces in the lower Mekong-Bassac area in preparation for a renewed offensive in neighbouring South Vietnam. He also failed to engage in a properly coordinated war effort with either the American CIA or the Southern Vietnamese Nguyen Van Thieu regime.

Meanwhile, FANK troops committed numerous Human Rights abuses against civilians, particularly the persecution of ethnic Vietnamese (who were accused of supporting the NVA/VC) and the repression of Khmer peasant villagers who rioted in support of Sihanouk, misguided policies that drove the latter into the arms of Pol Pot. In the remote areas of the country, notably in the highland regions, the FANK proved incapable of restraining the Khmer Rouge's fearsome intimidation campaigns that targeted the peasantry, let alone protecting them. After mid-1971, the Republican government focused on consolidating its hold over the key urban centers, the main garrisons and the lower Mekong-Bassac corridors, thus leaving most of the countryside virtually open to Khmer Rouge recruiting drives. Whilst during the 1967–68 operations waged against the Khmer Rouge's Revolutionary Army of Kampuchea (RAK) strongholds in Battambang Province Lon Nol could rely on the peasantry's loyalty to Prince Sihanouk, he was now alone. His deteriorating army, reduced to a garrison force confined to the main cities, was increasingly regarded as the military wing of the Phnom Penh regime rather than of the nation itself.

Facing them was the FUNK's armed wing, the Cambodian People's National Liberation Armed Forces (CPNLAF) which received arms and ammunition freely from the nation's porous borders. While the CPNLAF was far smaller, the FANK High Command was always faced with the problem of how to provide adequate equipment for the swelling number of volunteers who flocked to fight the NVA and the Khmer Rouge from their dwindling stocks. As the war progressed, weapons and ammunition, not to mention training grounds, became rarer, the FANK was unable to train in-country their new recruits, leaving it an army of raw conscripts and demoralized veterans. The FANK was already placed at a strategic disadvantage since May 1970, following the seizure of the northeastern areas of the country (the provinces of Stung Treng, Ratanakiri, Kratie, and Mondulkiri) by the NVA in response to the Lon Nol ultimatum and the loss to the Khmer Rouge of several peripheral eastern and southwestern Cambodian provinces (Kampot, Koh Kong, Kampong Cham, Preah Vihear, plus portions of Siem Reap, Oddar Meanchey, Kampong Thom, Prey Veng, and Svay Rieng Provinces) during that same year.

=== Collapse ===
In January 1975, coinciding with the North Vietnamese spring offensive that shattered the South's defences apart, the Khmer Rouge closed in on Phnom Penh, already overcrowded with 250,000 civilian refugees, and besieged it. President Lon Nol, FANK Commander-in-Chief Gen. Sosthene Fernandez and other Khmer Republic officials could not coordinate an effective resistance and at the same time feed the refugees and residents of Phnom Penh. On April 1, Marshal Lon Nol resigned from the Presidency and left the Country by plane to Thailand, although most of the senior civilian and military government officials decided to stay. Later on April 17, the armed forces’ Chief of the General Staff Lt. Gen. Sak Sutsakhan was evacuated together with his family and relatives of other officials by helicopter to Kampong Thom, thus effectively ending the FANK's existence as a coherent fighting force.

The last stand of the army of the ill-fated Khmer Republic in any form took place around Preah Vihear, a temple in the Dângrêk Mountains, close to the Thai border. Remnants of the FANK's 9th Brigade Group occupied the area for a few weeks in late April 1975, following the collapse of the Lon Nol regime. Even though their government had surrendered, FANK soldiers continued to fiercely hold their ground for nearly a month after the fall of Phnom Penh against several unsuccessful attempts by Khmer Rouge forces to reduce this last holdout. The Khmer Rouge finally succeeded on May 22, after shelling the hill where the temple stands, scaling it, and routing the defenders, as Thai officials reported at the time.

== Command structure ==
=== Regional commands ===
Prior to the War, Cambodia was divided into seven military districts termed 'Military Regions' (MR, French: Régions Militaires) encompassing one to ten military sub-districts (French: Subdivisions) of unequal size roughly corresponding to the areas of the country's 23 provinces and districts. They were organized since September 1969 as follows:

- First Military Region (French: Région Militaire 1) – headquartered at Kampong Cham, capital of Kampong Cham Province, the MR 1 covered the Kampong Cham, Prey Veng, and Svay Rieng military sub-districts.
- Second Military Region (French: Région Militaire 2) – headquartered at Kampong Speu, capital of Kompong Speu Province, the MR 2 covered the Kampong Speu, Kampot, Takéo, Srakar Neak, Kampong Seila, Thmar Keo, Kirirom, Kep-Bokor, and Koh Kong military sub-districts.
- Third Military Region (French: Région Militaire 3) – headquartered at Battambang, capital of Battambang Province, the MR 3 covered the Battambang, Pursat, Thmar Pouk, Stung Meanchey, and Kampong Chhnang military sub-districts.
- Fourth Military Region (French: Région Militaire 4) – headquartered at Siem Reap, capital of Siem Reap Province, the MR 4 covered the Siem Reap, Kampong Thom, Preah Vihear, Oddar Meanchey, and Angkor Chum military sub-districts.
- Fifth Military Region (French: Région Militaire 5) – headquartered at Stung Treng, capital of Stung Treng Province, the MR 5 covered the Stung Treng and Ratanakiri military sub-districts.
- Sixth Military Region (French: Région Militaire 6) – headquartered at Kratié, capital of Kratié Province, the MR 6 covered the Kratie and Mondulkiri military sub-districts.
- Phnom Penh Special Military Zone (PPSMZ, French: Région Militaire Spéciale de Phnom Penh – RMSPP) – headquartered at Phnom Penh, it covered the National Capital zone and its environs, the Udong Meanchey and Kandal military sub-districts.

The 6th MR and its regional HQ at Kratie were lost permanently upon the desertion of the local Cambodian garrison troops to the enemy soon after the beginning of hostilities. A special military zone for the lower Mekong River, designated the Special Mekong Zone – SMZ or 12th Tactical Zone (French: Zone Spéciale du Mekong – ZSM; Zone Tactique 12) was established in mid-1971 at Kandal Province, situated between the Cambodian Capital and the South Vietnamese border. Two additional military regions (8th MR and 9th MR) were created in 1973.

== Branches ==
The FANK's predecessor was first established on November 9, 1953, under the terms of a French-Khmer convention and initially received the designation of Cambodian National Armed Forces (French: Forces Armées Nationales Cambodgiennes – FANC), changed in 1955 to Royal Khmer Armed Forces (French: Forces Armées Royales Khmères – FARK). By the late 1950s, the FARK consisted of ground, air and naval branches of service, respectively the Royal Khmer Army (French: Armée Royale Khmère – ARK), the Royal Khmer Aviation (French: Aviation Royale Khmère – AVRK), and the Royal Khmer Navy (French: Marine Royale Khmère – MRK). Their roles were defined as follows: to guarantee the sovereignty of the nation and that of the King; to ensure internal security by maintaining the social order and the rule of law; and to defend the newly independent Kingdom of Cambodia from external threats. Upon Lon Nol's coup in March 1970, the Cambodian military establishment was renamed FANK, thus becoming the official armed forces of the new regime, the Khmer Republic. The roles defined for the reorganized FANK were essentially the same as before, except that now they had to defend the sovereignty of the Republican Government and not of the deposed Prince, and drive out all the NVA/VC forces from eastern Cambodia. The FANK comprised the following branches:

- Khmer National Army (French: Armée nationale khmère, ANK)
- Khmer Air Force (French: Armée de l’air khmère, AAK)
- Khmer National Navy (French: Marine nationale khmère, MNK)

== Elite forces ==
- Cambodian Airborne Brigade
- Cambodian Para-Commando Battalion
- Khmer Special Forces
- Lake Brigade
- Cambodian Marine Corps (French: Corps de Fusiliers-Marins Khmères)
- Cambodian Navy SEALs

== Training facilities ==
With the increase in activity at Pochentong airbase, the Air Force Academy (French: École de l'Air; formerly, the Royal Flying School) was moved in August 1970 to more quieter and less congested facilities at Battambang airfield close to the city of Battambang, the capital of the namesake province in northwestern Cambodia.

The Officer Candidate School was moved from Phnom Penh to Longvek in Kampong Chhnang Province, just north of Oudong. New infantry training centres were built at Kandal, Kampong Speu, Ream, Sisophon, and Longvek whilst an additional Recondo School run by the Khmer Special Forces was opened near Battambang in November 1972 to train Long-range reconnaissance patrol (LRRP) teams.

To train Khmer National Navy officer cadets, a Naval Academy (French: École des Officiers de Marine) was established at Chrui Chhangwar Naval Base in late 1971, and an Enlisted Man Training Center (French: Centre d'Instruction), which provided specialized courses for junior ranks was set up one Kilometer south of the Cambodian Capital.

An Air-Ground Operations School – AGOS (French: École des opérations air-sol – EOAS) was opened in May 1973 by the Khmer Air Force to train forward air guides (FAGs) for the Army.

== Foreign assistance ==
Soon after its creation in 1970, the Khmer Republic requested and received military assistance from the United States, South Vietnam, the Kingdom of Laos, Thailand, Indonesia, the Philippines, Singapore, the Republic of China (Taiwan), Australia and New Zealand. American military aid was funnelled to the FANK through the Military Equipment Delivery Team, Cambodia (MEDTC) program. Authorized a total of 113 officers and men, the team arrived in Phnom Penh in 1971, under the overall command of CINCPAC Admiral John S. McCain Jr.

To upgrade FANK capabilities, a regimented training programme began in early 1971 in South Vietnam under American auspices. Between February 1971 and November 1972, training centers run by the US Army-Vietnam Individual Training Program (UITG) were set up at the former MIKE Force base camps of Long Hải, Phuc Tuy, and Chi Lang to re-train Cambodian Army, KAF airfield security and MNK Naval Infantry troops in basic light infantry, armour, artillery, and marine tactics.

More specialized training was also provided to selected FANK personnel. Paratroops' tactical courses were held at the Australian-operated Van Kiep LRRP Training Center, and at the Army of the Republic of Vietnam (ARVN) Airborne Training Centers of Long Thanh and Tan Son Nhut Air Base, near Saigon; some 60 Cambodian students were later sent to Indonesia to attend the Para-Commando course at the Batujajar Airborne Commando School, near Bandung in West Java. Special Forces' (SF) courses were undertaken at the LLDB Training Center at Dong Ba Thin Base Camp near Cam Ranh Bay, South Vietnam, but also in Thailand, at the Royal Thai Army (RTA) Special Warfare Center at Fort Narai, Lopburi province, while Guerrilla and Commando techniques were taught by the Royal Thai Police (RTP) Police Aerial Reinforcement Unit (PARU) at their Phitsanulok and Hua Hin training camps. Ranger/LRRP courses were conducted at the American-operated Military Assistance Command Vietnam (MACV) Recondo School at Nha Trang, South Vietnam, and at the RTA Recondo School co-located at Ft. Narai, Thailand. Additional SF and SEAL training was undertaken respectively at Fort Bragg, North Carolina and the Naval Amphibious Base Coronado in San Diego, California in the United States, and at Subic Bay Naval Base in the Philippines.

Chinese instructor pilots from Taiwan were posted on loan at the KAF Battambang Air Academy to train its pilots whereas Khmer cadets and air crews were sent for L-19, 0-1, UH-1, T-28, AC-47, EC-47, AU-24, and C-123 training to South Vietnam, Thailand, and the United States. Most of the advanced courses and specialized training of Khmer combat pilots was conducted by Thai instructors at the RTAF Kamphaeng Saen Flight Training School in Nakhon Pathom Province and by American advisors of Detachment 1, 56th Special Operations Wing at Udorn, U-Tapao and Takhli airbases in Thailand, while others were dispatched to attend observer courses at Bien Hoa Air Base, South Vietnam. A small number of student pilots also went to train with the U.S. Navy at the Naval Air Station Pensacola, Florida, while others were sent to the USAF Air University, Maxwell Air Force Base in Montgomery, Alabama, and four student pilots attended courses at the Royal Australian Air Force (RAAF) East Sale Airbase in Victoria, Australia.

An input of fourteen Cambodian naval officers were sent to the United States to attend advanced courses at various US naval training institutions. Some eight students attended the US Naval Academy (USNA) at Annapolis, Maryland, whilst two senior officers went to the Naval War College (NWC) in Newport, Rhode Island and the Navy Supply Corps School (NSCS) in Athens, Georgia; four other students attended the small boat tactics school at the Mare Island Naval Shipyard (MINSY) and the adjacent Naval Inshore Operations Center at Vallejo, California.

== See also ==
- Cambodian Civil War
- First Indochina War
- Kampuchea Revolutionary Army
- Kampuchean People's Revolutionary Armed Forces
- List of weapons of the Cambodian Civil War
- Republic of Vietnam Military Forces
- Royal Cambodian Armed Forces
- Royal Gendarmerie (Cambodia)
- Royal Lao Armed Forces
- Vietnam War
