= Stoung District =

Stoung ស្រុកស្ទោង
- District (srok)
- Location in Cambodia
- Coordinates: 12°50′N 104°35′E
- Country: Cambodia
- Province: Kampong Thom
- Time zone: +7
- Geocode: 0608

Stoung is a district within Kampong Thom Province, in central Cambodia. According to the 1998 census of Cambodia, it had a population of 94,119.

== Administration ==
The following table shows the villages of Sandaan District by commune.

Khum (Communes)	Phum (Villages)
Banteay Stoung	Ponlea Chey, Chanloh, Beng, Banteay Stoung, Kok Kruos, Kouk Sandaek, Chheu Teal, Pou, Sla Kar, Chambak Panhnha, Bar Veaeng, Roluos, Ta Maeu, Sraom Daek, Doun Pok
Chamna Kraom	Preah Neangkoal, Sampoar, Srei Rongit, Svay Ie, Neang Noy, Sandan, Spean Krong, Chi Ab, Chamnak, Lieb
Chamna Leu	Srang, Prasat, Trapeang Choar, Khmak, Kor, Lhong, Andoung Trom, Thlok, K'en, Phlaoch
Kampong Chen Cheung	Tnaot, Chek, Chak, Roka, Neang Sa Lngeach, Trach,
Kampong Chen Tboung	Chheu Teal, Leab Tong, Kampong Kdei, Kampong Chen, Chi Youk, Svay Sa, Nguon Siem
Msa Krang	Ou Doung, Sambuor Tboung, Sambuor Cheung, Kouk Trea, Msa Krang Tboung, Msa Krang Cheung, Kampong Pradam, Bat Trang, Prakeab, Chi Meas, Sampan
Peam Bang	Pov Veuy, Peam Bang, Doun Sderng
Popok	Sambuor, Anlong Kranh, Kaoh Samraong, Krasang, Khtom Mon, Popok, Phteah Daeum, Trapeang Ruessei
Pralay	Ang Khloam, Kampong Veang, Prey Khla, Pralay, Kouk Rovieng, Anlong Pring, Kampreal, Kanthean, Neang Sa Lngeach, Thmei, Kraek, Chhuk, Ta Treal, Srae Ta Maen
Preah Damrei	Siem Peay, Cheah, Souphi, Luek, Kandaol Chas, Kandaol Thmei, Prasat, Samrang, Roluos
Rung Roeang	Bos Ta Saom, Kantong Rong, Prum Srei, Svay Rieng, Botum Lech, Botum Kaeut, Kantaeub, Pou, Kdei Char
Samprouch	Krasang Chrum Tboung, Krasang Chrum Cheung, Tnaot Kom, Samprouch, Kouk Snay, Pey, Chambak Khpos, Trach Chrum, Pophluk, Ampil, Mochheay, Doun L'a, Pradet, Lvea, Ou Rumchek, Ampov Prey, Slak Kranh
Trea	Totea, Kaoh, Hab, Veal, Sam K'aok, Chrang Sa, Trea, Bos Ta Aek, Ta Char, Leab Tong, Phteah Veal, Sla, Krasang, Koch Tituy, Popeay, Tumpech
