= Kampong Thom province =

Province of Cambodia

Kampong Thom Province ខេត្តកំពង់ធំ
- Province

Khmer transcription(s)
  - Khmer: ខេត្តកំពង់ធំ
  - UNGEGN: Khaet Kǎmpǒng Thǒm
  - ALA-LC: Khett Kaṃbáng Dhaṃ
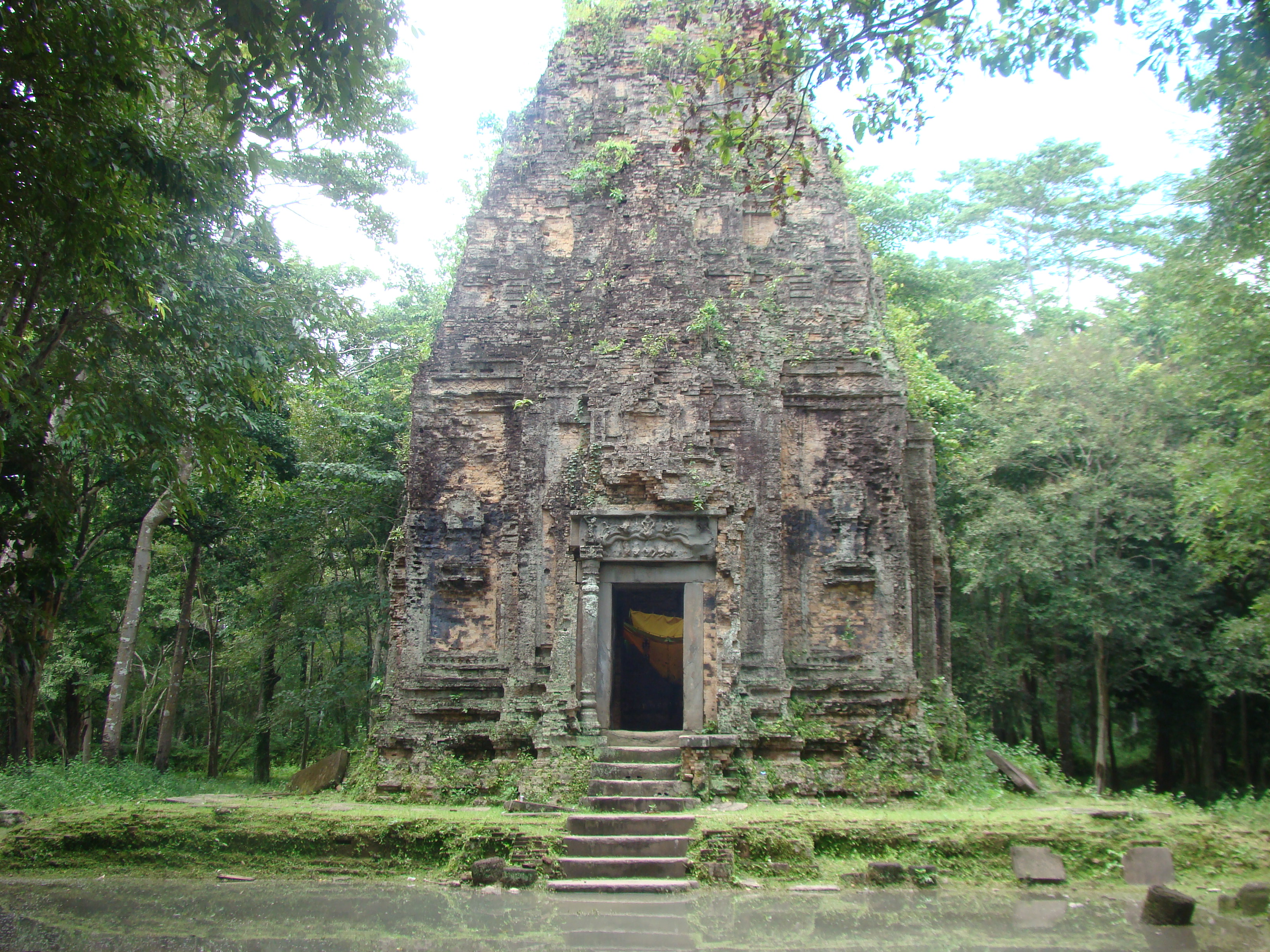
- Sambor Prei Kuk, a UNESCO World Heritage Site and the symbol of the province

- Seal

- Map of Cambodia highlighting Kampong Thom
- Coordinates: 12°42′N 104°53′E
- Country: Cambodia
- Provincial status: 1907
- Capital: Stung Saen
- Subdivisions: 1 municipality; 8 districts

Government
  - Governor: Noun Pharath (CPP)
  - National Assembly: 6 / 125

Area
  - Total: 13,814 km^{2} (5,334 sq mi)
  - Rank: 2nd

Population (2024)
  - Total: ▲807,254
  - Rank: 11th
  - Density: 49/km^{2} (130/sq mi)
  - Rank: 17th
- Time zone: UTC+07:00 (ICT)
- Dialing code: +855
- ISO 3166 code: KH-6
- Website: www.kampongthom.gov.kh

Kampong Thom Province (Khmer: ខេត្តកំពង់ធំ, Khaet Kǎmpǒng Thǒm, [kɑm.pɔŋ tʰom]; lit. 'grand port') is a province of Cambodia. It borders the provinces of Siem Reap to the northwest, Preah Vihear to the north, Stung Treng to the northeast, Kratie to the east, Kampong Cham and Kampong Chhnang to the south, and the Tonle Sap to the west.

The provincial capital is Stung Saen, a town of approximately 30,000 people on the banks of the Stung Sen River.

Kampong Thom is Cambodia's second largest province by area. There are a number of significant Angkorian sites in the area, including Prasat Sambor Prei Kuk and Prasat Andat temples. As one of the nine provinces bordering Tonle Sap Lake, Kampong Thom is part of the Tonlé Sap Biosphere Reserve.

== Administration ==
The province is divided into eight districts and one municipality, further divided into 81 communes.

ISO code	District	Khmer	Population (2019)
06-01	Baray	ស្រុកបារាយណ៍	104,032
06-02	Kampong Svay	ស្រុកកំពង់ស្វាយ	90,271
06-03	Steung Saen Municipality	ក្រុងស្ទឹងសែន	53,118
06-04	Prasat Balangk	ស្រុកប្រាសាទបល្ល័ង្ក	47,888
06-05	Prasat Sambour	ស្រុកប្រាសាទសំបូរ	43,390
06-06	Sandaan	ស្រុកសណ្ដាន់	62,013
06-07	Santuk	ស្រុកសន្ទុក	101,428
06-08	Stoung	ស្រុកស្ទោង	108,372
06-09	Taing Kouk	ស្រុកតាំងគោក	64,888

== History ==
The previous name of the province was Kampong Pous Thom ('Port', 'City of the Great Snakes'). According to local legend, at a lakeside dock near the Sen River, a pair of large snakes inhabited a nearby cave. On every Buddhist holiday, the snakes would make appearances to the people nearby who then began to refer to the area as Kampong Pous Thom. Eventually the snakes disappeared and the name was shortened to Kampong Thom. During the Colonial Cambodia period, the French divided Cambodian territory into provinces and named most of them according to the local popular names for the respective areas.

Kampong Thom was a powerful capital in Southeast Asia during the Funan period. Prasat Sambor Prei Kuk, dating from the Chenla era, is in Kampong Thom province.

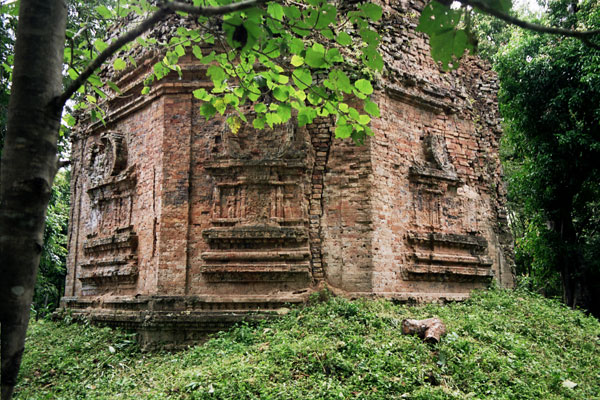
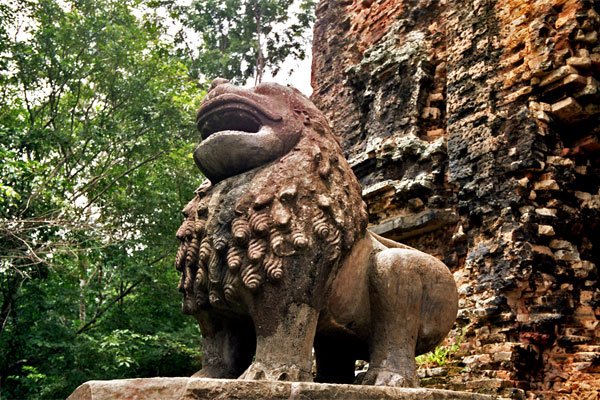
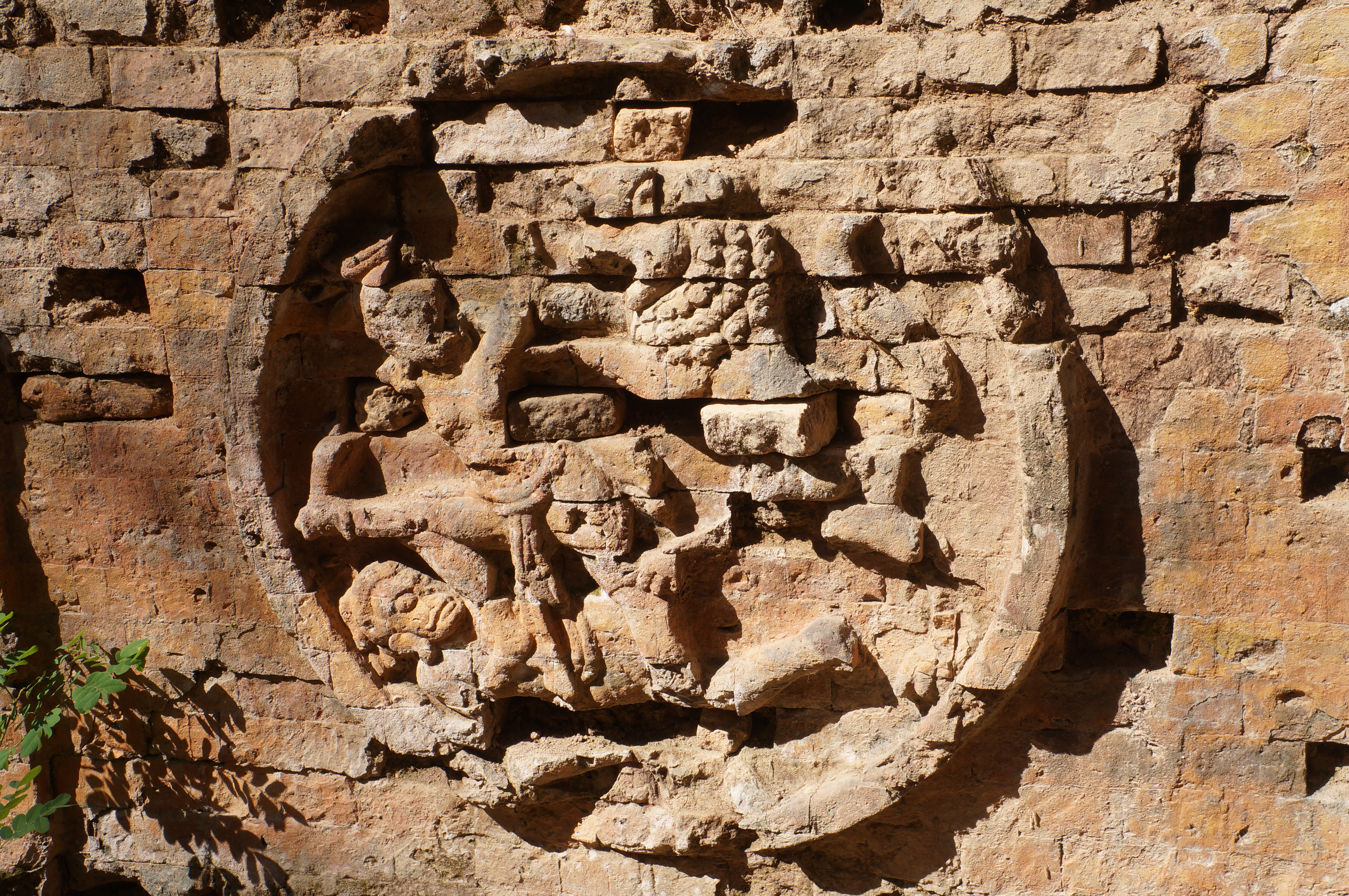
The ancient temple complex of Sambor Prei Kuk in northern Kampong Thom.

== Geography ==
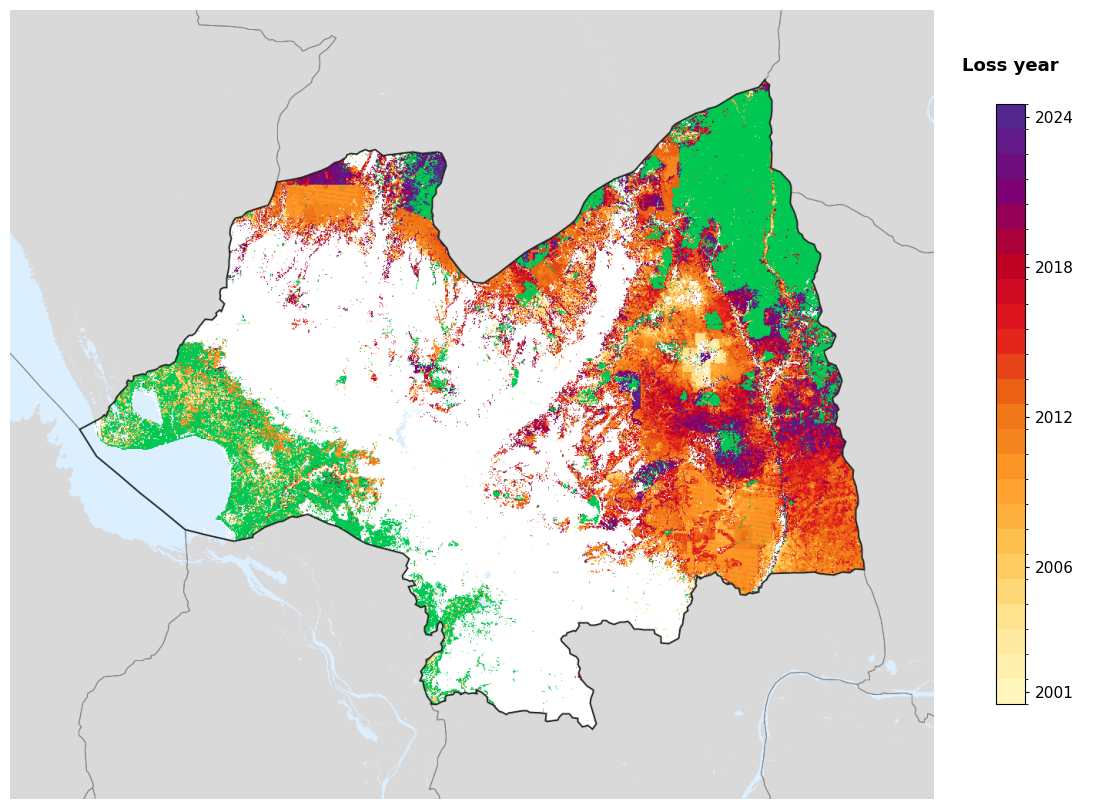
Tree-cover loss year in Kampong Thom, 2001-2024, from the Global Forest Change dataset.

The Prey Lang Wildlife Sanctuary landscape spans Kampong Thom and neighbouring provinces, and has included a registered REDD+ project under Japan’s Joint Crediting Mechanism for which Conservation International Cambodia has been described as a coordinator.

Two of the three core areas in Tonlé Sap Biosphere Reserve lie in Kampong Thom.

- Boeng Chhmar (14,560 hectares), and
- Stung Saen (6,355 hectares).

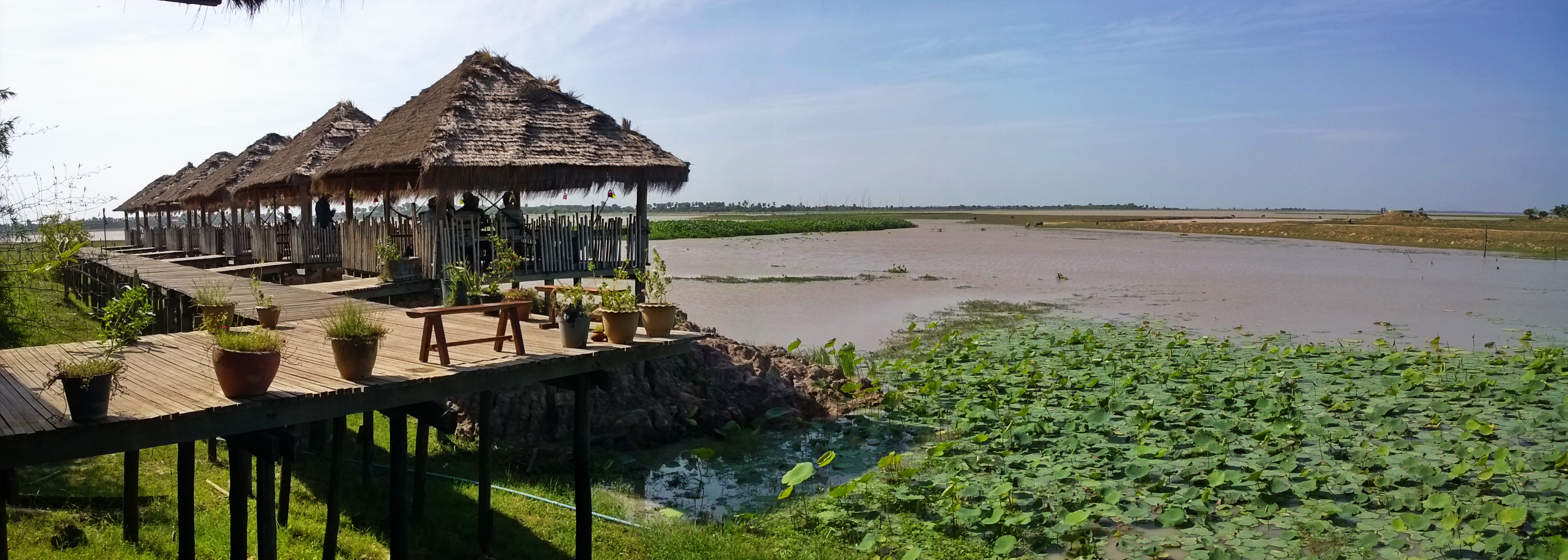
Prey Pras, Kampong Thom

== Religion ==
Religion in Kampong Thom (2019 census)
1. Buddhism (98.6%)
2. Islam (1.00%)
3. Christianity (0.30%)
4. Animism and Other religions (0.00%)

The state religion is Theravada Buddhism. More than 98.6% of the people in Kampong Thom are Buddhists. Chams have been practicing Islam for hundreds of years, besides that there are Cham Muslims from Tboung Khmum who came here recently to encroach on the forest land here.

== Economy ==
Much of Kampong Thom is on the floodplain of the Tonlé Sap lake. In 2003–2004, it was a significant producer of wild fish (18,800 tons) and the fourth largest producer of fish through aquaculture in Cambodia (1,800 tons). Most of the fish-raising is done by home production, with a growing segment devoted to rice field aquaculture.

Kampong Thom is also one of the largest producers of cashew nuts in Cambodia, with 6,371 hectares under production in 2003–2004.

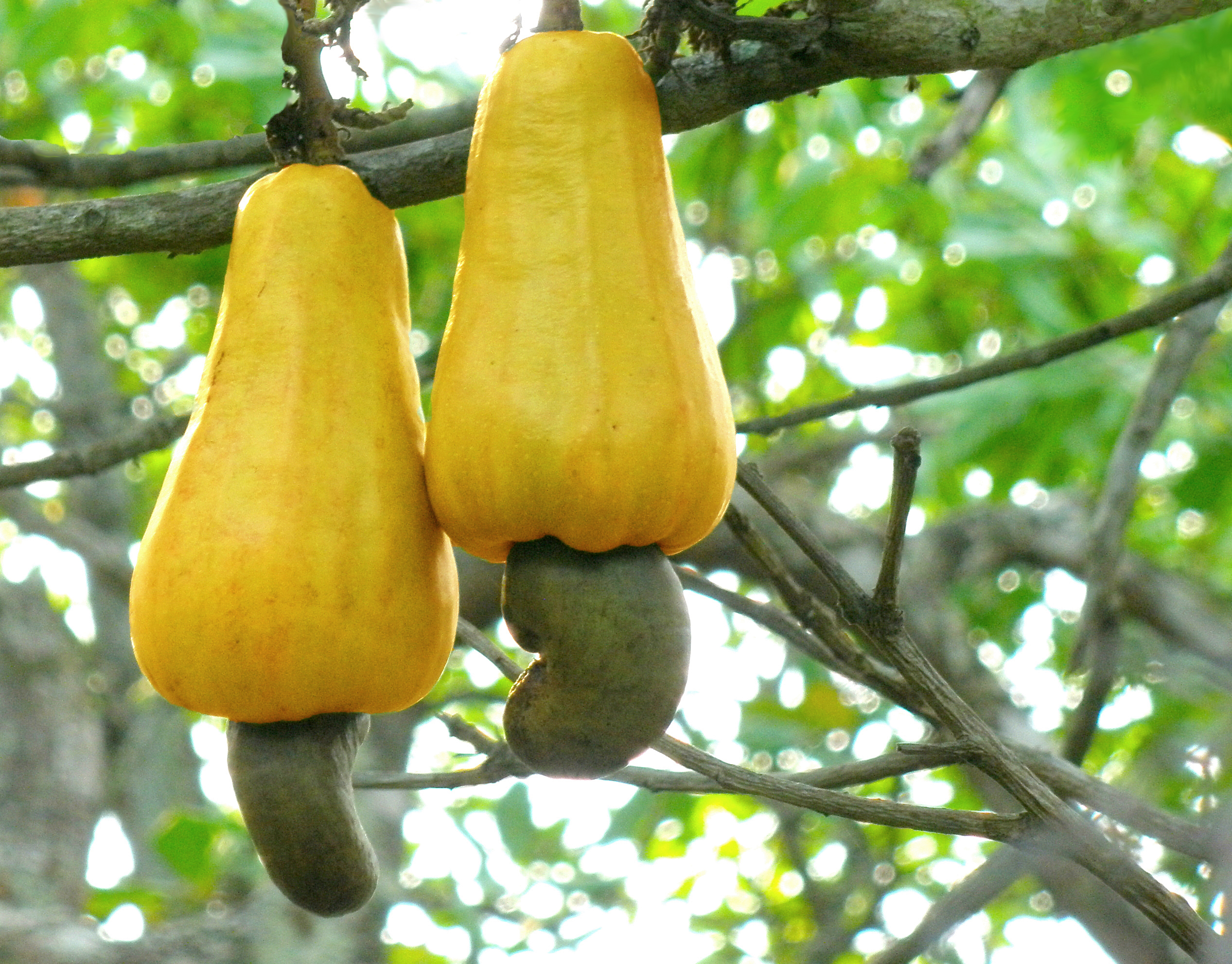
The province is one of the largest producer of cashews in the country.

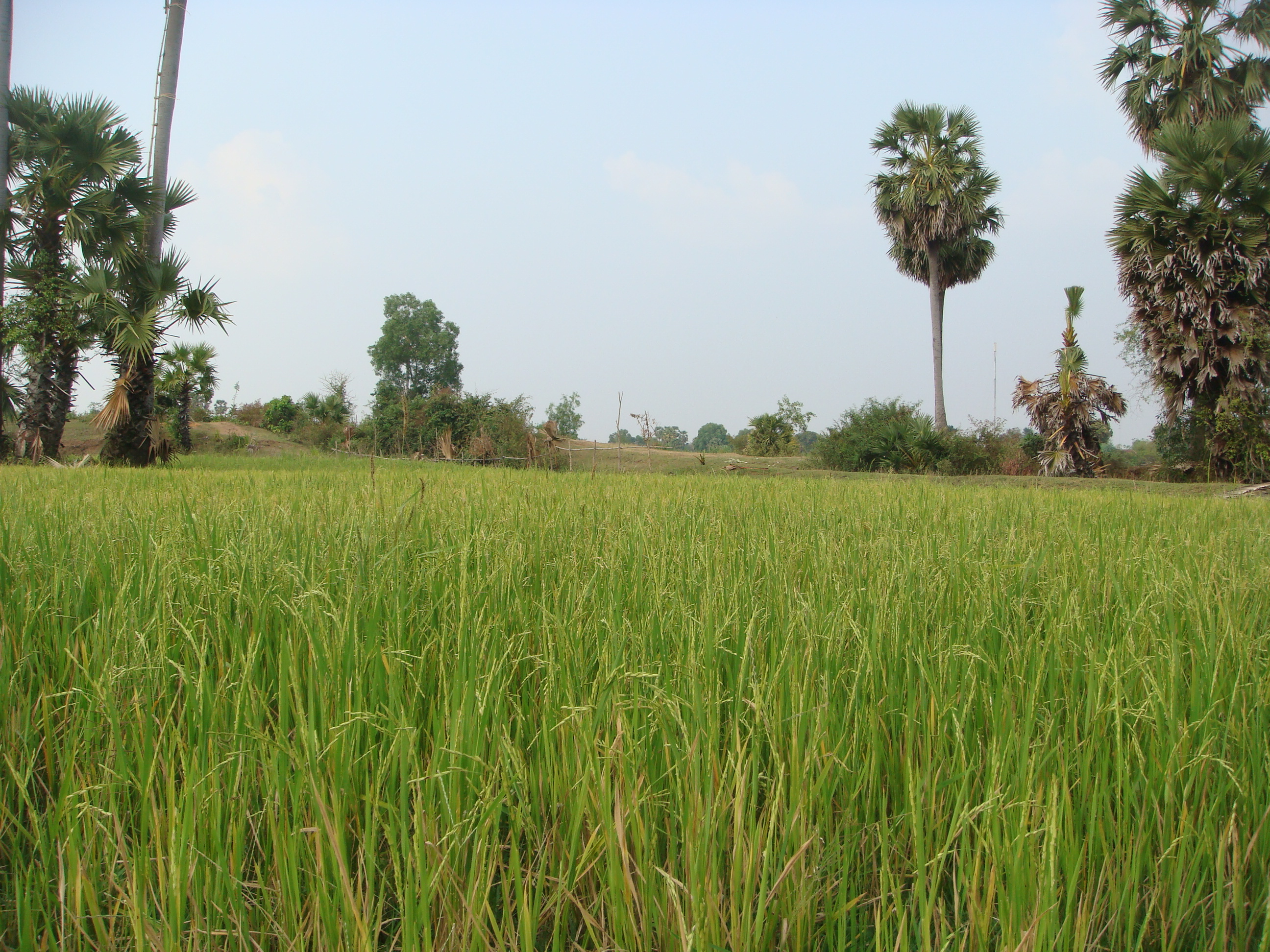
Rice paddies in Baray District.

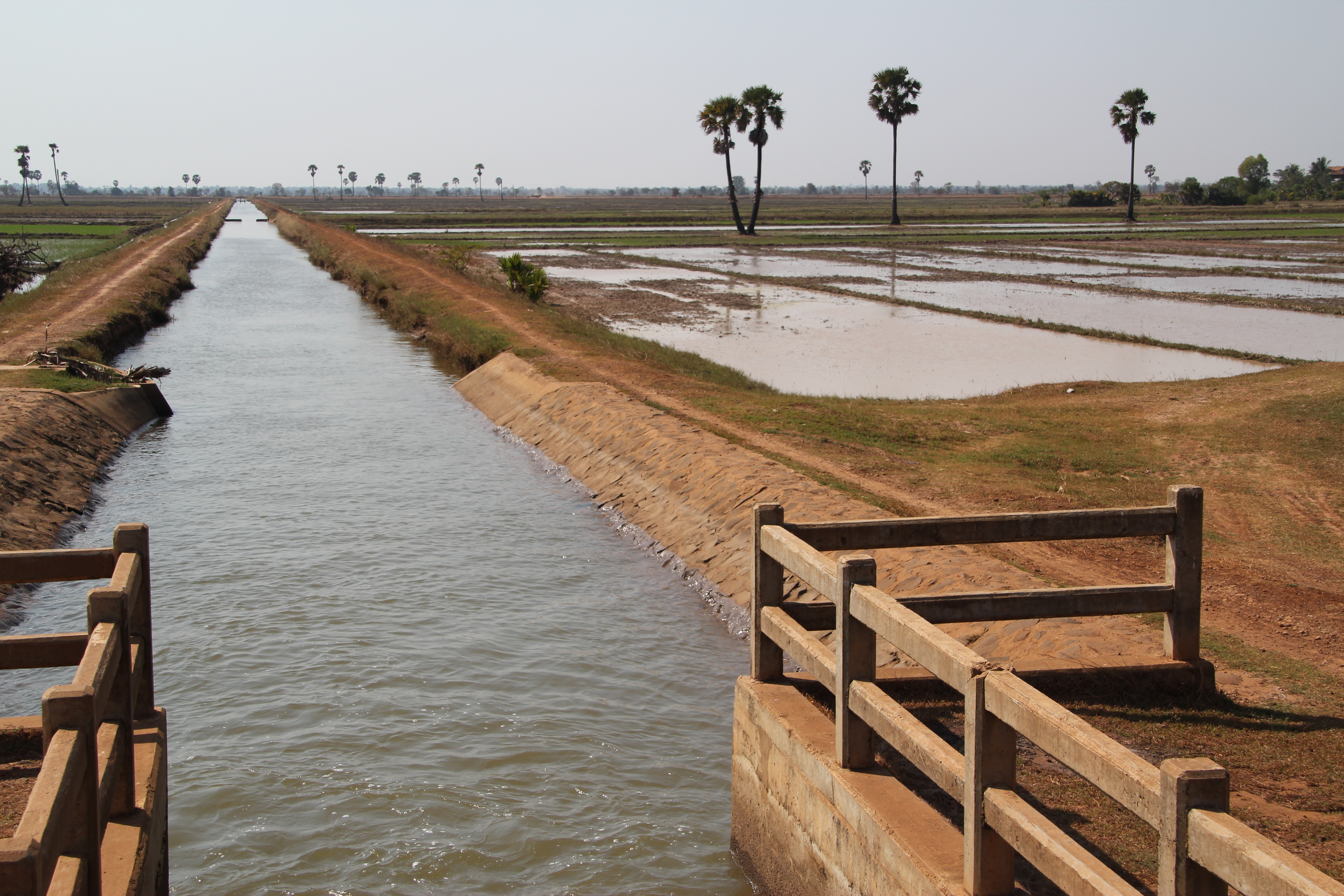
Irrigation canals and farmlands
