= Khmer Air Force =

Air force of the Khmer Republic (1970–1975)

- ទ័ពអាកាសខ្មែរ; Armée de l'air khmère
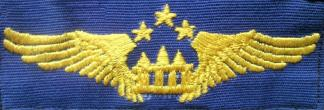
- Khmer Air Force emblem (1970–1975)
- Active: 22 April 1954 – March 1970 as the Royal Khmer Aviation; 8 June 1971 – 17 April 1975 as the Khmer Air Force
- Country: First Kingdom of Cambodia; Khmer Republic (Cambodia)
- Allegiance: 1st Kingdom of Cambodia (1954-1970); Khmer Republic (1970-1975)
- Type: Air force
- Role: Aerial warfare Close air support Counter-insurgency; Airdrop
- Size: 10,000 personnel (at height); 309 aircraft (at height)
- Part of: Royal Khmer Armed Forces (1954-1970); Khmer National Armed Forces (1970-1975)
- Headquarters: Pochentong Air Base, Phnom Penh
- Nickname: KAF (AAK in French)
- Colors: Blue, red
- Anniversaries: 22 April – AVRK Day; 8 June – KAF Day
- Engagements: Cambodian Civil War; Vietnam War

Commanders
- Notable commanders: So Satto; Penn Randa; Ea Chhong

Insignia
- Roundel

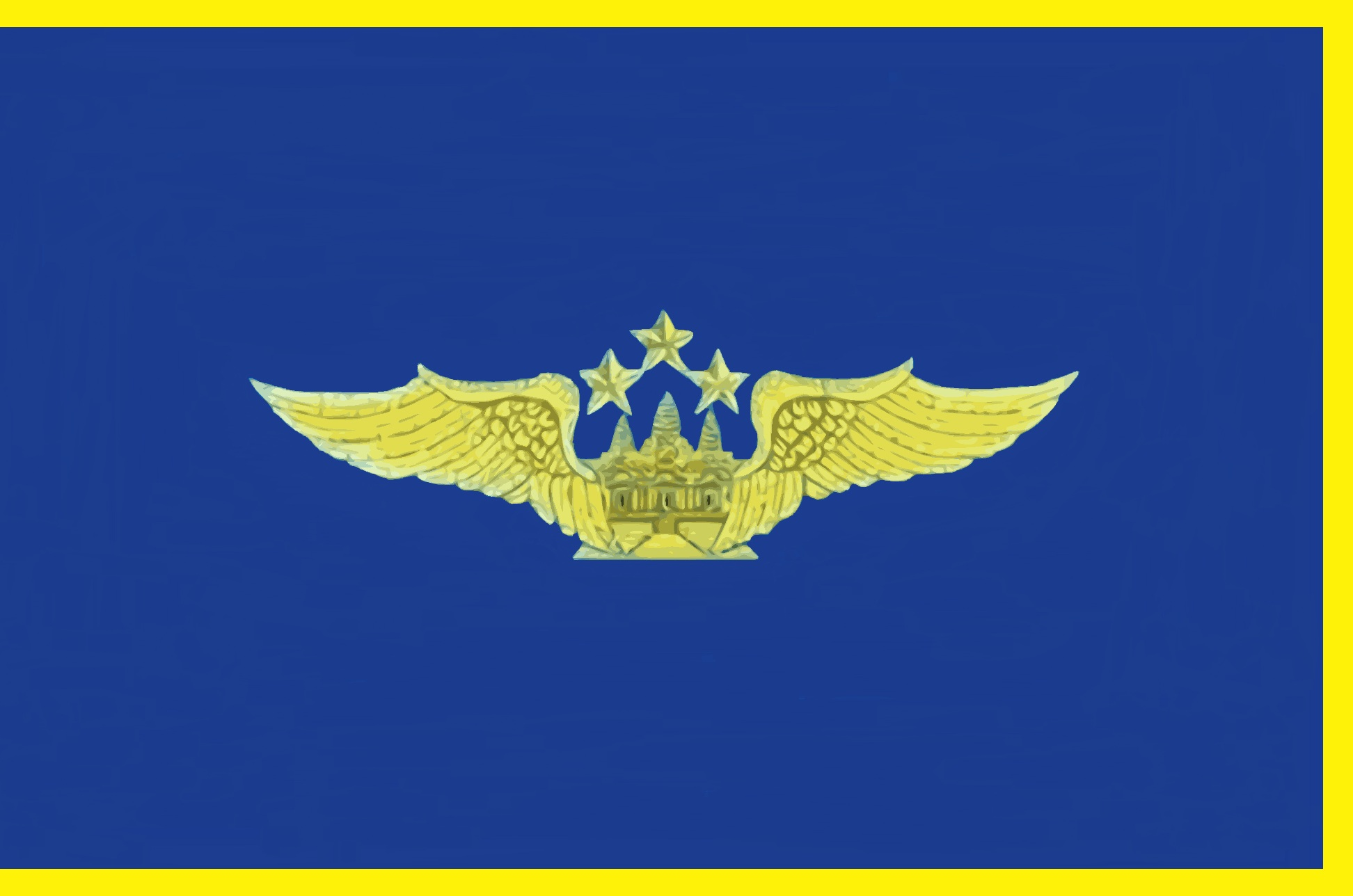
- Ensign

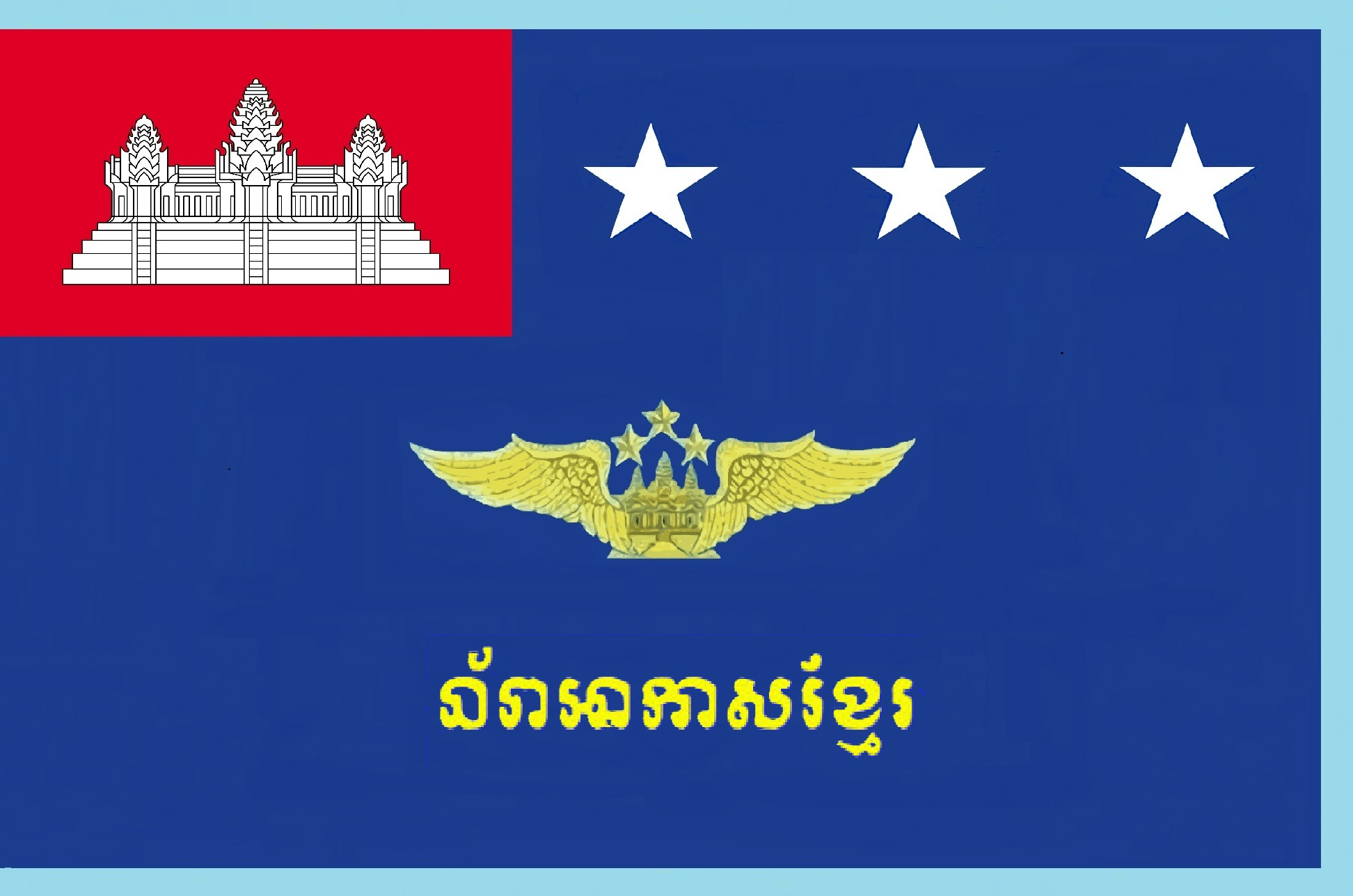
- Ceremonial Colour

Aircraft flown
- Attack: Fouga Magister, T-6G, T-28D, AD-4N Skyraider, T-37, AU-24, AC-47, FD-25
- Electronic warfare: EC-47D
- Fighter: J-5, MiG-17
- Reconnaissance: MS 500 Criquet, O-1 Bird Dog, U-6 (L-20), U-17
- Trainer: T-6G, T-28B, T-41, MS 733 Alcyon, Nanchang BT-6/PT-6, Yak-18 Max, Socata Horizon, MiG-15UTI, FT-5, Fouga Magister, T-37, FD-25B
- Transport: Cessna 170, Cessna 180, Dassault MD 315 Flamant, UTVA-60, An-2, Il-14, C-47, Douglas C-54B, Curtiss C-46F, C-123K, Alouette II, Alouette III, H-19, H-34, UH-1, Mi-4

The Khmer Air Force (Khmer: ទ័ពអាកាសខ្មែរ; French: Armée de l'air khmère; AAK), commonly known by its americanized acronym KAF, was the air force component of the Khmer National Armed Forces (FANK), the official military of the Khmer Republic during the Cambodian Civil War between 1970 and 1975.

== History ==
Although an air wing for the fledgling Khmer Royal Army (ARK) was first planned in 1952, it wasn't until April 22, 1954, however, that the Royal Khmer Aviation (Aviation royale khmère; AVRK) was officially commissioned by a Royal decree from the Cambodian Head of State, Prince Norodom Sihanouk. Commanded by Prince Sihanouk's personal physician, Colonel Dr. Ngo Hou, and known sarcastically as the "Royal Flying Club", the AVRK initially operated a small fleet of four Morane-Saulnier MS 500 Criquet liaison aircraft, two Cessna 180 Skywagon light utility aircraft, one Cessna 170 light personal aircraft, and one Douglas DC-3 modified for VIP transport. At this stage, the AVRK was not yet an independent service; since its earlier personnel cadre was drawn from the Engineer Corps, the Ministry of Defense placed the AVRK under the administrative control of the Army Engineer's Inspector-General Department. The first flight training courses in-country were initiated in October 1954 by French instructors seconded from the airforce component of the French Far East Expeditionary Corps (CEFEO) at the newly founded Royal Flying School (École de l'Air Royale) in Pochentong airfield near Phnom Penh, though Khmer pilot students (Élèves pilotes Khmers – EPKs) were later sent to the École de l'air at Salon-de-Provence in France.

=== Early expansion phase 1955–63 ===
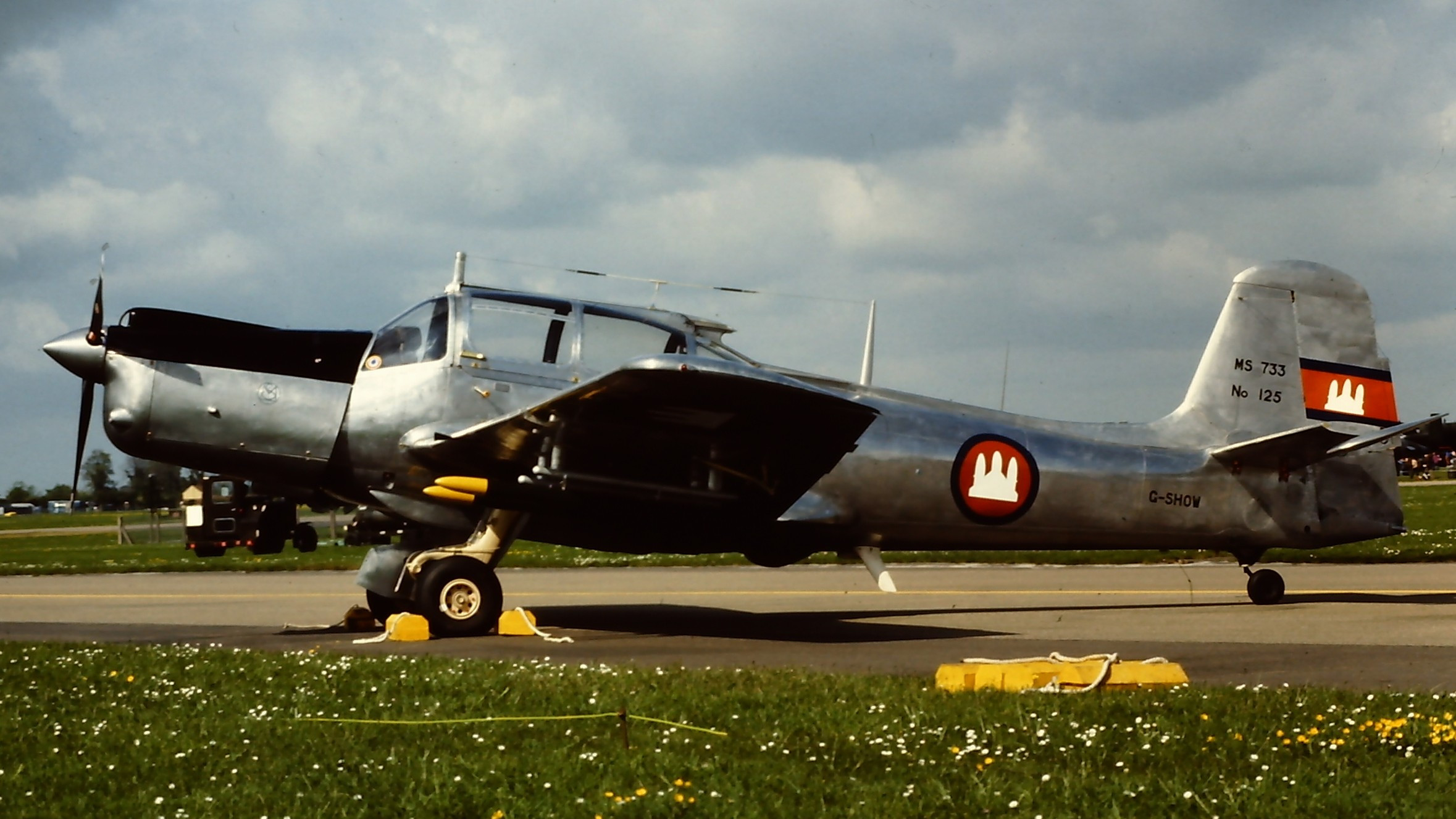
A French-built MS.733 in Royal Khmer Aviation (AVRK) markings.

During the first years of its existence, the AVRK received assistance from France – which under the terms of the November 1953 treaty of independence had the right to keep a military mission in Cambodia –, the United States, Japan, Israel, and West Germany, who provided training programs, technical aid, and additional aircraft. The French delivered in 1954–55 fifteen Morane-Saulnier MS 733 Alcyon three-seat basic trainers, and Japan delivered three Fletcher FD-25 Defender single-seater ground-attack aircraft and three Fletcher FD-25B two-seat trainers, whilst deliveries by the United States Military Assistance Advisory Group (U.S. MAAG) aid program – established since June 1955 at Phnom Penh – of fourteen North American T-6G Texan trainers, eight Cessna L-19A Bird Dog observation aircraft, three de Havilland Canada DHC L-20 Beaver liaison aircraft, seven Douglas C-47 Skytrain transports (soon joined by with two additional C-47 transports bought from Israel) and six Curtiss C-46F Commando transports allowed the AVRK to acquire a limited light strike capability, as well as improving its own reconnaissance and transportation capabilities. A small Helicopter force also began to take shape, with the delivery in 1958–59 of three Sikorsky H-34 Choctaws by the US MAAG, followed in 1960 of two Sud Aviation SA 313B Alouette II by the French and of two Sikorsky H-19 Chickasaws by the Americans in 1963. Although Cambodia was theoretically forbidden of having fighter jets under the terms of the July 1955 Geneva Accords, the AVRK did receive its first jet trainers in September 1961 from France, in the form of four Potez CM.170R Fouga Magisters modified locally in 1962 to accept a pair of AN/M2 7,62mm aircraft guns and under-wing rocket rails. By the end of the year, the AVRK aligned 83 airframes of American, Canadian and French origin, though mostly were World War II-vintage obsolescent types well past their prime – U.S. MAAG advisors often described the AVRK at the time as an "aerial museum" – and training accidents were far from uncommon, due to Col. Ngo Hou's insistence on using the T-6G Texans for flight instruction.

The baptism of fire of the AVRK came the following year when its FD-25 Defenders and T-6G Texan armed trainers supported Khmer Royal Army troops in Takéo Province fighting a cross-border incursion by Vietnamese militiamen from the Hòa Hảo militant sect fleeing persecution from the neighbouring Republic of Vietnam. The obsolete Texans and Defenders were eventually replaced in August that year by sixteen North American T-28D Trojan trainers converted to the fighter-bomber role. Also under the U.S. MAAG program, the AVRK received in March 1963 four Cessna T-37B Tweet jet trainers; however, unlike the Fougas provided earlier by the French, these airframes had no provision for weapon systems, since the Americans resisted Cambodian requests to arm them.

=== Early structure and organization ===
The main tactical air elements of the AVRK by mid-1956 were a training squadron, a transport and liaison squadron and the 1st intervention (or combat) squadron, all based at Pochentong airfield. As the AVRK expanded its flight and technical branch services, in 1958 the Air Force Command re-organized them more systematically into air wings or "Groups" (Groupements) based on the French Air Force model – the Territorial Group (Groupement Territoriale) which handled administrative tasks, the Technical Group (Groupement Téchnique) for the maintenance of aircraft and other equipments and the Tactical Air Group (Groupement Aérien Tactique – GATAC). This later formation aligned three squadron-sized flight units:

- A reconnaissance squadron, the 1st Observation and Combat Accompanying Group (1ér Groupe d'Observation et d'Accompagnement au Combat – 1ér GAOAC);
- A combat and ground support squadron, the Intervention Group (Groupe d'Intervention – GI);
- A transportation squadron, the Liaison and Transport Group (Groupe d'Liaison et Transport – GLT).

The Technical Group aligned the AVRK's support and technical branches, which comprised the Communications (Communications), Civil engineers and Construction (Génie de l'Air/Construction), Flight engineers (Mécaniciens Navigantes), Medical (Service de Santé, or simply Santé), Transportation (Train or Transport), and Military Fuel/Petrol, Oil and Lubricants – POL (Service de Essence) services.

=== The neutrality years 1964–1970 ===
In response to the coup against President Ngô Đình Diệm in South Vietnam, Prince Sihanouk cancelled on November 20, 1963, all American aid, and on January 15, 1964, the US MAAG program was suspended when Cambodia adopted a neutrality policy, so the AVRK continued to rely on French military assistance but at the same time turned to Australia, Yugoslavia, the Soviet Union and China for aircraft and training. Already in 1961, Khmer student pilots returning from previous training stints in France had been sent to the USSR for conversion training in Soviet fighter jet types, and in November 1963 the Soviets delivered an initial batch of three MiG-17F fighter jets, one MiG-15UTI jet trainer and one Yakovlev Yak-18 Max light trainer. France continued to deliver aircraft to Cambodia in 1964–65, supplying sixteen night attack Douglas AD-4N Skyraiders and six Dassault MD 315R Flamant light transports, soon followed by more Alouette II and Sud Aviation SA-316B Alouette III light helicopters and ten Gardan GY-80 Horizon light trainers, which replaced the obsolete MS 733 Alcyons. The Yugoslavians provided at the time four UTVA-60AT1 utility transports, whilst the USSR delivered two Ilyushin Il-14 and eight Antonov An-2 Colt transports, and China sent one Chinese-built FT-5 jet trainer, ten Shenyang J-5 fighter jets, and three Nanchang BT-6/PT-6 light trainers. Not to be outdone, the Soviets delivered in April 1967 a second batch of five MiG-17F jets and two Mil Mi-4 Hound light helicopters.

Like the other branches of the then FARK, the Royal Cambodian Aviation's own military capabilities by the late 1960s remained unimpressive, being barely able to accomplish its primary mission which was to defend the national airspace. Due to its low strength and limited flying assets, the AVRK was relegated to a combat support role by providing transportation services to ARK infantry units and occasional low-level close air support (CAS) to ground operations. Apart from two modern tarmacked airstrips located respectively at Pochentong and at a Chinese-built civilian airport in Siem Reap, the other thirteen available airfields in the country at the time consisted of rudimentary unpaved runways previously built by the Japanese Imperial Army during World War II that lacked permanent rear-echelon support facilities, which were only used temporarily as emergency landing strips but never as secondary airbases.

Consequently, and in accordance with Cambodia's neutralist foreign policy, few combat missions were flown. AVRK activities were restricted to air patrols in order to protect Cambodia's airspace from the numerous incursions made by U.S. Air Force (USAF), Republic of Vietnam Air Force (VNAF) and Royal Thai Air Force (RTAF) aircraft. In 1962, during a period of heightened tension with Thailand over Preah Vihear, a disputed temple in the Dângrêk Mountains border area, the C-47 transports of the Liaison and Transport Group (GLT) dropped at night three planeloads of paratroopers over the Choam Ksan district of Preah Vihear Province, in a show of force intended to intimidate the Thai government. The AVRK C-47 transports resumed the same role again in 1964, when they carried out another battalion-sized parachute drop over two days near Samrong in Oddar Meanchey Province along the Thai border, and landing strips were improvised at Siem Reap and Battambang for the C-47 and An-2 transports supplying the ARK troops. Detachments of MiG-17F jets and AD-4N Skyraiders were also deployed at these locations after the intrusion of RTAF airplanes into the Cambodian airspace, but both sides prudently avoided confrontation and there were no incidents. A more serious clash occurred on March 21, 1964, when a patrol of two AVRK T-28D fighter-bombers penetrated 3.22 km (over 2 Mi) into South Vietnam and shot down an L-19 light aircraft in retaliation for a VNAF strike into Cambodia, killing both the Vietnamese pilot and the American observer.

It was not until the late 1960s however, that the AVRK received its first sustained combat experience. In early 1968, its T-28D Trojans, AD-4N Skyraiders and some MiG-17F jets were again sent to Takéo Province, dropping bombs on pre-planned targets in support of Royal Army troops conducting a counter-insurgency sweep against armed elements of the Vietnamese Cao Đài militant sect that had entered the province from neighbouring South Vietnam; AVRK combat elements were also deployed to the Samlaut district of Battambang Province during the Samlaut Uprising, where they bombed Khmer Rouge insurgent strongholds. In November 1969, the AVRK supported the Khmer Royal Army in a restrained sweeping operation targeting People's Army of Vietnam (PAVN) and Vietcong (VC) sanctuaries at Labang Siek in Ratanakiri Province. Some T-28D fighter-bombers, L-19A reconnaissance aircraft and Alouette helicopters provided air cover to the ground operation, whilst a few combat sorties were staged by the MiG-17F jets and AD-4N Skyraiders from Pochentong.

=== Pre-1970 organization ===
By March 1970, the Royal Cambodian Aviation had a strength of 1,250 Officers and airmen under the command of Colonel Keu Pau Ann (who had replaced Major general Dr. Ngo Hou in 1968), consisting in most part of flight crew personnel – pilots, instructor pilots, navigators, flight engineers, radio operators, and flight mechanics – and ground technicians – air controllers, radar and radio station operators, meteorologists, maintenance personnel, and auxiliary male and female personnel employed on administrative tasks. The main air elements of the AVRK Tactical Air Group consisted of four flight groups – one advanced training, one attack, one transport and liaison, and one helio – provided with a mixed inventory of 143 aircraft of 23 different types, mostly of French, American, Soviet, Chinese, Yugoslavian, and Canadian origin. Most of the aircraft and personnel were concentrated at the military airbase adjacent to the Pochentong International Airport at Phnom Penh, which also housed the Air Academy and the AVRK Headquarters, being structured as follows:

- The Royal Flying School at Pochentong operated an Advanced Training Squadron consisting of three Nanchang BT-6/PT-6, eight Yakovlev Yak-18 Max and twelve Gardan GY-80 Horizon light trainers, plus four Potez CM.170R Fouga Magister (converted to the ground attack role) and four Cessna T-37B Tweet jet trainers (only one was operational by 1970).
- The Intervention Group had six Shenyang J-5, twelve MiG-17F fighter jets, one MiG-15UTI jet trainer and one FT-5 jet trainer; sixteen Douglas AD-4N Skyraider three-seat night attack aircraft (only eight were operational by 1968), and seventeen North American T-28D Trojan fighter-bombers.
- The Observation and Combat Accompanying Group had eight Cessna L-19A Bird Dog observation light aircraft.
- The Transport and Liaison Group operated one Douglas C-54B Skymaster four-engine transport (used as a VIP transport), one Ilyushin Il-14, two Cessna 180 Skywagons, three de Havilland Canada DHC L-20 Beaver STOL utility transports, three UTVA-60AT1 utility and liaison aircraft, six Dassault MD 315R Flamant light twin-engined transports, eight Antonov An-2 Colt and twelve Douglas C-47 Skytrain transports.
- The Helicopter Group operated one Mil Mi-4 Hound, one Sikorsky H-19 Chickasaw, and two Sikorsky H-34 Choctaw utility and transport helicopters, plus eight Sud Aviation SA 313B Alouette II, and three or five Sud Aviation SA 316B Alouette III light helicopters.

In addition to aircraft acquired from or donated by friendly countries, the AVRK between 1962 and 1966 also incorporated on its inventory a small number of planes and helicopters flown into Cambodia by defecting VNAF pilots, which included three A-1H Skyraiders and two Sikorsky H-34 helicopters, plus one civilian-operated Dornier Do 28A STOL light utility aircraft.

=== Security Battalion ===
To patrol its main facilities and aircraft in Pochentong against possible acts of sabotage or enemy attacks, the AVRK command raised in 1967–68 an airfield security unit, the Air Fusiliers Battalion (Bataillon de Fusiliers de l'Air – BFA). Similar in function to the British RAF Regiment, the BFA was organized as a light infantry unit comprising a battalion headquarters (HQ), three company HQs and three rifle companies maintained primarily for airfield security duties and static defence. Permanently allocated at Pochentong airbase and commanded by AVRK Major Sou Chhorn, the battalion fielded some 200-300 airmen armed with obsolete French-made bolt-action rifles, sub-machine guns and light machine guns.

=== Reorganization 1970–71 ===
In the wake of the March 1970 coup, the Royal Cambodian Aviation was re-designated Khmer National Aviation (Aviation nationale khmère; AVNK), though it remained under Army command. Colonel Keu Pau Ann was replaced as the AVNK Chief-of-Staff by his deputy, Major (promptly promoted to lieutenant colonel) So Satto, with Major Penn Randa becoming deputy chief-of-staff for tactical operations and Major Ea Chhong the deputy chief-of-staff for logistics. After securing material support from the United States, South Vietnam, and Thailand, the new Khmer National Aviation immediately commenced combat operations, and embarked on an ambitious reorganisation and expansion program. Shortly after the coup, however, the French military mission suspended all the cooperation with the Cambodian armed forces, thus depriving the AVNK of vital training and technical assistance. China and the Soviet Union also severed their military assistance programs, which resulted in serious maintenance problems for its Shenyang and MiG fighter jets.

With the increase in activity at Pochentong airbase, the AVNK Air Academy (École de l'Air; formerly, the Royal Flying School) was moved in August 1970 to more quieter and less congested facilities at Battambang airfield. The director of the Air Academy, Lieutenant colonel Norodom Vatvani organized a road convoy to transport all the technical equipment whilst the instructor pilots flew the Gardan GY-80 Horizons to the new airfield, although the Cessna T-37B Tweet jet trainers were left behind at Pochentong. To provide air cover more effectively to the FANK's six military districts or "Military Regions" (Regions Militaires), the AVNK Command envisaged the creation of three Air Force districts, the 1st, 2nd, and 3rd Air Regions (Regions Aériennes). However, these plans never came to fruition and only the 1st Air Region (1ér Region Aérienne) had been established by 1973, which encompassed nearly the entire Cambodian territory and was concurrently headed by the Air Force Commander.

The VNAF flew numerous combat missions inside Cambodia since March in support of joint FANK/Army of the Republic of Vietnam (ARVN) ground operations, and to better coordinate its own missions they established at Pochentong a liaison office, the Direct Air Support Centre (DASC) Zulu. In addition, South Vietnamese O-1D Bird Dog Forward air controllers began regularly staging reconnaissance flights from Pochentong to guide VNAF airstrikes and artillery fire. On May 19, 1970, as a follow-up to the earlier ground invasion during the Cambodian Campaign, U.S. President Richard Nixon launched Operation Freedom Deal, a military air campaign led by the United States Seventh Air Force with the goal of providing air support and interdiction in the region. Initially, the operation targeted the base areas and border sanctuaries of the People's Army of Vietnam (PAVN) and the Viet Cong (VC), though as time went on, most of the bombing was carried out to support the newly-established Khmer Republic Government of Lon Nol and the FANK's large-scale ground offensives (Operations Chenla I and Chenla II) launched against PAVN and Khmer Rouge strongholds in north-eastern Cambodia between August 1970 and December 1971.

An initial expansion of the AVNK inventory in September 1970 under American auspices was accomplished with the delivery of six UH-1 Iroquois helicopter gunships with temporary South Vietnamese crews. The VNAF assigned a 49-man contingent of pilots and ground technicians to Pochentong to help fly and maintain these airframes until AVNK personnel had completed their instruction cycle manned by US advisors in South Vietnam. To ease maintenance, it was decided upon American suggestion to build the AVNK's strike component around the T-28D Trojan, since both its pilots and ground technicians were already well-acquainted with this aircraft type, and the Americans had plenty of surplus airframes and spare parts available. As a result, the rate of T-28D sorties increased, with 2,016 sorties being recorded between March and October 1970, in contrast to the 360 sorties of the MiG-17F and Shenyang fighter jets, and the 108 strikes of the Fouga Magister jets registed during that same period.

=== The Pochentong raid ===
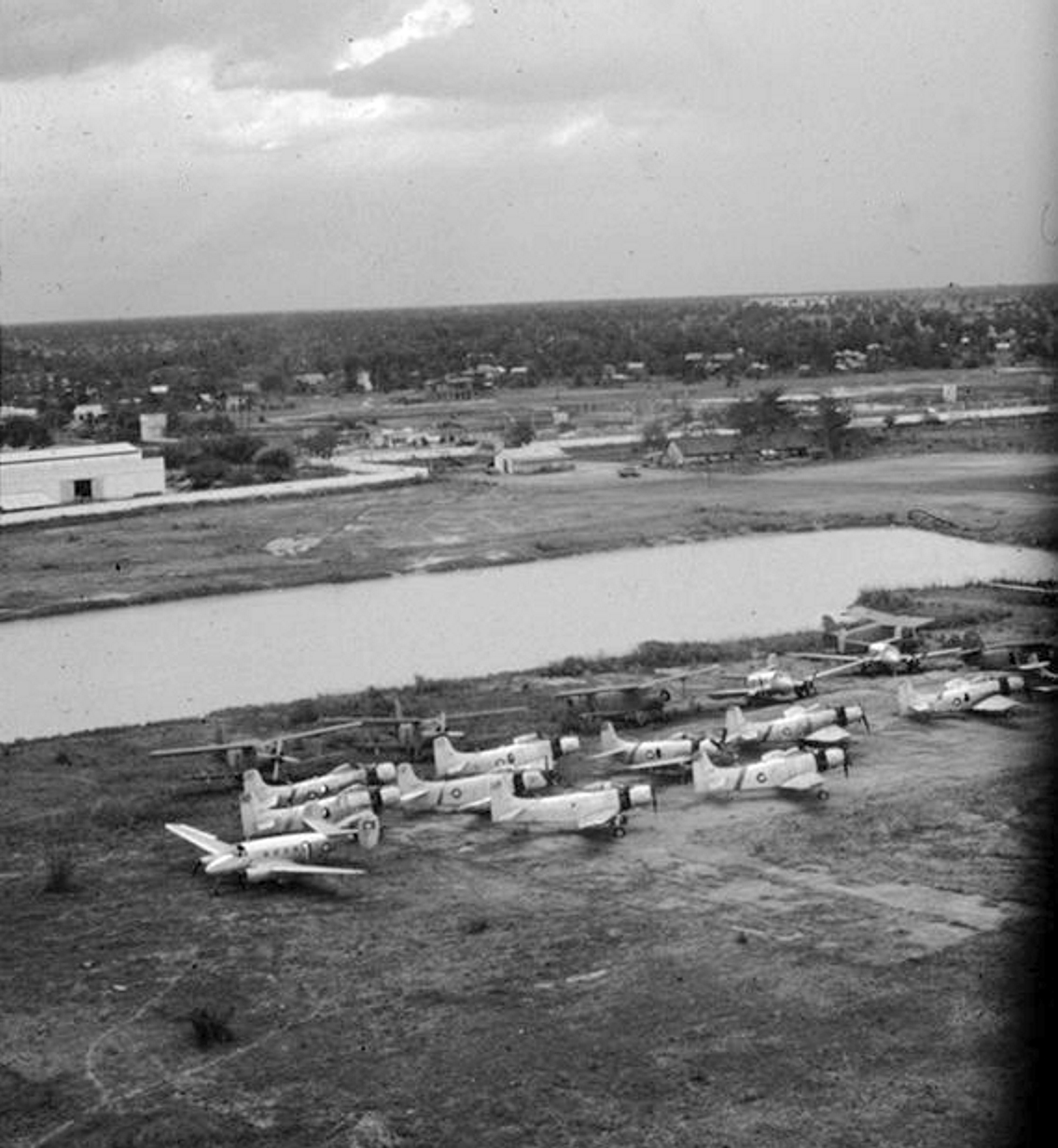
Abandoned Khmer Air Force aircraft parked at Pochentong Air Base, Phnom Penh, in May 1971. Identifiable aircraft are nine Douglas AD-4N Skyraider attack aircraft, three Dassault MD 315R Flamant light transports and five Antonov An-2 light transports.

On the night of 21–22 January 1971, a hundred or so-strong PAVN "Sapper" Commando force (Đặc Công, equivalent of "spec op" in English) managed to pass undetected through the defensive perimeter of the Special Military Region (Région Militaire Speciale – RMS) set by the Cambodian Army around Phnom Penh and carried out a spectacular raid on Pochentong airbase. Broken into six smaller detachments armed mostly with AK-47 assault rifles and RPG-7 anti-tank rocket launchers, the PAVN raiders succeeded in scaling the barbed-wire fence and quickly overwhelmed the poorly armed airmen of the Security Battalion on duty that night. Once inside the facility, the raiders unleashed a furious barrage of small-arms fire and rocket-propelled grenades against any aircraft they found on the parking area adjacent to the runway and nearby buildings. One of the commando teams even scaled the adjoining commercial terminal of the civilian airport and after taking position at the international restaurant located on the roof, they fired a rocket into the napalm supply depot near the VNAF apron.

When the smoke cleared the next morning, the Khmer National Aviation had been virtually annihilated. A total of 69 aircraft stationed at Pochentong at the time were either completely destroyed or severely damaged on the ground, including many T-28D Trojans, nearly all the Shenyang, MiG, T-37B and Fouga Magister jets, all the L-19A Bird Dogs and An-2 transports, the UH-1 helicopter gunships, three VNAF O-1 Bird Dogs and even a VIP transport recently presented to President Lon Nol by the South Vietnamese government. Apart from the aircraft losses, 39 AVNK officers and enlisted men had lost their lives and another 170 were injured. The only airframes that escaped destruction were six T-28D Trojans temporarily deployed to Battambang, ten GY-80 Horizon light trainers (also stationed at Battambang), eight Alouette II and Alouette III helicopters, two Sikorsky H-34 helicopters, one T-37B jet trainer, and a single Fouga Magister jet that had been grounded for repairs. Pochentong airbase was closed for almost a week while the damage was assessed, wreckage removed, the runway repaired, and the stocks of fuel and ammunitions replenished.

=== Reorganization 1971–72 ===
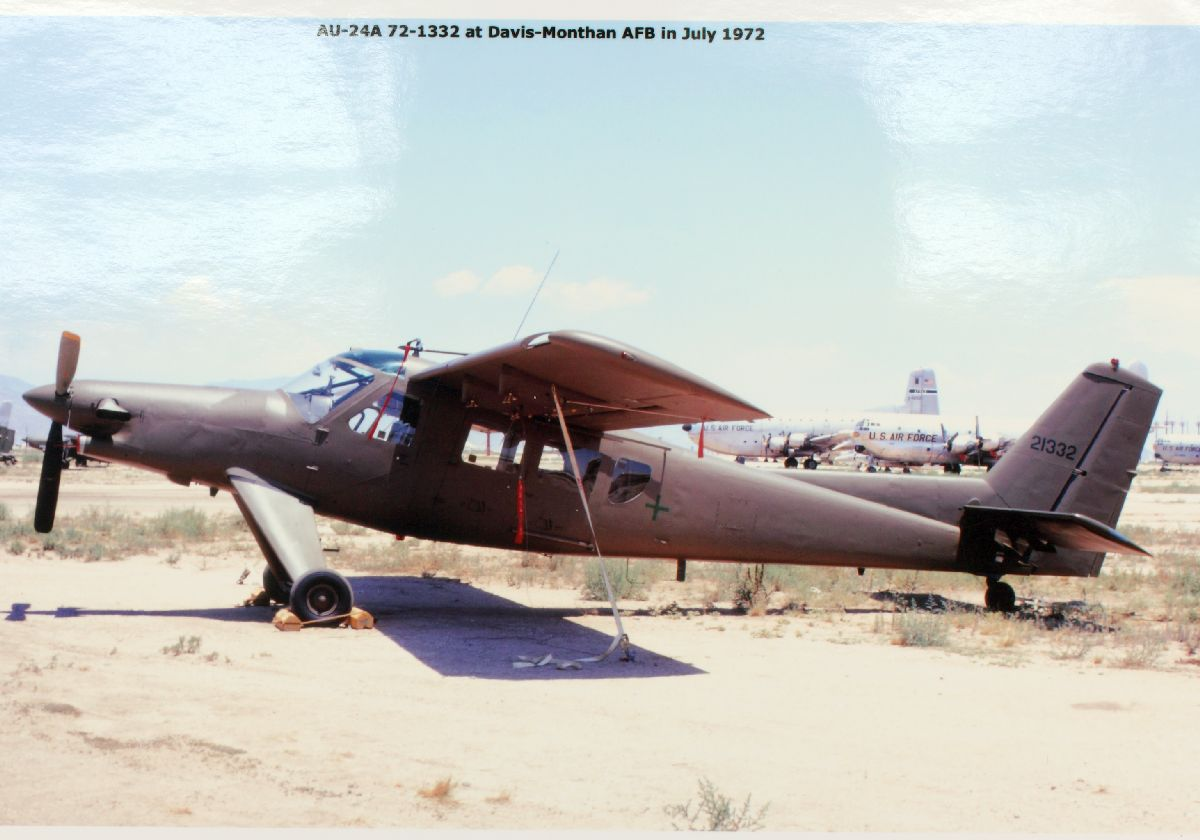
Helio AU-24A Stallion in storage at Davis-Monthan AFB, July 1972, prior to its delivery to the Khmer Air Force.

The Cambodian Air Force was reborn on June 8, 1971, when it was made a separated command from the Army and thus became the third independent branch of the FANK. This new status was later confirmed on December 15, when the AVNK officially changed its name to Khmer Air Force (French: Armée de l'air khmère; AAK), or KAF. Promoted to Colonel, So Satto remained at the helm of the new Khmer Air Force and immediately began implementing an expansion program. To better coordinate USAF and VNAF air support, the KAF Command established that same month at Pochentong an Air Operations Centre – AOC (Centre des opérations aériennes – COA) headed by Lt. Col. Norodom Baley, who had previously attended a tactical air course in West Germany during the early 1960s. Starting from scratch, the KAF received a new influx of US-made aircraft under the auspices of the American Military Equipment Delivery Team, Cambodia (MEDTC) assistance program. Among the most effective additions were two Douglas AC-47D Spooky gunships turned over to Cambodia in June 1971, which were initially used for night surveillance and defense operations at Pochentong Airbase, in order to deter further PAVN sapper attacks. Nationalist Chinese advisors and engineers from Taiwan also assisted the KAF ground technicians at Pochentong in the rebuilding of former AVNK airframes damaged in the January raid, enabling some transport planes and helicopters to be repaired and returned quickly to flying condition.

By the end of the year, the KAF's inventory now included sixteen T-28D fighter-bombers, twenty-four Cessna O-1D reconnaissance/observation light aircraft, nineteen C-47 transports, five U-17 light utility aircraft, nine Cessna T-41D Mescalero trainers, eleven Bell UH-1D transports, sixteen U-1A Otter liaison aircraft, three AC-47D Spooky gunships, and one EC-47D SIGINT aircraft. Col. So Satto also requested from the United States Northrop F-5A light fighters to replace the destroyed Shenyang, MiG and Fouga jets, but the U.S. government refused and offered in alternative some North American F-86F Sabrejets on the verge of retirement from the RTAF. However, an inspection made by a team of Cambodian technicians sent to Thailand revealed that the airframes were no longer in flyable condition, so the KAF Command rejected the proposal altogether. Unable to acquire new fighter jets, the KAF was left without air-to-air capacity for the remainder of the war. An additional offer of some Fairchild C-119 Flying Boxcar transports which had previously seen service with the VNAF was equally turned down by the Cambodians. The Australians delivered in January 1972 six silvered C-47 transports for training purposes, which were posted to the KAF Air Academy in Battambang.

In 1972 KAF expansion slowed slightly as organisational difficulties were encountered. The Tactical Air Group was therefore re-organized into five squadrons created from the existing flight groups – the T-28D fighter-bombers under the 1st Fighter Squadron (1ér Escadron de Combat); the EC-47D, the C-47 transports and AC-47D gunships under the 1st Transport Squadron (1ér Escadron de Transport); the O-1D reconnaissance/observation light aircraft, the U-17 light utility aircraft and U-1A liaison aircraft under the Forward Air Controller Squadron (Escadron d'Observation et d'Accompagnement au Combat); the UH-1D, H-34 and Alouette helicopters under the Helicopter Squadron (Escadron d'Hélicoptères); and the silvered C-47 trainers, the T-41D trainers and the GY-80 light trainers under the Advanced Training Squadron (Escadron d'Entrainement Avancée). With the exception of the training squadron, which was stationed permanently at the Air Force Academy in Battambang, the other four squadrons were based at Pochentong Airbase. Inherited from the defunct AVNK, the KAF's administrative, support and technical branches remained untouched by this reorganization and retained their separate structure under the Territorial and Technical Group commands.

New airbases (Bases Aériennes – BA) were laid down near the provincial capitals of Battambang (BA 201), Kampong Cham (BA 121) and Kampong Chhnang (BA 124), and near the Khmer National Navy's (Marine Nationale Khmère – MNK) Ream Naval Base (BA 122). Later in the war, secondary airfields and assorted helipads were temporally set up at Kampot, Oudong, Kampong Thom, and Steung Mean Chey near Phnom Penh.

Chinese instructor pilots from Taiwan were posted on loan at the KAF Battambang Air Academy to train its pilots whereas Khmer cadets and air crews were sent for L-19, 0-1, UH-1, T-28, AC-47, EC-47, AU-24, and C-123 training to South Vietnam, Thailand, and the United States. Most of the advanced courses and specialized training of Khmer combat pilots was conducted by Thai instructors at the RTAF Kamphaeng Saen Flight Training School in Nakhon Pathom Province and by American advisors of Detachment 1, 56th Special Operations Wing at Udorn, U-Tapao and Takhli airbases in Thailand, while others were dispatched to attend observer courses at Bien Hoa Air Base, South Vietnam. A small number of student pilots also went to train with the U.S. Navy at the Naval Air Station Pensacola, Florida, while others were sent to the USAF Air University, Maxwell Air Force Base in Montgomery, Alabama, and four student pilots attended courses at the Royal Australian Air Force (RAAF) East Sale Airbase in Victoria, Australia.

In the midst of this reorganisation, the Khmer Air Force's own inventory continued to expand via the MEDTC during the following year. Under the Foreign Military Sales program between January and November 1972, the KAF took delivery of fourteen AU-24A Stallion mini-gunships, fifteen T-28D fighter-bombers, four AC-47D gunships, nineteen UH-1H helicopters, sixteen T-28B unarmed trainers in poor condition, and another four T-41D trainers. An important addition to the KAF, the AU-24A mini-gunships were assigned to a newly-raised Mini-gunship Squadron (Escadron AU-24) stationed at Pochentong, which broadened supply convoy escort operations on the lower Mekong-Bassac corridors. Such operations had been carried out in conjunction with the MNK since mid-1971, when the KAF began to provide air cover to MNK convoys with their AC-47D gunships. Despite the slow improvements delivered by Brigadier General So Satto's expansion program, the KAF's own combat capabilities remained low and because of plentiful U.S. air support provided by Operation Freedom Deal – used excessively by the Cambodian Army – was relegated to a minor role only.

=== Expansion 1973–74 ===
This situation began to change in March 1973, when the Khmer Air Force suffered a setback after a pro-Sihanouk T-28D fighter-bomber pilot bombed the presidential palace and deserted. After ordering a complete stand-down of the KAF for three days, President Lon Nol dismissed Brig. Gen. So Satto and replaced him by his deputy, Col. Penn Randa (promptly promoted to Brigadier general), who immediately began to enforce new programs to improve the KAF. The most important of these plans was the establishment of a KAF Direct Air Support Centre – DASC (Centre de soutien aérien direct – CSAD). Co-located at the FANK Combined Operations Centre – COC (Centre d'opérations combinées), the DASC was given responsibility for gathering current targeting information from U.S. aircraft and Cambodian Army units in the field, and passing on to the KAF. However, this new concept was resisted by the commander of the KAF Air Operations Centre – who was unwilling to turn over responsibility to the newly-created DASC –, by continuing to feed the KAF with pre-planned strike co-ordinates. In practice, the Cambodian Army Command had little faith in the ability of the KAF's inexperienced forward air controllers to accurately spot targets and direct close air support, leaving the DASC to function primarily as a relay between the Army Headquarters in Phnom Penh and U.S. aircraft.

In May 1973, the KAF received five of an eventual eight Fairchild C-123K Provider transports on paper, which were employed extensively alongside the C-47 transports of the 1st Transport Squadron on air-drop resupply operations. That same month, under an accelerated delivery program named Project Nimble Voyage, the Americans gave the KAF ten UH-1G helicopter gunships, which were assigned to the Helicopter Squadron. Five of the machines were deployed to Battambang Airbase and the other five helicopters were stationed at Pochentong, being used extensively alongside the AC-47D and AU-24A gunships in the Mekong-Bassac convoy support role. Under Project Flycatcher, an improvement program for the KAF, the Americans delivered twelve T-28D Trojans, six UH-1H helicopters, five C-123K Providers and a smaller number of C-47 transports and O-1D Bird Dogs, later followed by a single AU-24A mini-gunship and twenty-four Cessna T-37B Tweet jet trainers before the program was officially terminated on June 30, 1973. This was to be the last official U.S. delivery of aircraft to Cambodia (though secret deliveries of a small number of T-28D aircraft continued under the auspices of the CIA until January 1975), which nevertheless significantly improved the combat capability of the KAF.

At the same time, the KAF Command continued to expand co-ordination with the Cambodian Army, despite an initial reluctance on the part of Army field commanders, who remained sceptical of their Air Force's capabilities. An Air-Ground Operations School – AGOS (École des opérations air-sol – EOAS) was opened in May to train forward air guides (FAGs) from the Army and in July, the KAF began providing forward air controllers to the Army's new Artillery Fire Co-ordination Centre – AFCC (Centre de coordination des tirs d'artillerie – CCTA) that would relay targets from Army field commanders on the ground to the DASC. On August 15, 1973, a ceasefire came into effect in Indochina and U.S. tactical and strategic air support was terminated, with the Khmer Air Force assuming full responsibility for all air operations in Cambodia. With the Khmer Rouge guerrillas controlling large parts of the countryside, the Khmer National Armed Forces were fighting an up-hill battle.

The KAF suffered a severe blow later in November 1973 when a second renegade T-28D pilot once more bombed the presidential palace and deserted. As with the earlier March incident, President Lon Nol ordered a bombing stand-down and relieved Brig. Gen. Penn Randa from its command. A new Air Force commander, Col. Ea Chhong, was promoted and immediately began to improve the performance of the KAF, with Brig. Gen. Pao Lim Sina as his deputy.

In an effort to further boost the KAF's capabilities, the Americans initiated three assistance programs. The first one, Operation Rotorhead Express, started in June 1974 when a U.S. Army team arrived at Pochentong to give a one-time repair to the KAF UH-1 helicopter fleet. This was followed in January 1975 by Operation Flycatcher (not to be confused with the earlier namesake U.S. aircraft delivery program), a similar USAF effort directed at the KAF's T-28D fighter-bombers carried out by a USAF team also at Pochentong. That same month, a USAF Mobile Training Team began in Thailand a training program intended to make the KAF airlift wing self-sufficient.

=== Late war organization 1974–75 ===
By January 1975 KAF's strength had peaked to 10,000 Officers and airmen (including airwomen) under the command of Brig. Gen. Ea Chhong, equipped with a total inventory of 211 aircraft of several types distributed amongst the Tactical Air Group squadrons as follows:

- The 1st Fighter Squadron aligned sixty-four T-28D Trojan fighter-bombers.
- The Mini-gunship Squadron had fourteen AU-24A Stallion mini-gunships.
- The Forward Air Controller Squadron operated forty-five Cessna O-1D Bird Dog reconnaissance/observation light aircraft, sixteen U-1A Otter liaison aircraft and five U-17 light utility aircraft.
- The 1st Transport Squadron aligned twenty-one Fairchild C-123K Provider transports, twenty-three Douglas C-47 Skytrain transports, fourteen Douglas AC-47D Spooky gunships, and one EC-47D SIGINT aircraft.
- The Helicopter Squadron had ten Bell UH-1G gunships, forty-six Bell UH-1D/H transports, three Sud Aviation SA 316B Alouette III light helicopters, and two Sikorsky H-34 Choctaw utility transports.
- The Advanced Training Squadron of the Air Force Academy at Battambang Airbase operated six silvered C-47 trainers, sixteen T-28B light trainers, ten Gardan GY-80 Horizon light trainers, twenty-two Cessna T-41D Mescalero trainers, and twenty-four Cessna T-37B Tweet jet trainers.

=== Air Force Security regiments ===
Following several attacks on Cambodian airfields early in the war, the KAF Security troops underwent a major reorganization by mid-1971. The battered BFA at Pochentong was expanded accordingly from a single rifle battalion of three companies, to a full security regiment aligning three battalions, receiving the designation of 1st Air Fusiliers Regiment (1er Regiment de Fusiliers de l'Air – 1 RFA). Between July 1971 and December 1972, Air Force battalions were rotated through intensive infantry training courses manned by the U.S. Army-Vietnam Individual Training Program (UITG) in South Vietnam to upgrade their combat capabilities, with selected airmen receiving some specialized training as well – by early 1973, 1 RFA aligned two rifle battalions plus one specialized battalion trained for search-and-rescue (SAR) missions, crash-site recovery and VIP protection. The KAF Security command under Colonel Sou Chhorn was augmented in 1974 when a second unit was brought to strength at Kampong Cham Airbase, which became the 2nd Air Fusiliers Regiment (French: 2éme Regiment de Fusiliers de l'Air – 2 RFA). 2 RFA battalions were trained in-country by the Khmer Special Forces at the Ream Infantry Training Centre near Kampong Som. By April 1975, KAF Security troops totalled some 1,600 airmen organized in six light infantry battalions, equipped with an assortment of outdated and modern U.S. and captured Soviet or Chinese small-arms.

== Facilities ==
Base	Operator	Description
Pochentong International Airport (Base Aérienne 101)	Khmer Air Force/Republic of Vietnam Air Force (VNAF)/U.S. Air Force	Built by the French in 1958-59, is a dual-use airport, civilian and military, the primary hub for international civilian flights. It also served as the home of the KAF Tactical Air Group combat and transport squadrons and included state-of-the-art hangar facilities, as well as operations, logistics, billeting, recreational and dining facilities. It was also used by the VNAF and the US.
Ream (Base Aérienne 122)	Khmer Air Force	Originally constructed in 1961 with assistance from the Soviet Union, it was converted into a military airbase in 1971-72, and was located near the Khmer National Navy's namesake coastal naval base in Kampot province.
Battambang Airport (Base Aérienne 201)	Khmer Air Force	Built in 1968, it was the second largest military airbase in the country, located near the city of Battambang, capital of the namesake province. Its location made it a prime candidate as a training base for the KAF, and was the home of the Air Force Academy and its Advanced Training Squadron since August 1970.
Kampong Chhnang Airport (Base Aérienne 124)	Khmer Air Force	Opened in 1971-72, it was located near the city of Kampong Chhnang, capital of the namesake province.
Kampong Cham Airport (Base Aérienne 121)	Khmer Air Force	Opened in 1971-72, it was located near the city of Kampong Cham, capital of the namesake province.

== Combat history ==
Besides convoy escort duties on the lower Mekong and Bassac rivers, resupply missions of isolated governmental garrisons, casualty evacuation, routine transportation, armed surveillance, aerial reconnaissance missions and counter-insurgency operations coordinated with both the Cambodian Army (ANK) and the Khmer National Navy (MNK), the Khmer Air Force also conducted a series of notable combat operations in support of Naval Infantry battalions and FANK ground forces units fighting both the PAVN and the Khmer Rouge in several conventional battles:

- In the months following the March 1970 change of government, the new AVNK was thrown into heavy action. Its MiG, Shenyang and Fouga jets bombed and strafed PAVN/VC troop concentrations and sanctuaries along the Takéo, Kandal, Svay Rieng, Mondulkiri and Ratanakiri southern and eastern border provinces, while the T-28D Trojans and a few AD-4N Skyraiders were employed on combat sorties north of Phnom Penh and in Kampong Cham Province.
- During Operation Chenla II, launched by the FANK High Command on August 21, 1971, the Khmer Air Force's T-28D fighter-bombers and C-47 transports supported with air strikes and air resupply drops the advance of the Cambodian Army task-force sent to retake all of Route 6 and the road between Kampong Cham and Kampong Thom from the PAVN. KAF helicopters carried Cambodian troops into the targeted areas and later helped evacuate the task-force units, disorganized and cut-off by a vigorous PAVN counter-offensive held in late October.
- On October 7, 1972, the PAVN hit Phnom Penh once again with a spectacular sapper attack, in which a commando force of 103 men from the 367th Sapper Regiment raided the Cambodian Army armoured cavalry headquarters located at the Old Stadium in the northern outskirts of the City. The PAVN raiders even managed to capture seven M113 armored personnel carriers and drove them out in column into the capital's streets, causing panic among the inhabitants. Initially taken by surprise, Cambodian Army troops took several hours to dominate the situation, and urgent air support was requested. The Khmer Air Force response came in the form of two AC-47D gunships whose firepower succeeded in disabling all the vehicles, thus stopping the column before it could reach the city's centre, killing in the process 83 members of the sapper force and scattered the rest.
- During the Battle of Kampong Cham in September 1973, the KAF provided close air support to Operation "Castor 21", the combined Cambodian Army-Khmer National Navy (MNK) amphibious assault to retake the enemy-held half of the provincial capital of Kampong Cham, which had been stormed by Khmer Rouge forces earlier in August. In coordination with Khmer Special Forces teams on the ground, the KAF's C-47 and C-123K transports also carried out successfully aerial resupply drops on behalf of Cambodian Army units defending the retaken city.
- In October of that same year, the KAF went on to the offensive again with Operation "Thunderstrike" (Operation Coup de Tonnerre), a nine-day' ground assault operation in support of Cambodian Army units fighting Khmer Rouge forces south of the Prek Thnoat River. Striking in that area located south of Phnom Penh between Route 2 and Route 3, T-28D fighter-bomber pilots logged a record of seventy sorties a day. Although both the 1st and 3rd Infantry Divisions were already thrown on the defensive and failed to capitalize on "Thunderstrike" by making no significant advances, the FANK High Command was nonetheless impressed by their Air Force improved performance.
- The Khmer Air Force scored a major hit in March 1974, when a flight of ten T-28D fighter-bombers guided by a single Cessna O-1D FAC spotter struck the main PAVN transhipment point at Dambe, Kratié Province, where some 250 supply trucks laden with ammunitions lay in a truck park hidden on a rubber plantation. After the KAF T-28D pilots dropped their 250 lb bombs over the plantation, they unexpectedly ignited a violent chain reaction which – based on the analysis of post-strike aerial reconnaissance photos – destroyed at least 125 trucks, a record for the Second Indochina War.
- That same month, during the MNK's second large-scale amphibious assault, Operation "Castor 50", the KAF provided again close air support and air resupply drops to Cambodian Army troops fighting to retake both Oudong, the capital of Oudong Meanchey Province and Kampot, the capital of Kampot Province from the Khmer Rouge.
- Later on June–July of that year, during the siege of the district capital of Kampong Seila in Koh Kong Province, located some 135 Km (84 Mi) south-west of Phnom Penh, down Route 4, after two unsuccessful attempts, the KAF heli-lifted a Khmer Special Forces team to help coordinate aerial resupply operations by their C-47 and C-123K transports to alleviate the starvation suffered by the local civilian population after their town was besieged during a record eight-month-long period by Khmer Rouge forces.

=== Operational hazards ===
Although regarded by most outside observers as the most professional branch of the Cambodian armed forces, the Khmer Air Force was seriously handicapped throughout its existence by several key problems that undermined its efficiency. Being an all-volunteer, technically-proficient service, the KAF was long plagued by shortages of skilled pilots – which forced KAF transport aircraft to sometimes having to take off with a single pilot on the cockpit, without the support of a co-pilot –, experienced flight instructors, and support personnel, coupled by the inconsistent quality of forward air controllers, pilot fatigue, inadequate training, lack of effective leadership – exacerbated by constant changes in command – and its inability to organize itself. Other chronic problems included an unfocused inventory, inadequate maintenance of airframes, unsuitable airfields, and an insufficient night support capability. As with the Cambodian Army, the KAF faced severe budgetary restraints after U.S. financial aid was slashed in 1973 and was riven by corruption: its pilots showed more interest to fly contraband operations than combat missions – most of the KAF's transport aircraft regularly experienced landing gear problems since the aircrews often tended to accept paid transportation services, overloading their planes with unauthorized civilian passengers and cargo – and also demanded bribes from Cambodian Army ground units before providing air support.

Training accidents remained a serious problem: in 1972–73 the morale of the Khmer Air Force pilots was strained by a series of crashes involving the T-28D Trojan, the T-41D Mescalero, and the AU-24A Stallion. Confidence in the T-28D eroded after fourteen crashes were recorded during a twelve-month period, even though eight of the crashes were due to pilot error, three to enemy anti-aircraft ground fire and only three to mechanical failure. Four T-41D trainers were also lost in separate incidents during July 1972, all pilots being killed. The AU-24A was beset with a long list of technical faults, which became painfully clear on August 10, 1973, after a Stallion crashed on a rocket pass, killing its crew and forced the KAF Command to ground temporarily the entire mini-gunship fleet.

Another problem that plagued the KAF was political dissent amongst its ranks. The 1st Fighter Squadron was regarded with deep distrust by both the FANK High Command and the Republican government, after some dissident pilots from that squadron tried unsuccessfully to assassinate top military and political officials (including President Lon Nol) on at least three separate occasions:

- On March 17, 1973, a disgruntled pro-Sihanouk KAF pilot, Capt. So Patra, flew his T-28D fighter-bomber into downtown Phnom Penh and made a sudden dive-bomb attack over the Presidential Palace at the Chamkarmon District. A total of 43 people were killed and another 35 injured in the bombing, after which the pilot flew to Hainan Island in the South China Sea. This incident led to the dismissal of Brig. Gen. So Satto.
- On November 19, 1973, the Presidential Palace was struck yet again by another dissident pilot, Lt. Pich Lim Khun, who subsequently deserted by flying its T-28D to Khmer Rouge-held Kratié Province. As a result of this second air strike, President Lon Nol purged the KAF of who were considered to be disloyal elements, which included Lieutenant colonels Norodom Baley and Norodom Vatvani, Major Dimang Rothary and Captain Oung Siphoun, and forced the resignation of Brig. Gen. Penn Randa.
- On April 14, 1975, for the third time in the war, a defecting Cambodian pilot attempted an aerial assassination of the nation's chief executive. That morning, a T-28D fighter-bomber flown by Lt. Kiev Yoursawath, dropped four 250 lb bombs over the FANK Joint General Staff Headquarters (État-Major Générale – EMG) located at Norodom Boulevard in Phnom Penh. Two landed about 60 ft (about 19 m) from where the president of the State Presidium, Lieutenant general Sak Sutsakhan, was chairing a cabinet meeting. Although the officials managed to escape unscathed, the bombs claimed the lives of seven Army officers and NCOs and twenty others were injured. The pilot then headed north and landed in one of the Khmer Rouge-controlled portions of Kampong Cham province.

The Khmer Air Force saw its aerial resupply capability severely curtailed late in the war, when on March 13, 1975, the Khmer Rouge hit Pochentong Airbase with Chinese-made Type 63 107mm rockets, which ignited an ammunition dump and destroyed a nearby storehouse used to pack and store air-drop cargo parachutes employed on resupply operations. The loss of their cargo parachute stocks deprived the KAF's C-47 and C-123K transports of the means to adequately support the isolated enclaves still held by Cambodian Army units, so the U.S. government had to hire civilian contractors in order to carry out most of the outpost resupply drops within Cambodia.

=== Final operations 1974–75 ===
It was only in the final months of the war that the Khmer Air Force finally managed to exceed all previous performances. Taking full advantage of their air superiority, the KAF employed all available airframes to the limit – ranging from T-28D fighter-bombers, UH-1G helicopter gunships, and AC-47D and AU-24A gunships to T-37B jet trainers converted to the ground attack role, and even C-123K transports serving as makeshift heavy bombers – launched an unprecedented number of combat sorties against Khmer Rouge forces massing around Phnom Penh. Operating against relatively light enemy anti-aircraft defences, Cambodian T-28D pilots logged over 1,800 daytime missions during a two-month period alone whilst the AU-24A mini-gunships and C-123K transports carried out at night bombing operations against entrenched enemy 107mm rocket positions north of the capital. To help locate these same positions and set up ambushes, detachments from the KAF's 1 RFA security battalions were heli-lifted behind the enemy lines, but they were decimated by insurgent troops.

Besides combat sorties, the KAF was also involved in last-minute evacuation efforts. On April 12, 1975, its T-28D fighter-bombers and UH-1 Helicopters provided air cover to Operation Eagle Pull, the evacuation of the U.S. Embassy staff. Most of the T-28D pilots involved in this operation were forced to land their planes in the main road leading to Pochentong's civilian airport and adjacent to the military airbase, since the latter's airstrip was under heavy artillery fire. The Air Force command also kept on stand-by seven UH-1H transport helicopters at an improvised helipad mounted on the grounds of the Phnom Penh Olympic Stadium in the Cércle Sportive complex, ready to evacuate key members of the government. However, three of the machines had to be abandoned due to technical malfunctions when the evacuation finally took place on the morning of April 17. Amongst the small group of high-profile evacuees who boarded the remaining four helicopters heading for Kampong Thom was the KAF commander Brig. Gen. Ea Chhong.

Despite their best efforts, the overstretched Khmer Air Force alone could not prevent the defeat of the Cambodian Army and stem the tide of the advancing Khmer Rouge forces. On April 16 KAF T-28D Trojans flew their last combat sortie by bombing the Air Force Control Centre and hangars at Pochentong upon its capture by insurgent units. After virtually expending their entire ordnance reserves, 97 aircraft – consisting of fifty T-28D fighter-bombers, thirteen UH-1D/H transports, twelve O-1D Bird Dogs, ten C-123K transports, seven AC-47D gunships, three AU-24A mini-gunships (one crashed at sea in the Gulf of Thailand after running out of fuel), nine C-47 transports, and three T-41D trainers – escaped from Pochentong, Battambang, Kampong Cham, Kampong Thom, Kampong Chhnang and Ream airbases and auxiliary airfields flown by their respective crews (with a small number of civilian dependents on board) to safe haven in neighbouring Thailand.

The rest of the KAF personnel that remained in Cambodia – including the male and female clerical staff, the ground technicians, some pilots, and those airmen serving on the 1st Air Fusiliers Regiment at Pochentong (who defended the Airbase until the very end) – had no choice but to surrender, with most of them being executed by the Khmer Rouge. The last stand of the Khmer Air Force took place at Kampong Cham Airbase, where the airmen of the 2nd Air Fusiliers Regiment continued to resist for another week despite the official capitulation order, until they ran out of ammunition. The airbase commander, together with his deputy, the local ground technicians and the airmen of the Security battalions were captured and reportedly executed in a gruesome manner. Later unconfirmed reports claim that a few qualified ex-KAF pilots and technicians escaped this fate by being pressed into service in the Air Force of the Kampuchea Revolutionary Army (AFKRA) of the new Democratic Kampuchea Regime to fly and maintain the remaining French- and US-made aircraft left behind.

== Aftermath ==
By 1975, Khmer Air Force losses totalled 100 aircraft, mostly due to combat attrition, training accidents, and desertions, as well for other causes – between December 1971 and January 1972 four Alouette II and one Alouette III light helicopters were sent overseas for maintenance and general overhaul at the HAECO in Hong Kong, but there is no record that these airframes were ever returned to Cambodia. Besides accidental crashes and combat losses, three U-1A Otters were destroyed on the ground at Pochentong by a Khmer Rouge mortar attack in March 1972 and later in August that year KAF Lt. Col. Long Trasom, the commander of the helicopter squadron, was killed when his UH-1H helicopter was shot down by a SA-7 Grail surface-to-air missile near Svay Rieng, the capital of Svay Rieng Province. In December 1973, a O-1D Bird Dog observation light aircraft was accidentally shot down by the Cambodian Army's air defense half-brigade after it strayed near the Presidential Palace at the Chamkarmon District in Phnom Penh.

The Khmer Rouge did manage, though, to salvage at least twenty-two T-28D fighter-bombers, four GY-80 Horizon light trainers, ten T-37B jet trainers, nineteen T-41D trainers, five U-17 light utility aircraft, seven C-123K transports, nine AU-24A mini-gunships, six AC-47D gunships, fourteen C-47 transports, twenty UH-1D/H and UH-1G helicopters, and three Alouette III light helicopters. Of the twelve T-28D Trojans operated by the Khmer Rouge's AFKRA at Ream Airbase, at least five were destroyed on the ground along with two C-47 and one C-46F transport aircraft when U.S. Air Force AC-130 gunships and U.S. Navy A-6A Intruder and A-7E Corsair II attack jets bombed the facility during the Mayaguez incident on May 15, 1975. As for the other airframes, lack of trained pilots, poor maintenance and a chronic shortage of spare parts ensured that only a handful of these were still airworthy when the AFKRA was neutralized by the PAVN in February 1979 during the Cambodian–Vietnamese War.

== List of Cambodian Air Force commanders ==
=== Chiefs-of-Staff ===
- Major general Ngo Hou (1954–1968)
- Colonel Keu Pau Ann (1968–1970)
- Brigadier general So Satto (1970–73)
- Brigadier general Penn Randa (1973)
- Brigadier general Ea Chhong (1973–75)

=== Airbase commanders ===
- Lieutenant colonel Pal Sam Or – commander of Pochentong Airbase and later Ream Airbase
- Lieutenant colonel Sok Sambaur – commander of Kampong Chhnang Airbase and later Pochentong Airbase (April 1975)
- Lieutenant colonel Norodom Vatvani – commander of Battambang Airbase
- Colonel Chhun Pheang – commander of Pochentong Airbase
- Colonel Khuon Frang – commander of Pochentong Airbase (5–17 April 1975)
- Colonel Mao Kim Sourn – commander of Kampong Cham Airbase (1971–1973)
- Colonel Meas Maroth – commander of Kampong Cham Airbase (1973–1975)
- Colonel Oum Traluk – commander of Battambang Airbase (April 1975)
- Colonel Neang Ly – commander of Ream Airbase (1973–1975) and later Battambang Airbase (13–17 April 1975)
- Colonel Pao Lim Sina – commander of Ream Airbase
- Colonel Smuk Chhiap – commander of Ream Airbase
- Colonel Nguon Tao – commander of Ream Airbase (April 1975)
- Colonel Phlok Saphat – commander of Kampong Chhnang Airbase (April 1975)

=== Air commanders ===
- Lieutenant colonel Lim Kim Khun – commander of the 1st Transport Squadron
- Lieutenant colonel Long Trasom – commander of the Helicopter Squadron
- Major Tiem Keam Suor – commander of the FAC Squadron

=== Support and technical branches' commanders ===
- Lieutenant colonel Norodom Baley – Director of the KAF Air Operations Centre
- Lieutenant colonel Norodom Vatvani – Director of the KAF Air Academy
- Lieutenant colonel Lim Kim Khun – Director of the KAF Air Academy (1970–1973 and 1974–1975)
- Lieutenant colonel Tan Sam Hong
- Major Dimang Rothary
- Captain Oung Siphoun

== Khmer Air Force uniforms and insignia ==
The Cambodian Air Force owed its origin and traditions to the French Far East Airforces (Forces Aériennes en Extrême-Orient – FAEO) of the First Indochina War, and even after the United States took the role as the main foreign sponsor for the Khmer National Armed Forces at the beginning of the 1970s, French military influence was still perceptible in their uniforms and insignia.

=== Service dress uniforms ===
Upon its formation in 1954, AVRK personnel received the French Army's M1945 tropical working and service dress (Tenue de toile kaki clair Mle 1945), standard issue in the ARK, consisting of a light khaki cotton shirt and pants. Modelled after the WWII U.S. Army tropical "Chino" working dress, the shirt had two patch breast pockets closed by clip-cornered straight flaps and shoulder straps whilst the trousers featured two pleats at the front hips, side slashed pockets and an internal pocket at the back, on the right side. In alternative, the short-sleeved M1946 (Chemisette kaki clair Mle 1946) – which had two pleated patch breast pockets closed by pointed flaps – and the "Chino"-style M1949 (Chemisette kaki clair Mle 1949) khaki shirts could be worn with the matching M1946 khaki shorts (Culotte courte kaki clair Mle 1946) in hot weather.

AVRK officers and pilots were given the standard FARK summer service dress uniform in light khaki cotton, which was patterned after the French Army M1946/56 khaki dress uniform (Vareuse d'officier Mle 1946/56 et Pantalon droit Mle 1946/56); for formal occasions, a light summer version in white cotton was also issued, which eventually became the standard FARK full dress uniform. The open-collar jacket had two pleated breast pockets closed by pointed flaps and two unpleated at the side closed by straight ones whilst the sleeves had false turnbacks; the front fly and pocket flaps were secured by gilt buttons. This uniform was worn with a matching Khaki shirt and black tie on service dress whereas the white version was worn with a white shirt and a black tie instead. Some AVRK officers also wore a light Khaki British-style, long-sleeved KD bush jacket which had two pleated breast pockets closed by scalloped flaps and two unpleated at the side closed by straight ones, a five-button front fly, shoulder straps, and an integral cloth waistband.

In 1955–56, AVRK officers adopted a new distinctive Air Force Blue overseas dress uniform, consisting of a tunic and slacks modelled after the U.S. Air Force M1947 service dress. On active service, the blue dress uniform was worn with a light blue shirt and Air Force Blue tie, replaced on formal occasions by a white shirt and black tie. The American-style open-collar, four-buttoned tunic had two pleated breast pockets closed by pointed flaps and two unpleated pockets at the side closed by straight flaps (senior officers' tunics sometimes had their side pockets closed by pointed flaps instead). The front fly and pocket flaps were secured by gilt buttons bearing the standard FARK emblem, replaced after March 1970 by the FANK emblem; a short-sleeved light blue shirt was worn in lieu of the tunic on hot weather. A light Air Force Blue working uniform, consisting of a shirt and pants whose cut followed that of the earlier M1945 "Chino" tropical dress, was also adopted for all-ranks. A second version of this uniform was also issued, consisting of a Air Force Blue French Army-style M1948 shirt (Chemise de toile Mle 1948) which featured a six-buttoned front, two pleated breast pockets closed by pointed flaps, shoulder straps (Epaulettes) and long sleeves with buttoned cuffs; both the M1945 and M1948 shirts were worn with the matching Air Force Blue "Chino" trousers. AVRK ground personnel in the field often wore the standard ARK French all-arms M1947 drab green fatigues (Treillis de combat Mle 1947). Female personnel were issued light blue and working Air Force Blue short-sleeved blouses based on their male counterparts' versions, except that the blouses' front fly closed on the left side, and were worn with a matching Air Force Blue knee-length skirt. After March 1970, as part of the U.S.-sponsored MAP re-equipment program, the AVNK was supplied with new American olive green tropical uniforms, the U.S. Army OG-107 utilities and the M1967 Jungle Utility Uniform for its ground personnel and airfield security battalions and pilot student cadets (EPKs) attending courses at the Battambang Air Academy, though they never replaced entirely the older French fatigue clothing. Olive green U.S. M-1951 field jackets were also issued to all-ranks.

Pilots were issued Khaki and Olive Green (OG) flight suits, with both French and US patterns being worn, though the KAF eventually standartized on the US K-2B Olive Green Flying Coveralls in 1970–71. Privately purchased Thai camouflaged flight suits in "Highland" pattern were worn by Khmer Air Force Douglas AC-47D Spooky gunship aircrews on occasion, such as the members of the first contingent sent in May–June 1971 to Udorn Airbase in Thailand for gunship training. A U.S. Air Force survival mesh vest was usually worn with the flight suits after 1970.

=== Headgear ===
AVRK officers received the early ARK service peaked cap in both light khaki and white-topped versions, which was copied after the French M1927 pattern (Casquette d'officier Mle 1927) to wear with either the light khaki or white service dress uniforms. The peaked caps were worn with the standard gilt metal FARK cap device bearing the Cambodian Royal Arms. Ground and flight personnel generally wore the standard ARK headgear of the period, which consisted of French M1946 and M1957 light khaki sidecaps (Bonnet de police de toile kaki clair Mle 1946 and Bonnet de police de toile kaki clair Mle 1957), M1946 tropical berets (Bérét de toile kaki clair Mle 1946), M1949 bush hats (Chapeau de brousse Mle 1949) and light khaki cotton baseball cap-style field caps.

In 1956, the AVRK adopted a new Air Force Blue service peaked cap with crown of "Germanic" shape – very similar to that worn by Royal Lao Air Force (RLAF) or Republic of Vietnam Air Force (VNAF) officers –, with a gold braid chinstrap, black cap band, and black lacquered leather peak (edged gold for general officers). It was initially worn with the standard gilt metal FARK cap device, replaced after March 1970 by a distinctive AVNK/KAF silver cap badge. An Air Force Blue overseas flight cap (with silver cord piping in the flap for officers) styled after the French M1957 sidecap, was also adopted; after 1970 it was sometimes worn with a miniature metal or cloth embroidered version of the AVNK/KAF cap badge.

Besides regulation headgear, unofficial Olive Green and camouflage baseball caps (black or red embroidered versions were adopted by some Cambodian pilots who attended advanced courses abroad) and U.S. Boonie hats found their way into the KAF from the United States, Thailand and South Vietnam, to which were soon added Cambodian-made copies; privately purchased civilian bucket hats in Khaki or OG cotton cloth were also used. The pilot student cadets and the airmen serving in the airfield security battalions retained as service headgear the old M1946 khaki tropical beret worn with the miniature AVNK/KAF cap badge, whilst the latter were also issued steel helmets, in the form of the U.S. M-1 and the French M1951 NATO (Casque modéle 1951 OTAN), standard issue in the ARK/ANK.

=== Footwear ===
White and brown low laced leather shoes were prescribed to wear with either the white summer dress and the earlier AVRK khaki service/work uniform for all-ranks and after 1956, black ones were required for Air Force officers wearing the new Air Force Blue officers' dress uniform on formal occasions. On service dress, all Air Force ground personnel wore brown leather U.S. M-1943 Combat Service Boots and French M1953 "Rangers" (Rangers modéle 1953) or French Pataugas olive canvas-and-rubber jungle boots, white low tennis shoes, flip-flops and leather peasant sandals. After March 1970, the KAF standardized on American M-1967 black leather boots with DMS "ripple" pattern rubbler sole and Jungle boots, Canadian Bata tropical boots and South Vietnamese black canvas-and-rubber Indigenous Combat Boots, which replaced much of the older combat footwear.

=== Air Force ranks ===
The AVRK used the same standard FARK/FANK French-style rank chart as the Army, though differing in some of its nomenclature and in color details. Flag and senior officers' (Officiers généraux, officiers supérieurs et officiers subalternes) ranks were worn on light blue removable shoulder boards (with gold laurel-like leaf embroidery on the outer edge for generals) or shoulder strap slides, both with a miniature royal coat-of-arms featuring a winged crown device on the inner end; NCO and airmen (Sous-officiers et aviateurs) ranks were worn on both upper sleeves. On the field uniform, officers' ranks were worn on chest tabs in lieu of the shoulder strap slides; Army-style metal or cloth chevrons pinned to the chest were worn by NCOs whilst airmen (Hommes de troupe) wore no insignia. After March 1970 the AVNK adopted black shoulder boards and shoulder strap slides with a pair of stylised wings at the inner end, which replaced the earlier royal crest, but the basic rank sequence remained unchanged. In 1972, some KAF officers began wearing on their flight suits or OG jungle fatigues metal pin-on collar rank insignia identical to the pattern adopted that same year by their Army counterparts.

=== Rank insignia ===
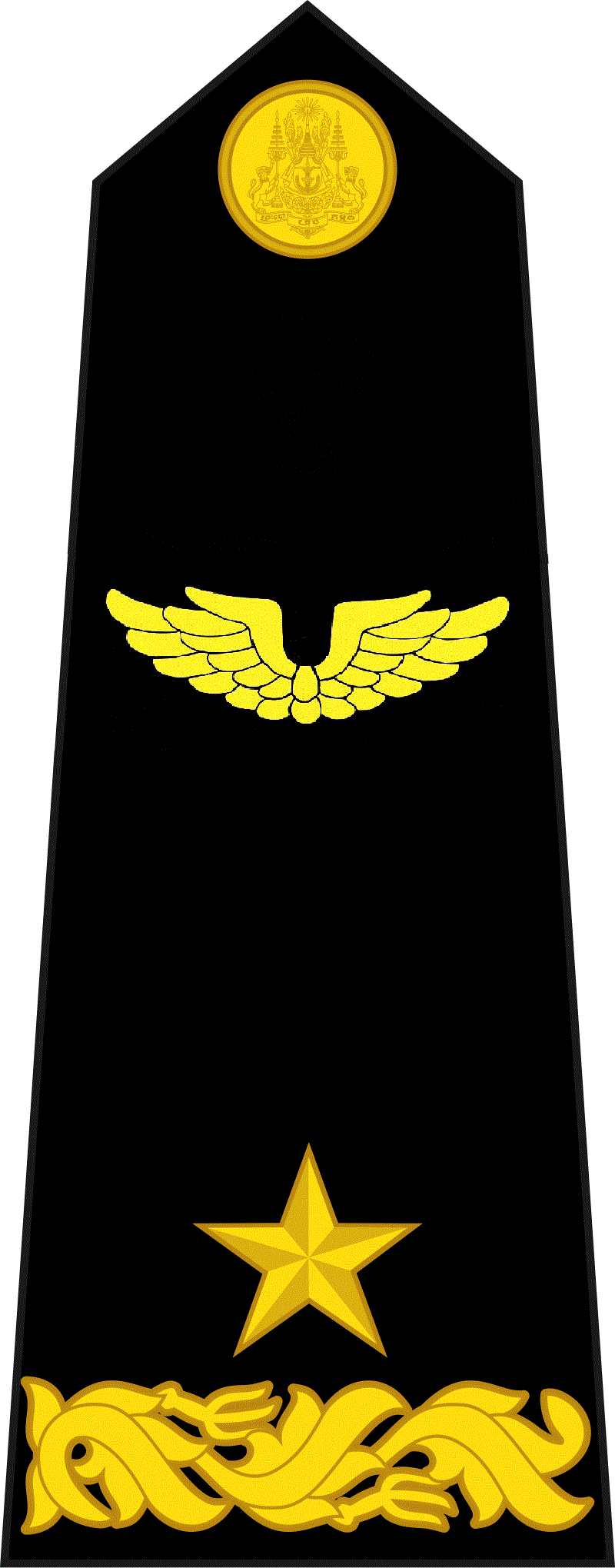
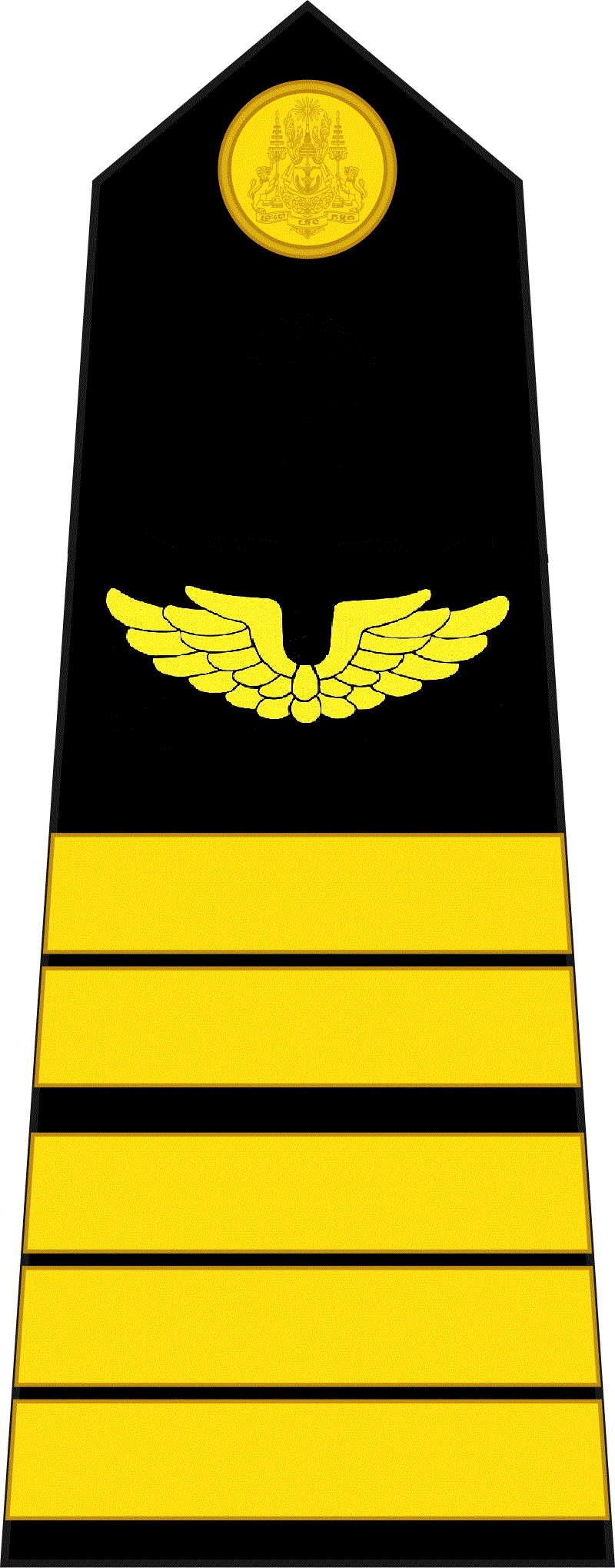
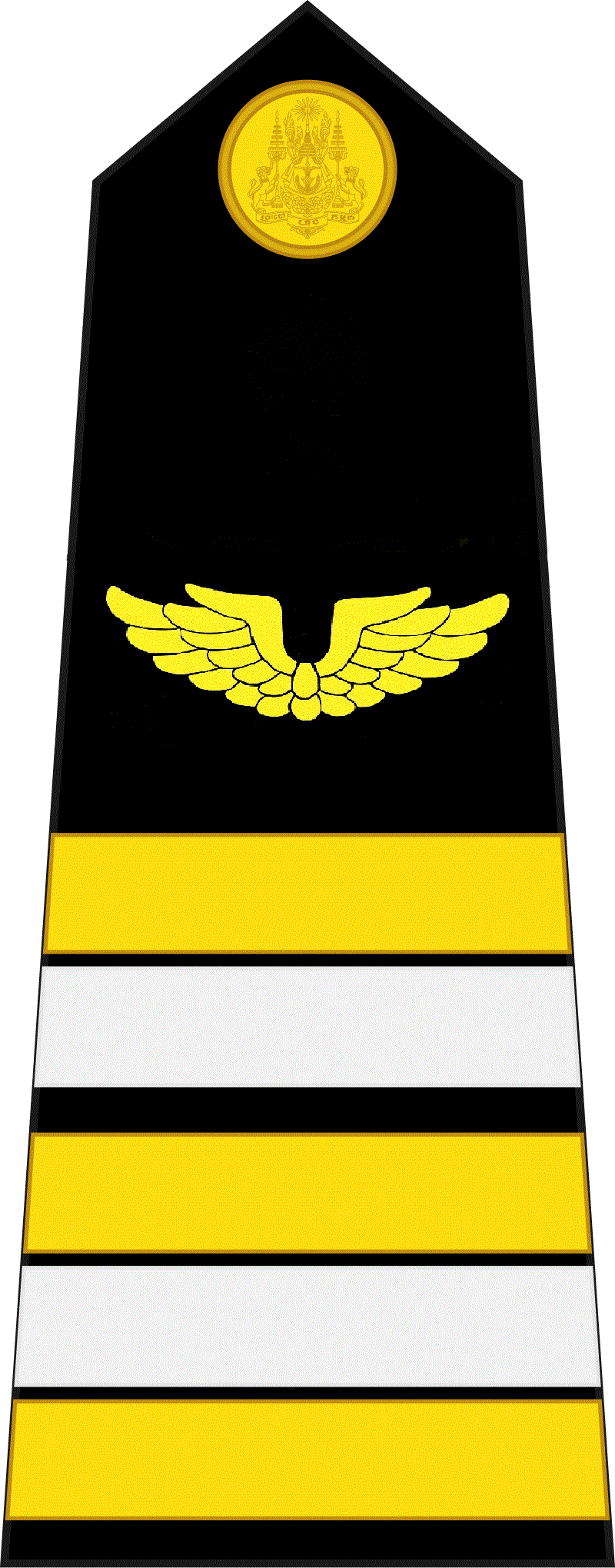
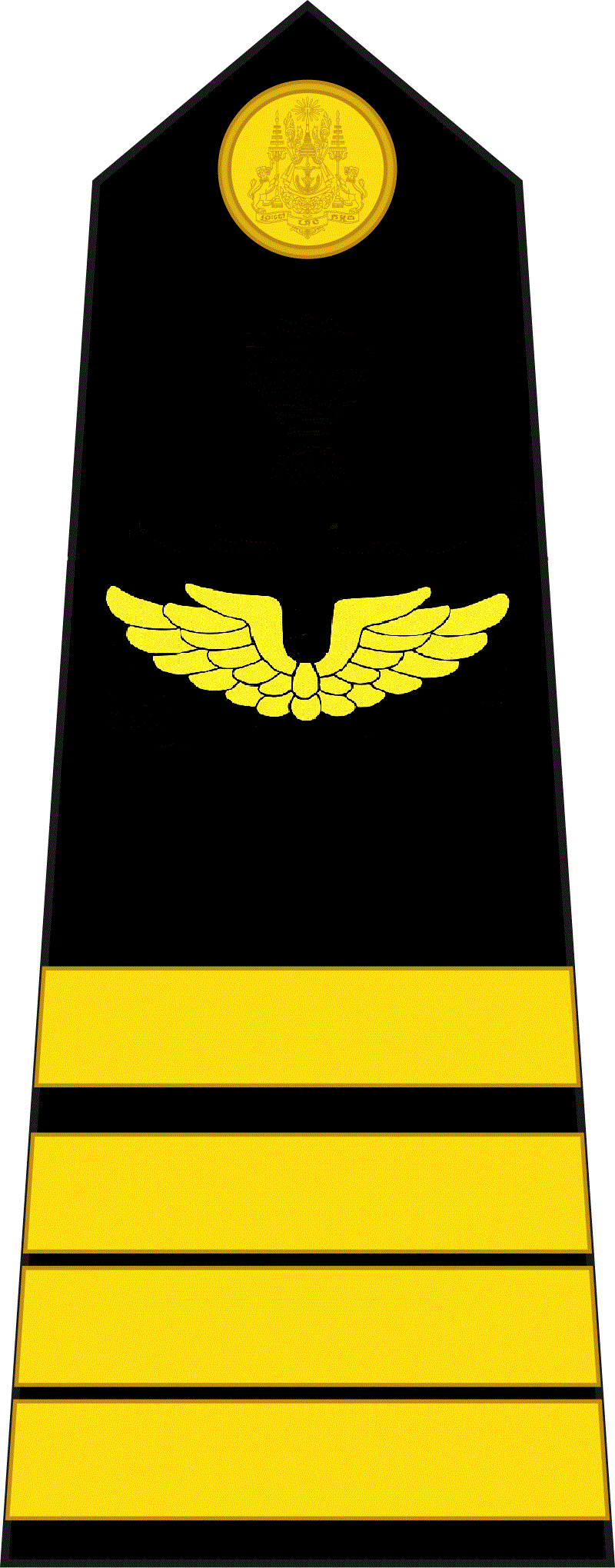
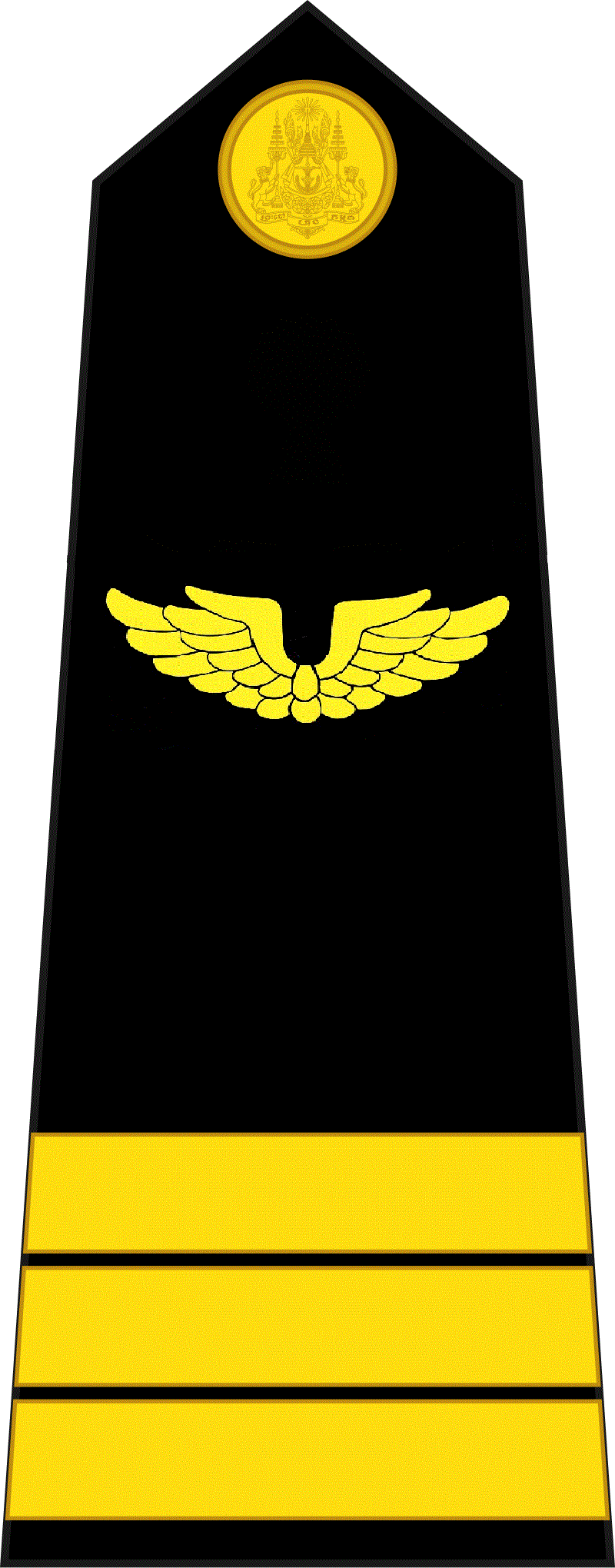
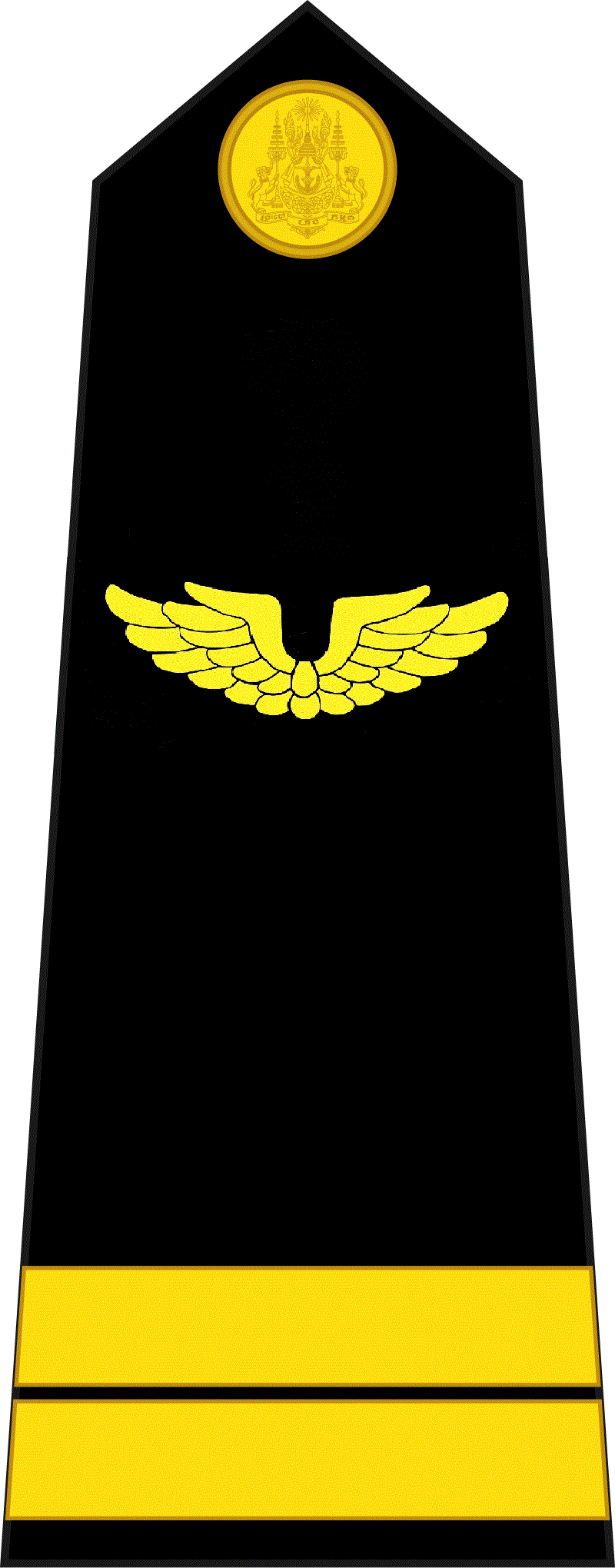
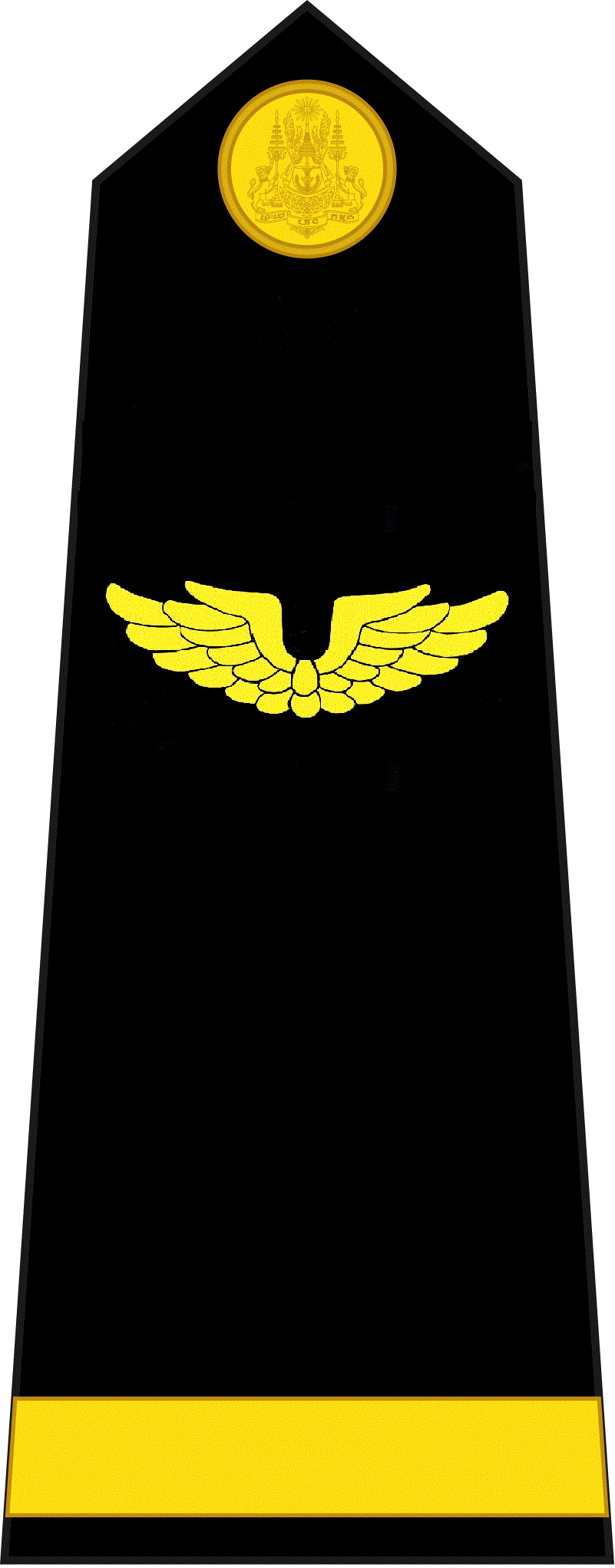
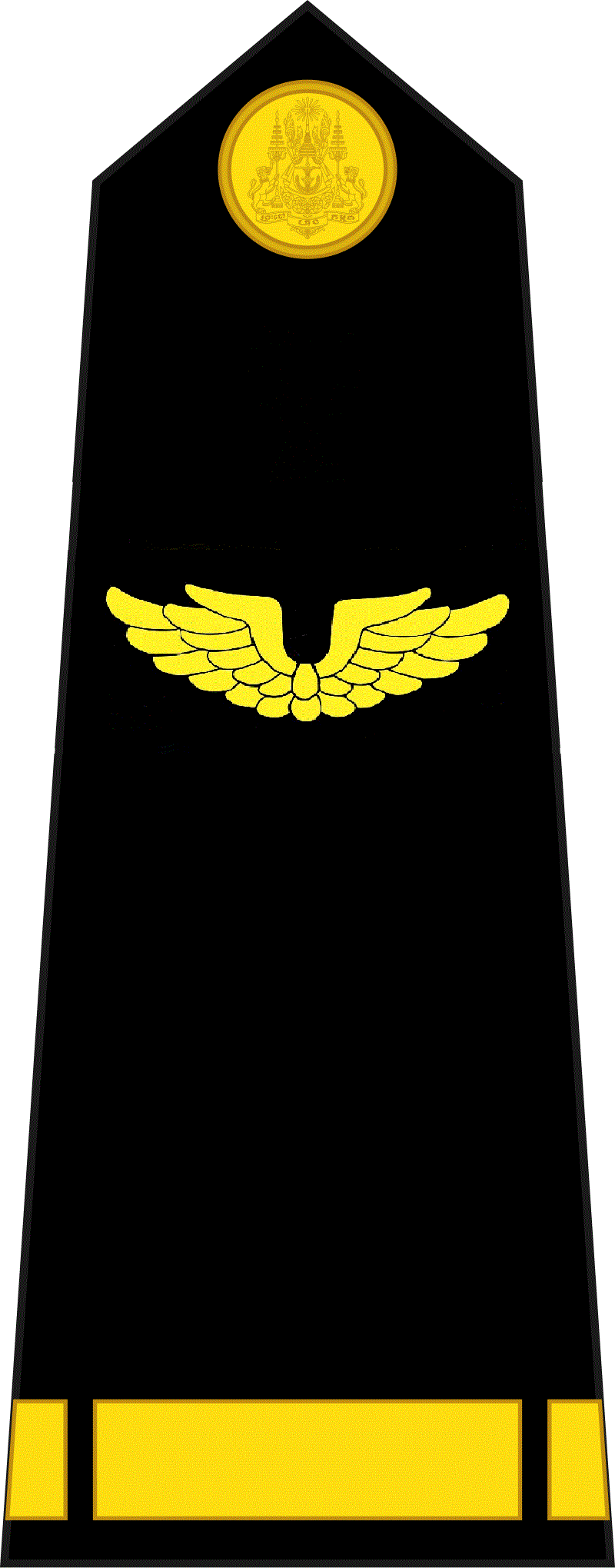
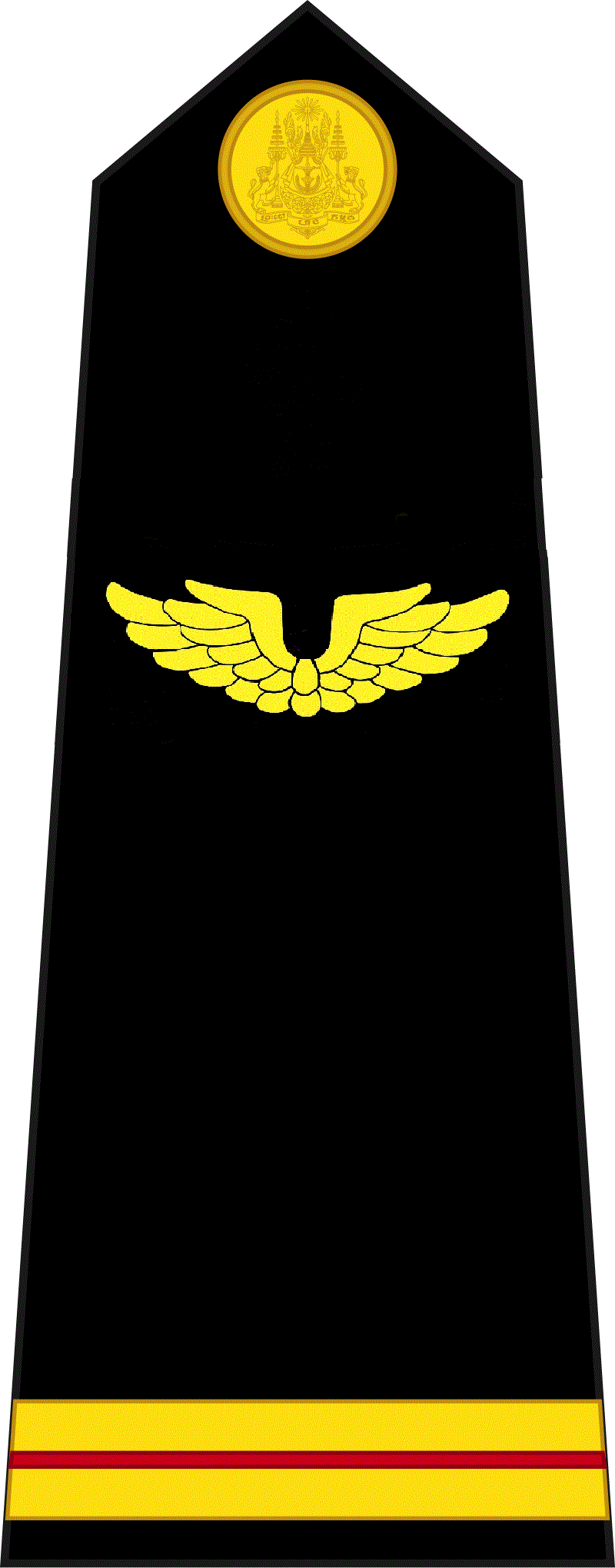
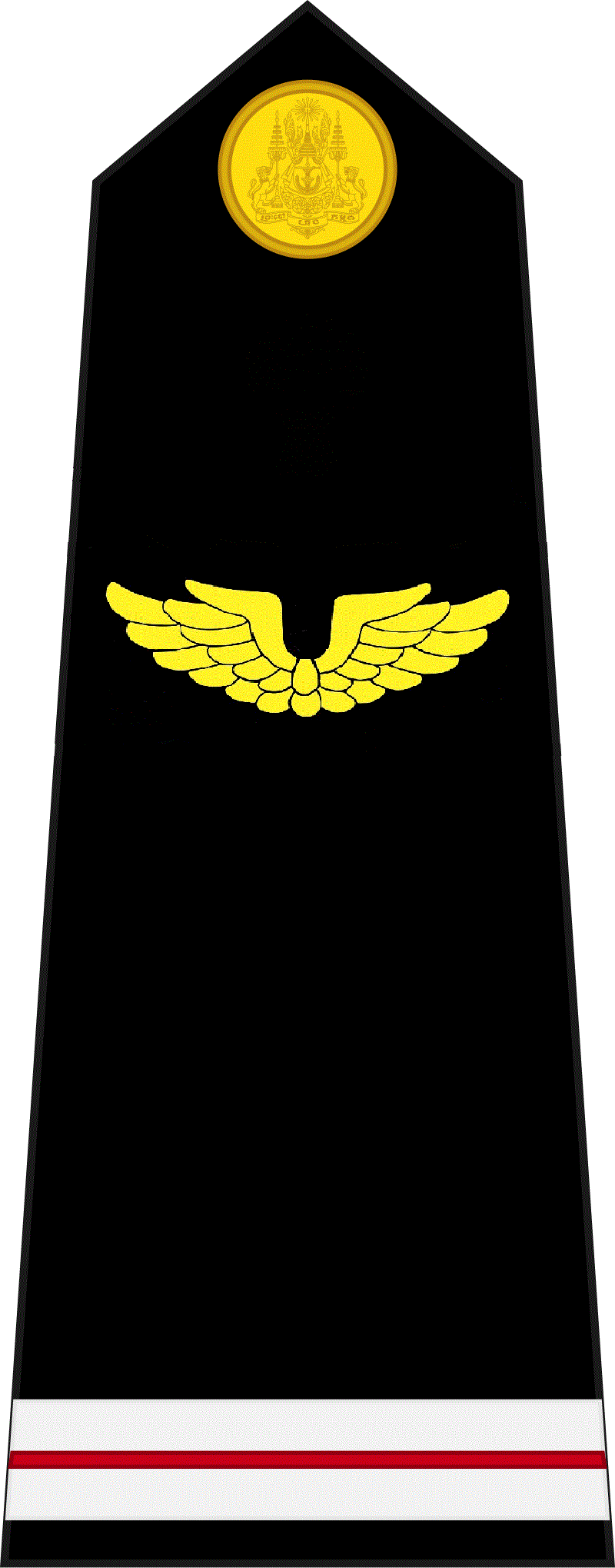
(Khmer Republic) Khmer Air Force
(Khmer Republic) Khmer Air Force	Général de brigade aérienne Utdɑm trəy	Colonel; Vorak aek	Lieutenant-Colonel; Vorak too	Commandant; Vorak trəy	Capitaine; Aknu aek	Lieutenant; Aknu too	Sous-lieutenant; Aknu trəy	Aspirant; Prɨn baal aek	Adjudant-chef; Prɨn baal too	Adjudant; Pʊəl baal aek

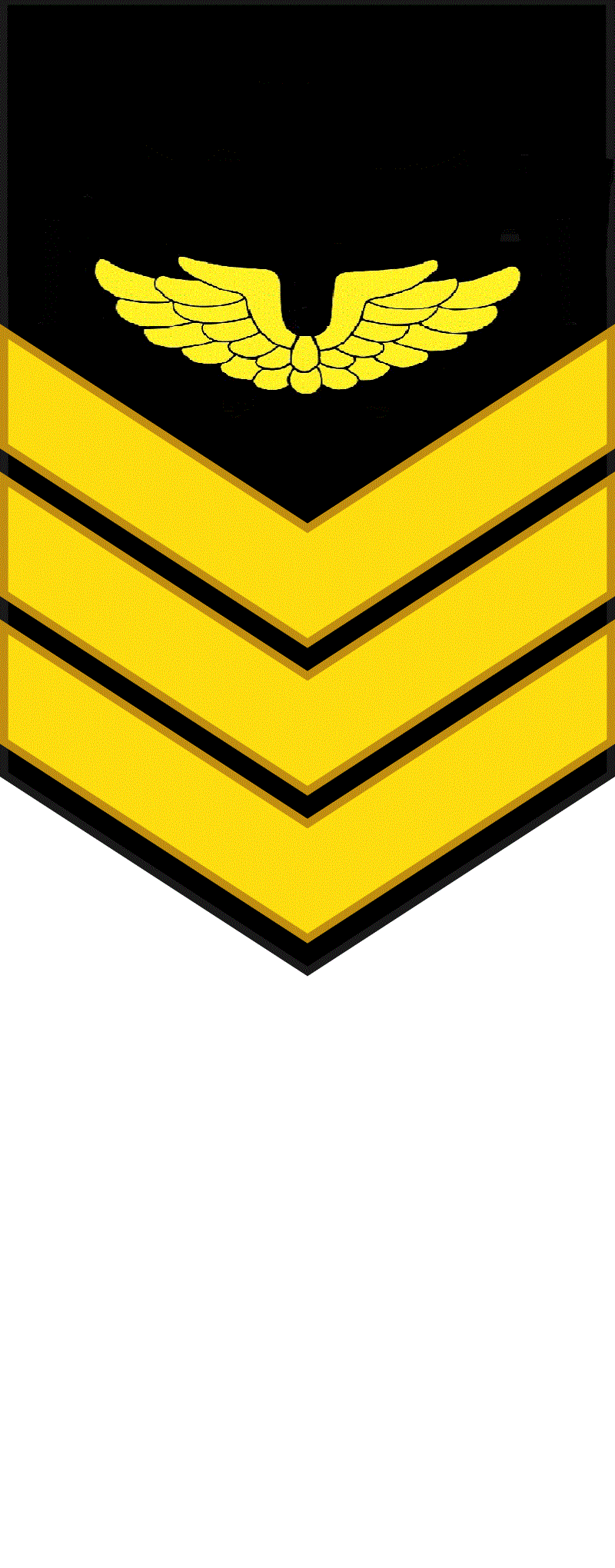
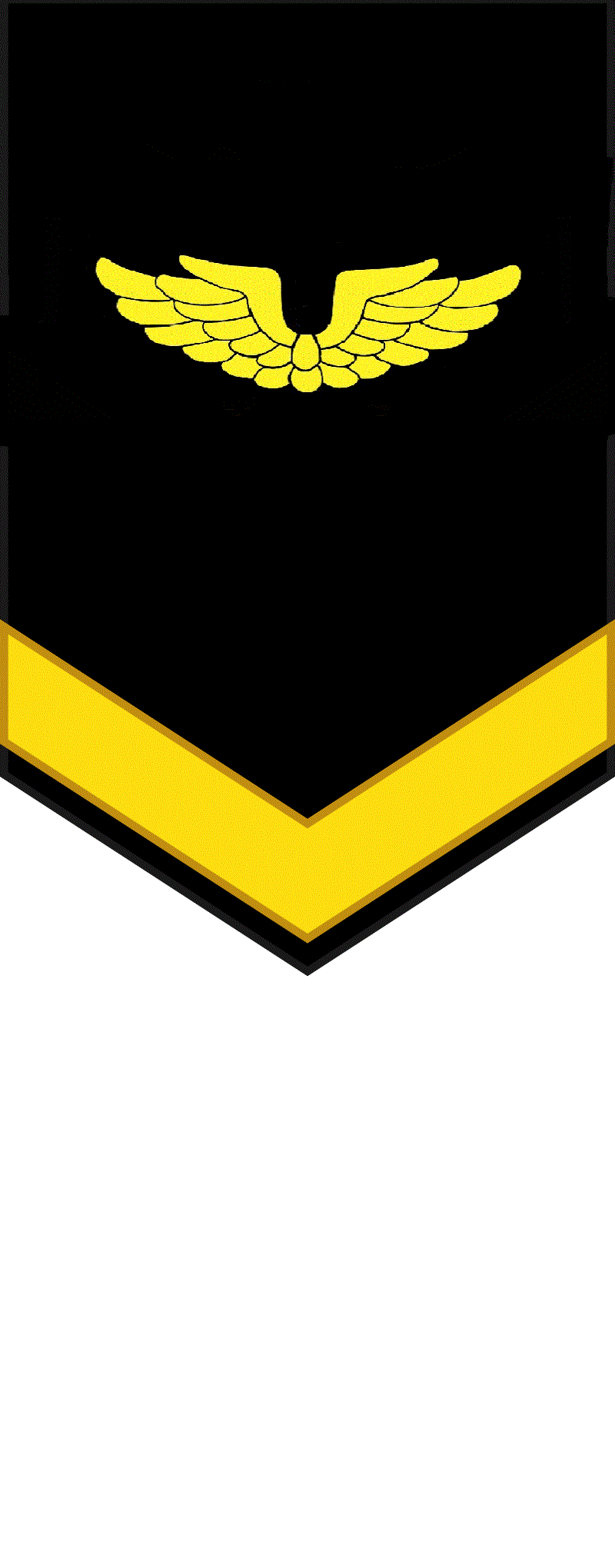
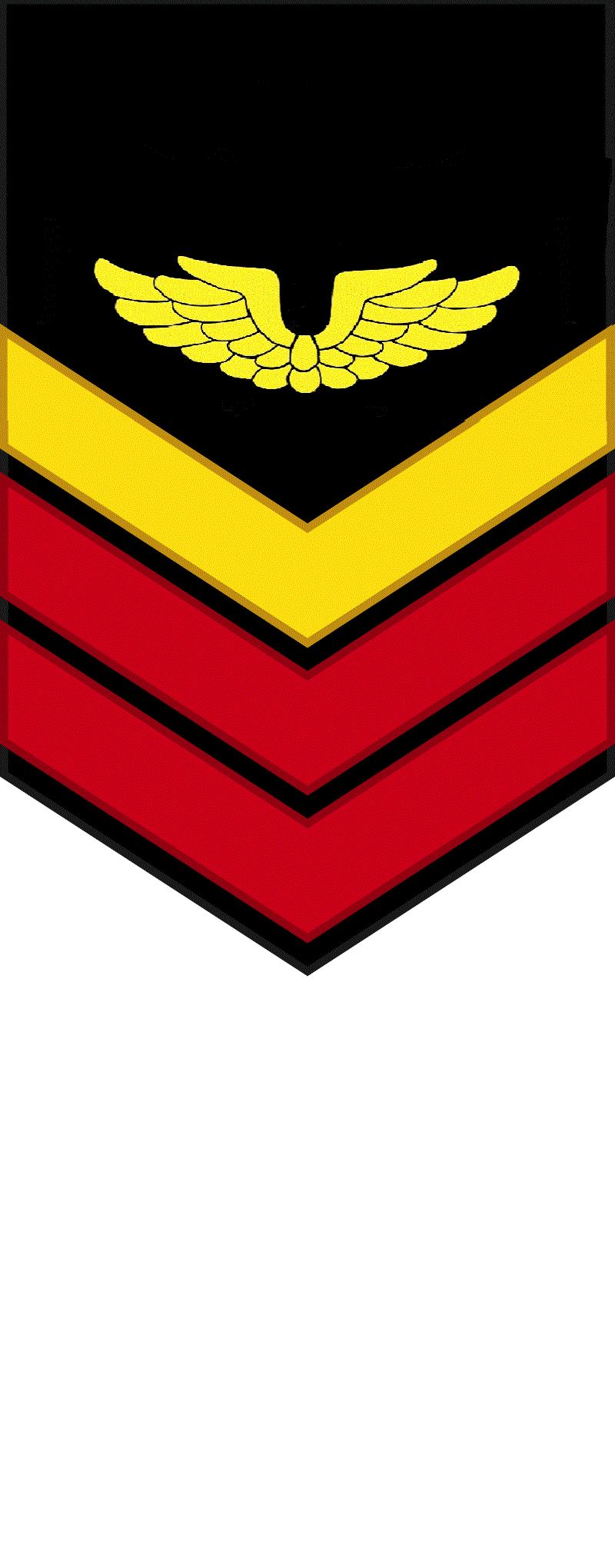
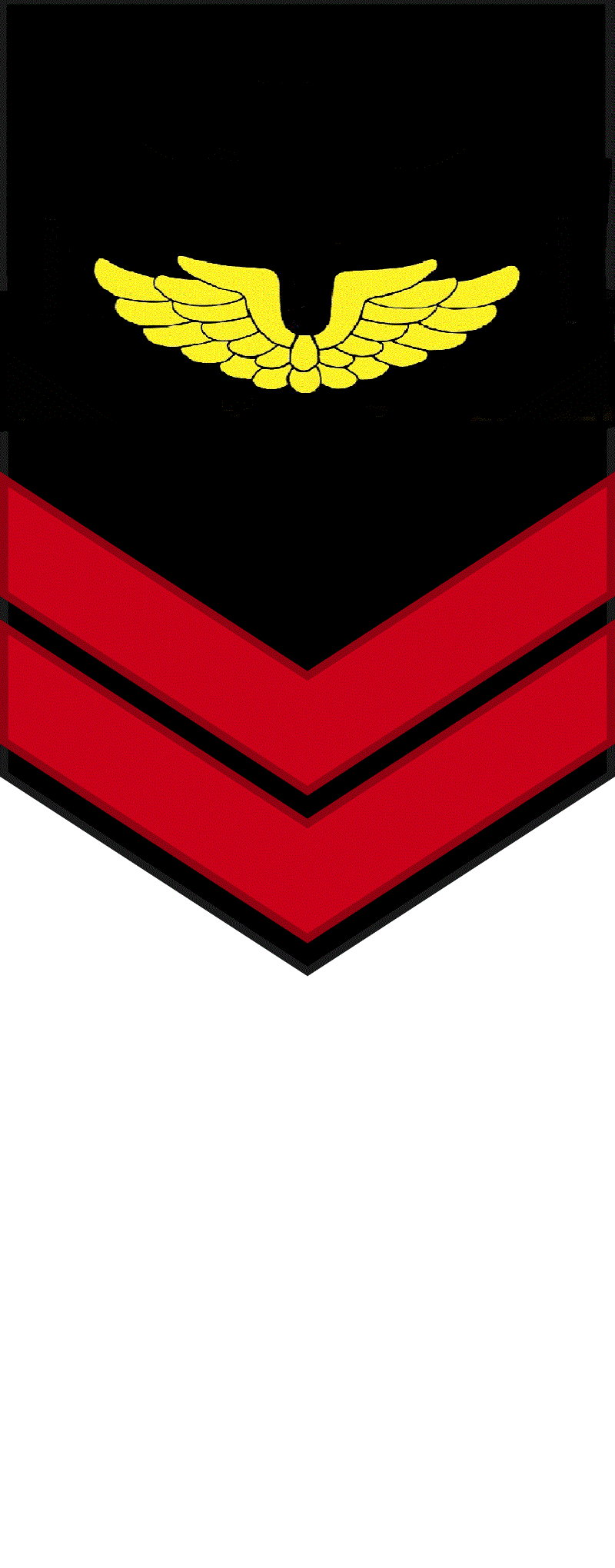
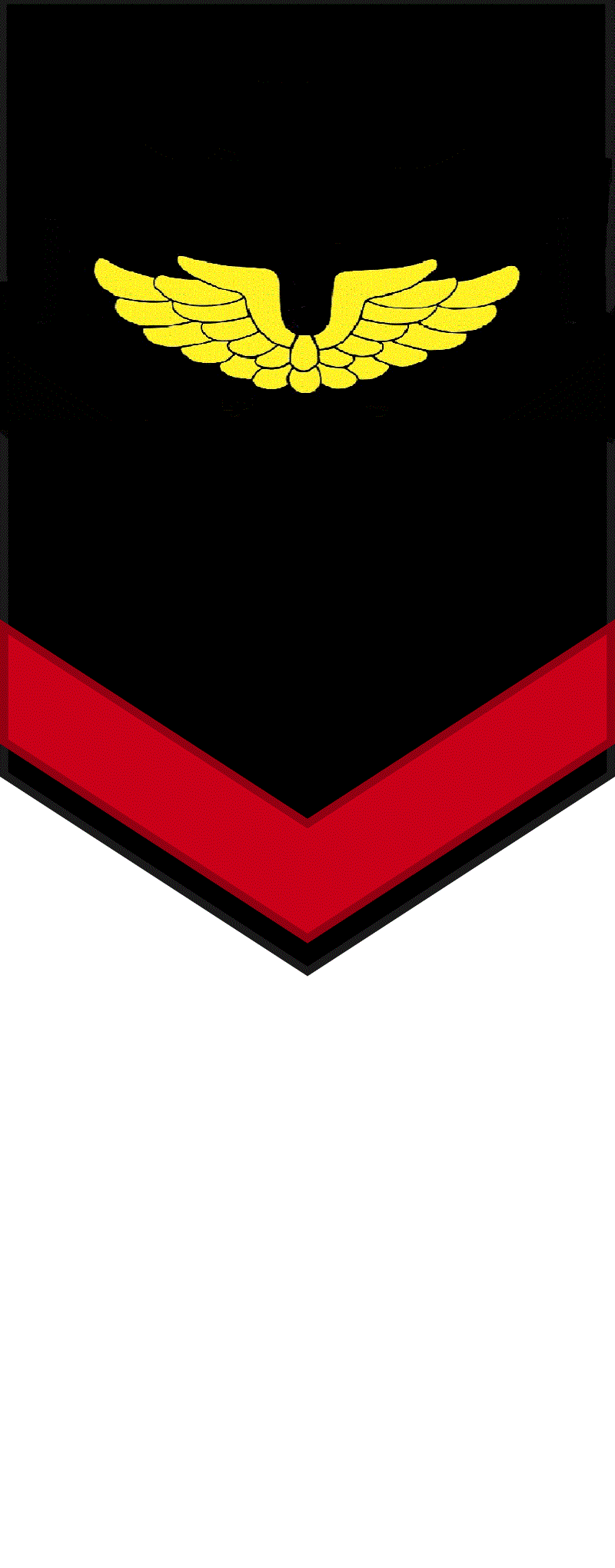
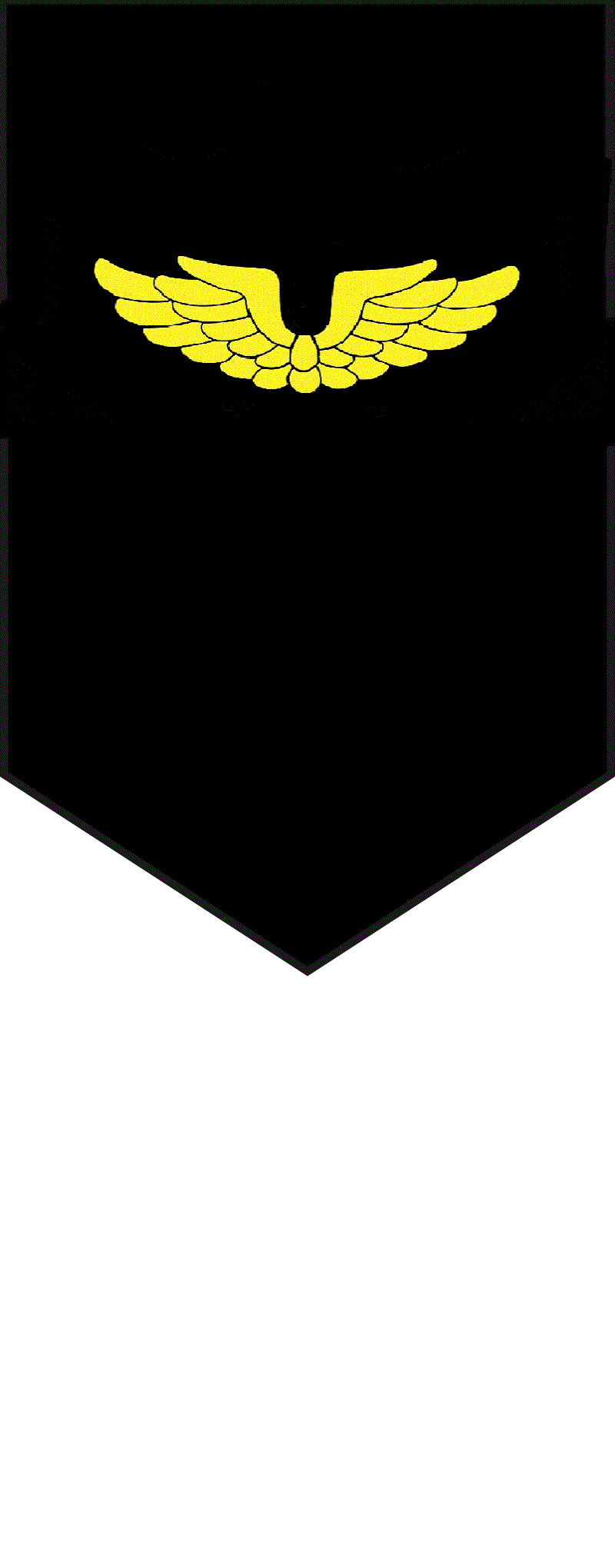
(Khmer Republic) Khmer Air Force
(Khmer Republic) Khmer Air Force	Sergent-chef; Pʊəl baal too	Sergent; Pʊəl baal trəy	Caporal-chef; Niey aek	Caporal; Niey too	Aviateur de première classe Pʊəl aek	Aviateur de deuxième classe Pʊəl too

=== Insignia ===
AVRK personnel wore over the left pocket of their working or fatigue shirts a gold metal badge, consisting of a pair of wings surmounted by a royal crown. After 1970 it was replaced by an AVNK/KAF cloth embroidered badge, featuring a yellow winged Angkor Wat temple motif surmounted by three stars on a blue background. A pilot's qualification badge was created in the mid-1950s, its early design consisting of a simple gold metal circle bearing a stylised Hongsa, a mythical Cambodian swan. This badge was replaced in the 1960s by a more elaborated version that featured a gilt swan inserted on a silvered wreath. Both versions were worn on the left breast of the service dress and working uniforms. KAF airmen sent for training overseas wore on the upper right sleeve of their flight suits and working shirts a Cambodian national emblem with "Air Force" or "Khmer Air Force" tab, or a simple rectangular flash based on the design of the Republican flag bearing "Khmer Republic" inscribed in either French or Khmer script. Fighter-bomber pilots wore on the back of their flight suits a "blood-chit" patterned after the Cambodian national flag, inscribed with a plea for the bearer to be treated has a Prisoner of war (POW) according to international agreements in Khmer script, with Vietnamese and Chinese translations also included.

Cloth blue and subdued nametapes were worn over the right shirt or jacket pocket on field dress and flight suits; blue plastic nameplates with white lettering were occasionally worn with the Air Force Blue overseas service dress and the working uniform. Specialized support services within the Khmer Air Force wore full-colour cloth embroidered, woven or printed round and squared- or shield-shaped insignia on their upper left sleeve, whilst airmen serving in the airfield security battalions were entitled to wear collar tabs featuring two yellow crossed rifles embroidered on a blue cloth background also outlined in yellow. KAF headquarters and airbase insignia went to the upper left sleeve. The placement of squadron insignia varied, with pilots wearing full-colour round, hexagonal, or shield-shaped patches on the upper left sleeve or over the right pocket of their flight suits.

== See also ==
- Air America
- Battle of Kampot
- Cambodian Civil War
- Forward air controllers
- Kampuchean People's Revolutionary Armed Forces
- Khmer Republic
- Khmer Rouge
- Khmer National Armed Forces
- List of weapons of the Cambodian Civil War
- Operation Eagle Pull
- Operation Freedom Deal
- Operation Menu
- Operation Patio
- Republic of Vietnam Air Force
- Royal Cambodian Armed Forces
- Royal Cambodian Air Force
- Royal Lao Air Force
