= Kampong Cham =

Kampong Cham may refer to these places in Cambodia:

- Kampong Cham province
- Kampong Cham (city)
- Kampong Cham municipality
- Kampong Cham Commune
- Kampong Cham Airport
- Kampong Cham (National Assembly constituency)
- Apostolic Prefecture of Kompong Cham
