= So Satto =

Cambodian Air Force general (1933–2010)

- សូ សាតូ
- Born: July 1933; Takeo, Cambodia
- Died: November 2010 (aged 77); Paris, France
- Military career
- Allegiance: First Kingdom of Cambodia (1954-1970); Khmer Republic (Cambodia) (1970-1975)
- Branch: Khmer Air Force
- Service years: 1954–1975
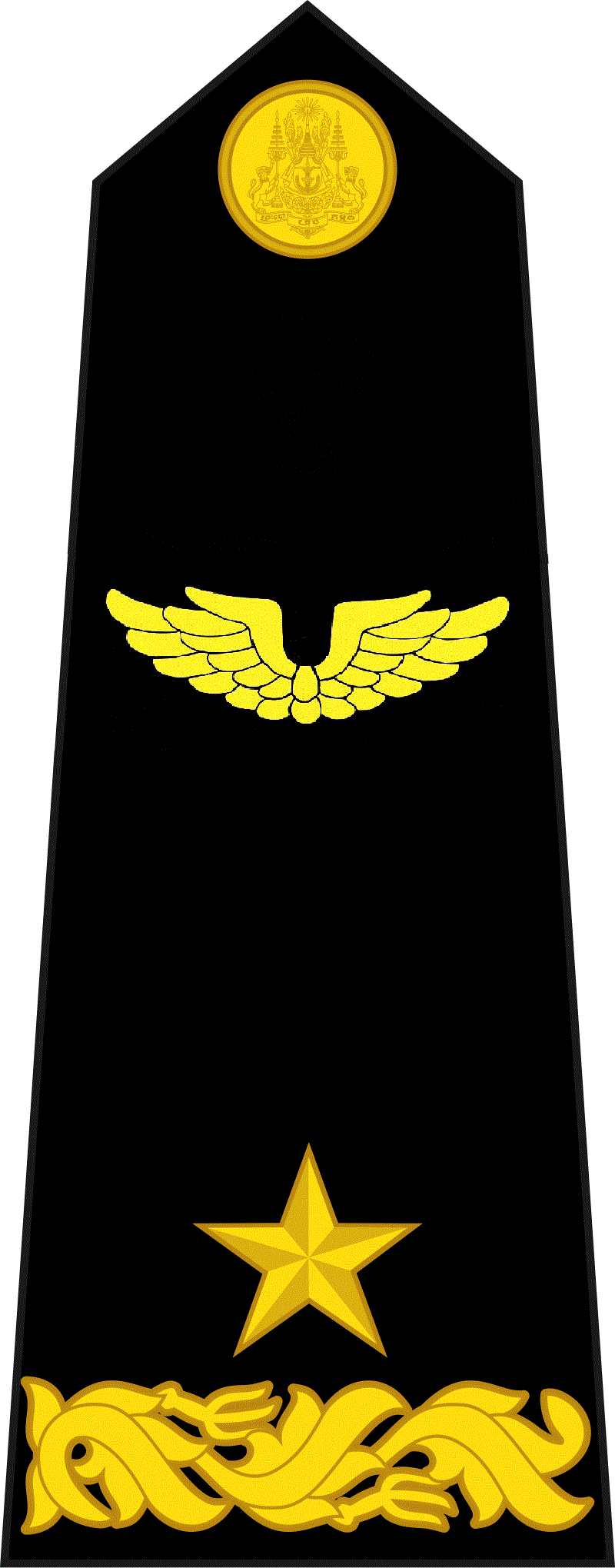
- Rank: Brigadier general
- Commands: Khmer Air Force
- Conflicts: Cambodian Civil War; Vietnam War

Brigadier general So Satto (July 1933 – November 2010) was an officer of the Khmer Air Force (KAF) who played a significant role in the development and expansion of Cambodia's air arm during the Khmer Republic era between 1970 and 1975.

== Early life and training ==
After graduating from the Royal Khmer Air School in 1954, So Satto entered the École de l'air at Salon-de-Provence, France (Class of 1955). He obtained his transport pilot wings in 1959 at Avord Air Base, France, and completed the full French Air Force pilot training curriculum by 1961.

Returning to Cambodia, he served successively as a transport pilot, commander of the Transport Group, commander of a tactical air group, and air base commander. In 1969, he was appointed Deputy Commander of the Royal Khmer Aviation (AVRK), the air service of the Royal Khmer Army (ARK).

== Rise to command ==
In 1965, Prince Norodom Sihanouk severed diplomatic relations with the United States and moved closer to the People's Republic of China and North Vietnam. This realignment of Cambodia's foreign policy toward communist countries, initiated in 1964, along with the establishment of People's Army of Vietnam (PAVN) and Viet Cong (VC) sanctuaries along the Ho Chi Minh trail, contributed to Sihanouk's overthrow by the National Assembly in March 1970. Following these events, So Satto was appointed Chief of Staff of the new Khmer National Aviation (AVNK), which at the time was subordinate to the Cambodian Army command.

== Expansion of air operations ==
Following North Vietnamese offensives against the new government, So Satto mobilized all available aircrew, including pilots from the national airline, established a second air base, and implemented accelerated training programs across all areas of aviation. Despite operating a heterogeneous inventory, the AVNK flew as many sorties in a single week as it had during the previous sixteen years. Due to personnel shortages, transport aircraft sometimes took off with only a single pilot.

On the night of 21-22 January 1971, a hundred or so-strong PAVN "Sapper" Commando force (Đặc Công, equivalent of "spec op" in English) managed to pass undetected through the defensive perimeter of the Special Military Region (Région Militaire Speciale – RMS) set by the Cambodian Army around Phnom Penh and carried out a spectacular raid on Pochentong airbase, resulting in the destruction of approximately two-thirds of the AVNK's inventory on the ground. With support from the United States and Australia, the AVNK was re-equipped with US-made aircraft.

The attack was ultimately described by U.S. officials as "a blessing", as the aircraft previously supplied by Eastern Bloc countries had become unusable due to a lack of spare parts.

== Creation of the Khmer Air Force ==
The United States remained reluctant to expand a Cambodian air force considered costly and strategically unnecessary. Nevertheless, in June 1971, So Satto succeeded in obtaining institutional independence from the Army. The aviation branch was officially reorganized as the Khmer Air Force (Armée de l'Air Khmère, KAF).

He established partnerships with science universities to recruit doctors and engineers, opened three additional air bases, and sought military assistance from other frendly nations, including discreetly bringing in Taiwanese flight instructors to relieve the Khmer training staff.

== Later career and exile ==
On March 17, 1973, a disgruntled pro-Sihanouk KAF pilot, Captain So Patra, flew his T-28D fighter-bomber into downtown Phnom Penh and made a sudden dive-bomb attack over the Presidential Palace at the Chamkarmon District. A total of 43 people were killed and another 35 injured in the bombing, after which the pilot flew to Hainan Island in the South China Sea. This incident led to the dismissal of Brig. Gen. So Satto, being subsequently appointed Defense Attaché at the Cambodian Embassy in Washington, D.C.

After the Fall of Phnom Penh to the Khmer Rouge in April 1975, he requested political asylum in France, where he lived until his death in November 2010.

== Works ==
- So Satto, Carnet de vol d'un pilote khmer: Un autre regard sur le Cambodge post-colonial avant la grande tragédie, Independently Published, Paris 2024. ISBN 978-2-9590065-1-7 (in French)

== See also ==
- Cambodian Civil War
- Khmer Air Force
- Khmer National Armed Forces
- List of weapons of the Cambodian Civil War
- Vietnam War
