= Kampong Cham Airport =

Kâmpóng Cham Airport
- IATA: KCA; ICAO: VDKC

Summary
- Airport type: Public
- Serves: Kâmpóng Cham
- Location: Cambodia
- Elevation AMSL: 52 ft / 16 m
- Coordinates: 12°1′43.9″N 105°26′28.7″E

Map
- Location of Kâmpóng Cham Airport in Cambodia

Runways
Direction	Length		Surface
Direction	ft	m	Surface
05/23	3,900	1,189	Asphalt
- Source: Landings.com

Kâmpóng Cham Airport (ICAO: KCA) is a public use airport located near Kâmpóng Cham, Kâmpóng Cham, Cambodia.

== See also ==
- List of airports in Cambodia
