= 1972 Cambodian general election =

- September 1972
- National Assembly
- All 126 seats in the National Assembly; 64 seats needed for a majority
Party	Leader	Vote %	Seats
PRS	Lon Nol	99.02	126
This lists parties that won seats. See the complete results below.
- Senate
- 32 of the 40 seats in the Senate; 21 seats needed for a majority
Party	Leader	Vote %	Seats
PRS	Lon Nol	95.82	32
This lists parties that won seats. See the complete results below.
Prime Minister before	Prime Minister after
Sơn Ngọc Thành; KS	Hang Thun Hak; PRS

General elections were held in the Khmer Republic in September 1972, the first after the 1970 coup d'état. Elections for the National Assembly took place on 3 September and were contested by the Social Republican Party and Pracheachon (although the latter only had 10 candidates), whilst they were boycotted by the Republican Party and the Democratic Party in protest at the new electoral law. The SRP won all 126 seats with 99.1% of valid votes. Elections for the Senate were held on 17 September, with the SRP winning all 32 seats.

== Results ==
=== National Assembly ===
Party	Votes	%	Seats	+/–
Social Republican Party	1,304,207	99.02	126	New
Pracheachon	12,854	0.98	0	0
Total	1,317,061	100.00	126	+44
Valid votes	1,317,061	99.36		
Invalid/blank votes	8,498	0.64		
Total votes	1,325,559	100.00		
Registered voters/turnout	1,686,900	78.58		
Source: IPU

=== Senate ===
Party	Votes	%	Seats
Social Republican Party	989,196	95.82	32
Pracheachon	43,171	4.18	0
Armed Forces appointees			8
Total	1,032,367	100.00	40
Source: IPU
