= 1972 Cambodian presidential election =

- 4 June 1972
- Turnout: 57.56%
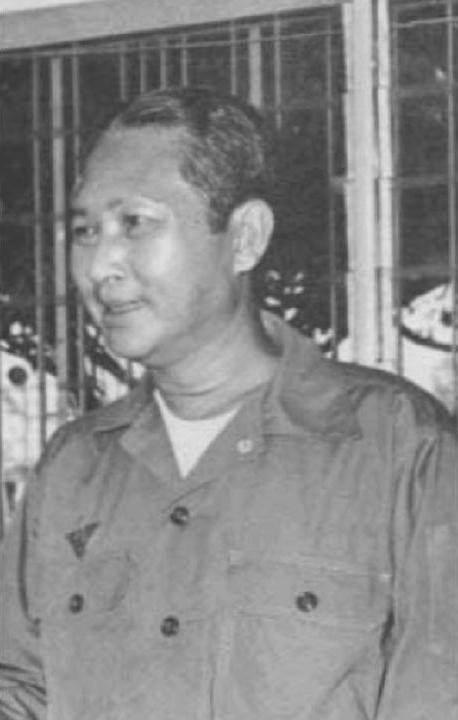

Candidate	Lon Nol	In Tam	Keo An
Party	PRS	Democratic	Republican
Popular vote	578,560	257,496	217,174
Percentage	54.93%	24.45%	20.62%
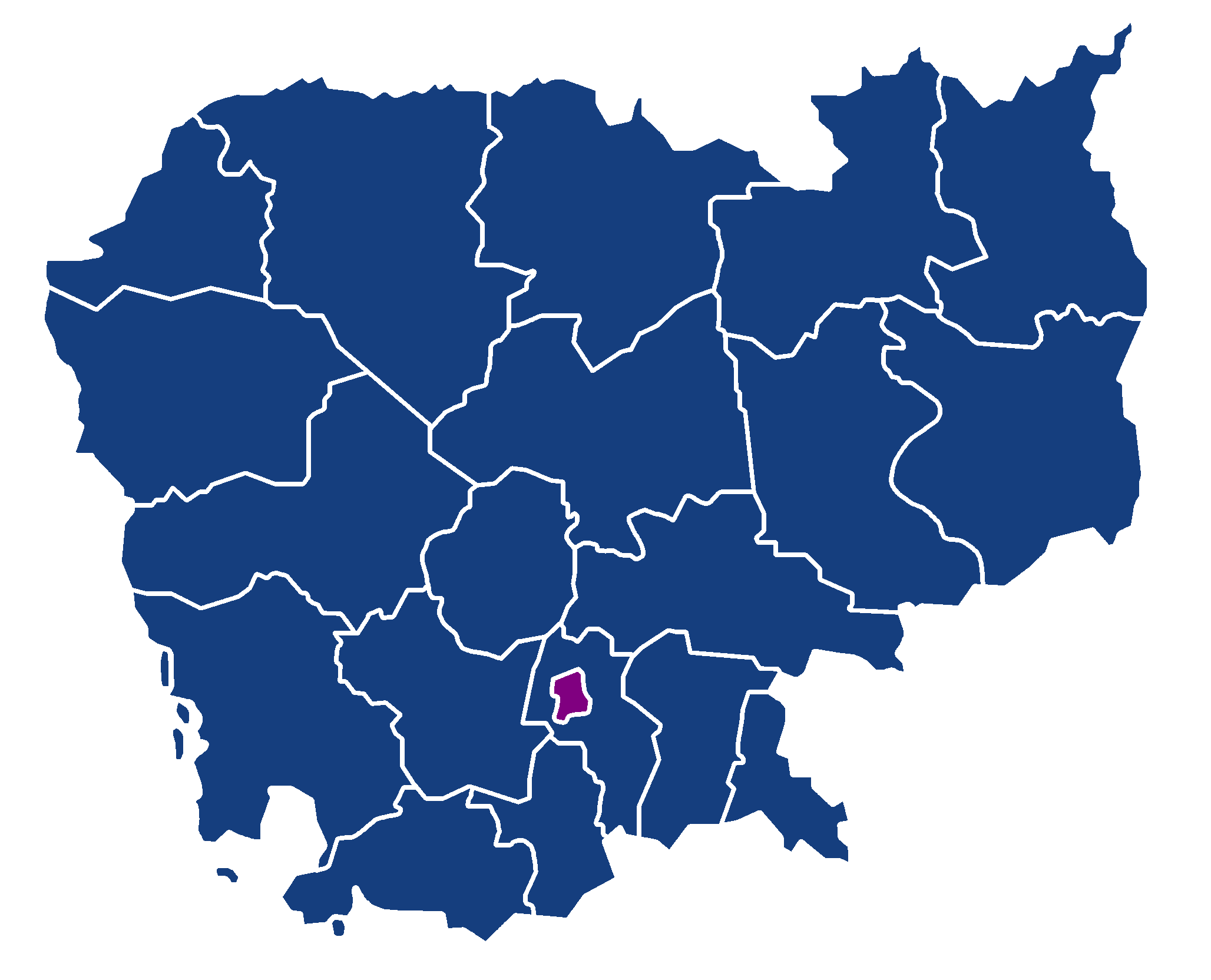
President before election
Lon Nol
PRS
Elected President
Lon Nol
PRS

Presidential elections were held for the first, and only time in Cambodia on 4 June 1972, following the abolition of the monarchy and the declaration of the establishment of the Khmer Republic in the 1970 coup d'état. The result was a victory for Lon Nol, who received 55% of the vote. Voter turnout was 58%.

== Results ==
Candidate	Party	Votes	%
Lon Nol	Social Republican Party	578,560	54.93
In Tam	Democratic Party	257,496	24.45
Keo An	Republican Party	217,174	20.62
Total		1,053,230	100.00
Valid votes		1,053,230	99.41
Invalid/blank votes		6,275	0.59
Total votes		1,059,505	100.00
Registered voters/turnout		1,840,592	57.56
Source: Nohlen et al.
