= Parliament of the Khmer Republic =

Cambodian legislature during the republic

Parliament of the Khmer Republic សភានៃសាធារណរដ្ឋខ្មែរ

Type
- Type: Bicameral
- Houses: Senate; National Assembly

History
- Established: 18 March 1970
- Disbanded: 17 April 1975
- Preceded by: National Assembly
- Succeeded by: Kampuchean People's Representative Assembly

Leadership
- Speaker: In Tam since 18 March 1970
- Seats: 158

Elections
- Senate voting system: Elected directly by civil servants.
- National Assembly voting system: Elected directly by popular sovereignty.

The Parliament of the Khmer Republic (Khmer: សភានៃសាធារណរដ្ឋខ្មែរ, Sâphéa ney Sathéarônârôdth Khmêr) was the official name of the bicameral legislature of Cambodia during the Republican period. Elections were held for 32 members of the Senate and all the members of the National Assembly, newly established pursuant to the Constitution approved by popular referendum on April 30, 1972. It was replaced by Kampuchean People's Representative Assembly of Khmer Rouge.

== Legislature ==
=== Senate ===
The Senate consisted of 40 members elected for 6 years, half of whom were renewable every 3 years. Three-fifths of the Senators were elected indirectly in the country's different regions, one-fifth by the civil administration, and the remaining fifth by the Council of the Armed Forces.

=== National Assembly ===
The National Assembly consisted of 126 members elected directly for 4 years by popular sovereignty.

== Electoral system ==
All citizens of either sex who are at least 18 years of age, registered on the electoral lists and in full possession of their civil rights were entitled to vote for members of the National Assembly. The age requirement is 40 to vote for Senators. Electoral lists were revised every 4 years and voting was not compulsory.

=== Elections ===
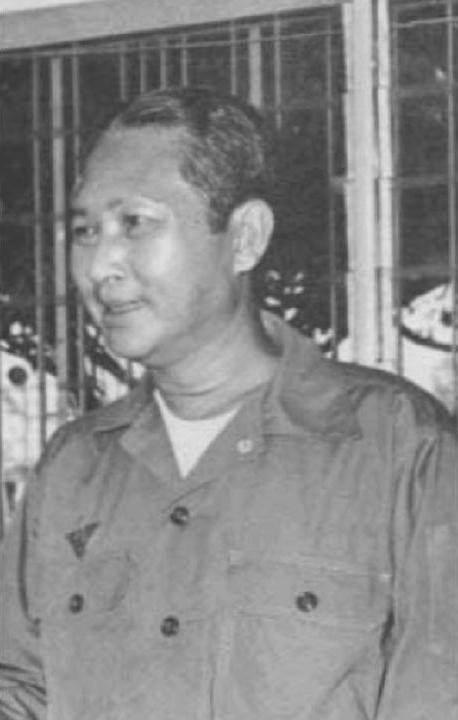
Lon Nol, President of the Khmer Republic

==== 1972 Parliamentary Election ====
Party	Votes	%	Seats	+/–
Social Republican Party	1,304,207	99.1	126	+126
Pracheachon	12,854	0.90	0	–
Invalid/blank votes	8,498	–	–	–
Total	1,325,559		126	0
Registered voters/turnout	1,686,900	78.6	–	–

==== 1972 Senate Election ====
Party	Votes	%	Seats	+/–
Social Republican Party	989,196	95.71	32	+32
Pracheachon	43,171	4.29	0	–
Invalid/blank votes		–	–	–
Total	1,032,367		32	0
Registered voters/turnout		-	–	–
