= Thongvan Fanmuong =

Cambodian military officer

- Military career
- Allegiance: First Kingdom of Cambodia; Khmer Republic
- Branch: Royal Cambodian Army; Khmer National Army
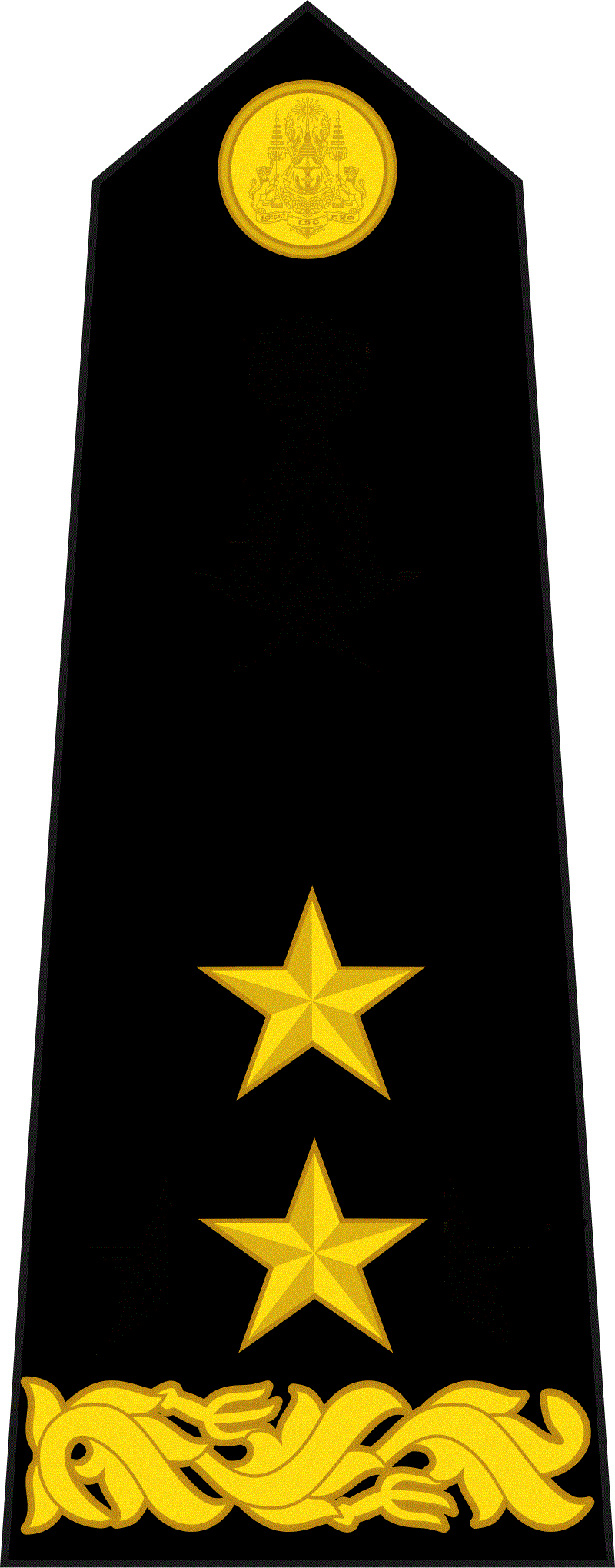
- Rank: Major general
- Commands: Military Region 1 commander FANK Chief of Operations
- Conflicts: Cambodian Civil War

Major general Thongvan Fanmuong was a Cambodian senior military officer who served in the Khmer National Armed Forces under the Khmer Republic regime of Lon Nol. He was a graduate of the French École d'État Major and the École de Guerre in Paris. He was a member of the supreme committee of the Republic of Cambodia, along with General Sak Sutsakhan, Long Boret, Hang Thun Hak, Op Kim Ang, General Ea Chhong (Chief-of-Staff of the Khmer Air Force), and Admiral Vong Sarendy (Chief-of-Staff the Khmer National Navy). The committee tried to "organize a surrender" as the Khmer Rouge took over the country.
