= Keuky Lim =

Cambodian former politician and physician

Professor Keuky Lim

Minister of Foreign Affairs
- In office December 26, 1973 – April 17, 1975
- Prime Minister: Long Boret
- Preceded by: Long Boret
- Succeeded by: Sarin Chhak

Minister of Information
- In office 1970–1971
- Prime Minister: Lon Nol
- Succeeded by: Long Boret

Personal details
- Born: March 7, 1937 (age 89) Siem Reap Province
- Party: Social Republican Party (1972–1975)
- Education: University of Texas at Austin; Paris Descartes University; Pierre and Marie Curie University
- Website: Cambodian Diebetes Association profile

Keuky Lim (born March 7, 1937) is a Cambodian former politician and physician who served as Minister for Foreign Affairs of the Khmer Republic from 1973 to 1975. Presently, he is the President of the Cambodian Diabetes Association which is dedicated to diagnosis, treatment, and self-management for Cambodians living with diabetes.
