= Les Kosem =

Cham-Cambodian military officer

- កូសេម ឡេស

Ambassador of Khmer Republic at large
- In office 1974–1975
- Prime Minister: Long Boret
- Preceded by: Lon Non

Personal details
- Born: 1927
- Died: 1976 (aged 48–49) Malaysia
- Party: Front for the Liberation of Champa
- Nickname: Po Nagar

Military service
- Allegiance: Cambodia; Khmer Republic
- Branch/service: Royal Khmer Armed Forces (until 1970); Khmer National Armed Forces (from 1970); SDECE
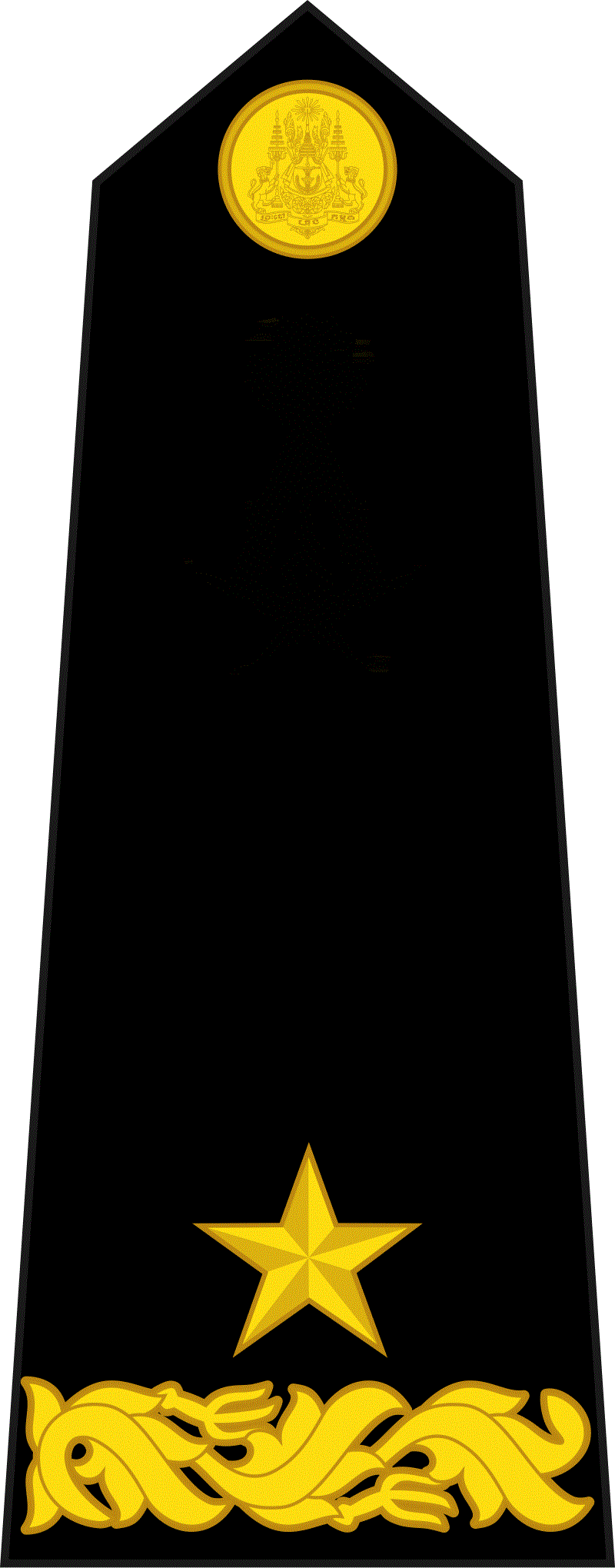
- Rank: Brigadier general
- Commands: 5th Special Brigade
- Battles/wars: Indochina Wars; Vietnam War; FULRO insurgency; Cambodian Civil War; Cambodian coup of 1970

Les Kosem (Khmer: កូសេម ឡេស pronounced [kɔoseːm leːh]), also known by the nom de guerre "Po Nagar", was a Cambodian-Cham military officer and a prominent figure in the Second Indochina War and the Cambodian Civil War.

== Early career ==
Kosem, an airborne colonel, was the most senior Cham officer in the Royal Cambodian Army (ARK). During the later 1950s, he had been responsible for setting up the FLC (Front de Libération du Champa) which is an organisation seeking greater autonomy for the Chams. In 1964, acting on the advice of a French 'handler', Kosem made overtures to the leadership of BAJARAKA, a group seeking independence for the Degar people of the Vietnamese Central Highlands. Kosem was thought to have been acting as a double agent, working for both the Cambodian secret service and the French SDECE. The link between the FLC, BAJARAKA, and the Khmer Krom "White Scarves" separatist movement was to result in the creation of the guerrilla movement FULRO.

In 1968, after internal disagreements within FULRO, Kosem was to surround the movement's headquarters with several battalions of the Royal Cambodian Army, and arrested its president Y Bham Enuol.

Kosem was also heavily involved in directing clandestine shipments of weapons from the port of Sihanoukville in Cambodia to the Viet Cong, in accordance with a secret arrangement between the Cambodian Head of State, Norodom Sihanouk, and the North Vietnamese.

== Cambodian Civil War ==
Following the Cambodian coup of 1970, Kosem became a prominent supporter of the Khmer Republic regime of Lon Nol, and rose to the rank of Brigadier general within the Khmer National Armed Forces (FANK); he was part of the influential circle of officers around Nol's brother, Lon Non. In the first years of the civil war fought by Lon Nol's forces against the Khmer Rouge communists, Kosem's troops of the 5th Special Brigade were repeatedly engaged in the most active areas of insurgency, and gained a reputation for allegedly systematically slaughtering the inhabitants of pro-Khmer Rouge villages; the counterproductive results of this reputation led to the unit eventually being disbanded, according to some sources. Kosem became well known for his ferocity and for corruption, although was also known for his generosity. After 1974 he was appointed as a roving ambassador for the Khmer Republic.

== Exile and death ==
Upon the Khmer Rouge victory in 17 April 1975, Kosem escaped from Phnom Penh and fled to exile in Malaysia. He died of natural causes a year later.
