= Lon Non =

Cambodian politician and soldier

- លន់ ណុន

Ambassador of Cambodia to the USA
- In office 1973 – September 1974

Minister of Interior
- In office 1970–1973
- President: Cheng Heng; Lon Nol
- Prime Minister: Lon Nol; Sisowath Sirik Matak; Son Ngoc Thanh; Hang Thun Hak; In Tam

Ambassador of Cambodia at large
- In office 1973–1974
- Prime Minister: Long Boret
- Succeeded by: Les Kosem

Personal details
- Born: April 18, 1930 Phnom Penh, Cambodia, French Indochina
- Died: April 17, 1975 (aged 44) Phnom Penh, Kampuchea
- Cause of death: Execution
- Party: Social Republican
- Relatives: Lon Nol (brother)
- Profession: Politician, soldier

Military service
- Allegiance: Kingdom of Cambodia; Khmer Republic
- Branch/service: Royal Khmer Army; Khmer National Armed Forces
- Years of service: 1950–1975
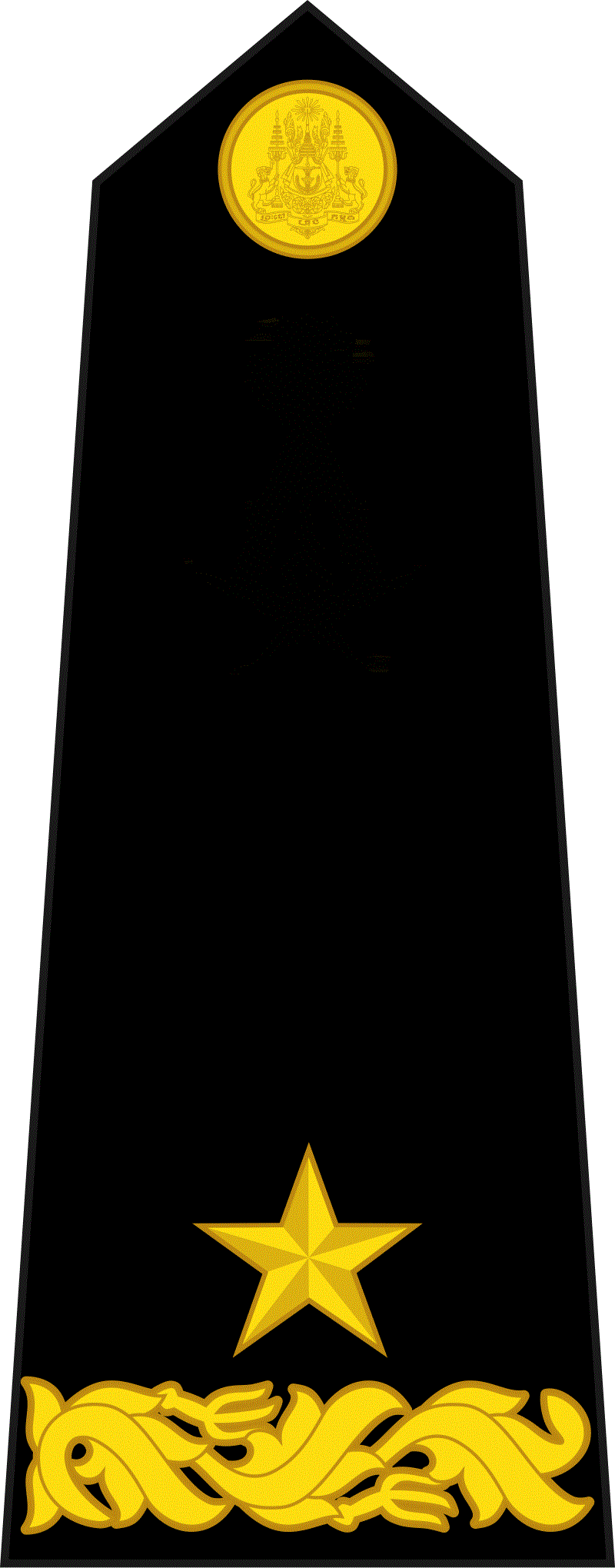
- Rank: Brigadier general
- Commands: 15th Infantry Brigade (FANK); 3rd Infantry Division (FANK)
- Battles/wars: First Indochina War; Vietnam War; Cambodian Civil War

Lon Non (Khmer: លន់ ណុន; 18 April 1930 – 17 April 1975) was a Cambodian military officer and politician who rose to prominence during the Cambodian Civil War (1967–1975) and the Khmer Republic (1970–1975).

Non was the younger brother of Prime Minister (and later President) Lon Nol. As a result, he was often referred to as "Little Brother" (French: Petit frère) in political circles, in which he was regarded as a somewhat Machiavellian figure who was determined to protect his brother's monopoly on power. Non was executed by Angkar and members of the Khmer Rouge after the Communist seizure of Phnom Penh in April 1975.

== Early life ==
Non was born in the early 20's, the son of Lon Hin, a Cambodian district administrator from Prey Veng. He attended Collège Norodom Sihanouk in Kampong Cham; his best friend there was a youth called Saloth Sar, who would later become better known as Pol Pot. He was first trained as an officer in the Royal Gendarmerie of Cambodia. Later, sponsored by his successful older brother, Lon Nol, he completed his education in France, where he studied criminology.

== Career ==
Under the administration of Prince Norodom Sihanouk, Non served as an officer of the military police, reaching the rank of Major. Subsequent to the Cambodian coup of 1970, in which Sihanouk was ousted by Lon Nol, then serving as Prime Minister, Non was rapidly promoted. Despite a lack of substantial military experience, he was soon given the rank of Colonel, and then Brigadier general: the 'elite', American-trained militias of the Khmer Kampuchea Krom and Khmer Serei, flown into the country after the coup, were placed under his command. The massacres of Vietnamese residents of Cambodia in the period subsequent to the coup are thought to have been carried out by the military under Lon Non's direction.

=== Political activity ===
Non's political motivation seems to have partly derived from an unswerving loyalty to his brother, and his machinations against the coup's other main figure, Prince Sisowath Sirik Matak, caused serious divisions in the Cambodian administration. While Lon Nol was in poor health during 1970 and 1971, his brother and the army made it clear they would accept no other leader and made efforts to sideline Sirik Matak, who was given the title of "Prime Minister-Delegate". In 1971 Non raised his political profile by directing a moderately successful military operation, Akineth Moha Padevuth, driving Khmer Rouge forces from villages around National Route 3 (Akineth was a wizard and hermit in the Reamker on whom Non seems to have modelled himself).

By early 1972 Lon Non finally managed to drive Sirik Matak from the government after organising groups of students to demonstrate against him. When, later in 1972, presidential elections were held, Non boasted that the monolithic vote of the Khmer National Armed Forces had secured his brother's inevitable victory. Non, who was ultimately to become Minister of the Interior, also created the Sangkum Sathéaranak Râth (the Socio-Republican Party, PSR) as a political organisation to represent the interests of Lon Nol and the officer corps. The two rival parties, In Tam's Democratic Party and Sirik Matak's Republicans, refused to contest the elections to the National Assembly in September 1972, leading to the PSR's total dominance.

Non's faction of the party was referred to as the Dangkor group, distinguishing it from the rival Dangrek faction centred on veteran radical Son Ngoc Thanh and academic Hang Thun Hak. In the ongoing Cambodian Civil War, Non appears to have planned to circumvent the influence of the People's Republic of China in the region by seeking help from the Soviet Union and France in achieving a peace settlement.

=== Allegations of corruption ===
Evidence was found linking Non with international heroin traffic, through a CIA-organised commando training camp that he headed. He also exploited his control of the army to accrue a large personal fortune by selling its weapons (many of which ended up in the hands of the Khmer Rouge). Non surrounded himself with a coterie of officers who were to have a substantial impact on the political and military conduct of the Republic, such as Lieutenant colonels Les Kosem and Chhim Chhuon and a former member of the Pracheachon socialist party, Major Penn Yuth.

The American government, the main supplier of aid to the Republic, began applying increasing pressure on Lon Nol to reduce his brother's influence, concerned about the latter's corruption, lack of moral scruples (combined with unusual ambition and energy) and his suspected implication in bombing and other attacks on his political rivals. Australian intelligence confirmed that Non had formed an assassination unit, called the "Republican Security Battalion", which used a fleet of yellow Hondas. The US suggested a variety of posts to occupy Lon Non's energies, or induce him to get out of the country. In 1973, after Non was eventually forced to leave Cambodia, his wife was caught with $170,000 in US$100 bills at Orly Airport in Paris as she was leaving to join her husband in the United States.

== Death ==
Despite a period in America as the Republic's "Ambassador-at-Large", Lon Non returned to Cambodia during 1974 and resumed his political activities. John Gunther Dean, the US ambassador, soon complained about Non's "frantic maneuvering", and appealed for US government assistance in controlling him. He appears to have been responsible for a bizarre last-ditch plot in which a group of students, led by a man named Hem Keth Dara and posing as a faction of the Khmer Rouge (under the title of Monatio, or the 'National Movement') attempted to seize key parts of the city ahead of the actual Communist forces. Along with Long Boret, he made efforts to broker a cease-fire agreement, despite both having been threatened with execution by the Khmer Rouge, as they were hunted down by Angkar. Non remained in the city until it fell to the Khmer Rouge on April 17, and was detained by the forces of Angkar at the Information Ministry. He was seen along with a group of officials under guard, looking apparently composed, "impeccably dressed" with a freshly starched uniform and trimmed moustache, and smoking a pipe. It is possible that he believed that the arrest was being carried out largely for 'effect', and that the Khmer Rouge wished to work with him in the future.

Soon after, Koy Thuon, a Khmer Rouge deputy front commander, organized the Committee for Wiping Out Enemies at the Hotel Monorom (11.57°N 104.918°E). Its first action was ordering the immediate execution of Lon Non and other leading government figures, who were probably executed on the grounds of the Cercle Sportif in Phnom Penh within hours. A later broadcast by the Khmer Rouge stated that Non had in fact been beaten to death by a crowd of "enraged" members of the populace, though the truth of this account is unclear.
