= La République sociale indépendante =

- Type: Bimonthly
- Founded: 1932
- Political alignment: Social Republican
- Language: French language
- Headquarters: 50, Chaussée-d'Antin, 9th arrondissement, Paris 48°52′26.2″N 2°19′58.4″E

La République sociale indépendante ('The Independent Social Republic') was a bimonthly publication issued from Paris, France, founded in 1932. It was the organ of the Social Republicans. André Neau was the director of the publication.
