= Pracheachon =

Cambodian political party

Krom Pracheachon ក្រុមប្រជាជន
- Leader: Non Suon; Keo Meas; Penn Yuth
- Founded: 1954 (first time); 1972 (second time)
- Dissolved: 1972
- Split from: Democratic Party
- Merged into: Communist Party of Kampuchea
- Headquarters: Phnom Penh, Cambodia
- Ideology: Communism; Marxism-Leninism; Socialism
- Political position: Left-wing
- Religion: Theravada Buddhism

Party flag

The Krom Pracheachon (Khmer: ក្រុមប្រជាជន [krom prɑciəcɔn]; "People's Group"), often referred to simply as Pracheachon, was a Cambodian political party that contested in parliamentary elections in 1955, 1958 and 1972.

For much of its existence, the party was a legal front organization for the clandestine Communist Party of Kampuchea.

== Formation ==
The Pracheachon came into existence as a result of the Geneva Accords of 1954. This guaranteed Cambodia's independence and neutrality, with parliamentary elections to be held the following year. Many of the Cambodians fighting for independence (notably members of the United Issarak Front) had been associated with the Viet Minh, who now agreed to withdraw their units from Cambodia: a large number of Khmer leftists, led by veteran Issarak Son Ngoc Minh, departed for Hanoi, where they were to remain for the next twenty years.

Those remaining leftists were encouraged to form a legal political party to contest elections: the Krom Pracheachon, which had a socialist platform. The Communist Party itself (led by Tou Samouth and Sieu Heng, and including later prominent figures such as Saloth Sar (Pol Pot) and Ieng Sary) continued as a purely clandestine organization.

The Pracheachon was led by Non Suon, Keo Meas, and Penn Yuth, all former Issaraks. It adopted the symbol of a plough.

== The 1955 election ==
The Cambodian elections of 1955 were the first in which the Krom Pracheachon took part. Due to severe harassment of its members by forces loyal to the Sangkum party of Prince Norodom Sihanouk, the Pracheachon was able to field only 35 candidates, winning 31,034 votes in total and gaining no seats.

According to the historian Ben Kiernan, Sihanouk later admitted that many districts had voted for socialist candidates, even when the official result showed them receiving few or no votes.

== 1958 election ==
In the period before the 1958 election, Sihanouk appeared deeply concerned with the possibility of Viet Minh / North Vietnamese domination of Cambodia. To coincide with the election, he published a series of articles tracing the history of Cambodian communism. Though the articles were perceptive in their analysis of communist tactics, they stressed the leftists' links with Vietnam and presented them as a threat to the Cambodian nation. Pressure on the Pracheachon was increased by posters showing buildings and trains destroyed by the Viet Minh, and slogans such as "The Pracheachon ruins the nation and sells the country to foreigners" and "The Pracheachon is not part of the Sangkum" appeared on walls and banners.

In the election, the Pracheachon managed to field only five candidates: 4 of these were to withdraw following police harassment, leaving only Keo Meas himself, who officially received 396 votes. Meas was forced to sit out the election from a haven on the Vietnamese border, fearing arrest.

Um Neng was one of the group's leaders at this time.

== 1962 election ==
The Krom Pracheachon was again subject to repressive measures (ostensibly for reasons of "security") in the run-up to the 1962 elections, in which its members hoped to participate.

Sihanouk's police arrested 14 of its remaining members, including Secretary-General Non Suon; they were charged with possessing documents incriminating them in seeking the overthrow of the Sangkum regime by North Vietnam. They were initially sentenced to death by a military court, with the sentences later being commuted to life imprisonment. The Pracheachon dissolved, and many of the remaining leftists fled Phnom Penh for the forests, except for several prominent figures (Khieu Samphan, Hou Yuon and Hu Nim) who had joined the Sangkum. Around this time, Communist leader Tou Samouth disappeared; Saloth Sar assumed the clandestine party's leadership.

== 1972 election ==
Following Lon Nol's expulsion of Sihanouk in the Cambodian coup of 1970 and the subsequent declaration of the Khmer Republic, the Pracheachon was resurrected, and fielded some candidates against Nol's Socio-Republican Party in the 1972 elections.

Initially, its leader was expected to be the leftist Hang Thun Hak; Hak instead joined the PSR, and Penn Yuth emerged as its leader. Yuth, now an officer in the Khmer National Armed Forces was, however by this time a close associate of Lon Nol, and it was widely thought that the Pracheachon had been reorganized by Nol's brother Lon Non specifically to provide a 'token' opposition to the PSR. Figures associated with the Pracheachon in this period included Saloth Chhay, a left-wing journalist who was the brother of Pol Pot (Saloth Sar). The Socio-Republican Party won all seats in the elections.
