= Um Neng =

Cambodian politician

Um Neng (Khmer: អ៊ុំ នាង), alias Vy (វី), was a Cambodian communist politician. In the early 1960s, he was a leading figure in the Pracheachon Group. At the 1971 congress of the Communist Party of Kampuchea, Um Neng was included in the Central Committee of the party. In 1974 Um Neng became the Deputy Zone Secretary of the CPK in the North-Eastern Zone.

Um Neng died in 1978. Some sources claim he committed suicide after being purged, whereas Kiernan (1985) claims he was executed.
