= Autrefois, Maison Privée =

Book by Bill Burke

- Author: Bill Burke, Bernard Fall
- Publication date: 2004
- ISBN: 978-1576871805

Autrefois, Maison Privée is a pictorial book by Bill Burke which includes an essay by Bernard B. Fall and a letter by Prince Sisowath Sirik Matak. The title means once a private house. The book refers to the prevalent reappropriation of once-private houses for municipal and government use.
