= Social Republican Party =

Ruling political party in Cambodia (1972–1975)

Social Republican Party គណបក្សសាធារណរដ្ឋសង្គម Parti républicain social
- Leader: Lon Nol
- Secretary-General: Hang Thun Hak; Pan Sothy
- Founded: 10 June 1972
- Dissolved: 17 April 1975
- Ideology: Neo-Khmerism; Chauvinism; Khmer nationalism; Ethnic nationalism; Anti-communism; Authoritarianism; Militarism; Conservatism; Cultural conservatism; Republicanism; Economic liberalism; Laissez-faire economics
- Political position: Far-right
- Religion: Theravada Buddhism

The Social Republican Party (Khmer: គណបក្សសាធារណរដ្ឋសង្គម; French: Parti républicain social, PRS) was a political party in Cambodia, founded by the then-Head of State of the Khmer Republic, Lon Nol, on 10 June 1972 to contest the general election held on 3 September 1972.

== History ==
=== Founding ===
The party was formed around Lon Nol's existing Socio-Republican Association, and was heavily influenced by his brother Lon Non and by the officers of the Khmer Republic's armed forces. It adopted the symbol of Angkor Wat, previously used by Prince Norodom Norindeth's Liberal Party from 1946–56.

=== Ideology ===
Its platform was populist, nationalist and anticommunist, Lon Nol being determined to oppose North Vietnamese and Chinese influence in the region in the context of the Second Indochina War: its three principal values were declared to be "republicanism, social responsibility and nationalism". The party's main function, however, was to support and legitimise Lon Nol's leadership of the country; he was later to develop a rather ramshackle chauvinist and semi-mystical ideology called "Neo-Khmerism" to back his political agenda. This Neo-Khmerism rejected capitalism based in Western individualist liberalism and communism. Besides that economic liberalism and laissez-faire economics were supported. Neo-Khmerism also was for the spreading of traditional culture Neo-Khmerism was supportive of civic education. Lon Nol wrote a book with the name "The New Khmer Way" also called "Blue Book" which talked about his ideology; it was printed in January 1973. However, it did not get much attention and only some observers like Elizabeth Becker took Lon Nol's ideas written in the book seriously. In 1974, Lon Nol wrote a second book with the name "Le néo-khmérisme".

=== Factions ===
The party had, early on, developed two distinct factions. One, known as Dangrek, was led by veteran rightist radical, and (since 18 March) prime minister, Son Ngoc Thanh and the left-wing academic Hang Thun Hak. The Dangrek faction, named after the mountain range in which Thanh's Khmer Serei guerrillas had been based, attracted those figures who had long been part of the republican and radical opposition to Prince Norodom Sihanouk in the period before the Republic's establishment. The other faction, known as Dangkor, centred on Lon Non and the army. Tension between these two factions would later prove a serious obstacle to stable government. A third faction which is known as Anti-Long Boret faction was led by Pan Sothy.

== 1972 elections ==
The two main opposition parties, the Democratic Party led by In Tam and the Republican Party of Sirik Matak, did not take part in the National Assembly Elections, saying that there were some dubious points in the election law. The Social Republican Party fielded 126 candidates and won all of the seats. The only opposition were 10 candidates fielded by the Pracheachon group, a resurrected socialist party widely believed to have been organised by Lon Non as a token opposition.

In the elections to the Senate, the upper house of legislature, the 'token' opposition to the PSR was provided by a few candidates of the Sangkum, the former party of Sihanouk, who had been deposed as Head of State by Lon Nol in 1970. The Sangkum had been formally dissolved in 1971, but as with the Pracheachon was resurrected by Lon Non to provide the appearance of a multiparty election.

== Political infighting ==
Thanh's brief period as prime minister ended on 15 October 1972, shortly after an assassination attempt widely believed to have been organised by Lon Non. The PSR's Secretary-General, Hang Thun Hak, was made prime minister in his place, but was to be forced out in early 1973 after a period of increasingly poor outcomes for the Republic in the Cambodian Civil War. After a period in which In Tam served in the post, PSR member Long Boret was made prime minister in late 1973.

Lon Non attempted to strengthen his influence on the PSR, but was forced into exile in September 1973. He returned in 1974 and as late as March 1975 was still attempting to obtain the party's Secretary-Generalship, despite the Republic by this time holding little more than the city of Phnom Penh.

In April 1975, the Socio-Republican Party, along with the rest of the Khmer Republic regime, fell to the Khmer Rouge.

== Election results ==
=== Presidential election ===
Election	Candidate	Total votes	Share of votes
1972	Lon Nol	578,560	54.9%

=== National Assembly ===
Election	Party leader	Votes			Seats		Position	Government
Election	Party leader	#	%	±	#	±	Position	Government
1972	Hang Thun Hak	1,304,207	99.1	▲99.1	126 / 126	▲126	▲1st	Social Republican

=== Senate ===
Election	Party leader	Votes			Seats		Position	Outcome
Election	Party leader	#	%	±	#	±	Position	Outcome
1972	Saukam Khoy	989,196	95.7	▲95.7	32 / 40	▲32	▲1st	Supermajority

== Notable members ==
- Lon Nol
- Peter Khoy Saukam
- Hang Thun Hak
- Long Boret
- Sơn Ngọc Thành
- Pan Sothy

== See also ==
- Khmer Republican Party
- Khmer Power Party
- Cambodian Liberty Party
