= Lon Nil =

Cambodian politician (died 1970)

Lon Nil (Khmer: លន់ និល; died 28 March 1970) was the brother of the former Cambodian prime minister Lon Nol, and was a casualty of the Cambodian coup of 1970.

Nil was the youngest son of Lon Hin, a district administrator in the French colonial era. Like his brother Lon Nol, he was educated at the Lycée Chasseloup-Laubat in Saigon, and like the rest of his family became employed in the state security apparatus. He eventually became police commissioner of Memot in Kampong Cham Province.

While Prince Norodom Sihanouk was on a trip abroad in Beijing, China, on March 18, 1970, Prince Sirik Matak assisted Lon Nol in organizing a vote of the National Assembly to depose Sihanouk as Head of State, giving himself emergency powers.

On March 23, Sihanouk made a public appeal in China for Cambodians to revolt against the government. There was rioting in Kampong Cham on March 26 in which the governor's palace was stormed and several officials killed by the crowd, notably two National Assembly deputies, Kim Phon and Sos Saoun. Lon Nol had sent his brother to Kampong Cham in order to monitor the situation there; Nil was chosen partly as he owned rubber plantations in the area and was therefore familiar with it. In Tonle Bet, Nil was set upon by a mob of pro-Sihanouk workers from the Chup plantation (a French-owned rubber plantation), and was beaten to death in the town marketplace.

There were persistent rumours that members of the crowd cut the liver from Lon Nil's body; it was then taken into a Chinese restaurant, where the owner was ordered to cook and slice it. It was then served to people in the immediate area. (Although the eating of an enemy's liver was considered a traditional act of revenge in Khmer culture, it was not commonplace, though it became a common propaganda device, as both sides in the subsequent Cambodian Civil War regularly accused each other's troops of committing it). A resident of Kampong Cham later stated that the crowd had done this specifically "to express their extreme anger" towards Lon Nol.

Lon Nol's troops were subsequently able to suppress the demonstrations, causing several hundred further deaths.
