= Bill Burke (photographer) =

American director and filmmaker (born 1943)

- Born: William M. Burke; 1943 (age 81–82); Derby, Connecticut, U.S.
- Education: Middlebury College, Rhode Island School of Design
- Website: www.binhfoto.com

William M. Burke (born 1943) is an American photographer and educator known for his 20 years of documentary photography in Vietnam and neighboring countries, detailing the effects of war.

== Biography ==
William M. Burke was born in 1943 in Derby, Connecticut. In 1966, he received a B.A. degree in Art History from Middlebury College. He continued studies at Rhode Island School of Design (RISD), and received a B.F.A degree in 1968 and a MFA degree in 1970, while studying with photographer Harry Callahan.

In 1971, he started teaching at the School of the Museum of Fine Arts in Boston. In 1978, he became a Guggenheim fellow in photography.

His work is included in many public collections including the Smithsonian American Art Museum (SAAM), San Francisco Museum of Modern Art (MoMA), Princeton University Art Museum, Museum of Modern Art (MoMA), Museum of Fine Arts, Boston, among others.

== Publications ==
- Burke, Bill (2017). TBW Annual Series Number 5, Four Book Set. Book 3: Bill Burke - They Shall Take Up Serpents. Oakland, California: TBW Books. ISBN 978-1-942953-28-9.
- Burke, Bill; Fall, Bernard; Matak, Prince Sirik (2004). Autrefois, Maison Privée. Brooklyn, New York: powerHouse Books. ISBN 978-1576871805.
- Burke, Bill; MCullin, Don; Peress, Gilles; Silverthrone, Marilyn (1985). Aperture 097. New York City, New York: Aperture Foundation. ISBN 9780893811556.
