= Sisowath Sirik Matak =

23rd Prime Minister of Cambodia

His Royal Highness Sisowath Sirik Matak
- ស៊ីសុវត្ថិ សិរិមតៈ
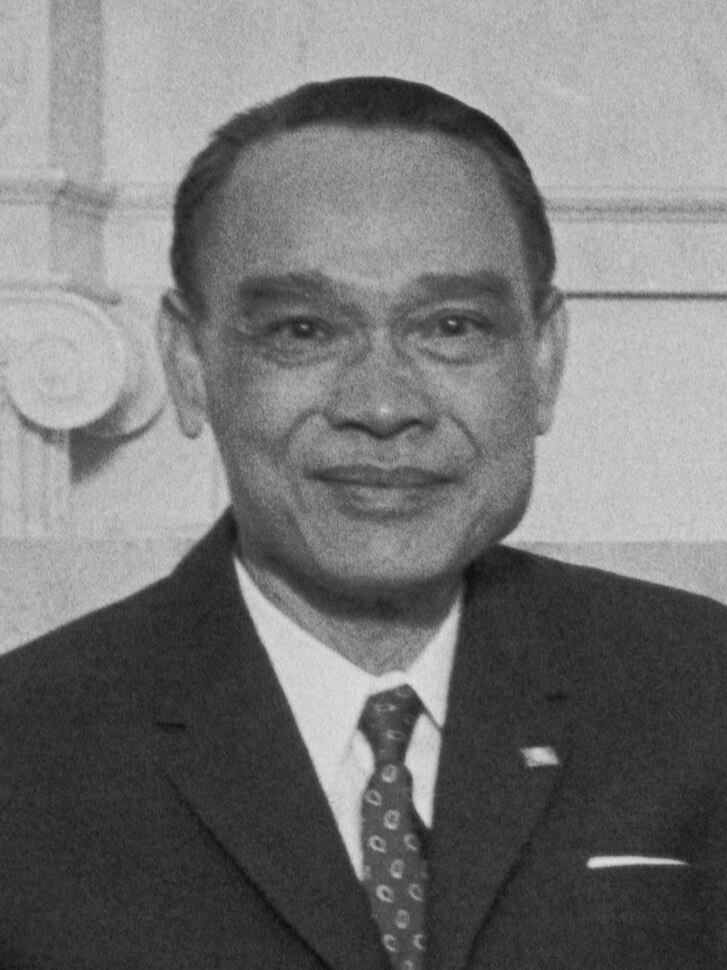
- Sirik Matak in 1971

Prime Minister of the Khmer Republic
- In office 11 March 1971 – 18 March 1972
- President: Lon Nol (from 1972); Cheng Heng (until 1972)
- Preceded by: Lon Nol
- Succeeded by: Son Ngoc Thanh

Deputy Prime Minister of the Khmer Republic (Note: Deputy Prime Minister of the Kingdom of Cambodia until the formal declaration of the republican government on 9 October 1970.)
- In office 14 August 1969 – 11 March 1971
- Monarch: Sisowath Kossamak (until 1970)
- President: Cheng Heng (from 1970); Norodom Sihanouk (until 1970)
- Prime Minister: Lon Nol

Cambodian Ambassador to China
- In office 1962–1964
- Monarch: Sisowath Kossamak
- Preceded by: Leng Ngeth
- Succeeded by: Truong Cang

Personal details
- Born: 22 January 1914 Phnom Penh, Cambodia, French Indochina
- Died: 21 April 1975 (aged 61) Phnom Penh, Kampuchea
- Party: Republican
- Spouse: Norodom Kethneari
- Children: Sisowath Chariya; Sisowath Lichavi; Sisowath Sirirath; Sisowath Santa; Sisowath Olary; Sisowath Kanika
- Parents: Sisowath Rathary (father); Troeung Yoen Yusen (mother)
- Relatives: Sisowath Methavy; Sisowath Essaro; Sisowath Vitourya; Sisowath Vithora; Sisowath Sorinkanret
- Profession: Politician, soldier
- House: Sisowath

Military service
- Allegiance: Kingdom of Cambodia; Khmer Republic
- Branch/service: Royal Khmer Army; Khmer National Army
- Years of service: 1949–1975
- Rank: Lieutenant general
- Commands: Chief of Staff of the Khmer National Armed Forces
- Battles/wars: Cambodian Civil War

Sisowath Sirik Matak (Khmer: ស៊ីសុវត្ថិ សិរិមតៈ; 22 January 1914 – 21 April 1975) was a Cambodian politician and member of the Cambodian royal family, under the House of Sisowath. He served as prime minister, refusing to flee before the Khmer Rouge entered Phnom Penh, and was executed by Angkar (The Organization) in 1975, four days after Lon Non and Long Boret who was also executed on the orders of "Angkar".

Sirik Matak was mainly notable for his involvement in Cambodian politics, particularly for his involvement in the 1970 change in power against his cousin, then Prince Norodom Sihanouk, and for his subsequent establishment, along with Lon Nol, of the Khmer Republic. In April 1975, Sirik Matak was executed by the orders of "Angkar", shortly after the Khmer Rouge seized power in the capital Phnom Penh, where he and other government officials were captured and executed by the new regime.

== Early life ==
Sirik Matak was born in Phnom Penh, and was a member of the Sisowath family, being the great-grandson of Sisowath of Cambodia by his grandfather Sisowath Essaravong and his father Sisowath Rathary. He was recruited into the colonial civil service in 1930.

Under the colonial French-imposed constitution, any member of the Norodom or Sisowath branches of the family could be selected as king, and Sirik Matak was therefore one of the possible contenders to the Cambodian throne. In 1941, after the death of King Sisowath Monivong, the French authorities selected Sirik Matak's cousin Norodom Sihanouk to be King, believing him to be relatively pliant. Sihanouk later accused Sirik Matak of harbouring a deep resentment against him, stating that he "hated me from childhood days because he thought his uncle, Prince Sisowath Monireth, should have been placed on the throne instead of myself. He even had a notion that he himself should have been chosen".

== Political career ==
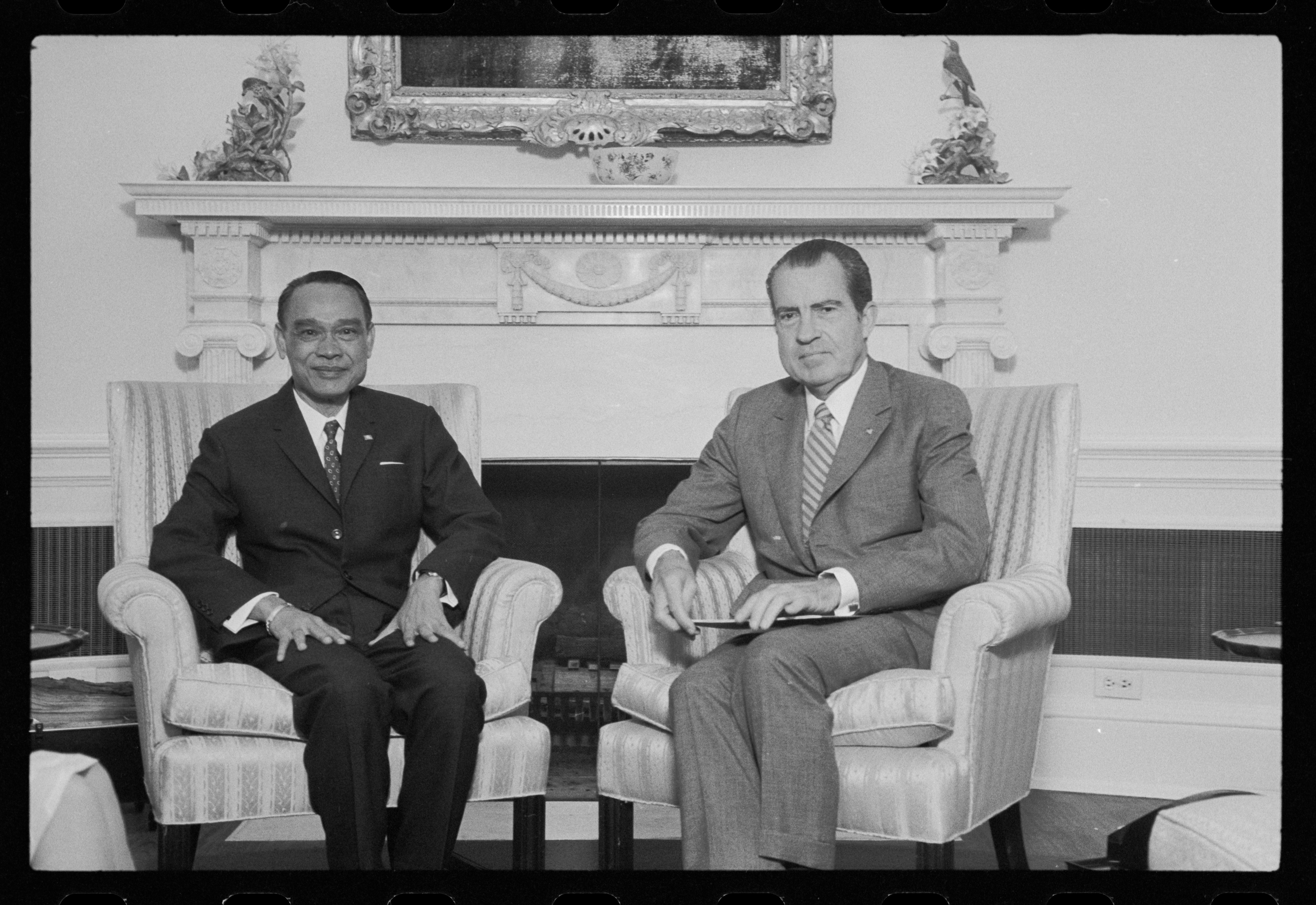
Matak with US President Richard Nixon in 1971

After the Second World War and capitulation of Japan, Sirik Matak became increasingly involved in Cambodian politics. As a part of the right-wing Khmer Renovation party headed by Lon Nol, he took part in the National Assembly elections in 1947, though the party failed to win any seats. Sihanouk, then acting as Prime Minister, placed him in charge of defence in 1952, formally appointing him Minister of Defence in the interim government set up after independence according to Geneva Accords in 1954; Sihanouk's Sangkum movement absorbed the Khmer Renovation Party prior to the Sangkum victory in the 1955 elections.

Despite the incorporation of much of the right-wing opposition into the Sangkum, Sirik Matak remained an implacable opponent of Sihanouk, and especially of the latter's toleration of North Vietnamese activity within Cambodia's borders. Throughout the 1960s, Sihanouk attempted to minimize Sirik Matak's leverage on domestic politics by successively appointing him as Ambassador to China (1962–1964), the Philippines, and Japan.

=== Cambodian coup of 1970 ===
Sirik Matak's power increased substantially after Lon Nol became prime minister in August 1969. After being appointed as Lon Nol's deputy, he proceeded to organise a series of economic denationalisation and deregulation measures in opposition to Sihanouk's previous policy of state control of import and export, banking, and production of pharmaceuticals and alcohol. Sirik Matak even visited Hanoi secretly to find out what could be done to remove North Vietnamese troops from Cambodian soil. He was infuriated when he was shown documents signed by Sihanouk agreeing to the establishment of North Vietnamese bases and the transport of Vietnamese supplies through Cambodian ports.

On 12 March 1970, while Sihanouk was on a trip abroad, Sirik Matak canceled Sihanouk's trade agreements and Lon Nol demanded that all North Vietnamese and NLF troops leave Cambodia by dawn on March 15. The deadline passed without any response from the Vietnamese. On 18 March, Sirik Matak assisted Lon Nol in organising a vote of the National Assembly to depose Sihanouk as head of state. The pretext was given by a series of anti-Vietnamese riots – likely encouraged by the Prime Minister and his deputy – in front of the North Vietnamese embassy.

Foreign media subsequently suggested that Sirik Matak, who continued as Lon Nol's deputy in the new government, was the real organisational force behind the coup; it was claimed that in order to finally convince Lon Nol, Sirik Matak had played him a tape-recorded press conference from Paris, in which Sihanouk threatened to execute them both on his return to Phnom Penh. It was even reported that Sirik Matak compelled Lon Nol at gunpoint to commit to deposing Sihanouk.

Sihanouk also assumed his cousin to be the main force behind the coup, claiming that Sirik Matak (backed by the CIA, and in contact with long-time Sihanouk opponent Son Ngoc Thanh) had already suggested the plan to Lon Nol as early as 1969. Sihanouk's suspicions seem to have rooted in fact: Prom Thos, one of Lon Nol's ministers, later told the historian Ben Kiernan that in around March 1969 Sirik Matak had argued that Sihanouk should be assassinated, Lon Nol rejecting the plan as "criminal insanity".

With the declaration of the Khmer Republic subsequent to the coup, Sirik Matak renounced his royal title, although he had initially planned in secret that his own son, or another member of the Sisowath family, possibly his son-in-law Prince Sisowath Duongchivin, should take the throne.

=== Khmer Republic ===
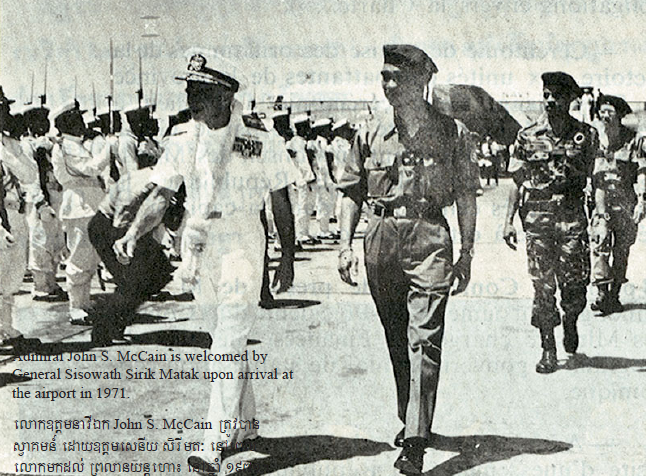
Sirik Matak walks with US Admiral John S. McCain upon his arrival at Phnom Penh International Airport in 1971.

Premier Lon Nol suffered a stroke on 8 February 1971 and resigned from his post on 20 April 1971. Several attempts to form a government failed, and so Lon Nol agreed to be the formal premier while giving his powers to his deputy Sirik Matak. On 6 May 1971 the cabinet was approved. On 10 March 1972 Lon Nol declared himself chief of state.

For the first year of the Republic, during which Lon Nol was often in poor health, Sirik Matak – as acting Premier – retained the most prominent role in the government. It had an overtly military character, Sirik Matak usually appearing in his full uniform as a Major-General and carrying a swagger stick. Whereas Lon Nol was particularly popular amongst anti-Sihanouk students in Cambodian cities, Sirik Matak had the support of the Westernised urban 'elite'; rural Cambodians remained overwhelmingly pro-Sihanouk.

Sirik Matak also had relatively little personal support within the Cambodian political establishment; his power was gradually undermined by the Prime Minister's brother, Lon Non, and he resigned in 1972 after the latter had organised a series of demonstrations against him. Despite pressure from the United States, who were strong supporters of Sirik Matak, Lon Nol kept him under effective house arrest, and he became an increasingly vocal critic of the Khmer Republic regime.

By April 1973, Lon Nol had been compelled to remove Lon Non and suspended the National Assembly, appointing a "High Political Council" composed of himself, Sirik Matak, Cheng Heng and In Tam. Privately, however, Sirik Matak stated that under the circumstances it would be preferable to allow Sihanouk to return, due to his levels of popular support, stating "if the people wanted him, I would accept". On being informed of this, an enraged Sihanouk called Sirik Matak "one of the worst reactionaries and traitors of the history of Cambodia [...] we are going to hang him, quite simply hang him, hang him".

=== The fall of Phnom Penh ===
The Khmer Rouge communists initiated their dry-season offensive to capture the beleaguered Cambodian capital on 1 January 1975. On 1 April 1975, President Lon Nol resigned and fled the country into exile in Hawaii; the Khmer Rouge had published a 'death list' with his name at the top, and their forces had now surrounded the capital.

On 12 April 1975, United States Ambassador to Cambodia John Gunther Dean offered high officials of the Khmer Republic political asylum in the United States, but Sirik Matak, Long Boret and Lon Non, along with other members of Lon Nol's cabinet, declined – despite the names of Boret and Sirik Matak being published by the Khmer Rouge in a list of "Seven Traitors" marked for execution. Sirik Matak's written response to the ambassador stated:

Dear Excellency and friend,

I thank you very sincerely for your letter and for your offer to transport me towards freedom. I cannot, alas, leave in such a cowardly fashion.

As for you and in particular for your great country, I never believed for a moment that you would have this sentiment of abandoning a people which has chosen liberty. You have refused us your protection and we can do nothing about it. You leave us and it is my wish that you and your country will find happiness under the sky.

But mark it well that, if I shall die here on the spot and in my country that I love, it is too bad because we are all born and must die one day. I have only committed the mistake of believing in you, the Americans.

Please accept, Excellency, my dear friend, my faithful and friendly sentiments. Prince Sirik Matak.

The letter was reproduced and added to the book Autrefois, Maison Privée.

Shortly after the surrender to the Khmer Rouge was announced, Sirik Matak sought refuge at the Hotel Le Phnom, where the International Red Cross was attempting to create a safe zone. He was turned away once the Red Cross learned that his name was on the list of "Seven Traitors". Outside the hotel, Sirik Matak talked to reporters and distributed copies of his letter to Ambassador Dean. François Bizot reported that Sirik Matak sought political asylum at the French Embassy and that the Khmer Rouge threatened to come into the compound and remove certain individuals by force if they did not go voluntarily. Accompanied by the French Vice-Consul Jean Dyrac and journalist Jon Swain, Bizot took responsibility for informing Sirik Matak of the Khmer Rouge's demands, at which point he voluntarily surrendered and left on a Khmer Rouge Jeep with Mam Nai. Sirik Matak and the officials that remained along with him were likely executed by the Khmer Rouge on 21 April 1975.

The exact details of his death are unclear, but Sihanouk received confirmation that Sirik Matak, along with Long Boret, had been summarily executed by firing squad at the Phnom Penh Cercle Sportif on 21 April; other reports state he was beheaded. Henry Kissinger and others, however, notes a report that Sirik Matak was shot in the stomach and left without medical aid to die over three days.

== Quotes ==
- "Man is born to die. I will not move. I shall stay here and face everything that happens. They can arrest me. If they kill me, what of it? I stay for my country."
- "To die today or tomorrow is no different – just knowing how to make use of your time for the sake of our future generations and society is enough."

== See also ==
- Hang Thun Hak

== Bibliography ==
- Pok, Rattana (2007). When Slaves Became Masters: A True-Life Story of a Little Boy Before, During, and After the Unfathomable Evil of Pol Pot’s Regime. AuthorHouse. ISBN 9781467823128.
- United States Department of State (1987). Background Notes, Cambodia. U.S. Department of State, Bureau of Public Affairs.
- Barron, John; Paul, Anthony (1977). Murder of a Gentle Land: The Untold Story of a Communist Genocide in Cambodia. Reader's Digest Press. ISBN 9780883491294.*Kenneth Conboy, FANK: A History of the Cambodian Armed Forces, 1970-1975, Equinox Publishing (Asia) Pte Ltd, Djakarta 2011. ISBN 978-979-3780-86-3
- Kenneth Conboy, Kenneth Bowra, and Mike Chappell, The War in Cambodia 1970-75, Men-at-arms series 209, Osprey Publishing Ltd, London 1989. ISBN 0-85045-851-X
- Jeldres, Julio A. (2003). The Royal House of Cambodia. Monument Books.
- Justin Corfield and Laura Summers, Historical Dictionary of Cambodia, Asian/Oceanian Historical Dictionaries No. 43, Scarecrow Press, Inc., Lanham, Maryland, and Oxford 2003. ISBN 0-8108-4524-5 –
- Sak Sutsakhan, The Khmer Republic at War and the Final Collapse, U.S. Army Center of Military History, Washington D.C. 1980. – available online at Vietnam.ttu.edu Part 1 PDF, Part 2 (PDF), Part 3 (PDF), Part 4 (PDF).
