= Long Boret =

26th Prime Minister of Cambodia

- ឡុង បូរ៉េត

Prime Minister of the Khmer Republic
- In office 26 December 1973 – 17 April 1975
- President: Lon Nol; Saukham Khoy; Sak Sutsakhan
- Deputy: Pan Sothy and Hang Thun Hak
- Preceded by: In Tam
- Succeeded by: Penn Nouth

Minister of Information
- In office 11 March 1971 – 18 March 1972
- Prime Minister: Lon Nol; Sisowath Sirik Matak

Minister of Foreign Affairs
- In office 15 October 1972 – 26 December 1973
- Prime Minister: Hang Thun Hak; In Tam
- Preceded by: Son Ngoc Thanh
- Succeeded by: Keuky Lim

Personal details
- Born: 3 January 1933 Kandal, Cambodia, French Indochina
- Died: 17 April 1975 (aged 42) Phnom Penh, Kampuchea
- Cause of death: Executed
- Party: Social Republican Party

Long Boret (Khmer: ឡុង បូរ៉េត, pronounced [loŋ boureːt]; 3 January 1933 – 17 April 1975) was a Cambodian politician who served as the last prime minister of the Khmer Republic from 26 December 1973, to 17 April 1975. Highly regarded for his honesty, he tried unsuccessfully to negotiate a peace settlement with the Khmer Rouge during the Cambodian Civil War. He was later arrested by the Khmer Rouge and executed on the orders of Angkar. He is one of two prime ministers to die in office, the other being Chan Sy. He was also the longest serving prime minister under the presidency of Lon Nol for the Khmer Republic.

== Early life ==
Long Boret was born in Chbar Ampéou near Phnom Penh in Kandal Province, Cambodia, the son of Ly Long Meas and Neang Ieng Buth. He attended the prestigious Lycée Sisowath in Phnom Penh from 1946 to 1952, studied in France from 1953 to 1955, then returned to Cambodia to work in the Royal Treasury.

Long had two wives. He divorced his first wife and he married his second wife one year later. He and his second wife were executed by the Khmer Rouge immediately after the Fall of Phnom Penh, as the two were targeted and marked on Angkar's death list, when it sees and hears everything on its command.

== Personal life ==
Long Boret was the author of a Khmer film called "Sea of Tears" (សមុទ្រទឹកភ្នែក).

Long's children are still alive today, some are in Cambodia and some in the United States. His second wife's eldest child is serving as a judge in Cambodia.

== Political career ==
In 1958 he was elected to parliament as MP for Stung Treng Province, and was the youngest MP in parliament. He served briefly in 1958 as Deputy Secretary of State for Labour and Social Action and was re-elected to Parliament in 1962. During this period he became known as the author of romance stories, many of which were serialized in newspapers. He was appointed State Secretary for Finance but he publicly opposed the decision in November 1963 by Norodom Sihanouk to nationalize banks and foreign trade, and was forced to resign. He retained his parliamentary seat in the 1966 elections. He was the Information Minister from 1971 to 1972 and the Foreign Minister from 1972 to 1973.

== Prime Minister of Cambodia ==
On 9 December 1973, he succeeded In Tam to become Prime Minister of Cambodia. On 2 April 1974, he became one of four members of an executive board composed, in addition to Long Boret, of Lon Nol, Sisowath Sirik Matak and General Sosthene Fernandez.

On 8 April 1975, he attempted unsuccessfully to negotiate a peace settlement in Bangkok with representatives of the Khmer Rouge.

== Arrest and execution ==
Long Boret remained in office until the Khmer Rouge captured Phnom Penh on 17 April 1975. US Ambassador John Gunther Dean recalls that, unlike many government officials who fled Phnom Penh, Long chose to remain behind despite being on a death list announced from Beijing by Norodom Sihanouk:

Long Boret refused to be evacuated. He was a competent, able man, much younger than Lon Nol or Sirik Matak. When I personally went to see him on April 12, the very morning of our evacuation, to ask him to take his wife and himself and his young children out of Phnom Penh because I feared for his safety, he thanked me but [said he] thought his life was not in danger.

General Sak Sutsakhan recalled that on the morning of 17 April Long decided to take his family and leave the city. Both General Sak and the journalist Jon Swain reported that Long and his family were unable to board the last helicopter flying out of the city. In his memoir, Danger Zones, Ambassador Dean stated that:

Long Boret had stayed in Cambodia, thinking that he could have some kind of dialogue with the Khmer Rouge. When he realized that that was impossible, he raced to the airport with his family in a jeep to try and get out of the country. When they arrived at the airport, they got on a helicopter with some military officers. One officer brutally shoved him off the helicopter. The copter took off. The Khmer Rouge captured Long Boret and his wife and killed them all. Boret’s son managed to escape and is now alive.

Long Boret was last seen by Jon Swain, Sydney Schanberg and Dith Pran outside the French Embassy. Swain reported:

...a black Citroën pulled up and Long Boret got out, his eyes puffy and red, his face empty of expression. When we asked him how he was, he muttered a short, incoherent sentence. His thoughts were elsewhere. Dazed, legs wobbling, he surrendered to the Khmer Rouge and joined the line of prisoners. I could not fail to admire his courage.

Schanberg gave a more detailed description of the scene:

Long Boret arrives in a car driven by his wife...he looks wretched. His eyes are puffed. He stares at the ground. He...knows what faces him. I want to get away but I feel I must say something to him, and Pran understands. I take Long Boret's hands and tell him what a brave thing he has done for his country and that I admire him for it. Pran takes his hands too...Long Boret tries to respond but cannot. Finally he mumbles 'Thank you.' And we must leave him.

Soon after, Koy Thuon, a Khmer Rouge deputy front commander, organized the "Committee for Wiping Out Enemies" at the Hotel Monorom (11.57°N 104.918°E). Its first action was ordering the immediate execution of Lon Non and other leading government figures. Long Boret was executed on the grounds of the Cercle Sportif in Phnom Penh. Khmer Rouge Radio subsequently reported that he had been beheaded but other reports indicate that he and Sisowath Sirik Matak were executed by firing squad.

Political offices
Preceded by In Tam	Prime Minister of Cambodia; 1973–1975	Succeeded by Penn Nouth
