= In Tam =

25th Prime Minister of Cambodia

- អ៊ិន តាំ

Prime Minister of the Khmer Republic
- In office 6 May 1973 – 9 December 1973
- President: Lon Nol
- Preceded by: Hang Thun Hak
- Succeeded by: Long Boret

President of the National Assembly
- In office 18 March 1970 – 11 March 1971
- Prime Minister: Lon Nol
- Preceded by: Ek Yi Oun
- Succeeded by: Yem Sambaur

Minister of Interior
- In office 1964–1966
- Prime Minister: Norodom Kantol

Personal details
- Born: 22 September 1916 Kampong Cham, Cambodia, French Indochina
- Died: 1 April 2006 (aged 89) Chandler, Arizona, U.S.
- Party: Democratic Party

Military service
- Allegiance: First Kingdom of Cambodia; Khmer Republic
- Branch/service: Royal Cambodian Army; Khmer National Army
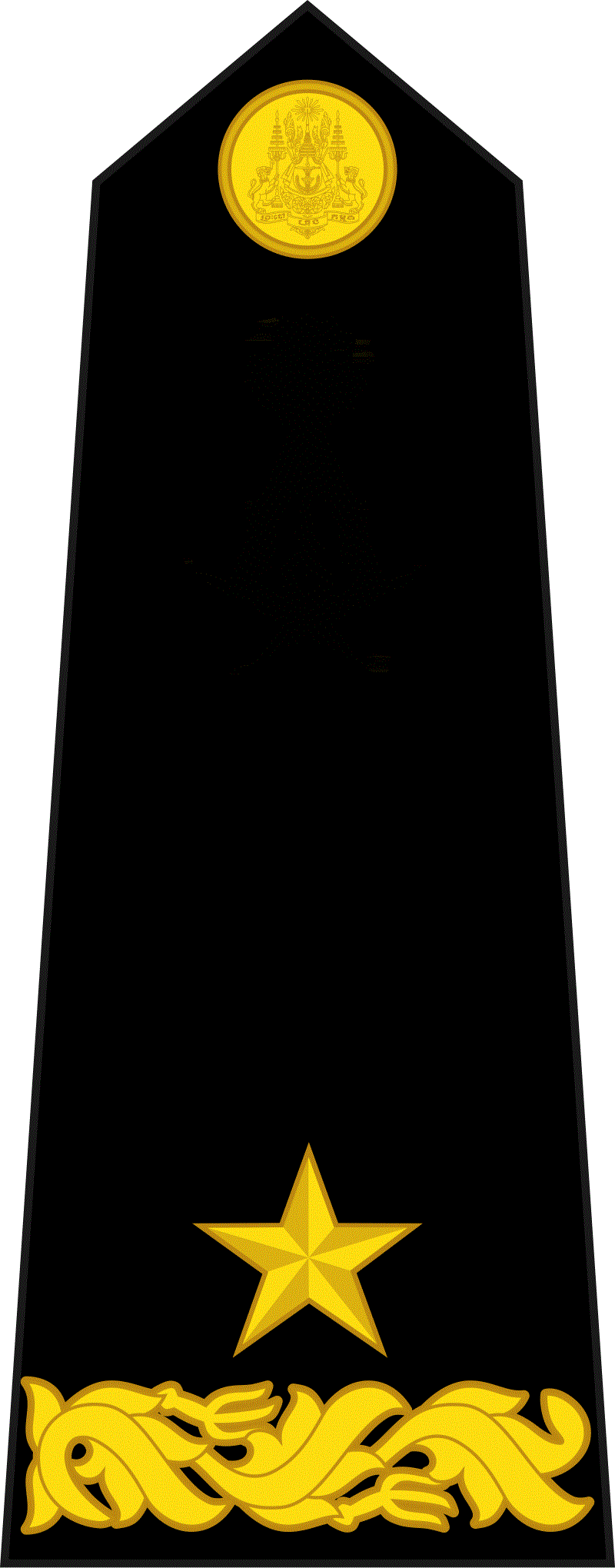
- Rank: Brigadier general
- Commands: Governor of Kampong Cham province and commander of the Kampong Cham military sub-district (1970–1971)
- Battles/wars: Cambodian Civil War

In Tam (Khmer: អ៊ិន តាំ [ʔɨn tam]; 22 September 1916 – 1 April 2006) was a Cambodian politician who once served as the prime minister of the Khmer Republic. He served in that position from 6 May 1973 to 9 December 1973, and had a long career in Cambodian politics.

== Political career ==
In Tam was born in Prek Kak village in Stung Treng district, Kampong Cham Province, in eastern Cambodia. As a child he studied Pali at Stung Treng Pagoda, before going on to study at the Lycee Sisowath. After serving as an inspector of the provincial militia, he eventually reached the rank of Brevet-General and rose to the position of governor of Takeo Province.

During the 1960s Tam served in several posts in the Sangkum government of Prince Norodom Sihanouk, most notably as interior minister from 1964 to 1966.

He was involved in the arrest of his own nephew Preap In, who was accused of membership of an anti-Sihanouk, rightist guerrilla organisation, the Khmer Serei; Preap In was later executed. Despite his former loyalty to Sihanouk, however, In Tam was one of the main figures behind the Cambodian coup of 1970, with the vote to remove Sihanouk from power taking place under his direction. As President of the National Assembly, In Tam personally proclaimed establishment of the Khmer Republic in October 1970.

After 1970, Tam came into increasing conflict with the coup's leader, Lon Nol. The latter took action in October 1971 to strip the National Assembly of its legislative powers, citing a growing state of emergency in the Cambodian Civil War: this provoked a protest by Tam and 400 monks.

In 1972, Tam ran in presidential elections against Lon Nol and Keo An. A United States National Security Council report judged Tam to be among the most experienced and politically mature of Cambodian politicians at the time, with a deserved reputation for incorruptibility and a modest lifestyle. He came in second place behind Lon Nol, receiving 24% of the vote: it was widely believed that if the elections had been fairly conducted In Tam would in fact have won outright, and despite manipulation of the vote still managed to win in the capital, Phnom Penh. Along with Prince Sisowath Sirik Matak's Republican Party, Tam's Democratic Party refused to contest the parliamentary elections later that year in protest at rules that they saw as favouring the Socio-Republican Party of Lon Nol and his brother Lon Non.

The following year, In Tam served as prime minister for seven months in Lon Nol's government, and was later put in charge of a programme designed to encourage communist cadres to defect to the government side, only to later ‘retire’ from politics and live with his family and supporters in Battambang. He was succeeded as prime minister by Long Boret.

When the Khmer Rouge gained control of Cambodia in April 1975, In Tam was at his farm in Poipet. He almost certainly would have been executed, but he fled to Thailand and attempted to organise a rebellion against the Khmer Rouge in the border areas. This did not last long, however, as the Thai authorities deported him. He went to France and then in 1976 moved to the United States where he received asylum.

== In exile ==
Following the overthrow of the Khmer Rouge regime by Vietnam, In Tam supported Norodom Sihanouk, and his FUNCINPEC organisation, against the Vietnamese-backed PRK government; he was the commander-in-chief of FUNCINPEC's military wing, the MOULINAKA, later known as the Armée nationale sihanoukiste, until his replacement by Prince Norodom Ranariddh in 1985. He was one of three ministers of National Defense of the Coalition Government of Democratic Kampuchea. He refounded the Cambodian Democratic Party, which failed to win seats in Parliament in the 1993 elections under auspice of United Nations. In 1997 he made an alliance with the Cambodian People's Party.

== Death ==
In Tam died in Chandler, Arizona in the southwestern United States. He was survived by three of his seven children and grandchildren.

== Notes ==
Political offices
Preceded by Hang Thun Hak	Prime Minister of Cambodia; May 6, 1973 – December 9, 1973	Succeeded by Long Boret
