= Khmer Republic =

Country in Southeast Asia from 1970 to 1975

Coordinates: 11°33′42″N 104°56′01″E

Khmer Republic សាធារណរដ្ឋខ្មែរ (Khmer) Sathearonaroat Khmae République khmère (French)
- 1970–1975
- Flag Coat of arms
- Motto: សេរីភាព សមភាព ភាតរភាព វឌ្ឍនភាព និងសុភមង្គល (Khmer) Sereipheap, Samapheap, Pheatarapheap, Voatthanapheap ning Sopheakmongkol; Liberté, Egalité, Fraternité, Progrès et Bonheur (French); "Liberty, Equality, Fraternity, Progress and Happiness"
- Anthem: ដំណើរនៃសាធារណរដ្ឋខ្មែរ (Khmer) Damnaeu ney Sathearonaroat Khmae; Marche de la République khmère (French); "March of the Khmer Republic"
- Location of the Khmer Republic

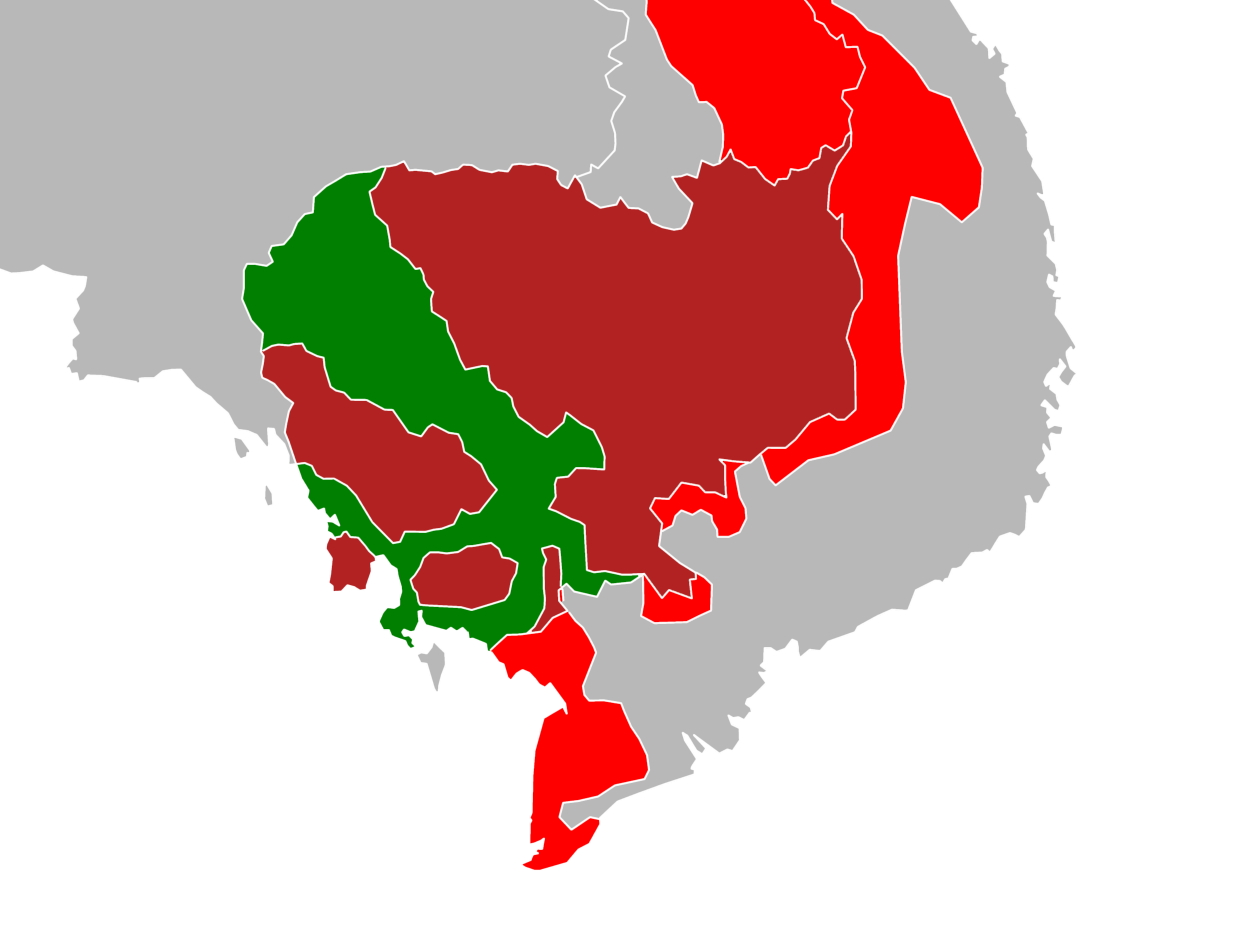
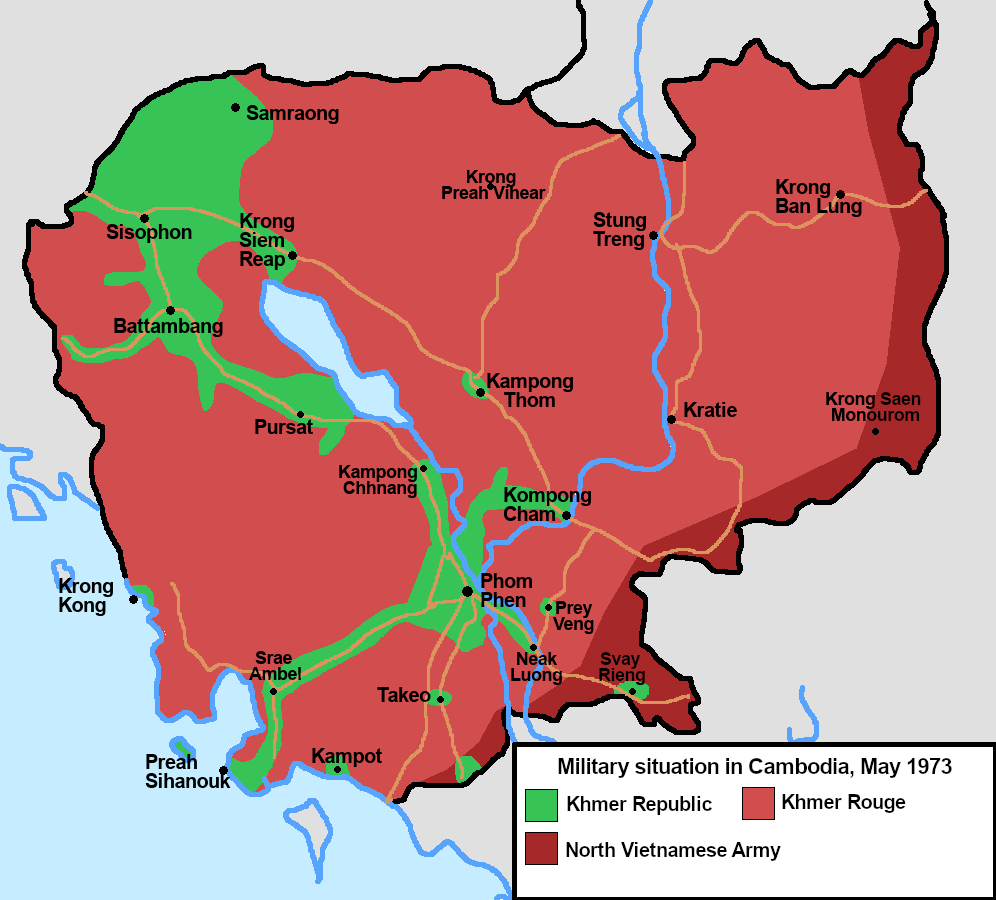
- Above: Situation of the Khmer Republic in 1970–1973 (green); Below: Situation of the Khmer Republic in May 1973 (green)
- Capital and largest city: Phnom Penh
- Official languages: Khmer; French
- Religion: Buddhism (official)
- Government: Unitary semi-presidential republic under a military dictatorship (Note: The government of Lon Nol denied in October 1971 that the country was a dictatorship.)
- President
  - 1970–1972: Cheng Heng
  - 1972–1975: Lon Nol
  - 1975: Saukam Khoy (acting)
  - 1975: Sak Sutsakhan (Note: as Chairman of the Supreme Committee)
- Prime Minister
  - 1970–1971: Lon Nol
  - 1971–1972: Sisowath Sirik Matak
  - 1972: Sơn Ngọc Thành
  - 1972–1973: Hang Thun Hak
  - 1973: In Tam
  - 1973–1975: Long Boret
- Legislature: Parliament
  - Upper house: Senate
  - Lower house: National Assembly
- History
  - Coup d'état: 18 March 1970
  - Republic proclaimed: 9 October 1970
  - Constitution: 12 May 1972
  - Fall of Phnom Penh: 17 April 1975
  - Last areas captured: 22 May 1975

Population
  - 1975: 7,952,000–8,102,000
- Currency: Riel (៛) (KHR)
- Time zone: UTC+07:00 (ICT)
- ISO 3166 code: KH
Preceded by	Succeeded by
State of Cambodia	Kampuchea; GRUNK
- Today part of: Cambodia

The Khmer Republic (Khmer: សាធារណរដ្ឋខ្មែរ, Sathearonaroat Khmae; French: République khmère) was a Cambodian state under the United States-backed military dictatorship of Marshal Lon Nol from 1970 to 1975. Its establishment was formally declared on 9 October 1970, following the 18 March 1970 coup d'état which led to the overthrow of Norodom Sihanouk's government and the subsequent abolition of the federalist Cambodian monarchy in favour of a centralised republic. After the coup, Sihanouk fled to Pyongyang and later Beijing in exile.

The main cause of the coup was Norodom Sihanouk's tolerance of North Vietnamese military activity within Cambodia's borders; communist North Vietnam and its Viet Cong had gained de facto control over vast areas of eastern Cambodia as a result. Another important factor was the dire state of the Cambodian economy, an indirect result of Sihanouk's policies of pursuing neutrality.

After Chief of State Sihanouk was overthrown on 18 March 1970, the Kingdom of Cambodia became a republic on 9 October, officially removing Queen Sisowath Kossamak. The character of the new regime was far-right and militaristic, and was also marked by massacres of Vietnamese Cambodians. Diplomatically, right before Sihanouk was overthrown, the Kingdom of Cambodia under Prime Minister Lon Nol ended its covert cooperation with North Vietnam. Following the removal of Sihanouk, the Khmer Republic aligned itself with South Vietnam in the ongoing Vietnam War. The Khmer Republic promulgated its own constitution in 1972. It was opposed within the Cambodian borders by the National United Front of Kampuchea (Front uni national de Kampuchéa, FUNK), a relatively broad alliance between Sihanouk, his supporters, and the Communist Party of Kampuchea.

The insurgency itself was conducted by the CPNLAF, the Cambodian People's National Liberation Armed Forces: they belonged to the communist Khmer Rouge and were backed by both the North Vietnamese Army (PAVN) and the Viet Cong, who occupied parts of Cambodia as part of their ongoing war against South Vietnam and allies.

Despite the large quantities of military and financial aid from the United States, the Khmer National Armed Forces (Forces armées nationales khmères, or FANK) were poorly trained and unable to defeat either the CPNLAF or the Vietnamese forces of the PAVN and the Viet Cong. The Republic eventually fell on 17 April 1975, when the Khmer Rouge—led by Pol Pot, Nuon Chea, Ieng Sary, Son Sen, and Khieu Samphan—took Phnom Penh and immediately set about forcibly evacuating the country's major cities. The Rouge also briefly restored the Kingdom of Cambodia before renaming itself "Democratic Kampuchea" on 5 January 1976.

== Political history ==
=== Coup ===
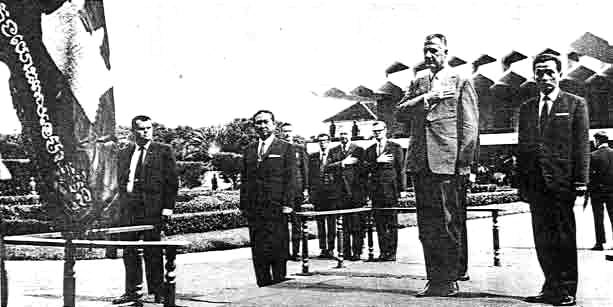
Prime Minister Lon Nol (2nd from left) and President Cheng Heng (far right) with US Vice President Spiro Agnew during his visit to Cambodia, September 1970.

Sihanouk himself claimed that the coup was the result of an alliance between his longstanding enemies, the exiled right-wing nationalist Son Ngoc Thanh, the politician Prince Sisowath Sirik Matak (depicted by Sihanouk as a disgruntled rival claimant to the Cambodian throne) and the CIA, who wished to install a more US-friendly regime. There is in fact little, if any, evidence of CIA involvement in the coup, although it seems that sections of the US military establishment – notably the Army Special Forces – may have had some involvement in terms of offering support and training to the plotters after being approached by Lon Nol.

While Sihanouk was out of the country on a trip to France, anti-Vietnamese rioting took place in Phnom Penh, during which the North Vietnamese and Viet Cong embassies were sacked. It seems likely that this rioting was at least tolerated, and possibly actively organised, by Lon Nol, the Prime Minister, and his deputy Prince Sirik Matak. On 12 March, the prime minister closed the port of Sihanoukville – through which weapons were being smuggled to the Viet Cong – to the North Vietnamese and issued an impossible ultimatum to them. All PAVN/Viet Cong forces were to withdraw from Cambodian soil within 72 hours (on 15 March) or face military action.

Despite these actions, which directly contradicted Sihanouk's policy of partial tolerance of North Vietnamese activity, it appears that Lon Nol himself had great personal reluctance to depose the Head of State: he initially may merely have wanted Sihanouk to apply more pressure to the North Vietnamese. He initially refused to commit to the plan; to convince him, Sirik Matak – who appears to have had a coup in mind from the start – played him a tape-recorded press conference from Paris, in which Sihanouk threatened to execute them both on his return to Phnom Penh. However, the Prime Minister remained uncertain, with the result that Sirik Matak, accompanied by three army officers, compelled a weeping Lon Nol to sign the necessary documents at gunpoint.

A vote was taken in the National Assembly on 18 March under the direction of In Tam, in which Sihanouk was stripped of his power: Lon Nol assumed the powers of the Head of State on an emergency basis. On 28 and 29 March there were large-scale popular demonstrations in favour of Sihanouk in several provincial cities, but Lon Nol's forces suppressed them with great brutality, causing several hundred deaths. Lon Nol's brother Lon Nil was among a number of government officials who were murdered by demonstrators.

Following the coup, North Vietnam and the Viet Cong advised Cambodia on 25 March 1970 that they were recalling all their diplomats from the country. In May 1970, North Vietnam withdrew its recognition of Cambodia, while Cambodia withdrew its recognition of the Viet Cong and re-established diplomatic relations with South Vietnam. Cambodia and South Vietnam would subsequently exchange ambassadors.

=== Declaration of the Khmer Republic and the formation of the FANK ===
The most significant immediate effect of the coup was the Cambodian campaign of April–July 1970, in which the South Vietnamese Army (ARVN), backed by US troops, entered eastern Cambodia to attack North Vietnamese and Viet Cong forces operating there. Despite this assault, many of the communist forces escaped westward, deeper into Cambodia, or to the rural areas of the north-east, where they would provide support for the insurgency against Lon Nol.

Lon Nol's immediate reaction was to condemn the action as a violation of Cambodian territory. He later informed Alexander Haig that his country had been placed in serious danger as a result. When Haig told him that American ground forces would not be used to assist the Cambodian army, and that (in accordance with the Nixon Doctrine) a programme of aid would be given instead, Lon Nol openly wept.

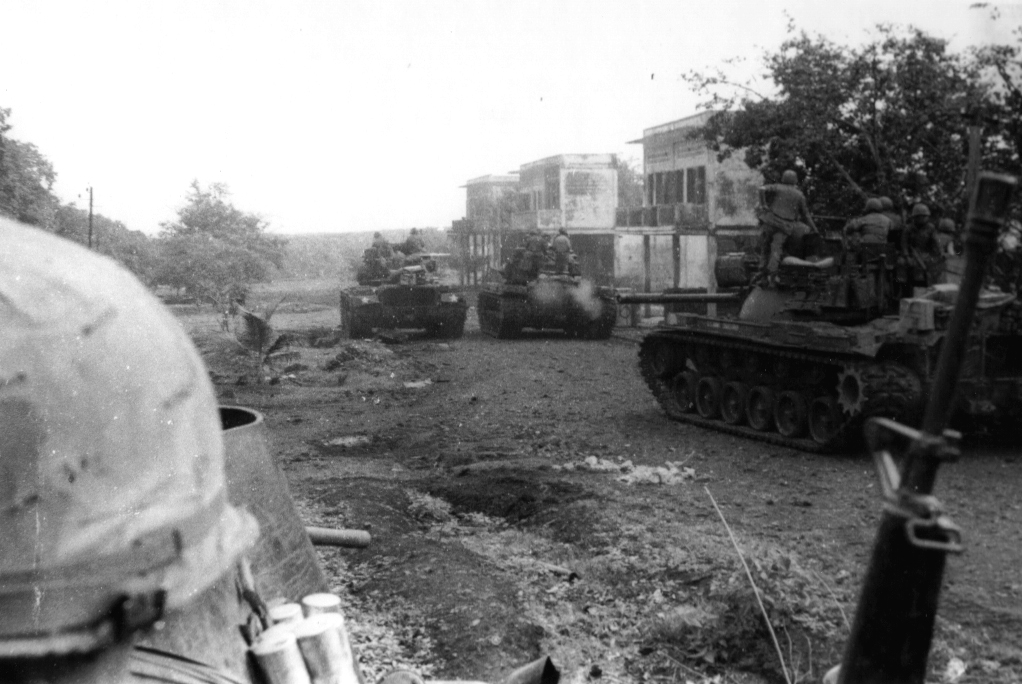
American troops of the 11th Armored Cavalry enter Snuol, Cambodia, 4 May 1970.

On 9 October Sihanouk was condemned to death in absentia by a military court; his mother, Queen Kossamak – the symbolic representative of the monarchy under Sihanouk's regime – was placed under house arrest, and his wife Monique was sentenced to life imprisonment. The new regime simultaneously declared the Khmer Republic, and a new constitution was eventually to be adopted in 1972. Sihanouk, in the meantime, had formed GRUNK, a Beijing-based government-in-exile incorporating the communists and dedicated to the Republic's overthrow; he declared Lon Nol to be a "complete idiot" and characterised Sirik Matak as "nasty, perfidious, a lousy bastard".

The relatively small Royal Khmer Armed Forces (FARK), which at the time of the coup had around 35,000 troops (in accordance with Sihanouk's stated policy of neutrality), was greatly expanded. Reorganising as the Khmer National Armed Forces (FANK), the republican military had grown to around 150,000 men as early as the end of 1970, mainly through voluntary enlistment as Lon Nol sought to capitalise on a wave of anti-Vietnamese sentiment. The regime's policies also carried out mass killings of Vietnamese Cambodians. The US also implemented its programme of structured military aid and assistance in training, and flew in several thousand Khmer Serei and Khmer Kampuchea Krom militia, trained in South Vietnamese bases. The Joint Chiefs insisted on massive expansion of the FANK to over 200,000 men, despite concerns at the severe negative effect this would have on Cambodia's economy, while the Military Equipment Delivery Team, led by General Theodore C. Mataxis, demanded the 'Americanisation' of the army's French-influenced internal structures, in spite of the chaos this caused in the supply chain.

Despite the US aid, the FANK (commanded by General Sosthène Fernandez) was seriously handicapped by corruption, particularly by officers claiming salaries for non-existent troops, and military incompetence. Although one of the FANK commanders – the former rebel Prince Norodom Chantaraingsey, who was coaxed out of military retirement by Lon Nol to raise the FANK's 13th Brigade – was to have considerable success in 'pacifying' the area around the strategic Highway 4 and the Kirirom Plateau, the majority of its generals had little military experience or ability. The large-scale FANK offensives against the Vietnamese, Operations Chenla I and II, ended in heavy defeat despite the conspicuous bravery of the individual Cambodian infantrymen.

As well as fighting the Cambodian Civil War against the pro-Sihanouk and communist insurgents and the North Vietnamese, the Khmer Republic faced considerable internal problems. Sihanouk's domination of political life during the 1950s and 60s meant that there were few confident or experienced Cambodian politicians. Almost from the start, the Republic was plagued by many of the same political divisions and infighting that had marked Sihanouk's regime; primary among these was a damaging power struggle between Lon Nol and Sirik Matak. Sirik Matak had been acting Prime Minister during the Republic's first year, when Lon Nol's health had been extremely poor, but had engendered considerable resentment due to his administrative style and royal connections; there was also growing frustration amongst young, urban Cambodians at the continued corruption and inefficiency of the regime.

On Lon Nol's return from hospital in Hawaii in April 1971, he instigated a cabinet crisis by resigning, providing a means to dissolve the government, with the probable encouragement of his brother Lon Non (a figure of considerable influence, especially with the military). After much political squabbling, a new cabinet was formed, though Sirik Matak continued as acting premier with the title of "Prime Minister-Delegate". On 16 October 1971, Lon Nol took action to strip the National Assembly of legislative power, and ordered it to write a new constitution, claiming that these actions were necessary to prevent anarchy; this provoked a protest by In Tam and 400 Buddhist monks.

=== 1972: Removal of Sirik Matak ===
By 18 March 1972, Lon Nol and his brother had managed to drive Sirik Matak from power. After Sirik Matak had sacked Keo An, a dissident academic, Lon Non organised a series of vocal student demonstrations against him calling for his removal. Sirik Matak resigned, and (ostensibly for his 'protection') was placed under effective house arrest. Lon Nol used the crisis to oust the Head of State, Cheng Heng, and took over the role himself, appointing the veteran anti-Sihanouk nationalist Son Ngoc Thanh as Prime Minister. Thanh, leader of the Khmer Serei, had recruited FANK reinforcements amongst the Khmer Krom of southern Vietnam, and the loyalty he commanded amongst these comparatively elite, US-trained troops meant that his support for the Republic's fragile government remained essential.

Later that year, Lon Nol announced he would hold presidential elections, and was surprised when In Tam and Keo An – the latter a reputed Sihanoukist – not only announced that they would run, but then refused to withdraw. The elections, despite an inevitable victory for Lon Nol, revealed considerable dissatisfaction with the government even though they had been rigged in Lon Nol's favour: had they been fair, it is likely that In Tam would have won. The affair prompted In Tam to suggest that the Americans could now "stew in Lon Nol's juice".

The political situation continued to unravel throughout 1972: both opposition parties (In Tam's Democratic Party and Sirik Matak's Republican Party) refused to contest the elections to the National Assembly held in September, leading to a sweeping victory for Lon Non's Socio-Republican Party (Sangkum Sathéaranak Râth). There were a growing number of terrorist attacks in the capital, one of which was directed at Son Ngoc Thanh. Thanh – whose last political act was to ban Sirik Matak's newspaper – was then forced to resign, going back into South Vietnamese exile, and was replaced by the moderate leftist Hang Thun Hak.

While the Khmer Republic's government was being weakened by infighting, North Vietnamese forces – who had previously carried out much of the fighting against the FANK, as in Operation Chenla I and II – gradually and deliberately scaled back their presence within Cambodian borders, leaving mainly logistical and support staff. Their place was taken by native Cambodian communist forces of the CPNLAF, which had been greatly increased when Sihanouk gave his support to the insurgency, rural Cambodians remaining overwhelmingly pro-Sihanouk.

=== 1973: Ceasefire and the suspension of the National Assembly ===
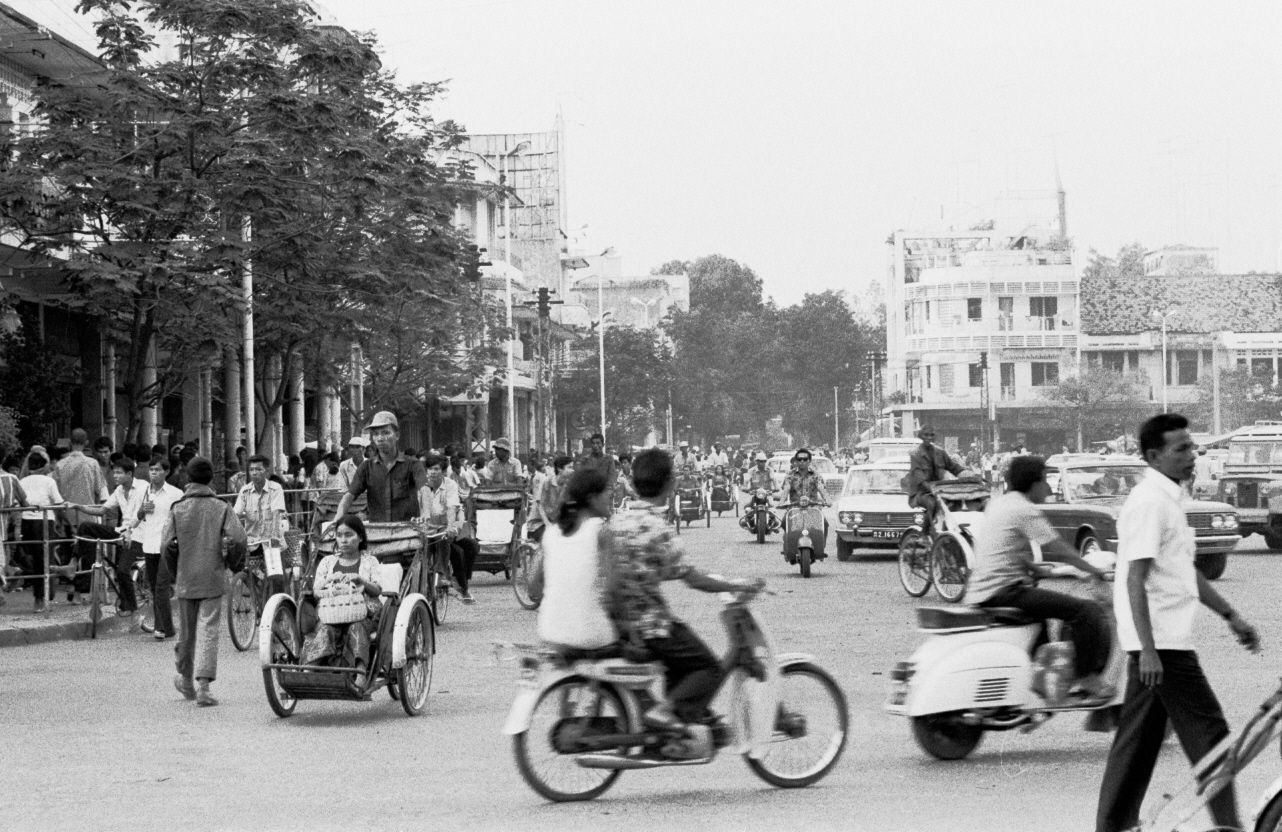
Phnom Penh in 1973.

The Paris Peace Accords of January 1973 seemed to offer a temporary respite from the civil war; Lon Nol declared a unilateral ceasefire, despite the FANK's very weak position on the ground. There were in fact a few contacts between some of the more moderate elements of the Khmer Rouge communists – notably Hou Yuon – and the Republic. The North Vietnamese pressured the Cambodian communists to accept the terms of the peace accords; their interests lay more in keeping the war active at a low level (tying down South Vietnamese troops in the process) than in an outright victory for the Khmer Rouge. The Khmer Rouge leadership, however, remained intransigent.

The fighting resumed on the night of 7 February 1973, when communist forces attacked the FANK perimeter around the besieged city of Kampong Thom. By April, the Republic regime was in general disarray, with FANK troops refusing to fight and looting their own capital, and the CPNLAF advancing in many areas of the country. In response, the US finally threatened to cut off all aid unless Lon Nol acted to broaden the power base and support of the government – specifically, to reinstate the US ally Sirik Matak – and reduce the influence of his brother Lon Non.

Accordingly, on 24 April, Lon Nol announced that the National Assembly would be suspended, and that a Political Council formed of himself, Sirik Matak, Cheng Heng, and In Tam, would effectively rule by decree. The CPNLAF advance on Phnom Penh was eventually halted by American bombing, which caused horrific casualty levels amongst the communist troops. Some commentators state that the experience is likely to have contributed to the brutality shown by the Khmer Rouge cadres in later events.

=== 1974: Fall of Oudong ===
By early 1974, the Political Council had been sidelined, and Lon Nol was once again ruling alone. The military situation, in the meantime, was deteriorating further. Communist forces came within shelling distance of Phnom Penh, and captured the former royal capital of Oudong in March: they 'evacuated' its population – shooting government officials and teachers – and destroyed or burnt much of the town. There was a brief improvement as the year progressed, however, as the FANK retook Oudong, and was able to secure supply routes through Lake Tonlé Sap.

=== End of the regime ===
Despite this, the Khmer Republic did not survive the 1975 dry season offensive. The Khmer Rouge had by this point surrounded the capital, whose population had been vastly increased by refugees from the fighting; Lon Nol, who was extremely superstitious, ordered that consecrated sand be spread around the city from helicopters to protect it. Though the FANK was by this time fighting with extreme tenacity, and the Khmer Rouge soldiers were suffering from poor morale, malaria, and even higher rates of casualties than the FANK, fresh supplies of arms and ammunition from China gave them the impetus to overrun the Republic's remaining outposts.

Proposed peace negotiations repeatedly stalled as Sihanouk refused to deal with Lon Nol directly, requesting his removal as a precondition. A plan proposed by Étienne Manac'h, the French Ambassador to China, in which Sihanouk would return to Cambodia as the head of a national unity government (leading to the likely immediate defection of a large proportion of the Khmer Rouge's peasant soldiers), failed to materialise.

On 1 April 1975, Lon Nol resigned and fled the country into exile: the FANK almost immediately disintegrated. While Sirik Matak, Long Boret, Lon Non and several other politicians remained in the capital in an attempt to negotiate a ceasefire, Phnom Penh fell to the Khmer Rouge on 17 April. Within a few days they had executed many representatives of the old regime, and the Khmer Republic had effectively come to an end. During its brief existence it had received almost exactly one million dollars of US military and economic aid a day. The Rouge—led by Pol Pot, Nuon Chea, Ieng Sary, Son Sen, and Khieu Samphan—immediately set about forcibly evacuating the country's major cities and briefly restored the Kingdom of Cambodia before renaming itself "Democratic Kampuchea" on 5 January 1976.

Some remaining areas controlled by the Republic in Kompon Chhnang got circa captured on 17 April 1975. The Khmer National Armed Forces troops in Kompong Thom and Siemreap remained loyal to the Republic. On 01:30 p.m 17 April 1975, some parts of Oddar Meanchey were still under the control of the Republic, as Sak Sutsakhan wrote in his book.

The final area held by the Republic in any form was the temple of Preah Vihear in the Dângrêk Mountains, which FANK forces still occupied in late April 1975. It was finally taken by the Khmer Rouge on 22 May that year.

== See also ==
- Khmer National Armed Forces (FANK)
- Cambodian Civil War
  - Fall of Phnom Penh
- Cambodia at the 1972 Summer Olympics
