= Hang Thun Hak =

24th Prime Minister of Cambodia

- ហង្ស ធុនហាក់

Prime Minister of the Khmer Republic
- In office 15 October 1972 – 6 May 1973
- President: Lon Nol
- Preceded by: Son Ngoc Thanh
- Succeeded by: In Tam

Rector of the Royal University of Fine Arts
- In office 1966–1970

Personal details
- Born: 2 August 1926 Stueng Trang, Kampong Cham, Cambodia, French Indochina
- Died: 18 April 1975 (aged 48) Phnom Penh, Kampuchea
- Cause of death: Executed
- Party: Social Republican Party
- Profession: Academic; Author; Politician

Hang Thun Hak (Khmer: ហង្ស ធុនហាក់; 2 August 1926 – 18 April 1975) was a Cambodian radical politician, academic and playwright.

== Life ==
Hak studied theatre in Paris, where he became associated with the group of radical students centered on Keng Vannsak, which included several future leaders of the Cambodian Communists. He returned to Cambodia in 1951, and spent some time with Son Ngoc Thanh's anti-colonial resistance fighters, operating from the forests in the area of Siem Reap: Hak returned to public life in 1953, shortly prior to Cambodian independence.

Under the Sangkum regime of Prince Norodom Sihanouk, Hang Thun Hak taught at the National Theatre School, where his work was central to the development of modern Cambodian theatre. He served as Director of the Royal University of Fine Arts after its founding in 1965. Many of his plays, such as Thma Raom and Kanya Chareya (both dating from the late 1950s) attacked government corruption, and contained a strong element of political satire; Hak's close links with the Queen Mother, Sisowath Kosamak, helped to protect performances of these works.

The Cambodian coup of 1970, carried out by General Lon Nol, led to the end of Sihanouk's power and the establishment of the Khmer Republic. Hak was initially mooted as a leader of the Pracheachon party, a socialist party with which he had previously been involved, but eventually joined the Social Republican Party led by Lon Nol, and served as Prime Minister between 15 October 1972 and 6 May 1973.

By this time, however, the Republic had become embroiled in a bitter war against the GRUNK, a coalition between Sihanouk and his former Communist opponents, the Khmer Rouge. Despite the American policy, in force at the time, of ignoring Sihanouk in negotiations, Hak made attempts to contact him in the possibility of reaching a settlement; he also had some contact with the Khmer Rouge themselves through one of their leaders, Hou Yuon. He also ensured that Queen Kossamak, Sihanouk's mother, remained protected, accompanying her to Beijing in 1973. Hak was forced to resign later in 1973.

After Lon Nol fled the capital on 1 April 1975, Hak was elected as a member of the Governing Council which sought to reach a ceasefire agreement with the Communists.

== Execution ==
Hak who was urged to leave Cambodia after the Khmer Rouge led by Angkar ("Organization") entered Phnom Penh, refused to do so due to his love for his native country. However, he was able to get his wife, son and 2 daughters out of the country and into the US. However, he remained and was eventually executed on 18 April.

== Bibliography ==
- Corfield, Justin J. (1991). A History of the Cambodian Non-Communist Resistance, 1975–1983. Centre of Southeast Asian Studies, Monash University. ISBN 9780732602901.
- United States Senate (1973). Relief and Rehabilitation of War Victims in Indochina: Hearing, Ninety-third Congress, First Session. U.S. Government Printing Office.
