= 1970 Cambodian coup d'état =

Coup that overthrew Prince Norodom Sihanouk

- Part of the Cambodian Civil War
Date	18 March 1970
Location	Cambodia
Result	Coup d’état succeeds: Disestablishment of the Kingdom of Cambodia and establishment of the transitional government and then the Khmer Republic; Abandonment of neutrality policy and alignment with United States; Expansion of the FANK and escalation of the Cambodian Civil War; Persecution of Vietnamese Cambodians

Belligerents
(Cambodia) House of Norodom; (Cambodia) Royal Cambodian Armed Forces loyalists (Cambodia); Popular Socialist Community (pro Sihanouk); Pro-Sihanouk partisans	Government of Cambodia; (Cambodia) Royal Cambodian Armed Forces coup plotters; (Cambodia) Parliament; (Cambodia) National Assembly; (Cambodia) Khmer Serei; (Cambodia) Popular Socialist Community (pro Lon Nol); FULRO (FLC faction); Supported by: United States (Alleged)

Commanders and leaders
(Cambodia) Norodom Sihanouk (Cambodia) Sisowath Kossamak (Cambodia) Penn Nouth (Cambodia) Son Sann	(Cambodia) Lon Nol; (Cambodia) Lon Non; (Cambodia) Cheng Heng; (Cambodia) In Tam; (Cambodia) Long Boret; (Cambodia) Sisowath Sirik Matak; (Cambodia) Sơn Ngọc Thành; (Cambodia) Lon Nil †; (Cambodia) Chhan Sokhom; Les Kosem

A coup d'état removed the Cambodian chief of state, Prince Norodom Sihanouk, after a vote in the National Assembly on 18 March 1970. Emergency powers were subsequently invoked by the Prime Minister Lon Nol, who became effective head of state, and led ultimately to the removal of Queen Sisowath Kossamak and the proclamation of the Khmer Republic later that year. It is generally seen as a turning point in the Cambodian Civil War. No longer a monarchy, Cambodia was semi-officially called "État du Cambodge" (State of Cambodia) in the intervening six months after the coup, until the republic was proclaimed. (Note: The name "State of Cambodia" would be later revived under the People's Republic of Kampuchea regime between 1989 and 1993.)

It also marked the change of Cambodia involvement in the Vietnam War, as Lon Nol issued an ultimatum to North Vietnamese forces to leave Cambodia.

== Background ==
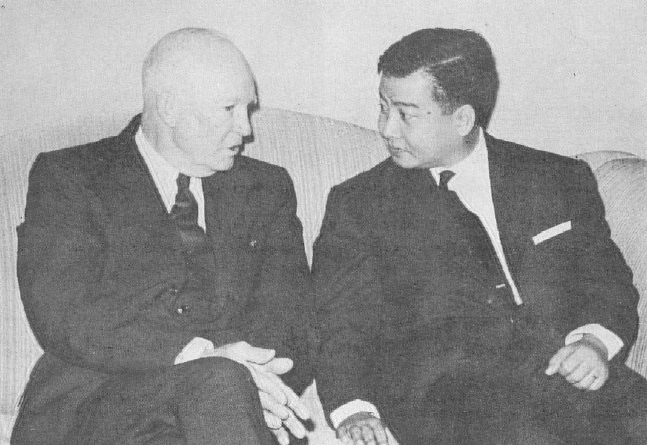
Washington 1959: Prince Sihanouk and President Eisenhower

Since independence from France in 1953, Cambodia had been led by Prince Norodom Sihanouk, whose Sangkum political movement secured complete political power after the 1955 parliamentary election, where no opposition candidate secured a single seat. Following King Norodom Suramarit's death in 1960, Sihanouk had forced the National Assembly to approve a constitutional amendment that made him Chief of State with no fixed term of office, while Queen Sisowath Kossamak remained a mere ceremonial figure. He had retained domestic power through a combination of political manipulation, intimidation, patronage, nepotism and careful balancing of left- and right-wing elements within his government; whilst placating the right with Khmer-nationalist rhetoric, he appropriated much of the language of socialism to marginalize the Cambodian communist movement, whom he called the Khmers rouges ("Red Khmers").

With the Second Indochina War escalating, Sihanouk's balancing act between left and right became harder to maintain. Cross-border smuggling of rice also began to have a serious effect on the Cambodian economy. In the Cambodian elections of 1966, the usual Sangkum policy of having one candidate in each electoral district was abandoned; there was a huge swing to the right, especially as left-wing deputies had to compete directly with members of the traditional elite, who were able to use their local influence. Although a few communists within the Sangkum – such as Hou Yuon and Khieu Samphan – chose to stand, most leftists were decisively defeated. Lon Nol, a rightist who had been a longstanding associate of Sihanouk, became prime minister.

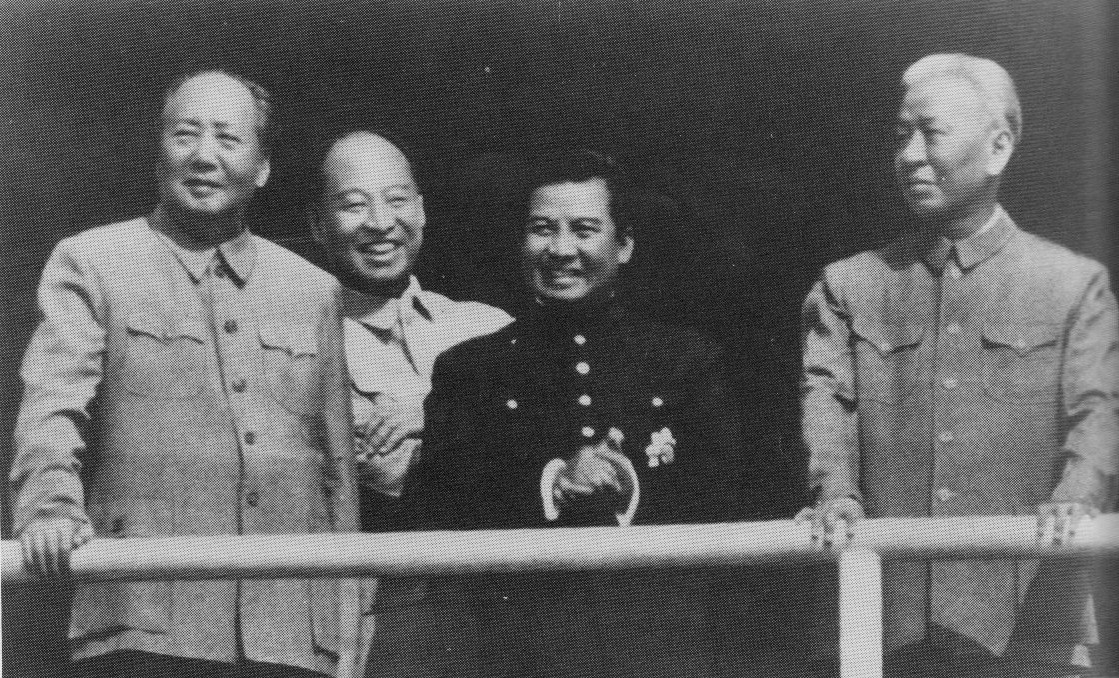
Beijing 1965: (from left) Mao Zedong, Peng Zhen, Norodom Sihanouk and Liu Shaoqi

By 1969, Lon Nol and the rightists were growing increasingly frustrated with Sihanouk. Although the basis for this was partly economic, political considerations were also involved. In particular, the nationalist and anti-communist sensibilities of Lon Nol and his associates meant that Sihanouk's policy of semi-toleration of Viet Cong and People's Army of Vietnam (PAVN) activity within Cambodian borders was unacceptable; Sihanouk, during his swing to the left in 1963–66, had negotiated a secret arrangement with Hanoi whereby in return for the guaranteed purchase of rice at inflated prices, the port of Sihanoukville was opened for weapons shipments to the Viet Cong. Besides rightist nationalists, liberal modernising elements within the Sangkum, headed by In Tam, had also become increasingly alienated by Sihanouk's autocratic style.

== Overthrow of Sihanouk ==
In early March 1970, anti-Vietnamese demonstrations occurred in Cambodia while Sihanouk was touring Europe, the Soviet Union and China. William Shawcross has suggested that Lon Nol planned the first demonstrations in eastern Cambodia on 8 March. On 11 March in Phnom Penh, crowds, said to have been organised by Lon Nol's brother, Lon Non, attacked the embassies of North Vietnam and the PRGR South Vietnam. Vietnamese residences, businesses and churches were also attacked. Some reports indicate Sihanouk's involvement in the preparations, or acquiescence, of the demonstrations, in the hope that they would lead Moscow and Beijing to pressure North Vietnam to reduce its presence in Cambodia.

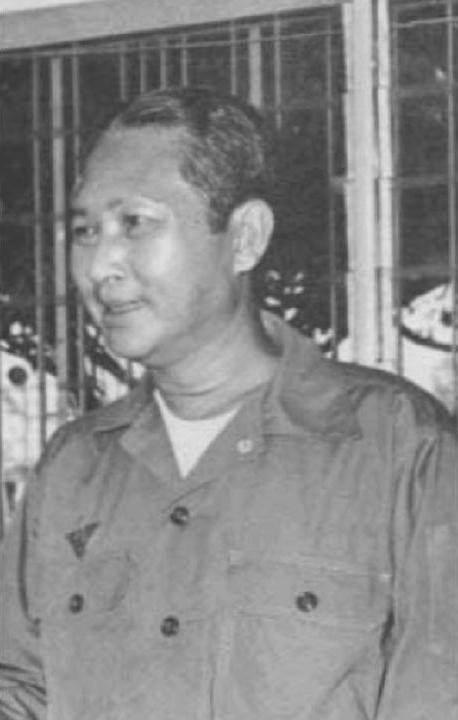
Lon Nol, early 1970s

The riots escalated beyond the government's control – although this was likely done with a degree of encouragement from Lon Nol and Sirik Matak – and the embassy was sacked. Inside, a "contingency plan" was allegedly found for the communists to occupy Cambodia. On 12 March, Sirik Matak cancelled North Vietnam's trade agreement that gave access to Cambodian goods. Lon Nol closed the port of Sihanoukville to the North Vietnamese and issued an impossible ultimatum to them: all PAVN and Viet Cong forces were to withdraw from Cambodian soil within 72 hours (on 15 March) or face military action. When, by the morning of 16 March, it was clear that this demand had not been met, some 30,000 youths gathered outside the National Assembly in Phnom Penh to protest against the Vietnamese presence.

From this point, events moved with increasing rapidity. On the same day, the Cambodian Secretary of State for Defence, Colonel Oum Mannorine (Sihanouk's brother-in-law), was scheduled to be questioned by the national legislature on allegations of corruption. The proceedings were adjourned to hear the demonstrators' resolutions. According to Sihanouk, Mannorine had received information that Lon Nol and Sirik Matak were about to precipitate a coup. A group of Mannorine's men, under the command of Phnom Penh's Chief of Police Major Buor Horl, attempted to arrest the plotters, but it was too late. Mannorine, and other key security personnel loyal to Sihanouk, were placed under arrest. After the Assembly adjourned for the day, Sihanouk's mother Queen Kossamak, at Sihanouk's request, summoned Lon Nol and Sirik Matak to the Royal Palace and asked them to end the demonstrations.

It appears to have been sometime during 16 or 17 March that Sirik Matak finally swayed Lon Nol to remove Sihanouk from the government. Lon Nol, who until that point may have been merely hoping that Sihanouk would end his relations with North Vietnam, showed some reluctance to take action against the Head of State: to convince him, Sirik Matak allegedly played him a tape-recorded press conference from Paris, in which Sihanouk threatened to execute them both on his return to Phnom Penh. The Prime Minister remained uncertain, with the result that Sirik Matak, accompanied by three army officers, compelled a weeping Lon Nol to sign the necessary documents at gunpoint.

The next day – 18 March – the army took up positions around the capital, and a debate was held within the National Assembly under In Tam's direction. One member of the Assembly (Kim Phon, later to be killed by pro-Sihanouk demonstrators in Kampong Cham) walked out of the proceedings in protest, though was not harmed at the time. The rest of the assembly voted unanimously to invoke Article 122 of the Cambodian constitution, which withdrew confidence in Sihanouk.

Lon Nol took over the powers of the Head of State on an emergency basis, while the position itself was taken by the President of the General Assembly, Cheng Heng. In Tam was confirmed as President of the Sangkum. The removal of Sihanouk had, therefore, followed essentially constitutional forms rather than being a blatant military takeover. These events marked the foundation of the Khmer Republic.

Queen Kossamak was forced to leave the royal palace by the new government. She was held in house arrest in a suburban villa before being allowed to join her son in Beijing for health reasons in 1973, and died there two years later.

== Claimed U.S. involvement ==
After the coup, Prince Sihanouk accused the U.S. Central Intelligence Agency (CIA) of being behind the coup. While role of the CIA is disputed, the U.S. government is considered to have facilitated the coup "in various collateral ways" and "most [scholars] see at least some American involvement." Ben Kiernan concluded that there was "no evidence of CIA involvement in the 1970 events, but a good deal of evidence points to a role played by sections of the US military intelligence establishment and the Army Special Forces." Similarly, Milton Osborne states that while the CIA was not behind the coup, "the involvement of some American intelligence services is now beyond dispute." Justin Corfield argues that the U.S. government was a "driving force" in the coup, concluding: "The evidence that the US and her allies were involved in the plot is now overwhelming." On the other hand, William Shawcross states that "no direct link between the United States government and Sihanouk's usurpers before the coup has been established," but nevertheless "presents considerable circumstantial evidence—including the testimony of two CIA agents—that the United States was aware of the coup ahead of time and may have played a supporting role." Kenton Clymer summarizes: "In sum, although the precise degree of American involvement remains murky, most scholars have concluded that, at the very least, some military intelligence agents are culpable."

There is evidence that in 1969 Lon Nol established contact and approached the U.S. military establishment to gauge military support for any action against Sihanouk. Samuel R. Thornton, a U.S. Navy Intelligence specialist, told journalist Seymour Hersh that he "gained intimate knowledge of coup preparations as early as late 1968." According to Thornton, the highest levels of the U.S. government approved a plot "to insert a US-trained assassination team disguised as Viet Cong insurgents into Phnom Penh to kill Prince Sihanouk as a pretext for revolution." However, per Thornton, Lon Nol rejected the assassination plot as "criminal insanity" but agreed to the insertion of U.S.-trained forces and U.S. military support in an event of a coup. Kiernan partially confirms Thornton's account: Prom Thos, a senior Minister in the Lon Nol government from 1970 to 1973, said that planning to oust Sihanouk indeed began in 1969 and that "around March 1969 Prince Sirik Matak had argued for the assassination of Sihanouk but that Lon Nol had been against it." According to Thos, in September 1969, Lon Nol made secret contact with nationalist leader Son Ngoc Thanh and began discussing overthrowing Sihanouk; in February 1970—one month before the coup—Thanh informed Nol "of material aid, in the form of the Khmer Special Forces troops still on the US and South Vietnamese payrolls." Similarly, Forrest B. Lindley, a U.S. Army Special Forces captain operating near the Cambodian border, stated that "I was told there would be a change of government in Cambodia. The source was higher up the US Special Forces command system. Two companies of Khmer Special Forces troops were then sent into [Cambodia]" just before the coup. Kiernan thus concludes: "While Thornton's allegation that 'the highest level' of the US government was party to the coup plans remains uncorroborated, it is clear that Lon Nol carried out the coup with at least a legitimate expectation of significant US support."

Both U.S. President Richard Nixon and his National Security Advisor, Henry Kissinger, denied U.S. involvement and said that the coup caught them by surprise.

== Demonstrations against the coup ==
On 23 March, Sihanouk (via Beijing Radio) called for a general uprising against Lon Nol. Large-scale popular demonstrations calling for Sihanouk's return began in Kompong Cham, Takéo Province, and Kampot Province. The demonstrations in Kompong Cham became particularly violent, with two National Assembly deputies, Sos Saoun and Kim Phon, being killed by demonstrators on 26 March after driving to the town to negotiate. Lon Nol's brother, police official Lon Nil, was set upon in the nearby town of Tonle Bet by plantation workers and was also killed.

The demonstrations were suppressed with extreme brutality by the Cambodian army; there were several hundred deaths and thousands of arrests. Some witnesses spoke of tanks being used against crowds of unarmed civilians.

== Aftermath ==
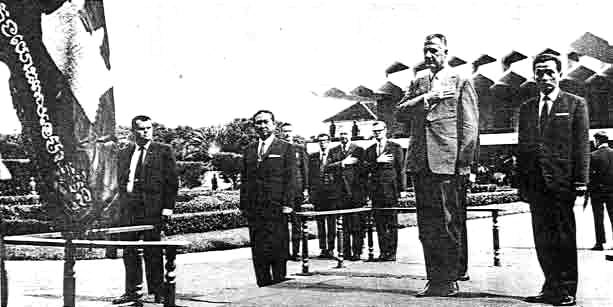
Affirming Cambodia's realignment following the coup, US vice president Spiro Agnew (second right) visited Phnom Penh in August 1970 (Prime Minister Lon Nol, second left, President Cheng Heng, far right). In tandem with Henry Kissinger, Agnew had urged Nixon to invade Cambodia a month after the coup in a meeting on 22 April.

Following the coup, North Vietnam forces invaded Cambodia in 1970 at the request of Khmer Rouge leader Nuon Chea. Thousands of Vietnamese were killed by Lon Nol's anti-communist forces and their bodies dumped in the Mekong River. Attacks against Vietnamese began after a demand by Lon Nol that all Vietnamese communists leave Cambodia. Phnom Penh's North Vietnamese embassy was ravaged by Cambodians.

Cambodia abandoned an international policy of neutrality and aligned with the United States. President Nixon approved the resumption of US Military Aid to the country in April 1970, which saw the FANK grow from 35,000 in March to 202,000 by January 1971.

The Flag of the Khmer Republic adopted after the coup maintained Angkor Wat from the previous flag and added three stars claimed to represent nation, republic and religion; three branches of government, three regions of the country and the three highest elements of Buddhism.

Of the approximately 450,000 Vietnamese in Cambodia, 100,000 left the country and another 200,000 were forcibly repatriated to South Vietnam, reducing the estimated population of ethnic Vietnamese to 140,000 just five months after the coup. These events marked the start of the Cambodian Civil War, pitting Lon Nol's regime backed by US air power against the Khmer Rouge and North Vietnam. Lon Nol fled Cambodia in 1975 right before the Khmer Rouge's seizure of power.

== See also ==
- Bangkok Plot
- Removal of Pen Sovann
