= Lon Nol =

Prime Minister of Cambodia (1966–1967; 1969–1971)

His Excellency Marshal Lon Nol
- លន់ នល់
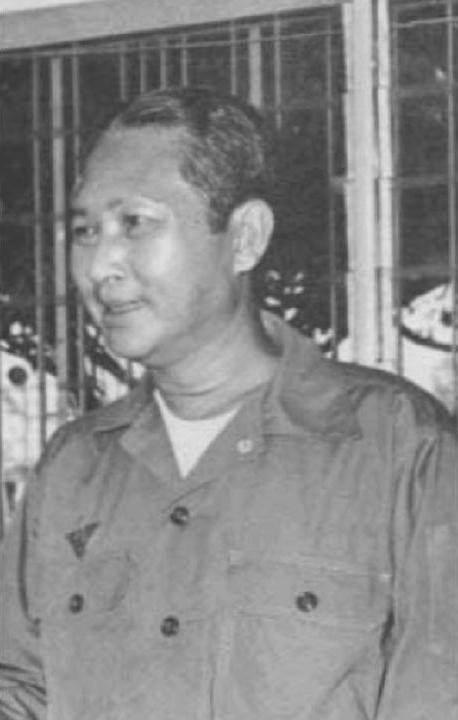
- Nol in 1972

President of the Khmer Republic
- In office 10 March 1972 – 1 April 1975
- Prime Minister: Sisowath Sirik Matak; Son Ngoc Thanh; Hang Thun Hak; In Tam; Long Boret
- Preceded by: Cheng Heng
- Succeeded by: Saukham Khoy (acting)

Effective Ruler of the State of Cambodia and the Khmer Republic (Note: As prime minister between 1970 and 1971.)
- In office 18 March 1970 – 10 March 1972 Serving with Sisowath Sirik Matak (1970)
- President: Cheng Heng
- Prime Minister: Himself
- Preceded by: Norodom Sihanouk (as Chief of State)
- Succeeded by: Unknown

Prime Minister of the Khmer Republic (Note: Prime Minister of the Kingdom of Cambodia until the formal declaration of the republican government on 9 October 1970.) (Note: Other names for the office at the time were Premier, President of the Council of Ministers or Chief of Government)
- In office 14 August 1969 – 20 April 1971
- Monarch: Sisowath Kossamak (1969–1970)
- President: Norodom Sihanouk; Cheng Heng
- Deputy: Sisowath Sirik Matak
- Preceded by: Penn Nouth
- Succeeded by: Sisowath Sirik Matak
- In office 25 October 1966 – 1 May 1967
- Monarch: Sisowath Kossamak
- President: Norodom Sihanouk
- Preceded by: Norodom Kantol
- Succeeded by: Son Sann

Minister of National Defence
- In office 7 June 1968 – 15 November 1971
- Monarch: Sisowath Kossamak (1968–1970)
- President: Cheng Heng; Norodom Sihanouk
- Prime Minister: Penn Nouth; Himself; Sisowath Sirik Matak
- In office 10 September 1959 – 25 October 1966
- Monarchs: Norodom Suramarit; Sisowath Kossamak
- President: Sisowath Monireth; Norodom Sihanouk
- Prime Minister: Norodom Sihanouk; Pho Proeung; Penn Nouth; Nhiek Tioulong (acting); Chau Sen Cocsal (acting); Norodom Kantol

Personal details
- Born: 13 November 1913 Kampong Leav District, Prey Veng Province, Cambodia, French Indochina
- Died: 17 November 1985 (aged 72) St. Jude Medical Center, Fullerton, California, U.S.
- Party: Social Republican (1972–1975); Independent (1970–1972); Sangkum (1955–1970); Khmer Renovation Party (1947–1955)
- Parents: Lon Hin (father); Mau Nuon (mother)
- Relatives: Lon Nil, Lon Non, Antoine Pinto
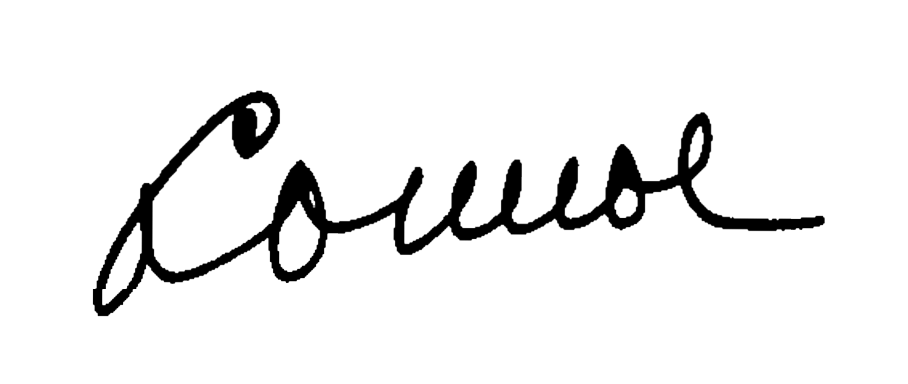
- Signature

Military service
- Allegiance: First Kingdom of Cambodia; Khmer Republic
- Branch/service: Royal Cambodian Army; Khmer National Army
- Years of service: 1952–1975
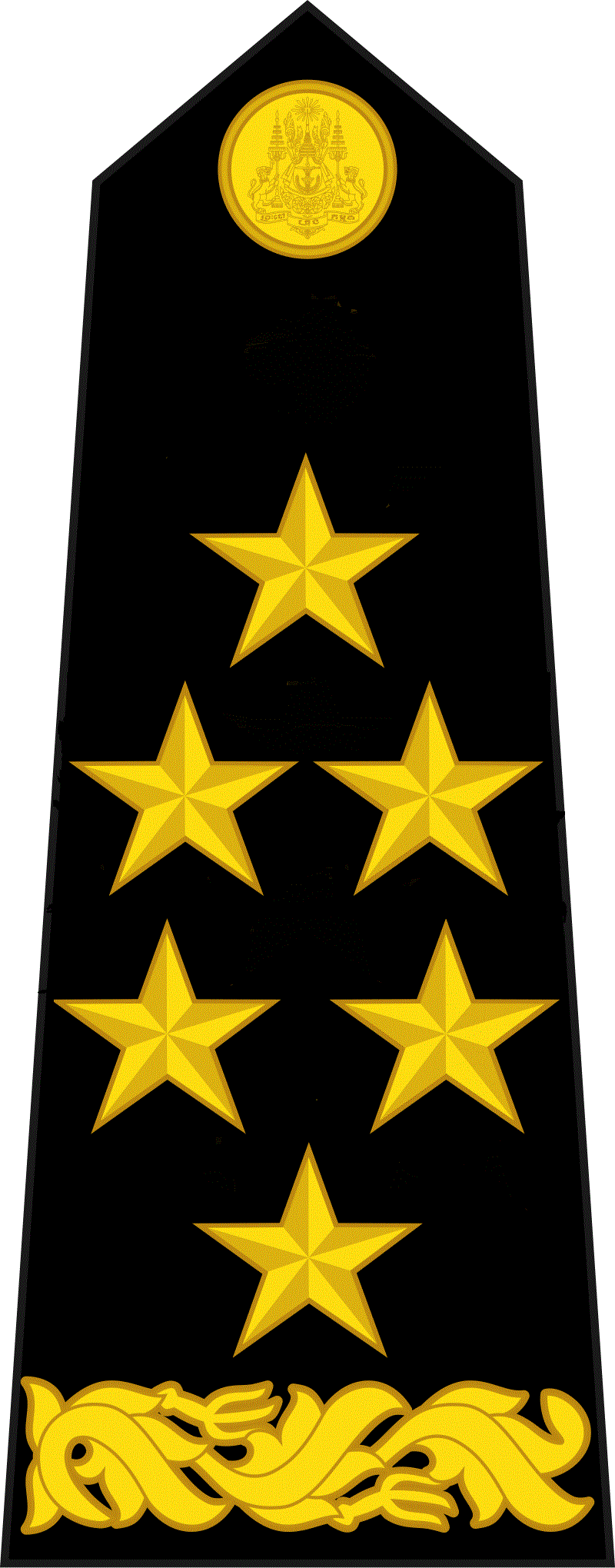
- Rank: Marshal
- Commands: Commander-in-Chief of the Khmer National Armed Forces
- Battles/wars: First Indochina War; Vietnam War; Cambodian Civil War

Lon Nol (Khmer: លន់ នល់, also លន់ ណុល; 13 November 1913 – 17 November 1985) was a Cambodian military officer, politician who served as Prime Minister of Cambodia twice (1966–1967; 1969–1971), as well as serving repeatedly as defence minister and provincial governor. As a right-wing nationalist, he led the military coup of 1970 against Prince Norodom Sihanouk, abolished the monarchy, and established the short-lived Khmer Republic. Constitutionally a semi-presidential republic, Cambodia was de facto governed under a military dictatorship. He was the commander-in-chief of the Khmer National Armed Forces during the Cambodian Civil War and became President of the Khmer Republic on 10 March 1972. His rule was also marked by massacres of Vietnamese Cambodians. On 1 April 1975, as the only president of the republic 16 days before Angkar and the Khmer Rouge captured Phnom Penh, Lon Nol fled to Indonesia and later the United States; first to the state of Hawaii and then to California, where he remained until his death in 1985.

== Early life ==
Lon Nol was born in Prey Veng Province on 13 November 1913, to a family of mixed Khmer-Chinese descent. His father Lon Hin was the son of a Khmer Krom from Tay Ninh Province who later served as a district chief in Siem Reap and Kampong Thom, after making a name for himself "pacifying" bandit groups in Prey Veng. His maternal grandfather was a Chinese immigrant from Fujian who later became the governor of Prey Veng. Nol was educated in the relatively privileged surroundings of the Lycée Chasseloup-Laubat in Saigon, followed by the Cambodian Royal Military Academy.

== Employment in the colonial government ==
Nol found employment with the French colonial civil service in 1937. He became a magistrate, and soon proved himself as an efficient enforcer of French rule against a series of anti-colonial disturbances in 1939. By 1946, he had risen to the post of Governor of Kratie Province. He became an associate of King Norodom Sihanouk, and by the late 1940s, when he set up a right-wing, monarchist, pro-independence political group, was becoming increasingly involved in the developing Cambodian political scene. Joining the army in 1952, he carried out military operations against the Viet Minh.

After independence, Nol's nationalist Khmer Renovation party (along with small right-wing parties headed by Sam Sary and Dap Chhuon) became the core of the Sangkum, the organisation set up by Sihanouk to participate in the 1955 elections. Sangkum won the elections and Sihanouk became prime minister.

== In the administration of Sihanouk, 1955–70 ==
Nol was appointed the Army Chief of Staff in 1955, and commander-in-chief of the armed forces in 1960, as well as serving as Defence Minister. At the time, he was a trusted supporter of Sihanouk, his police being instrumental in the suppression of the small, clandestine communist movement in Cambodia. He was appointed deputy prime minister in 1963. While Sihanouk, in an attempt to distance his country from the effects of the Vietnam War, was pursuing a foreign policy of "extreme neutrality", which involved association with China and toleration of North Vietnamese activity on the eastern borders, Nol remained friendly towards the United States, and indicated that he regretted the ending of US aid after 1963.

The 1966 parliamentary elections represented a major shift in the balance of power towards Lon Nol and the rightist elements of the Sangkum, as conservative and right-wing candidates were overwhelmingly elected. Lon Nol became prime minister, and the following year troops carried out a savage repression of a leftist-inspired revolt, the Samlaut Uprising, in Battambang Province.

Nol was injured in a car crash later in 1967, and temporarily retired from politics. In 1968, however, he returned as Minister of Defence and in 1969 became prime minister a second time, appointing the vocally anti-Sihanouk, and pro-US politician Prince Sisowath Sirik Matak as his deputy.

== 1970 coup ==
Sihanouk later claimed that the 1970 coup against him was the result of an alliance between his longstanding enemy, exiled politician Son Ngoc Thanh and Sirik Matak, with CIA support and planning. Although there are indications that Lon Nol approached the US during 1969 to gauge the likelihood of military support for a coup against Sihanouk, there is no concrete evidence of CIA involvement, though it remains possible some military intelligence agents may have had partial responsibility. It seems likely that in setting in motion the events leading up to the coup, Lon Nol initially intended to strengthen his position against the North Vietnamese with the ultimate aim of preventing their troops (and those of the Viet Cong) from operating within Cambodian borders, and wished to apply pressure on Sihanouk to achieve this. However, events rapidly developed far beyond the original plan, and with the encouragement of Sirik Matak – who wished to see Sihanouk deposed as Head of State – Lon Nol was ultimately to engineer Sihanouk's removal.

While Sihanouk was abroad during March 1970, there was an anti-Vietnamese riot in Phnom Penh on the 11th. On 12 March, Lon Nol and Sirik Matak closed the port of Sihanoukville, through which weapons were being smuggled to the Viet Cong, to the North Vietnamese and issued an ultimatum: all North Vietnamese and Viet Cong forces were to withdraw from Cambodian soil within 72 hours or face military action.

Lon Nol initially refused to countenance Sihanouk being deposed as Head of State; to force his hand, Sirik Matak played him a tape-recorded press conference from Paris, in which Sihanouk blamed them for the unrest and threatened to execute them both on his return to Phnom Penh. However, the Prime Minister remained uncertain as to whether to instigate a vote in the National Assembly. On the night of 17 March, Sirik Matak, accompanied by three army officers, went to the Prime Minister's residence and compelled a weeping Lon Nol to sign the necessary documents at gunpoint.

A vote was taken in the National Assembly on 18 March in which Sihanouk was stripped of his power. Lon Nol assumed the powers of the Head of State on an emergency basis. On 28 and 29 March there were large-scale popular demonstrations in favour of Sihanouk in several provincial cities, but Lon Nol's forces suppressed them, causing several hundred deaths. In the meantime during the Cambodian Campaign of April 1970, US and South Vietnamese forces entered Cambodian territory in pursuit of North Vietnamese and Viet Cong troops. Although they did not initially seek permission from the Cambodian government, Lon Nol subsequently agreed to allow foreign forces to continue operating within his territory. In May, Cambodia under Lon Nol and South Vietnam re-established diplomatic relations with each other, which had been interrupted under Sihanouk. The Khmer Republic was later declared on October 9, and Sihanouk – who had formed a government-in-exile, the GRUNK, incorporating the Khmer Rouge communists – was condemned to death in absentia.

== The Khmer Republic and the Civil War ==
Flag of the Khmer Republic

The Khmer Republic (1970–1975) continued to reject Sihanouk's neutrality policies, especially with regard to the Vietnamese. The regime's policies also carried out mass killings of Vietnamese Cambodians. Ultimately, the republic proved disastrous both militarily and politically. Lon Nol's health started to decline after he suffered a stroke in February 1971. His rule became increasingly erratic and authoritarian: he appointed himself Marshal (a title previously unknown in Cambodia) in April 1971, and in October suspended the National Assembly, stating he would no longer "vainly play the game of democracy and freedom" in wartime. Backed by his forceful, ambitious younger brother General Lon Non, Nol succeeded in reducing the influence of Sirik Matak, In Tam and the other coup leaders. He also insisted on directing many of the Khmer National Armed Forces (French: Forces Armées Nationales Khmères – FANK) operations personally.

In time Lon Nol's regime became completely dependent upon large quantities of American aid that towards the end were not backed by the political and military resolve needed to effectively help the beleaguered republic. By 1975, the government was eventually reduced to holding little more than Phnom Penh and the temple of Preah Vihear in the northern border with Thailand. The FANK was quickly running out of ammunition. Lon Nol was increasingly dependent on the advice of soothsayers and Buddhist mystics: at one point during a Khmer Rouge assault on Phnom Penh, he sprinkled a circular line of consecrated sand in order to defend the city. Finally, on 1 April, he resigned and fled the country into exile, as his name was the first on a list of people the Khmer Rouge had vowed to execute.

== Exile and death ==
Lon Nol first went to Indonesia and then to the United States. He spent time in Hawaii before settling in Fullerton, California, in 1979. He lived with his second wife Sovanna Lon (1943–2013) and several of his nine children until his heart condition-related death on 17 November 1985 at St. Jude Medical Center. He was buried at Loma Vista Memorial Park in Fullerton.

== Political views ==
Despite his actions in deposing Sihanouk, Nol was a firm believer in traditional Cambodian hierarchy: after Sihanouk had been removed he prostrated himself at the Queen Mother's feet to ask forgiveness. He termed his ideology, a blend of nationalism and mysticism, "Neo-Khmerism". He expressed an ambition of reuniting the ethnic Khmers of Cambodia with the Khmer Krom of the Mekong Delta and the Khmer Surin of Thailand, projecting a state of "thirty million" Khmers by the year 2020. Asking his followers to embrace the traditions of what he referred to as Mon-Khmer "holy warriors" (yuthesel), he also encouraged them to refer to him as their "Black Papa", a name referring to the dark skin considered to be the sign of an "authentic" Khmer. In late life, Nol referred to himself as a "black Khmer" and sought to deny that he had partial Chinese ancestry.

== Family ==
His younger brother, Lon Nil, was killed by pro-Sihanouk workers during the Cambodian coup of 1970. Another younger brother, Lon Non, worked as Minister of Interior and ambassador-at-large for the Khmer Republic, and was executed by the Khmer Rouge after the fall of Phnom Penh in April 1975. His grandnephew is French kickboxer Antoine Pinto, grandson of his brother Lon Non.

His son, Lon Rith, established the Khmer Republican Party in 2006.

== Bibliography ==
- Greene, John Robert (1995). The Presidency of Gerald R. Ford. University Press of Kansas. ISBN 9780700606399.
- Europa Publications (2003). A Political Chronology of South East Asia and Oceania. Taylor & Francis. ISBN 9781135356590.
- Lansford, Tom; Muller, Tom, eds. (2012). Political Handbook of the World 2012. SAGE Publications. ISBN 9781608719952.
- United States Senate (1973). Relief and Rehabilitation of War Victims in Indochina. U.S. Government Printing Office.
- Prados, John (2009). Vietnam: The History of an Unwinnable War, 1945–1975. University Press of Kansas. ISBN 9780700616343.
- Royal United Services Institute for Defence Studies (1975). RUSI and Brassey's Defence Yearbook. Brassey's.
- Stich, Rodney (2005). Disavow: Saga of Betrayal. Silverpeak Publisher. ISBN 9780932438423.
- Jones, L. (2011). ASEAN, Sovereignty and Intervention in Southeast Asia. Palgrave Macmillan. ISBN 9780230356276.
- Jagel, Matthew (2023). Khmer Nationalist: Sơn Ngọc Thành, the CIA, and the Transformation of Cambodia. Cornell University Press. ISBN 9781501769344.
- Corfield, Justin J. (1994). Khmers stand up! – A history of the Cambodian government 1970–1975. Centre of Southeast Asian Studies, Monash University. ISBN 0732605652.
- Kiernan, B. (2004). How Pol Pot came to Power. Yale University Press. ISBN 9780300102628.
- Marks, Paul (2000). "China's Cambodia Strategy". Parameters (Autumn 2000): 92–108. ISSN 0031-1723. Archived from the original on 25 September 2002.
- Shawcross, William (1979). Sideshow: Kissinger, Nixon, and the Destruction of Cambodia. Simon & Schuster.

Political offices
Preceded by Prince Norodom Kantol	Prime Minister of Cambodia; 1966–1967	Succeeded by Son Sann
Preceded by Penn Nouth	Prime Minister of the Khmer Republic; 1969–1972	Succeeded by Sisowath Sirik Matak
Preceded by Cheng Heng (Head of State)	President of the Khmer Republic; 1972–1975	Succeeded by Saukam Khoy (Head of State)
