= List of heads of state of Cambodia =

Head of State of Cambodia
- ប្រមុខរដ្ឋនៃកម្ពុជា
- Royal arms

- Royal standard

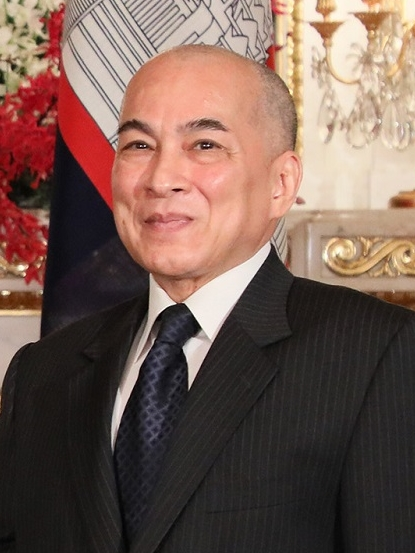
- Incumbent; Norodom Sihamoni (as King) since 14 October 2004
- Style: His Majesty
- Type: Head of state
- Residence: Khemarin Palace (official); The Royal Residence (secondary)
- Seat: Phnom Penh (official); Siem Reap (secondary)
- Appointer: Royal Council of the Throne
- Term length: Life tenure
- Formation: c. 7 March 1848 (178 years ago)
- First holder: Ang Duong (as King)

This is a list of heads of state of Cambodia from the accession of King Ang Duong in 1848 to the present day. It lists various heads of state which served since the end of the interregnum in 1848 during the late post-Angkor period, under several different regimes and with various titles.

From 1848 onward, there have been 11 heads of state (acting heads of state are not counted).

The current head of state of Cambodia is King Norodom Sihamoni, since his election by the Royal Council of the Throne on 14 October 2004.

== Titles ==
- 1848–1960: King of Cambodia (under French protectorate in 1863–1945 and 1945–1953, and Japanese puppet state in 1945)
- 1960: President of the Regency Council
- 1960–1972: Chief of State of Cambodia
  - 1970–1972: Provisional President
- 1972–1975: President of the Khmer Republic
- 1975: President of the Supreme Committee
- 1975–1976: President of the State Presidium/Chief of State
- 1976–1979: Chairman of the State Presidium
- 1979–1981: Chairman of the People's Revolutionary Council
- 1981–1993: President of the Council of State
- 1993: Chief of State of Cambodia and Chairman of the Supreme National Council
- 1993–present: King of Cambodia

== List of officeholders ==
Political parties

Sangkum
Social Republican Party (PRS)
National United Front of Kampuchea (FUNK)
Communist Party of Kampuchea (CPK)
Kampuchean People's Revolutionary Party (KPRP) → Cambodian People's Party (CPP)

Other factions

Military
Independent

Note: Dates in italics indicate de facto continuation of reign/office.

=== Monarchy ===
| No. | Portrait | Name (Birth–Death) | Elected | Reign/Tenure | | | House | Claim |
| No. | Portrait | Name (Birth–Death) | Elected | Start | End | Duration | House | Claim |
|---|---|---|---|---|---|---|---|---|
| 1 | | Ang Duong អង្គឌួង (1796–1860) | — | c. 7 March 1848 | 19 October 1860 | c. 12 years, 226 days | Oudong | Son of Ang Eng |
| 2 | | Norodom នរោត្តម (1834–1904) | — | 19 October 1860 | 24 April 1904 | 43 years, 188 days | Norodom | Son of Ang Duong |
| 3 | | Sisowath ស៊ីសុវតិ្ថ (1840–1927) | — | 27 April 1904 | 9 August 1927 | 23 years, 104 days | Sisowath | Son of Ang Duong Half-Brother of Norodom |
| 4 | | Sisowath Monivong ស៊ីសុវត្ថិ មុនីវង្ស (1875–1941) | — | 9 August 1927 | 23 April 1941 | 13 years, 257 days | Sisowath | Son of Sisowath |
| 5 | | Norodom Sihanouk នរោត្តម សីហនុ (1922–2012) | — | 24 April 1941 | 2 March 1955 | 13 years, 312 days | Norodom | Grandson of Sisowath Monivong |
| 6 | | Norodom Suramarit នរោត្តម សុរាម្រិត (1896–1960) | — | 2 March 1955 | 3 April 1960 | 5 years, 32 days | Norodom | Son-in-law of Sisowath Monivong Father of Norodom Sihanouk |
| — | | Chuop Hell ជួប ហ៊ែល (1909–c. 1975); Acting Chief of State of Cambodia (Note: Hell simultaneously served as the President of the National Assembly, from 1958 to 1962.) | — | 3 April 1960 | 6 April 1960 | 3 days | — | |
| — | | Sisowath Monireth ស៊ីសុវត្ថិ មុន្នីរ៉េត (1909–1975); President of the Regency Council (Note: Other members of the Regency Council were Sisowath Kossamak and Norodom Sihanouk.) | — | 6 April 1960 (Note: Monireth took the office on 6 April, however the Cambodian Crown Council already met on 4 April and decided that Monireth becomes the regent; he also took the oath on the same day.) | 13 June 1960 | 68 days | Sisowath | Uncle of Norodom Sihanouk Son of Sisowath Monivong |
| — | | Chuop Hell ជួប ហ៊ែល (1909–c. 1975); Acting Chief of State of Cambodia | — | 13 June 1960 | 20 June 1960 | 7 days | — | |
| (5) | | Norodom Sihanouk នរោត្តម សីហនុ (1922–2012) (Note: From January 1970 onwards, Cheng Heng acted for Norodom Sihanouk, while he was abroad.) | 1960 | 14 June 1960 (Note: Elected on 13 or 14 June 1960. The formal investiture was on 14 June, while on 20 June Sihanouk was officially appointed as Chief of State.) | 18 March 1970 | 9 years, 277 days | Norodom | Son of Norodom Suramarit Nephew of Sisowath Monireth |
| — | | Sisowath Kossamak ស៊ីសុវត្ថិ កុសមៈ (1904–1975) (Note: After the death of King Norodom Suramarit, his consort Queen Sisowath Kossamak served as monarch for ceremonial purposes only (as a "symbol, incarnation, and representative" of the dynasty), while the powers of head of state were delegated to her son Norodom Sihanouk, who was appointed "Chief of State" whose powers equal that of a monarch.) | — | 20 June 1960 | 9 October 1970 | 10 years, 111 days | Sisowath | Daughter of Sisowath Monivong Sister of Sisowath Monireth Consort of Norodom Suramarit Mother of Norodom Sihanouk |
| — | | Cheng Heng ឆេង ហេង (1910–1996); Acting Chief of State | 1970 | 18 March 1970 (Note: Elected on 19 March 1970, took oath on 21 March.) | 9 October 1970 | 205 days | — | |

=== Republic ===
| No. | Portrait | Name (Birth–Death) | Elected | Term of office | | | Political party |
| No. | Portrait | Name (Birth–Death) | Elected | Took office | Left office | Time in office | Political party |
|---|---|---|---|---|---|---|---|
| 7 | | Cheng Heng ឆេង ហេង (1910–1996) (Note: Sometime between October 1970 and May 1971, In Tam was Interim Chief of State.) | — | 9 October 1970 | 10 March 1972 | 1 year, 153 days | Independent |
| 8 | | Lon Nol លន់ នល់ (1913–1985) | 1972 | 10 March 1972 | 1 April 1975 | 3 years, 22 days | PRS (Note: Independent until 10 June 1972.) / Military |
| — | | Saukam Khoy សូកាំ ខូយ (1915–2008); Acting for Lon Nol | — | 1 April 1975 | 12 April 1975 | 11 days | PRS / Military |
| — | | Sak Sutsakhan សក់ ស៊ុតសាខន (1928–1994) "Leader of the Government" President of the Supreme Committee (Note: Sutsakhan was both head of state (Interim Chief of State) and head of government as President of the Supreme Committee.) | 1975 | 12 April 1975 | 17 April 1975 | 5 days | Military |
| (5) | | Norodom Sihanouk នរោត្តម សីហនុ (1922–2012) | — | 25 April 1975 | 5 April 1976 | 346 days | FUNK Independent |
| 9 | | Khieu Samphan ខៀវ សំផន (born 1931) | 1976 | 13 April 1976 | 7 January 1979 | 2 years, 269 days | CPK |
| 10 | | Heng Samrin ហេង សំរិន (born 1934) | — | 8 January 1979 | 6 April 1992 | 13 years, 89 days | KPRP |
| 10 | | Heng Samrin ហេង សំរិន (born 1934) | — | 8 January 1979 | 6 April 1992 | 13 years, 89 days | CPP |
| — | | Chea Sim ជា ស៊ីម (1932–2015); Interim President of the Council of State | — | 6 April 1992 | 14 June 1993 | 1 year, 69 days | CPP |
| (5) | | Norodom Sihanouk នរោត្តម សីហនុ (1922–2012) | — | 14 June 1993 | 24 September 1993 | 102 days | Independent |

=== Restored monarchy ===
| No. | Portrait | Name (Birth–Death) | Elected | Reign | | | House | Claim |
| No. | Portrait | Name (Birth–Death) | Elected | Start | End | Duration | House | Claim |
|---|---|---|---|---|---|---|---|---|
| (5) | | Norodom Sihanouk នរោត្តម សីហនុ (1922–2012) (Note: Chea Sim was acting head of state in 1993 till 1994 (6 October 1993–8 Apr 1994), 1994 till 1995 (18 May 1994–4 January 1995), 1997 (c. 16 July 1997–c. 7 August 1997) and 2004 (22 July 2004–4 October 2004), under the reign of Norodom Sihanouk.) (Note: Nhek Bun Chhay was acting head of state from 13 July 2004 until 22 July 2004, under the reign of Norodom Sihanouk.) | 1993 | 24 September 1993 | 7 October 2004 | 11 years, 13 days | Norodom | Elected (Son of Norodom Suramarit and Sisowath Kossamak) |
| — | | Chea Sim ជា ស៊ីម (1932–2015); Acting Head of State | — | 7 October 2004 | 14 October 2004 | 7 days | — | |
| 11 | | Norodom Sihamoni នរោត្តម សីហមុនី (born 1953) (Note: Chea Sim acted for Norodom Sihamoni, while he was abroad until 20 October 2004.) (Note: Say Chhum was acting head of state from September 2019 until c. October 2020, from August 2022 until c. February 2023 and c. in March 2024, under the reign of Norodom Sihamoni.) (Note: Hun Sen was acting head of state from c. 21 March 2025 until c. 9 September 2025. Hun Sen is again acting head of state since 6 February 2026, under the reign of Norodom Sihamoni. Last reports that Hun Sen was the acting head of state were from 26 September 2026.) | 2004 | 14 October 2004 | Incumbent | 22 years, 38 days | Norodom | Elected (Son of Norodom Sihanouk) |

== See also ==
- Monarchy of Cambodia
- Prime Minister of Cambodia
  - List of prime ministers of Cambodia
- Deputy presidents of the State Presidium of Kampuchea
- Vice President of the State Council of Cambodia
- List of de facto leaders of the People's Republic of Kampuchea
