= 1960 Cambodian Chief of State election =

- 13 June 1960 or 14 June 1960
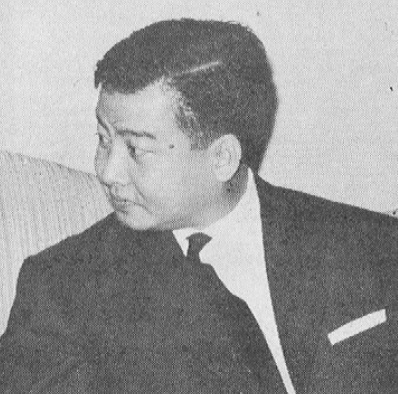
Candidate	Norodom Sihanouk
Party	Sangkum
Chief of State before election
Chuop Hell (acting)
Sangkum
Elected Chief of State
Norodom Sihanouk
Sangkum

A election to determine the Chief of State was held on 13 June or 14 June 1960, after the result of the policy referendum on 5 June were the majority approved the policies of Norodom Sihanouk, like that the new elected Head of State acquires the powers and prerogatives of a sovereign. Besides that Sihanouk wasn't yet elected as Chief of State.

== Aftermath ==
Norodom Sihanouk was elected and took office on 14 June, while he was supposed to be the Chief of State for life, he was replaced by Cheng Heng on 18 March 1970, after the success of the coup d'état on the same day.
