= List of presidents of the National Assembly (Cambodia) =

President of the National Assembly
- ប្រធានរដ្ឋសភា
- Seal of the National Assembly
- Incumbent; Khuon Sudary since 22 August 2023
- National Assembly
- Style: Samdech Maha Rathsapheathika Thipadei; Samdech Rathsaphea Thipadei
- Status: Presiding officer
- Member of: Royal Council of the Throne
- Appointer: Elected by the National Assembly
- Term length: Five years
- Formation: 1 September 1946; 80 years ago
- Salary: 11,536,000 KHR ($2,872 USD)
- Website: national-assembly.org.kh

The president of the National Assembly (Khmer: ប្រធានរដ្ឋសភា, Brâthéan Rôdthâsâphéa [prɑtʰiən rɔətsapʰiə]) is the presiding officer of the lower chamber of the legislature.

== Presidents of the National Assembly (1946–70) ==
Presidents of the National Assembly of Cambodia from 1946 to 1970.

Name	Took office	Left office	Political party	Notes
Ieu Koeus	September 1946	September 1949	Democratic Party (Cambodia)	
Son Sann	September 1951	1952	Democratic Party (Cambodia)	
Khuon Nay	1952	January 1953	Democratic Party (Cambodia)	
Svay So	January 1953	January 1953	Democratic Party (Cambodia)	
Oum Chheang Sun	October 1955	January 1956	Sangkum	
Sim Var	January 1956	October 1956	Democratic Party (Cambodia)	
Ek Yi Oun	1956	?	Sangkum	
?	?	April 1958		
Chuop Hell	April 1958	April 1962	Sangkum	
Chau Sen Cocsal Chhum	1962	1963	Sangkum	
Ung Hong Sath	1963	October 1966	Sangkum	
Chau Sen Cocsal Chhum	1966	October 1968	Sangkum	
Cheng Heng	October 1968	1970	Social Republican Party	

== Presidents of the National Assembly (1970–75) ==
Presidents of the National Assembly of the Khmer Republic from 1970 to 1975.

Portrait	Name (Birth-Death)	In office		Party
Portrait	Name (Birth-Death)	From	To	Party
	Ek Yi Oun (acting)	1970	1970	Sangkum
	In Tam អ៊ិន តាំ (1916-2006)	18 March 1970	11 March 1971	Democratic
	Yem Sambaur យ៉ែម សំបូរ (1913-1989)	May 1971	1972	Democratic
	Tan Kimhuon តាន់ គីមហួន	1972	September 1974	
	Ung Bunhor អ៊ឹង ប៊ុនហ៊័រ	September 1974	April 1975	Social Republican Party

== Presidents of the People's Representative Assembly (1976–79) ==
Presidents of the People's Representative Assembly of Democratic Kampuchea from 1976 to 1979.

Portrait	Name (Birth-Death)	In office			Party
Portrait	Name (Birth-Death)	From	To	Duration	Party
	Nuon Chea នួន ជា (1926-2019)	13 April 1976	7 January 1979	2 years, 269 days	CPK

== Presidents of the National Assembly (1981–93) ==
Presidents of the National Assembly of the People's Republic of Kampuchea (1981-1989) and the State of Cambodia (1989-1993).

Portrait	Name (Birth-Death)	In office			Party
Portrait	Name (Birth-Death)	From	To	Duration	Party
	Chea Sim ជា ស៊ីម (1932-2015)	27 June 1981	14 June 1993	11 years, 352 days	KPRP
	Chea Sim ជា ស៊ីម (1932-2015)	27 June 1981	14 June 1993	11 years, 352 days	CPP

== Presidents of the National Assembly (1993–present) ==
=== Presidents ===
Portrait	Name (Birth–Death)	In office			Party	Parliament
Portrait	Name (Birth–Death)	From	To	Duration	Party	Parliament
	Son Sann សឺន សាន (1911–2000)	14 June 1993	6 October 1993	114 days	BLDP	1 (1993)
	Chea Sim ជា ស៊ីម (1932–2015)	6 October 1993	25 November 1998	5 years, 50 days	CPP	1 (1993)
	Norodom Ranariddh នរោត្ដម រណឫទ្ធិ (1944–2021)	25 November 1998	14 March 2006	7 years, 109 days	FUNCINPEC	2 (1998)
	Norodom Ranariddh នរោត្ដម រណឫទ្ធិ (1944–2021)	25 November 1998	14 March 2006	7 years, 109 days	FUNCINPEC	3 (2003)
	Heng Samrin ហេង សំរិន (1934–)	21 March 2006	22 August 2023	17 years, 154 days	CPP	3 (2003)
	Heng Samrin ហេង សំរិន (1934–)	21 March 2006	22 August 2023	17 years, 154 days	CPP	4 (2008)
	Heng Samrin ហេង សំរិន (1934–)	21 March 2006	22 August 2023	17 years, 154 days	CPP	5 (2013)
	Heng Samrin ហេង សំរិន (1934–)	21 March 2006	22 August 2023	17 years, 154 days	CPP	6 (2018)
	Khuon Sudary ឃួន សុដារី (1952–)	22 August 2023	Incumbent	3 years, 49 days	CPP	7 (2023)

=== Vice-Presidents ===
Name	Term	Party
First Vice-Presidents
Heng Samrin	1998–2006	CPP
Nguon Nhel	2006–2014	CPP
Kem Sokha	2014–2015	CNRP
You Hockry	2017–2018	FUNCINPEC
Nguon Nhel	2018–2021	CPP
Cheam Yeab	2021–present	CPP
Second Vice-Presidents
Nguon Nhel	1997–2006	CPP
Say Chhum	2006–2012	CPP
Khuon Sudary	2012–2014	CPP
Nguon Nhel	2014–2018	CPP
Khuon Sudary	2018–2023	CPP
Vong Sauth	2023–present	CPP

== Sources ==
- Various editions of The Europa World Year Book
