= Sak Sutsakhan =

Cambodian politician and soldier

Lieutenant General Sak Sutsakhan
- សក់ ស៊ុតសាខន

Chairman of the Supreme Committee
- In office 13 April 1975 – 17 April 1975
- Prime Minister: Long Boret
- Preceded by: Saukham Khoy (acting) as President of the Khmer Republic
- Succeeded by: Norodom Sihanouk as President of the State Presidium

Minister of National Defence
- In office 5 November 1971 – 17 April 1975
- President: See list: Cheng Heng; Lon Nol; Saukham Khoy; Himself
- Prime Minister: See list: Lon Nol; Sisowath Sirik Matak; Son Ngoc Thanh; Hang Thun Hak; In Tam; Long Boret
- Preceded by: Lon Nol
- Succeeded by: Son Sen

Personal details
- Born: 8 February 1928 Battambang, Cambodia, French Indochina
- Died: 29 April 1994 (aged 66) Detroit, Michigan, United States
- Party: Liberal Democratic Party
- Other party: Khmer People's National Liberation Front

Military service
- Allegiance: First Kingdom of Cambodia; Khmer Republic; Khmer People's National Liberation Front
- Branch/service: Royal Cambodian Army; Khmer National Army; Khmer People's National Liberation Armed Forces
- Years of service: 1957–1994
- Rank: Lieutenant general
- Battles/wars: Cambodian Civil War

Lieutenant General Sak Sutsakhan (Khmer: សក់ ស៊ុតសាខន; 8 February 1928 – 29 April 1994) was a Cambodian politician and soldier who had a long career in the country's politics. He was the last head of state of the Khmer Republic and minister of defense of the Khmer Republic until the regime was overthrown by the Khmer Rouge led by the new Maoist organization of Angkar in 1975. Sak Sutsakhan formed a pro-US force known as the Khmer Sâ (White Khmer). As a businessman, Sak Sutsakhan notably owned a Dairy Queen franchise in Anaheim, California, US.

== Early life ==
Sutsakhan was born in Battambang. He was the cousin of Nuon Chea, who would later go on to be a prominent member of the Khmer Rouge. He studied at the Royal Military Academy and the French General Staff School in Paris; his subsequent career with the small Cambodian army, the Forces Armées Royales Khmeres (FARK) resulted in his rapid promotion, and under the Sangkum regime of Prince Norodom Sihanouk he became the world's youngest Minister of Defence in 1957 at the age of 29.

== The Khmer Republic ==
Following the Cambodian coup of 1970, in which Prince Norodom Sihanouk was deposed by General Lon Nol, Sutsakhan continued his career within the army, now renamed the Khmer National Armed Forces (FANK), its substantial expansion in 1971–75. Formerly held the position of Minister of Defense, was the commander of the FANK Special Forces, and had a good reputation amongst U.S. diplomats and military advisors as a competent senior officer, as well as a capable and non-corrupt politician.

After the U.S. embassy staff and acting President Saukam Khoy departed Phnom Penh on April 13 after Operation Eagle Pull, a seven-member Supreme Committee, headed by Lieutenant-General Sak Sutsakhan, assumed the authority over the collapsing Republic. Sutsakhan took over the post of Head of State and chaired the Governing Council that attempted to negotiate a conditional ceasefire with the Khmer Rouge, who were besieging Phnom Penh. Sutsakhan remained in the capital until the communist forces entered it on April 17, escaping with his family on one of the last Khmer Air Force helicopters to leave the Olympic Stadium. Sutsakhan was married and had four children.

== Exile and the KPNLF ==
Sutsakhan settled in the United States, and became an American citizen. After the Khmer Rouge had been expelled by Vietnamese forces in 1979, politician Son Sann and former FANK General Dien Del set up the Khmer People's National Liberation Front (KPNLF), a non-communist and largely republican movement dedicated to expelling the regime installed by the Vietnamese (the People's Republic of Kampuchea). The KPNLF was initially a coalition of various disparate 'resistance' and even semi-bandit groups based in the refugee camps along the Thai-Cambodian border; however the recruitment of Sutsakhan, who arrived from the US in 1981, helped to lend considerable legitimacy to the cause. Sutsakhan became commander of the KPNLF's armed wing, the Khmer People's National Liberation Armed Forces (KPNLAF), and attempted to impose a centralized structure on its armed factions.

In 1982 a formal political alliance, the Coalition Government of Democratic Kampuchea, was formed between the KPNLF, the FUNCINPEC royalists headed by Sihanouk and the remaining forces of the Khmer Rouge. After 1985 Sutsakhan was to meet with Son Sen of the Khmer Rouge and Prince Norodom Ranarridh, Sihanouk's son, who commanded FUNCINPEC's military arm, the Armée Nationale Sihanoukiste (ANS), to arrange military cooperation between the three movements.

By 1985, Sutsakhan and Sann began to disagree on the conduct of the war, especially on the issue of cooperation with the royalist (ANS), which Sutsakhan favoured. The resulting split in the KPNLF hampered the operations of its armed forces: despite some initial successes in the northwest of Cambodia, the KPNLAF was shattered by a Vietnamese offensive in 1984–1985 and was largely restricted to guerrilla warfare after this point.

After the Paris Peace Accords of 1991, Sutsakhan was to split from Son Sann and the KPNLF, and formed the Liberal Democratic Party.

== Death ==
He died in Detroit on April 29, 1994. His corpse was cremated and his ashes were scattered in Lake Michigan.

== Publications ==
In 1980, Sutsakhan published The Khmer Republic at War and the Final Collapse, which remains a major source of information on the Cambodian Civil War.

== See also ==
- Cambodian Civil War
- Khmer National Armed Forces
- Khmer Republic
- Khmer Rouge
- Operation Eagle Pull
- Royal Cambodian Armed Forces

== Sources ==
- Kenneth Conboy, FANK: A History of the Cambodian Armed Forces, 1970-1975, Equinox Publishing (Asia) Pte Ltd, Djakarta 2011. ISBN 978-979-3780-86-3
- Kenneth Conboy, Kenneth Bowra, and Mike Chappell, The War in Cambodia 1970-75, Men-at-arms series 209, Osprey Publishing Ltd, London 1989. ISBN 0-85045-851-X
- Justin Corfield and Laura Summers, Historical Dictionary of Cambodia, Asian/Oceanian Historical Dictionaries No. 43, Scarecrow Press, Inc., Lanham, Maryland, and Oxford 2003. ISBN 0-8108-4524-5 –
- Justin J. Corfield, A History of the Cambodian Non-Communist Resistance 1975-1983, Clayton, 1991. ASIN B00KMX8C2S
- Justin J. Corfield, Khmers Stand Up! a history of the Cambodian government 1970-1975, Monash Asia Institute, 1994. ISBN 978-0732605650, 0732605652
- Sak Sutsakhan, The Khmer Republic at War and the Final Collapse, U.S. Army Center of Military History, Washington D.C. 1980. – available online at Vietnam.ttu.edu Part 1 PDF, Part 2 (PDF), Part 3 (PDF), Part 4 (PDF).
- Michael Haas, Cambodia, Pol Pot, and the United States: the Faustian pact, Praeger Publishers Inc, New York 1991. ISBN 978-0275940058, 0275940055
- William Shawcross, Sideshow: Kissinger, Nixon and the Destruction of Cambodia, André Deutsch Limited, London 1979. ISBN 0233970770

Preceded by Lon Nol (Head of State)	President of Cambodia; 1975	Succeeded by Norodom Sihanouk (Head of State)
