= 1975 Cambodian President of the Supreme Committee election =

- 13 April 1975

Seven members of the Supreme Committee and the members of the General Assembly Unknown votes needed to win
Candidate	Sak Sutsakhan
Party	Independent (Military)
Electoral vote	Elected
"Leader of the Government" before election
Sak Sutsakhan
Independent (Military)
Elected President of the Supreme Committee
Sak Sutsakhan
Independent (Military)

On 13 April 1975, the Supreme Committee elected their President, who was both head of state (Interim Chief of State) and head of government.

== Background ==
After Lon Nol fled on 1 April 1975, Saukam Khoy became Acting President of the Khmer Republic. He ruled until 12 April 1975, the day when he was evacuated during the Operation Eagle Pull, his duties were taken away at 2 p.m. the same day by the General Assembly which was convened hours before at 8:30 a.m. Between 10 p.m. and 11 p.m., the majority of both houses of the parliament voted for the establishment of a committee and its seven members. Afterwards, Premier Long Boret announced that the Supreme Committee was established to govern the country for three months and the parliament gave it full power, in a subsequent broadcast Sak Sutsakhan said that he took over the leadership of the new government.

== Election ==
Besides that, Sak Sutsakhan already announced that he is the "Leader of the Government", the Supreme Committee held its first meeting on 13 April. During their first session, the Supreme Committee elected Sak Sutsakhan as their President. However, before he assumed the powers, the General Assembly needed to approve the election of him, which they did after a discussion.

== Aftermath ==
The leadership of Sak Sutsakhan was short-lived and only lasted until 17 April 1975, the day when Phnom Penh fell.
