= Samlaut Uprising =

1967–1968 Cambodian left-wing uprising

- Samlaut Rebellion; Battambang Revolts; Part of the Cambodian Civil War
- Date: 2 April 1967 – 8 April 1968 (1 year, 2 months and 4 days)
- Location: Cambodia; primarily Samlout District, Battambang
- Caused by: Sihanouk's strong-handed and corrupt Sangkum regime
- Result: See aftermath: Royal Government victory; Start of the Cambodian Civil War; Growing revolutionary Kampuchean movement against the royal government; Mass destruction of villages and widespread displacement of peasants

Parties
(Cambodia) Royal Government; (Cambodia) PAB (Note: Provincial Administration of Battambang); MDN; FARK; ARK; AVRK; (Cambodia) Khmer National Police	First Phase: (Cambodia) Rural Peasants; Support: CPK; Guerilla forces; Second Phase: CPK; Guerilla forces

Lead figures
(Cambodia) Norodom Sihanouk; (Cambodia) Lon Nol (Note: He served as Prime Minister during 1967 and served as Minister of National Defense during the Samlaut Uprising); (Cambodia) Penn Nouth (1968); (Cambodia) In Tam (Note: As the Governor of Battambang (1967-1968)); (Cambodia) Nhiek Tioulong; (Cambodia) Ngo Hou	Pol Pot; Nuon Chea; Khieu Samphan; Hou Yuon; Hu Nim; Ros Nhim

Casualties and losses
First Phase: 4 soldiers KIA; 1 officer killed Second Phase: 105 killed 90 wounded	First Phase: ~273 rebels captured 20 killed Second Phase: 255 killed 33 wounded 128 arrested
- 5 guards and village chiefs ambushed 1 former district chief killed, 1 government agent wounded Several suspected communists were arrested and executed

The Samlaut Uprising, also called the Samlaut rebellion or Battambang revolts, consisted of two significant phases of revolt that first broke out near Samlaut in Battambang Province and subsequently spread into surrounding provinces of Cambodia in 1967–1968. The movement was largely made up of dissident rural peasantry led by a group of discontented leftist intellectuals against Prince Norodom Sihanouk’s political organization, the Sangkum regime.

The rebellion first erupted in early 1967 in the Samlaut subdistrict when hundreds of frustrated peasants, tired of government policies, mistreatment by local military, land displacement, and other poor socio-economic conditions. They then revolted against the government, killing two soldiers on the morning of April 2. In the following weeks, the revolt expanded with more destruction of government property and personnel.

By June 1967, four thousand or more villagers had fled their homes in southern Battambang Province into the forest to join the growing group of rebels and escape the military troops sent by Sihanouk. In early 1968, Cambodia experienced a more organized second uprising that expanded both geographically and politically through months of re-grouping, recruitment and propaganda processes, and was much more widespread and destructive than the first.

Some academics such as Ben Kiernan and Donald Kirk, see the Samlaut rebellion as the beginnings of the Cambodian revolutionary movement (the Cambodian Civil War) that eventually led to the victory of the Khmer Rouge and the establishment of Democratic Kampuchea.

Kiernan says that the rebellion was the “baptism of fire for the small but steadily growing Cambodian revolutionary movement” and Kirk mentions that it was “a prelude, in a microcosm, of the conflict that would sweep across the country three years later.”

== Causes, background and origins ==
Narratives of this rebellion differ due to the problematic political alignments involved in the Cambodian struggle. The Republican government wanted to portray the Cambodian revolutionary movement as largely a foreign (mainly Vietnamese) transplant and preferred to gloss over the significance of indigenous leftist activity from 1967. Alternatively, F.U.N.K.(National United Front of Kampuchea) wanted to demonstrate unity between Sihanouk supporters and the Khmer Rouge, understating the extent of the development of the revolutionary opposition to Sihanouk before his overthrow.

Historians such as David Chandler and Milton Osborne understand the rebellion as primarily a localized action. According to Chandler, the revolt “sprang from local grievances against injustice and social change, corruption, and ham-fisted government behavior” and the participants “did not respond to orders from the Communist Party of Kampuchea (CPK) central committee”. Milton Osborne writes that the rebellion “was more an outbreak of largely spontaneous resistance to government actions than the first orchestrated challenge from the radicals”.

Apart from Sihanouk's Sangkum regime, other diverging strands contributed to this rebellion. For instance, the rebellion was identified to have communist roots as it was the first part of Pol Pot's social and political two-phased strategy executed by the CPK. Furthermore, even Sihanouk himself was ignorant of this highly internalized and localized conflict, believing it result from foreign instigation.

=== Political and socio-economic conditions ===
With the escalation of the war in South Vietnam in 1965, the colonization of Battambang entered a new phase as thousands of Khmer Krom families began to cross the Vietnam-Cambodia border. The main government settlements were established in Kampot, Kirirom, Kompong Chhnang (Chriev) and Ratanakiri, with Battambang having the largest settlement. Sihanouk's generosity towards them increasingly became a source of grievance for the local inhabitants as they found themselves displaced from their land (many of whom did not even own their land) with unfavorable economic conditions.

==== Political conditions ====
Following the September 1966 election, the National Assembly was dominated by right wing politicians with a minority of left leaning politicians, namely, Khieu Samphan, Hou Youn and Hu Nim, all of whom played highly influential roles in leading the revolts to come. As the newly elected Government asserted its control over Cambodia's provinces, it penetrated the village level. It was supported by the Prime Minister Lon Nol and the Royal Cambodian Army, cracking down heavily on many peasants and pushing the Left towards the defensive. Furthermore, Sihanouk's wavering stance between the Right and Left appeared to be leaning towards the Right as he had imprisoned several Pracheachon party members. It announced his non-endorsement for the September elections.

Sihanouk's allegedly neutralist policy had its roots in the independence struggle against French colonialism where Sihanouk formed alliances with several anti-French guerilla groups, on both the Left and Right. After independence, this neutrality started to diverge as Sihanouk allied himself principally with politicians on the right. He did attempt to ally himself with certain members of the political left, such as Khieu Samphan. However, according to Etcheson, his relations with his domestic left were perfunctory and at most tactical. “The Prince encouraged his security forces to persecute the mass organizations of the Left, especially the main Leftist one, the Pracheachon, and its covert sister organizations in the countryside and the cities.”

Progressively, there appeared to be increasingly visible cracks within the political sphere as respective sides strengthened and consolidated. As the Left gradually co-ordinated its activities, holding demonstrations in the towns, attacking the government, and conducting propaganda in the countryside, the predominantly right-winged government upped its military and economic regulations.

==== Economic conditions ====
While Sihanouk was away in France, Lon Nol had considerable autonomy in effecting his economic policies. Often identified as the main driver of the rebellion, the rammassage du paddy was an efficient system imposed by Lon Nol in early 1967 whereby the government channels (mainly the military) took charge of buying and collecting the rice crops from the peasants. This was in response to the rise of a large rice export black market that greatly affected Cambodia's economy as it was heavily dependent on its taxation of rice exports. Here, farmers illegally sold much of Cambodia's rice to the Viet Cong (VC) across the borders as they paid more as compared to the Cambodian government.

Lon Nol was seriously concerned about the sale of large proportions of the rice crop to the VC or on the Saigon black market, where clandestine sales were handled by local Chinese middlemen who had found friends and worked in conjunction with cells of former Viet Minh sympathizers acting on behalf of the VC. This system provoked an uproar by the rural population in Battambang Province where it was first introduced as many households not only saw their earnings being severely reduced due to the low prices offered for the crops but were also forcibly made to surrender their produce at gunpoint.

Furthermore, the strong intervention and presence of the army in Battambang involved forming co-operatives, forcing villagers to regroup while bearing the obligation of being a co-operative member in paying subscriptions to finance loans that fell into the hands of corrupt officials. In turn, they were given insecticides that were often mediocre quality or even false substitutes. Also, army officials could engage in illegal smuggling across the borders. Generally, activities of the army in Battambang prior to the revolt were heavy-handed and often brutal, alienating and enraging the inhabitants.

Another cause of growing peasant resentment and unrest would be attributed to the severe exploitation or confiscation of villagers by landowners. For instance, in Pailin Province, arable land was bought from the villages and converted into plantations for the expanding fruit industry, dominated by the Chinese and Burmese. The Khmer peasants had to work for them as unskilled laborers or were displaced from their homeland. In other areas like the Andoeuk Hep district, peasants faced harsh conditions due to the unsustainability and unproductivity of the cotton industry – due to the high cost of labour and materials in intensive cotton cultivation, peasants cultivated large areas of land with low yields per hectare. The situation was further exacerbated by the increasing susceptibility to encroaching weeds and insects, greatly decreasing the yields. This caused large areas of land to lose their value, many peasants had to find other jobs while facing high indebtedness and landlessness.

Peasant discontent was contributed by the growing domination by the Chinese and other landowners, including Government officials. The continual buying and selling of land due to failed crops produced increasing impoverishment and a class conflict. Centered on rapidly growing fruit plantations, it was a conflict between a ‘rich and enterprising Chinese bourgeoisie which has taken possession of the land, and the alienated, indebted, and already semi-independent village communities.”

According to Kiernan, it was clear that “corruption, the misuse of the military and other authority, and increasing impoverishment, in the Samlaut, Pailin and Andoeuk Hep districts, for example, created a vast reservoir of peasant unrest that lacked only a reasonably sophisticated leadership. By early 1967, that leadership had begun to take shape and it provided, as well as a sympathetic and purposeful ideology, the guidance to enable an already disaffected peasantry to carry out a serious and effective rebellion.”

=== Khmer Rouge rebels ===
Vietnamese and Chinese communists played a small role in planting the seeds of rural revolt. For instance, after 1945, the Vietnamese Communists were active in their Cambodian oriented efforts, sending cadres into the country to encourage, encadred and attempt to establish Communist hegemony over the independence movement. In September 1960, the Communist Party of Kampuchea (CPK) was founded.

The rebellion was not simply a result of plotting by the radical left, though small pro-communist groups had been established in Battambang for years. CPK agitators like Khieu Samphan did play a part in fanning peasant discontent. They were aided by widespread resentment at falling crop prices, bankruptcy, and military actions.

Some historians, such as Ben Kiernan, have stated that evidence points to the fact that the clandestine CPK was in fact planning an uprising across the country, citing the fact that the demonstrations rapidly spread to other, widely separated provinces. It is argued that some of the disturbances in 1967 were part of a coordinated effort by the leftists to destabilise Sihanouk's regime, though the official Khmer Rouge historiography given by Pol Pot later sought to deny this, stating its open rebellion only occurred in January 1968 and that the Samlaut incident was "premature" and surprised the communist party

“The people armed themselves with knives, axes, clubs, and other weapons they could lay their hands on to attack police stations and military garrisons,” “[But] the Party Central Committee had not yet decided on general armed insurrection throughout the country."

— Pol Pot

== Rebellion ==
=== 1967 uprising ===
Armed resistance by the left broke out in April, erupting in the Samlaut area in northwestern Battambang Province, long noted for large landowners and great disparities of wealth. On 2 April 1967, angry peasants attacked the soldiers who were collecting rice from the villagers, killing two of them and stole several rifles. In the afternoon, 200 rebels marched carrying banners denouncing the Lon Nol government and U.S. imperialism, and attacked the Royal Khmer Socialist Youth agricultural settlement at Stung Kranhoung, the most obvious symbol of government presence in the area, the source of the villagers’ grievances and official mistreatment, as the target for their first organized display of force. By evening they had defeated guards from two other posts and executed a mayor. Over the next few weeks, the rural movement caused destruction to public infrastructure, and agricultural settlements, seized weaponry and killed several army and village officials.

During this initial outbreak, Sihanouk was on one of his frequent sojourns in France, and Lon Nol, the prime minister, responded harshly. A platoon of paratroopers and national police were sent into the region to protect the population, allegedly having been offered a bounty for each severed head of a rebel or leftist that they sent back to Phnom Penh. There, they discovered a rebel hide-out, their ration depots, stolen weaponry and captured 73 rebels. In the subsequent three weeks, nearly 200 rebels were captured and 19 killed, but rebel operations continued to spread geographically. On 22 April, Sihanouk charged five leftist deputies, including Khieu Samphan, Hou Yuon and Hu Nim with the responsibility for the rebellion, however, Khieu and Hou managed to disappear into the maquis. Hu Nim persisted in his attempts to maintain a public profile and to work alongside the government. Still, after repeated warnings from Sihanouk, he departed by the year's end. On 5 May, workers from the Kompong Cham textile facotory, as well as its director, and students from Kompong Cham University staged a demonstration with banners and loudspeakers, blaming the government for the disappearance and suspected execution of Khieu and Hou.

Despite Sihanouk's attempts to offer amnesty to the local rebels, the rebellion spread to other districts to the north and the east, with many of the villagers fleeing to the maquis to avoid the advancing army battalion. On the eastern side of the country, seventy armed followers of CPK cadre So Phim infiltrated the town of Kandol Chrum, killed a former district chief, and wounded a government agent; Ieng Thirith, another prominent Communist, was seen in Samlaut itself. In several areas across the country, suspected Communists were arrested, driven underground, or in some cases shot. With growing peasant unrest, Sihanouk was ready to sanction the brutal repression of leftist rebels, using the greatest possible force. Lon Nol had been implacable and retribution had ranged from summary execution to the burning of villages. Ghoulish details were provided of trucks filled with severed heads sent from Battambang to Phnom Penh so that Lon Nol would be assured that his programme was being followed.

At the end of April, Lon Nol resigned, though reasons behind his resignation were not clear he was said to have suffered from some form of injury during the period of unrest.

In May and June, the military became even more violent with Royal Cambodian Air Force aircraft bombing and strafing villages and jungle hide-outs, villages burned to the ground or surrounded by the army and peasants massacred. In June, Sihanouk declared that the Samlaut Rebellion was at an end, by which more than 4000 residents had fled into the forests for over a month.

From October 1967 onwards, younger left-wing groups from the towns, including school teachers and ex-students, stepped up their liaisons with previously dormant cells of Communist sympathizers in remote areas like southern Battambang, while others joined the maquis. By the end of 1967, unrest was reported in eleven of the country's eighteen provinces. The Khmer Loeu regions of Mondulkiri Province and Ratanakiri Province fell almost entirely under CPK control by the end of the decade. In December, word had been passed around that the Samlaut rebellion was about to enter another phase.

=== 1968 uprising ===
Peasant support for the revolutionaries was compounded by oppressive processes such as the resumption of rammassage campaigns in late December 1967 and the government’s decision to appoint village headmen and officials directly. Before 1968, villagers elected headmen, although the provincial authorities usually selected the candidates. The central Government intervention represented a significant development in rural administrative repression by Phnom Penh, resented by many peasants who cherished the traditional autonomy of village affairs. Local corruption and increased administrative domination threatened to add to other long-standing peasant grievances. Furthermore, in January, the American escalation of the Vietnam War peaked, instilling paranoia and discontent amongst Kampuchea’s outlawed dissident Left about Cambodia’s potential sell-out to the Americans under Sihanouk.

The CPK’s mid-1967 decision to organize a peasant army to wage all-out armed struggle against the Sihanouk regime could not be implemented immediately. By January 1968, the Battambang rebels were in touch with others in Kompong Chhnang and Kompot. More townspeople and intellectuals who were younger radicals left their jobs and fled to the forests. The rate of town disappearances increased as rural revolt flared in early 1968. A period of planning, preparation and communication between CPK cadres in various regions of Kampuchea continued until 17 January 1968 when the first attack was launched by the Revolutionary Army of Kampuchea (RAK) on a military post at Baydamram in Battambang Province.

This was followed by a series of clashes between troops and rebels, rebel ambushes on government military outposts, attacks on provincial guards, and stealing rifles and weapons. Rebels rounded up families from villages who followed them into the forests – with a successful attack occurring on 25 January as rebels rounded up around 500 families from Thvak, Chisang, Beng Khtum and Samlaut. Rebels were active and widespread, with several rebel camp hideouts set up in forested areas throughout Battambang.

It soon became evident to Sihanouk and Lon Nol that the outbreaks in early 1968 had been well-prepared and more serious than the initial outbreak in Samlaut in April 1967. Signs of unrest were also spotted in northeastern provinces like Ratanakiri as land was taken by the government to set up rubber plantations. In late January, Sihanouk brought back Lon Nol as Minister of Defence and Inspector-General of the Armed Forces.

Fighting continued with increasing intensity until 25 February 1968, when the Khmer Rouge launched their most widespread campaign yet. According to Sihanouk, ‘the blow of 25 February’ was an operation ordered by Khmer Rouge command consisting of a few intellectuals executing a concerted operation against isolated troops where similar movements and tactics were employed in Battambang, Pursat, Takeo, Kampot, Koh Kong, Kompong Chhnang and Kirirom. More than 10,000 villagers from all over took to the forests to join the rebellion as a result of years of propaganda work.

By March 1968, general conditions that prevailed almost everywhere made it suitable for developing a mass-based revolutionary insurrection. This led to the replacement of provincial leaders with military officials and the harsh counter-forces of Lon Nol, including the use of air force to bomb targeted rebel camps in the jungle. Not wanting to accede to the requests of the Khmer Rouge for a liberated zone (withdrawal of government troops from all villages and provinces where the Khmer Rouge are located) under the exclusive control and administration of the resistance, the rebellion continued to intensify throughout March. However, the situation started to turn bleak for the Khmer Rouge, suffering heavier losses against an increasingly consolidated and violent army that destroyed their camps and supplies and a mobilized group of townspeople who supported Sihanouk and went against the peasants.

On 8 April, an important Khmer Rouge network consisting of two large fortified hide-outs and important installations, including a rifle factory at Phnom Veay Chap were destroyed by the army. With the destruction of the Khmer Rouge base and a growing number of casualties and captures, an increasing number of peasants began to surrender and return to their villages, concluding the series of 1968 revolts, at least for the time being.

Ultimately, all these measures increased the rural population's isolation from and resentment of the government, military and the urban elite, strengthening support for the revolutionaries as dissidence continued to persist in the following years.

== Aftermath ==
Although most of the 10,000 or so peasants involved in the February 1968 exodus to the maquis returned to their villages by April and May, the Khmer Rouge still benefitted from a degree of popular support and protection. According to Charles Meyer, after 1967, the Khmer Rouge armed propanganda teams circulated in nearly all the villages in Kampuchea. Since the suppression of their forces, rebels in southern Battambang began to move south-east to link up with the Khmer Rouge in other provinces like Pursat, Kompong Chhnang and Kampong Speu. By mid-1968, they had established a network of bases, calls and lines of communication throughout Kampuchea.

The RAK obtained minimal assistance from the North Vietnamese, the VC and the Chinese. Although North Vietnam had established a special unit in 1966 to train the CPK, it was extremely reluctant to alienate Sihanouk at a time when vital supplies were passing through the port of Sihanoukville and along the Ho Chi Minh Trail to the VC bases along the Cambodia-Vietnam border. Beijing and Moscow also provided Sihanouk with arms, many of which were being used against the insurgents. Perhaps, the indifference of the world communist movement to the Cambodian struggle since early 1967 made a permanent impression on Pol Pot and other Khmer Rouge leaders, shaping their isolated and self-sufficient vision of Democratic Kampuchea.

Sihanouk's policies, economically and politically oppressive Sangkum Regime, condoning of Lon Nol's brutal response to peasant unrest, and initial ignorance of the localized context of the rebellion had paved the way for Cambodia's increasing politicization of significant numbers of peasants, contributing to the growing Cambodian Civil War and influenced the ideological groundings behind Democratic Kampuchea. Such growing dissidence from the beginnings of April 1967 was capitalized on and organized in the 1968 revolts, eventually leading to the growing establishment of the Khmer Rouge-led peasant rebellion that manifested in 1970. when Sihanouk's regime was overthrown by Lon Nol's March 1970 Coup.

== See also ==
- Cambodian coup of 1970
- Cambodian Civil War
- Democratic Kampuchea
- Communist Party of Kampuchea

== Bibliography ==
- Blanadet, Raymond. 1’Institut de Geographie de la Faculte des Lettres de Bordeaux, In Les Cahiers d’Outre-Mer. Vol, 22-3, p. 353-78, 1970.
- Chandler, David P. The Tragedy of Cambodian History. New Haven CT: Yale University Press, 1991.
- Chindawongse, Suriya. “Pol Pot’s Strategy of Survival.” Fletcher Forum of World Affairs 15, no. 1 (1991): 128-145. url: http://dl.tufts.edu/catalog/tufts:UP149.001.00029.00012
- Heder, Stephen. “Kampuchea’s Armed Struggle: The Origins of an Independent Revolution.” Bulletin of Concerned Asian Scholars 11, no.1 (1979): 2-23.
- Hinton, Alexander Laban. Why did they kill?: Cambodia in the shadow of genocide. Vol. 11. Univ of California Press, 2004.
- Jackson, Karl D., ed. Cambodia, 1975-1978: Rendezvous with death. Princeton University Press, 2014.
- Kiernan, Ben. “The Samlaut Rebellion and its Aftermath, 1967-70: The Origins of Cambodia’s Liberation Movement. Part 1 & 2” Melbourne: Monash University Centre of Southeast Asian Studies Working Papers No.4 & 5, 1975
- Kiernan, Ben, and, “The Samlaut rebellion, 1967-68.” In Peasants and Politics in Kampuchea, 1945-1981, edited by Ben Kiernan and Chanthou Boua, 166-193. London: Zed Press; New York: M.E.Sharpe Inc., 1982.
- Kiernan, Ben. How Pol Pot came to power, Yale UP, p. 267-267, 2004
- Martin, Marie Alexandrine. Cambodia: A shattered society. Univ of California Press, 1994.
- Osborne, Milton E. “Farce turns to tragedy.” Sihanouk: prince of light, prince of darkness, 185-201. Australia: Allen & Unwin Pty Ltd, 1994.
- Osborne, Milton E. Before Kampuchea: Preludes to Tragedy. Sydney: George Allen & Unwin, 1979
- Rummel, Rudolph J. Death by government. Transaction Publishers, 1997.
- Tyner, James A. The killing of Cambodia: Geography, genocide and the unmaking of space. Ashgate Publishing, Ltd., 2008.
- Weltig, Matthew S. “From Political Work to Armed Struggle” In Pol Pot's Cambodia, 40-59. Twenty-First Century Books, 2008.
