= 1953 in French Indochina =

- Decades: 1930s; 1940s; 1950s
- See also: Other events of 1953; History of Vietnam

The following lists events that happened during 1953 in French Indochina.

== Events ==
=== May ===
- May 9 - France agrees to the provisional independence of Cambodia with King Norodom Sihanouk.

=== November ===
- November 9 - Laos gains its independence from France.
- November 9 - The Khmer Issarak begins to fight the French Army and Cambodia joins the First Indochina War. The Kingdom of Cambodia is established.
