= 1954 in French Indochina =

- Decades: 1930s; 1940s; 1950s
- See also: Other events of 1954; History of Vietnam

The following lists events that happened during 1954 in French Indochina.

== Events ==
=== March ===
- March 13 - French troops begin the battle against the Viet Minh in Dien Bien Phu.
- March 23 - The Viet Minh capture the main airstrip of Dien Bien Phu. The remaining French Army units there are partially isolated.

=== May ===
- May 7 - The Battle of Dien Bien Phu ends in a French defeat.

=== July ===
- July 21 - The Geneva Conference sends French forces to the south, and Vietnamese forces to the north, of a ceasefire line, and calls for elections to decide the government for all of Vietnam by July 1956. Failure to abide by the terms of the agreement leads to the establishment de facto of regimes of North Vietnam and South Vietnam, and consequently the Vietnam War.

=== August ===
- August 1 - The First Indochina War ends with the Vietnam People's Army in North Vietnam, the Vietnamese National Army in South Vietnam, the Kingdom of Cambodia in Cambodia, and the Kingdom of Laos in Laos, emerging victorious against the French Army. French Indochina is now dissolved into said regions.
