= Royal Khmer Socialist Youth =

Youth organization in Cambodia

The Royal Khmer Socialist Youth (French: Jeunesse socialiste royale khmère, abbreviated JSRK; Khmer: កងយុវជនសង្គមនិយមខ្មែរ, romanized: kng youvochn sangkomniym khmer), also known as the Socialist Youth of the Khmer Kingdom, was a youth organization in Cambodia during the Cold War period. It was the youth wing of the ruling Sangkum party. JSRK was formed on the initiative of Prince Norodom Sihanouk, who became its chairman, and had over one million members.

== Launching and growth of JSRK ==
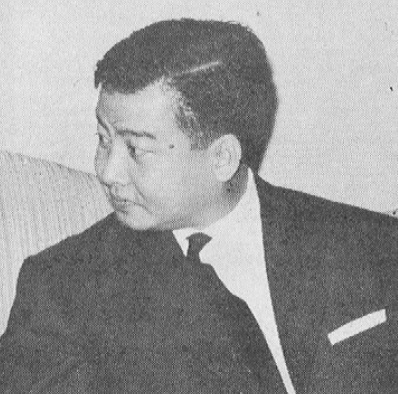
Norodom Sihanouk in 1959

The Royal Khmer Socialist Youth was founded on 5 September 1957. The organization was established by a government statute, as the youth organization within the frame of the ruling Sangkum party. The stated objective of JSRK was to mobilize youth in construction projects and foment national solidarity - inculcating Sangkum ideals of independence, neutrality, nationalism and loyalty to the throne. The JSRK was tasked to organize sport events, social welfare projects and paramilitary and civic trainings.

Whilst Prince Norodom Sihanouk served as the chairman of the JSRK, his mother Queen Sisowath Kossamak served as the sponsor of the organization. The JSRK chairman and ten officers defined the policy positions of JSRK. The executive leadership of the organization consisted of a committee director, assisted by a general commissariat. Initially JSRK was led by Mao Chhay, later Yim Dith took over the reins of JSRK. The financial matters of JSRK were managed by the Council of Ministers. JSRK branches were organized into teams, groups, companies and sectors.

On 25 April 1958, the first batch of JSRK cadres graduated from their training. Prince Sihanouk attached great importance to JSRK, in an April 1958 article he stated that "[t]he JSRK is our hope. It is its spirit and ideal of patriotism, sacrifice, work, and integrity which must prevail in parliament, in the administration, and in other vital sectors of the country." JSRK started to organize labour brigades at times, to be sent to rural areas to participate in different government construction projects.

In the face of political disturbances, Prince Sihanouk called for providing weapons and military training to the JSRK. In the run-up to the 1958 general election police and JSRK members harassed the leftist opposition Pracheachon, who were unable to hold election rallies.

Over time the JSRK would reach a point where it had more than one million members, being the largest youth organization in the country. JSRK members wore paramilitary-style uniforms, with closed-in shoes. JSRK songs were produced, with influence from North Korea. Boys in the JSRK were known as yuvans, girls as yuvanis. JSRK units were established in schools, propagating the ideals of Khmer socialism. But there were also many JSRK members were in their 30s and 40s, as civil servants were expected to be JSRK members.

== Ceremonial duties ==
A key function of JSRK members was to act as honour guards when Prince Sihanouk inaugurated different Sangkum projects. At official functions Prince Sihanouk would be accompanied by two JSRK members, one on each side. When foreign delegations visited Cambodia, uniformed JSRK members would be lined up along footpaths waving flags. JSRK delegations participated in regional and international sport and cultural events. JSRK had bilateral exchanges with Soviet youth organizations.

Per Marie Alexandrine Martin (1994) JSRK was more of a façade than a functional political organization. She quotes an unnamed former JSRK member, who argued that JSRK members were expected to participate in an annual three-day training, where they were taught to march and salute and being given lessons with vague messages instructing the attendees to love the monarchy and the country.

== JSRK and the intellectuals ==
Per journalist Ros Chantrabot, the function of the JSRK was "to indoctrinate intellectuals and watch over them". But leftist intellectuals were also present in the JSRK hierarchy, for example by 1967 prominent leftist Chau Seng (rector of the Buddhist University, Sangkum secretary) served as the JSRK secretary. Another prominent leftist - Phouk Chhay, the chairman of the Khmer General Students Association (AGEK) - served as deputy general commissioner of JSRK in the mid-1960s.

== Chinese model co-operative farm and the Samlaut uprising ==
On 17 July 1965, Phouk Chhay led a ten-member JSRK delegation to China. Upon his return Phouk Chhay briefed Prince Sihanouk on the 'part study, part work' system in China, which impressed the Prince. Ten days later the launch of a mixed Khmer-Chinese agricultural and pastoral venture at Stung Kranhoung (Samlaut District, close to the Thai border) was announced. Earth-moving equipment was sent to the border area to secure road to the new model farm. 80 youths and three agricultural advisers were sent to set up the JSRK farm. The initiative represented a double-edged policy of opening up access to remote frontier rural areas and sending city youth to develop the country-side.

But over time, dissent grew in the vicinity of the Chinese-model experimental JSRK farm. Villagers opposed government measures forcing them to sell rice to the government at a lower price than that offered by black market traders across the border. Per Ben Kiernan (1975) it is likely that villagers resented the JSRK farm, as many local families were forced to buy or make uniforms for the JSRK members at the farm. On 2 April 1967 rebels attacked and burnt down the JSRK farm at Stung Kranhoung, marking the beginning of the Cambodian Civil War. Per Kiernan the JRSK farm would have been the most obvious symbol of government presence in the area. Kiernan argued that "[i]t was ironic, and indicative of the gulf separating different groups on Kampuchea's left, that this JSRK co-operative, sponsored by Phouk Chhay, was to be the target of the first shorts fired in the civil war that began in 1967." The rebels also seized weapons from military posts and provincial guards. Prince Sihanouk ordered the uprising to be brutally suppressed, prompting villagers to side with the rebels. Eventually the rebels retreated into the forests accompanied by villagers and monks.

== Khmer Republic, Salvation Youth ==
After the establishment of the Khmer Republic on 11 April 1970, the JSRK was rebranded as the Salvation Youth (French: Jeunesse de sauvetage). The Salvation Youth would not play any major political role, its members took part in activities such as Combatants Day held on 6 January 1971, distributing gifts to soldiers, etc.
