= Election of the State Presidium of Democratic Kampuchea =

- Between 11 April and 13 April 1976

250 members of the Kampuchean People's Representative Assembly Unknown votes needed to win
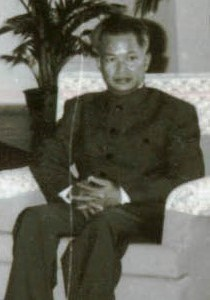
Candidate	Khieu Samphan
Party	CPK
Running mate	So Phim (first); Nhim Ros (second)
Electoral vote	Elected
President of the State Presidium before election
Vacant
President of the State Presidium
Khieu Samphan
CPK

Between 11 April and 13 April 1976, the members of the Kampuchean People's Representative Assembly elected the State Presidium (President, First Deputy President and Second Deputy President).

== Results ==
Khieu Samphan was elected as President of the State Presidium, So Phim was elected as First Deputy President of the State Presidium and Nhim Ros was elected as Second Deputy President of the State Presidium.
