= 1958 Cambodian electoral law referendum =

- 26 January 1958

Results
Choice	Votes	%
Yes	1,206,855	99.95%
No	545	0.05%
Valid votes	1,207,400	100.00%
Invalid or blank votes	0	0.00%
Total votes	1,207,400	100.00%

A referendum on changes to the electoral law was held in Cambodia on 26 January 1958. The changes would reduce the number of MPs from 91 to 61. It was approved by 99.9% of voters. Fresh elections under the new law took place in March.

== Results ==
Choice	Votes	%
For	1,206,855	99.9
Against	545	0.1
Invalid/blank votes		–
Total	1,207,400	100
Registered voters/turnout	1,911,770	
Source: Nohlen et al.
