= Ung (surname) =

Ung is a surname.

== Origin ==
Ung is a Latin-alphabet spelling of two Cambodian surnames, given below in Geographic Department romanization:

- Oeng (Khmer: អ៊ឹង; Khmer pronunciation: [ʔɨŋ]), which can be found among Chinese Cambodians as a Khmer-alphabet transcription of the Amoy Hokkien pronunciation of the Chinese surname Huáng (Chinese: 黃).
- Ung (Khmer: អ៊ុង; Khmer pronunciation: [ʔuŋ])

It is the Sino-Korean reading of the Chinese surname Xióng, though that surname is not found modern South Korea. It is also a Scandinavian surname literally meaning "young".

== Statistics ==
According to the 2010 United States census, roughly 4,519 people in the United States bore the surname Ung, with most (91.79%) being Asian Pacific Americans. As of 2017, 16 people in Denmark and 26 people in Norway bore the surname Ung.

== People ==
- Per Ung (1933–2013), Norwegian sculptor
- Chinary Ung (អ៊ុង ឈីណារី; born 1942), Cambodian composer
- Ung Huot (អ៊ឹង ហួត; born 1947), Prime Minister of Cambodia (1997–1998)
- Ung Hong Sath (អ៊ុង ហុងសាធ; fl. 1960s), Cambodian cabinet minister
- Loung Ung (អ៊ឹង លឿង; born 1970), Cambodian-born American human-rights activist and lecturer
- Sandra Ung (黃敏儀; born 1974), Cambodian-born American politician
- Daniel Ung (born 1975), Swedish football defender
