= Sihanoukism =

In Cambodian politics, Sihanoukism (Khmer: សីហនុនិយម, Seihânŭnĭyôm) refers to the political ideology of King Norodom Sihanouk. Sihanoukist political parties include the Sangkum Reastr Niyum, FUNCINPEC, and the most recent Community of Royalist People's Party. On 30 June 2006, in a letter to Sisowath Thomico, Sihanouk urged FUNCINPEC and other parties not to use in their writings or statements "Sihanoukism" and "Sihanoukist". The years between 1955 and 1966 got described as the "Golden years of Sihanoukism". Sihanoukism also influenced music.

== Sources ==
- Broadhurst, Roderic; Bouhours, Thierry; Bouhours, Brigitte (2015). "6 The golden years of Sihanoukism: 1955-1966". Violence and the Civilising Process in Cambodia. Cambridge: Cambridge University Press. pp. 149–165. doi:10.1017/CBO9781316271339. ISBN 978-1-107-10911-7.
