= Nguon Nhel =

Cambodian politician (1942–2021)

His Excellency Nguon Nhel MP
- ងួន ញ៉ិល

Member of Parliament for Kampong Thom
- In office 14 June 1993 – 5 November 2021
Other offices
First Vice President of the National Assembly
In office 6 September 2018 – 5 November 2021
President	Heng Samrin
Preceded by	You Hockry
Succeeded by	Cheam Yeab
In office 21 March 2006 – 26 August 2014
President	Heng Samrin
Preceded by	Heng Samrin
Succeeded by	Kem Sokha
Second Vice President of the National Assembly
In office 26 August 2014 – 6 September 2018
President	Heng Samrin
Preceded by	Khuon Sodary
Succeeded by	Khuon Sodary
In office 1997–2006
President	Norodom Ranariddh
Succeeded by	Say Chhum
Minister of Agriculture, Forestry and Fisheries
In office 1989–1993
Prime Minister	Hun Sen

Personal details
- Born: 22 December 1942 Baray, Kampong Thom, Cambodia, French Indochina
- Died: 5 November 2021 (aged 78) Phnom Penh, Cambodia
- Party: Cambodian People's Party
- Children: 6

Nguon Nhel (Khmer: ងួន ញ៉ិល; 22 December 1942 – 5 November 2021) was a Cambodian politician. He belonged to the Cambodian People's Party (CPP) and was a Member of Parliament (MP) for Kampong Thom from 1993 until his death. He was the Second Vice President of the National Assembly since 2014; he previously held that post from 1997 to 2006, and he was First Vice President of the National Assembly from 2006 to 2014. From 1989 to 1993, he was Minister for Agriculture, Forestry and Fisheries.

On 5 November 2021, Nhel died at the age of 78 due to illness.
