= Cheam Yeab =

Cambodian politician

Cheam Yeap MP
- ជាម យៀប

First Vice President of the National Assembly
- Incumbent
- Assumed office 25 November 2021
- President: Heng Samrin; Khuon Sodary
- Preceded by: Nguon Nhel

Member of Parliament for Prey Veng
- Incumbent
- Assumed office 14 June 1993

Chairman of the National Assembly Commission on Economics, Finance, Banking and Auditing
- Incumbent
- Assumed office 24 September 2013

Personal details
- Born: 22 October 1946 (age 79)
- Party: Cambodian People's Party

Cheam Yeap (Khmer: ជាម យៀប; born 22 October 1946) is a Cambodian politician. He belongs to the Cambodian People's Party and was elected to represent Prey Veng Province in the National Assembly of Cambodia in 2003.
