= Kingdom of Cambodia (1953–1970) =

Kingdom in Southeast Asia (1953–1970)

Kingdom of Cambodia ព្រះរាជាណាចក្រកម្ពុជា (Khmer) Preăh Réachéanachâkr Kâmpŭchéa Royaume du Cambodge (French) (1953–1970) State of Cambodia រដ្ឋកម្ពុជា (Khmer) Roăt Kâmpŭchéa État du Cambodge (French) (March–October 1970)
- 1953–1970
- Flag Royal arms
- Motto: ជាតិ សាសនា ព្រះមហាក្សត្រ: Chéatĕ, Sasânéa, Preăh Môhaksâtr; Nation, Religion, Roi; "Nation, Religion, King"
- Anthem: នគររាជ: Nôkôr Réach; Royaume majestueux; "Majestic Kingdom"
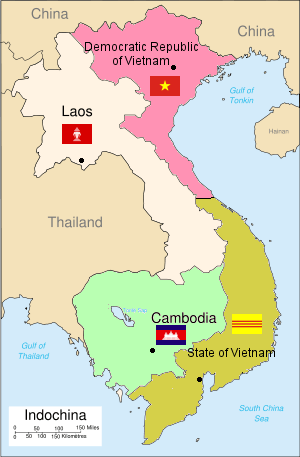
- Location of Cambodia (green) in Indochina

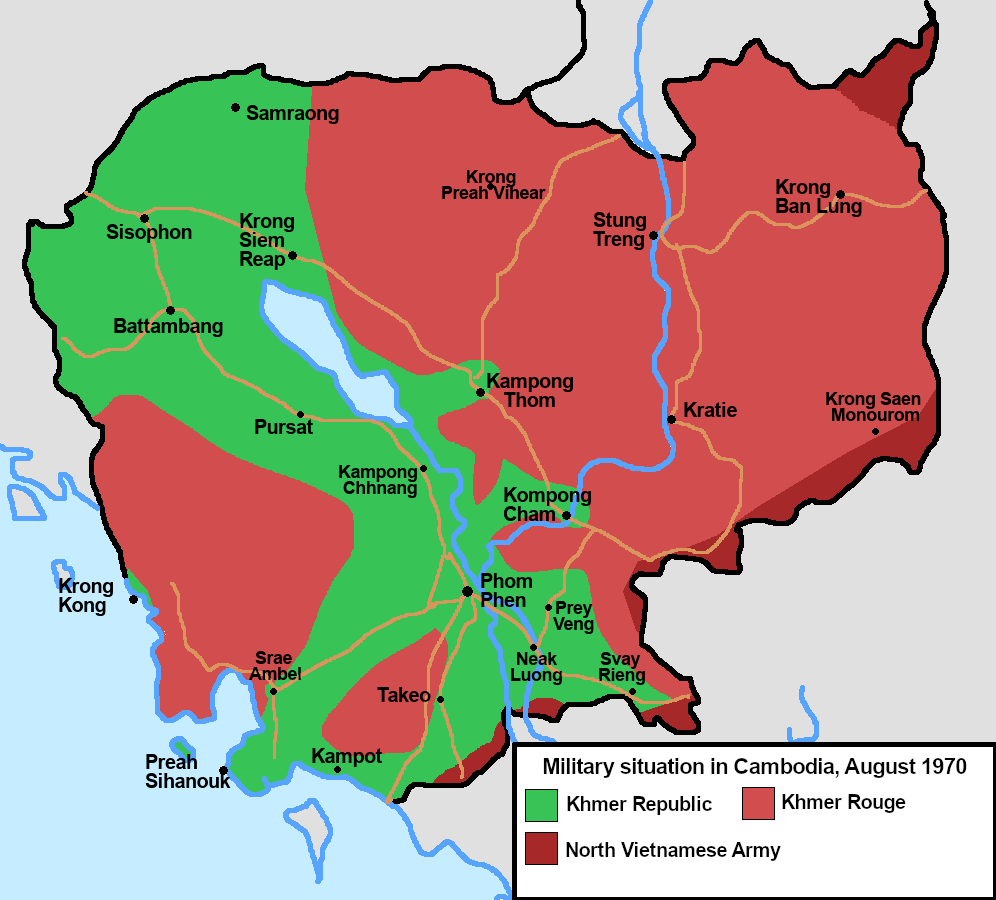
- Situation of the State in Cambodia in August 1970 (green)
- Capital and largest city: Phnom Penh
- Official languages: Khmer
- Recognised national languages: French
- Religion: Buddhism (official), Christianity, Islam, and other religions
- Demonyms: Cambodian; Khmer
- Government: Parliamentary monarchy: under a one-party authoritarian regime (1955–1970); under a transitional military dictatorship (March–October 1970)
- Monarch
  - 1953–1955 (first): Norodom Sihanouk
  - 1955–1960: Norodom Suramarit
  - 1960: Vacant
  - 1960: Sisowath Monireth (Note: As President of the Regency Council)
  - 1960: Vacant
  - 1960–1970 (last): Sisowath Kossamak (Note: After the death of Norodom Suramarit, Queen Sisowath Kossamak served as monarch for ceremonial purposes only, while the powers of head of state were delegated to her son Norodom Sihanouk who was known as the "Chief of State.")
- Chief of State
  - 1960: Chuop Hell (acting)
  - 1960: Vacant
  - 1960: Chuop Hell (acting)
  - 1960–1970: Norodom Sihanouk
  - 1970: Cheng Heng (acting)
- Prime Minister
  - 1953 (first): Penn Nouth
  - 1969–1970 (last): Lon Nol
- Legislature: Parliament
  - Upper house: Council of the Kingdom
  - Lower house: National Assembly
- Historical era: Cold War
  - Independence: 9 November 1953
  - Recognition: 21 July 1954
  - Sangkum era: 9 June 1955
  - Samlaut Uprising: 2 April 1967
  - Coup d'état: 18 March 1970
  - Khmer Republic: 9 October 1970

Population
  - 1962: 5,728,771
- Currency: Piastre (until 1955); Riel (៛) (KHR)
- Time zone: UTC+07:00 (ICT)
- Calling code: +855
Preceded by	Succeeded by
French Cambodia; French Indochina	Khmer Republic; GRUNK
- Today part of: Cambodia

The Kingdom of Cambodia, (Note: Khmer: ព្រះរាជាណាចក្រកម្ពុជា, UNGEGN: Preăh Réachéanachâkr Kâmpŭchéa, ALA-LC: Braḥ Rājāṇācakr Kambujā, [preah riəciənaːcak kampuciə]; French: Royaume du Cambodge) also known as the First Kingdom of Cambodia, (Note: Khmer: ព្រះរាជាណាចក្រកម្ពុជាទី១, UNGEGN: Preăh Réachéanachâkr Kâmpŭchéa ti 1, ALA-LC: Braḥ Rājāṇācakr Kambujā dī 1, [preah riəciənaːcak kampuciə tiː muəj]; French: Premier royaume du Cambodge) and commonly referred to as the Sangkum period, (Note: Khmer: សម័យសង្គមរាស្ត្រនិយម, UNGEGN: Sâmoăy Sângkôm Réastrônĭyôm, ALA-LC: Samăy Sanggam Rāstraniyam, [samaj sɑŋkum riəhnijum]; lit. 'Sangkum Reastr Niyum period' or 'Popular Socialist Community period'; French: Période de la communauté socialiste populaire) refers to Norodom Sihanouk's first administration of Cambodia, lasting from the country's independence from France in 1953 to a military coup d'état in 1970. Sihanouk continues to be one of the most controversial figures in Southeast Asia's turbulent and often tragic postwar history. From 1955 until 1970, Sihanouk's Sangkum was the sole legal party in Cambodia. After the 1970 coup, the semi-official name of Cambodia was State of Cambodia, it became a transitional government under a military dictatorship of Prime Minister Lon Nol against the Khmer Rouge led by Saloth Sâr ("Pol Pot") and the North Vietnamese or simply the Việt Cộng under the legacy of Ho Chi Minh’s Indochinese communist doctrine.

Following the end of World War II, France restored its colonial control over Indochina but faced local resistance against their rule, particularly from Communist guerilla forces. On 9 November 1953, Cambodia achieved independence from France under Norodom Sihanouk but still faced resistance from Communist groups such as United Issarak Front. As the Vietnam War escalated, Cambodia sought to retain its neutrality but in 1965, North Vietnamese soldiers were allowed to set up bases and in 1969, the United States began a bombing campaign against North Vietnamese soldiers in Cambodia. The Cambodian monarchy was abolished in a coup on 9 October 1970, headed by Prime Minister Lon Nol, who established the Khmer Republic which lasted until the Fall of Phnom Penh to Angkar Padevat ("The Revolutionary Organization") when it came to power on 17 April 1975 as the beginning of Year Zero, starting with anti-urbanism.

== Geneva Conference and Viet Minh incursion ==
Although Cambodia had achieved independence by late 1953, its military situation remained unsettled. Noncommunist factions of the Khmer Issarak had joined the government, but pro-communist Viet Minh and United Issarak Front activities increased at the very time French Union forces were stretched thin elsewhere. In April 1954, several Viet Minh battalions crossed the border into Cambodia. Royalist forces engaged them but could not force their complete withdrawal. In part, the communists were attempting to strengthen their bargaining position at the Geneva Conference that had been scheduled to begin in late April.

The Geneva Conference was attended by representatives of Cambodia, North Vietnam, the Associated State of Vietnam (the predecessor of the Republic of Vietnam or South Vietnam), Kingdom of Laos, the People's Republic of China, the Soviet Union, Britain, France and the United States. One goal of the conference was to restore a lasting peace in Indochina. The discussions on Indochina began on May 8, 1954. The North Vietnamese attempted to get representation for the resistance government that had been established in the south, but failed.

On July 21, 1954, the conference reached an agreement calling for a cessation of hostilities in Indochina. With respect to Cambodia, the agreement stipulated that all Viet Minh military forces be withdrawn within ninety days and that Cambodian resistance forces be demobilized within thirty days. In a separate agreement signed by the Cambodian representative, the French and the Viet Minh agreed to withdraw all forces from Cambodian soil by October 1954.

In exchange for the withdrawal of Viet Minh forces, the communist representatives in Geneva wanted full neutrality for Cambodia and for Laos that would prevent the basing of the United States Armed Forces in these countries. On the eve of the conference's conclusion, however, the Cambodian representative, Sam Sary, insisted that, if Cambodia were to be genuinely independent, it must not be prohibited from seeking whatever military assistance it desired (Cambodia had earlier appealed to the U.S. for military aid). The conference accepted this point over North Vietnam's strenuous objections. In the final agreement, Cambodia accepted a watered-down neutrality, vowing not to join any military alliance "not in conformity with the principles of the Charter of the United Nations" or to allow the basing of foreign military forces on its territory "as long as its security is not threatened."

The conference agreement established the International Control Commission (officially called the International Commission for Supervision and Control) in all the Indochinese countries. Made up of representatives from Canada, India and Poland, it supervised the cease-fire, the withdrawal of foreign troops, the release of prisoners of war and overall compliance with the terms of the agreement. The French and most of the Viet Minh forces were withdrawn on schedule in October 1954.

== Domestic developments ==
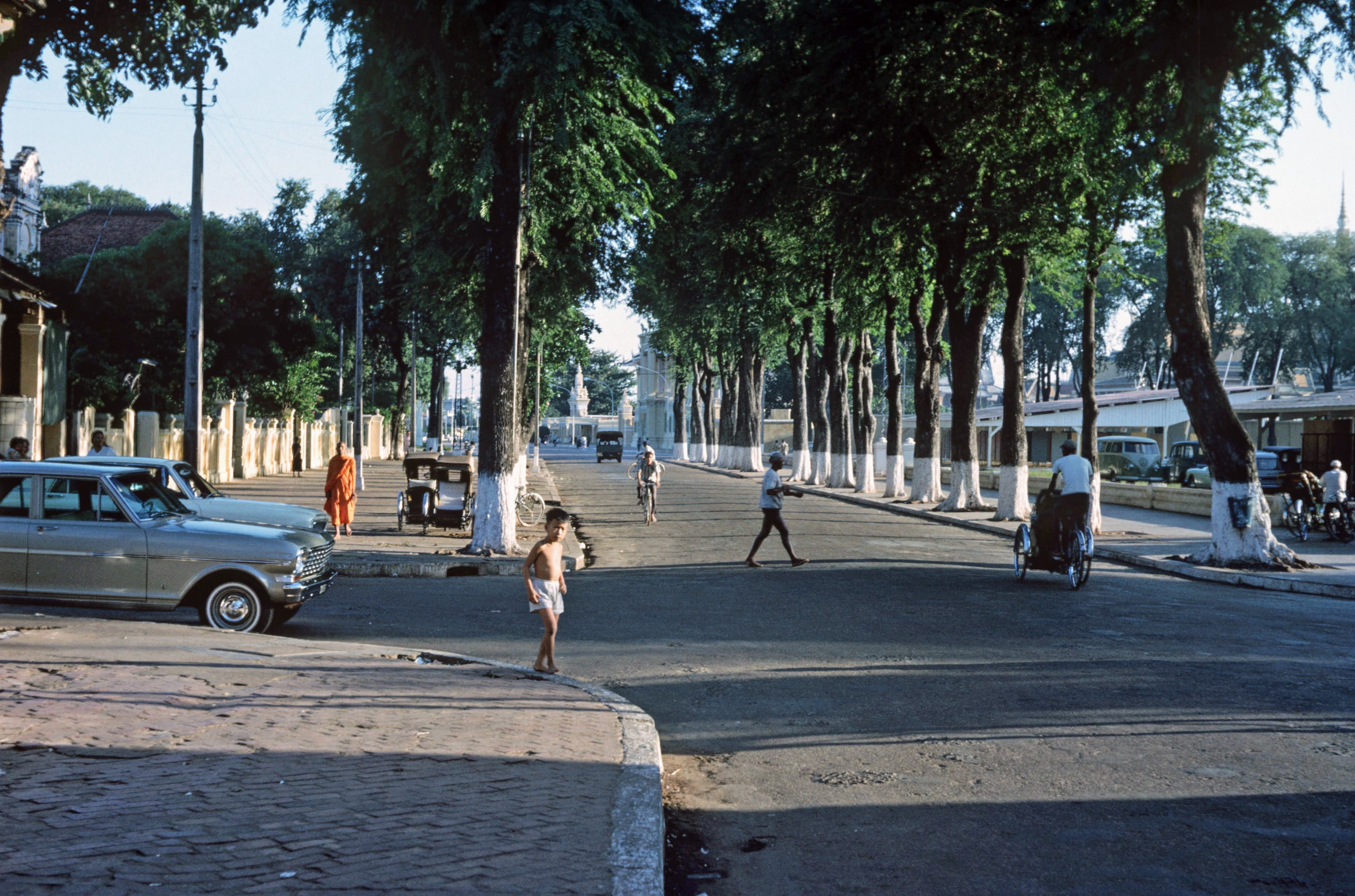
Phnom Penh in 1964.

The Geneva agreement also stipulated that general elections should be held in Cambodia during 1955 and that the International Control Commission should monitor them to ensure fairness. Sihanouk was more determined than ever to defeat the Democrats (who, on the basis of their past record, were expected to win the election). The king attempted unsuccessfully to have the constitution amended. On March 2, 1955, he announced his abdication in favor of his father, Norodom Suramarit. Assuming the title of Samdech (meaning "Lord" but in this context "Prince"), Sihanouk explained that this action was necessary in order to give him a free hand to engage in politics.

To challenge the Democrats, Prince Sihanouk established his own political machine, the Sangkum Reastr Niyum (Popular Socialist Community), commonly referred to as the Sangkum, which, despite its name, contained significant right-wing elements that were virulently anticommunist. The Sangkum's emergence in early 1955 unified most right-wing groups under the prince's auspices. In the September election, Sihanouk's new party decisively defeated the Democrats, the Khmer Independence Party of Son Ngoc Thanh, and the leftist Pracheachon Party, winning 83% of the vote and all of the seats in the National Assembly.

The results of the 1955 general election have been attributed to fraud and intimidation. Voters were intimidated by a voting system involving colored pieces of paper that had to be put into a box in full view of Sihanouk's political figures, soldiers and local police. In many cases, voting results were simply falsified as in the case where a district that had been a Viet Minh stronghold for years did not return a single vote for the far left. Writer Philip Short points to a 1957 statement by Sihanouk admitting that thirty six electoral districts had voted Pracheachon or Democrat majority whereas the official results said that they had won none.

Khmer nationalism, loyalty to the monarch, struggle against injustice and corruption, and protection of the Buddhist religion were major themes in Sangkum ideology. The party adopted a particularly conservative interpretation of Buddhism, common in the Theravada countries of Southeast Asia, that the social and economic inequalities among people were legitimate because of the workings of karma. For the poorer classes, virtuous and obedient conduct opened up the possibility of being born into a higher station in a future life.

In August 1957, Sihanouk summoned the leaders of the Democratic Party to what he called a "debate" at the Royal Palace. They were subjected to five hours of public humiliation. After the event was over, the participants were dragged from their cars and beaten with rifle butts by Sihanouk's police and army.

Around the same time, the Pracheachon party put up five candidates for election. Sihanouk travelled in person to each district and the government mounted a full campaign against the party. The national radio service accused the party of being Vietnamese puppets. Posters showing supposed atrocities were hung in the districts. Eventually four candidates were intimidated into dropping out of the election. The only one who stayed in was credited by government officials with 396 votes out of an electorate of 30,000 in an area where Pracheachon was known to have deep support.

As the 1960s began, organized political opposition to Sihanouk and the Sangkum virtually had been largely driven underground. According to Vickery, the Democratic Party disbanded in 1957 after its leaders—who had been beaten by soldiers—requested the privilege of joining the Sangkum.

Despite its defense of the status quo, especially the interests of rural elites, the Sangkum was not exclusively a right-wing organization. Sihanouk invited a number of leftists into his party and government to provide a balance to the right-wing. Among these were future leaders of the Khmer Rouge. Hu Nim and Hou Yuon served in several ministries between 1958 and 1963, and Khieu Samphan served briefly as secretary of state for commerce in 1963.

But the independent parties of the left were generally targeted for destruction. On October 9, 1959, the editor of the Pracheachon Weekly Paper, Nop Bophann was shot to death outside his office by state security police. In 1960, some 2,000 people were detained for political reasons in a holding camp outside the capital. State Security cases were handled by a military tribunal from which there was no appeal. The tribunal handed down over 39 death decrees in its first six months of operation and it was widely known that the verdicts were the personal decision of Sihanouk.

In 1960, the editor of the paper l'Observateur was beaten in the street, stripped naked and photographed by members of the security police a few hundred yards from the Central Police Station. The editor reported the attack to the police. When the National Assembly summoned the minister responsible to explain the incident, he said it was the job of the police to protect the opponents of the government. The minister then proceeded to name members of the National Assembly who he considered to be in the same category of opponents.

One of the named deputies, Uch Ven, tabled a censure motion that had been drawn up against the minister. Sihanouk issued a statement afterward attacking the members of the National Assembly for their hostile attitude toward the police. Within days, l'Observateur and two other papers were closed by the government, 50 people were detained indefinitely for questioning and the political director of Sihanouk's own newspaper was fired for an editorial objecting to heavy-handed political intimidation.

In July 1962, one of the leading leftists in the country, Tou Samouth was grabbed by the security police while seeking medicine for his child in a street market. He was held in secret and tortured for several days. He was eventually murdered, and his body was dumped into a wasteland in the Stung Meancheay district of Phnom Penh.

In March 1963, Sihanouk published a list of 34 leftists. After denouncing them as cowards, hypocrites, saboteurs, subversive agents and traitors, he demanded that they form a government for the country. Shortly after, they were brought into the presence of Sihanouk and each signed a statement saying that he was the only man capable of leading the country. After the incident, police officers were posted outside the residences and places of employment of each of the named men. They were essentially under permanent police observation.

The results of 1962 and 1963 were to drive the underground leftist movement out of the cities and into the countryside. Even underground politics or proxy actions through above-ground parties against the government had effectively ceased to be possible.

Sihanouk's attitude toward the left was often cynical. He realized that his own political position was dependent on carefully balancing off the left in Cambodia against the right. If one side ever defeated the other, the next step of either party would be to end Sihanouk's role in ruling the country. He often declared that if he had not been a prince, he would have become a revolutionary.

Sihanouk's chronic suspicion of United States intentions in the region, his perception of revolutionary China as Cambodia's most valuable ally, his respect for such prominent and capable leftists as Hou, Hu, and Khieu, and his vague notions of "royal socialism" all impelled him to experiment with socialist policies. It should also be recognized that each move toward socialism gave Sihanouk and his inner circle the ability to reward each other with lucrative political "spoils" and patronage. In 1963 the prince announced the nationalization of banking, foreign trade, and insurance as a means of reducing foreign control of the economy. In 1964 a state trading company, the National Export-Import Corporation, was established to handle foreign commerce.

The declared purposes of nationalization were to give Khmer nationals, rather than Chinese or Vietnamese, a greater role in the nation's trade, to eliminate middlemen and to conserve foreign exchange through the limiting of unnecessary luxury imports. As a result of this policy, foreign investment quickly disappeared, and a nepotistic "crony socialism" emerged somewhat similar to the "crony capitalism" that evolved in the Philippines under President Ferdinand Marcos. Lucrative state monopolies were parceled out to Sihanouk's most loyal retainers, who "milked" them for cash.

Sihanouk was headed steadily for a collision with the right. To counter charges of one-man rule, the prince declared that he would relinquish control of candidate selection and would permit more than one Sangkum candidate to run for each seat in the September 1966 National Assembly election. The returns showed a surprising upsurge in the conservative vote at the expense of more moderate and left-wing elements, although Hou, Hu, and Khieu were reelected by their constituencies. General Lon Nol became prime minister.

Out of concern that the right wing might cause an irreparable split within the Sangkum and might challenge his domination of the political system, Sihanouk set up a "counter government" (like the British "shadow cabinet") packed with his most loyal personal followers and with leading leftists, hoping that it would exert a restraining influence on Lon Nol. Leftists accused the general of being groomed by Western intelligence agencies to lead a bloody anticommunist coup d'état similar to that of General Suharto in Indonesia. Injured in an automobile accident, Lon Nol resigned in April 1967. Sihanouk replaced him with a trusted centrist, Son Sann. This was the twenty-third successive Sangkum cabinet and government to have been appointed by Sihanouk since the party was formed in 1955.

== Nonaligned foreign policy ==
Sihanouk's non-aligned foreign policy, which emerged in the months following the Geneva Conference, cannot be understood without reference to Cambodia's history of foreign subjugation and its very uncertain prospects for survival as the war between North Vietnam and South Vietnam intensified. Soon after the 1954 Geneva Conference, Sihanouk expressed some interest in integrating Cambodia into the framework of the Southeast Asia Treaty Organization (SEATO), which included Cambodia, Laos, and South Vietnam within the "treaty area", although none of these states was a signatory. But meetings in late 1954 with India's Prime Minister Jawaharlal Nehru and Burma's Premier U Nu made him receptive to the appeal of nonalignment. Moreover, the prince was somewhat uneasy about a United States-dominated alliance that included one old enemy, Thailand, and encompassed another, South Vietnam, each of which offered sanctuary to anti-Sihanouk dissidents.

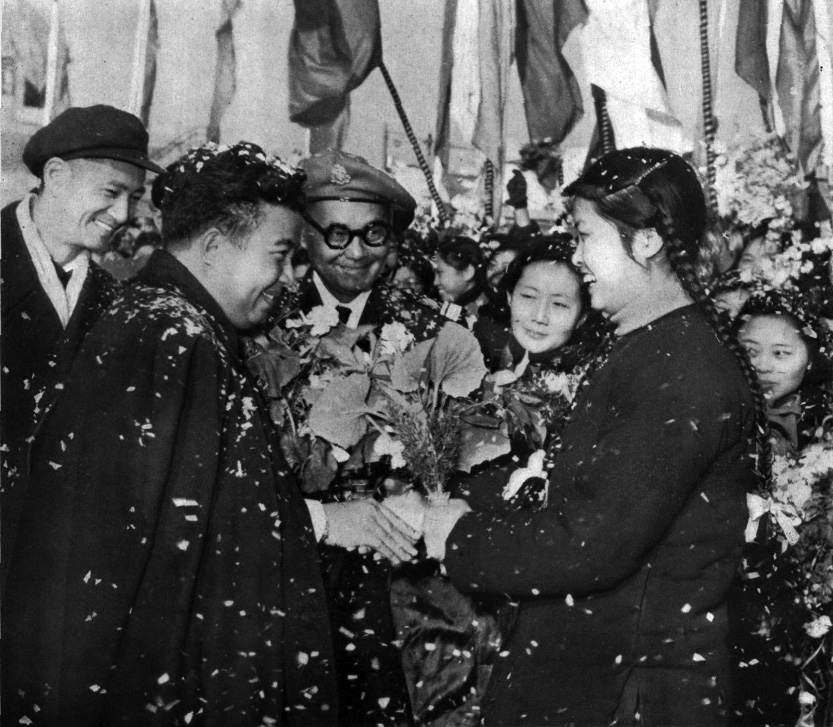
A welcoming ceremony for Sihanouk in China, 1956

At the Bandung Conference in April 1955, Sihanouk held private meetings with Premier Zhou Enlai of China and Foreign Minister Phạm Văn Đồng of North Vietnam. Both assured him that their countries would respect Cambodia's independence and territorial integrity. His experience with the French, first as a client, then as the self-proclaimed leader of the "royal crusade for independence", apparently led him to conclude that the United States, like France, would eventually be forced to leave Southeast Asia.

From this perspective, the Western presence in Indochina was only a temporary interruption of the dynamics of the region—continued Vietnamese (and perhaps even Thai) expansion at Cambodia's expense. Accommodation with North Vietnam and friendly ties with China during the late 1950s and the 1960s were tactics designed to counteract these dynamics. China accepted Sihanouk's overtures and became a valuable counterweight to growing Vietnamese and Thai pressure on Cambodia.

Cambodia's relations with China were based on mutual interests. Sihanouk hoped that China would restrain the Vietnamese and the Thai from acting to Cambodia's detriment. The Chinese, in turn, viewed Cambodia's nonalignment as vital in order to prevent the encirclement of their country by the United States and its allies. When Premier Zhou Enlai visited Phnom Penh in 1956, he asked the country's Chinese minority, numbering about 300,000, to cooperate in Cambodia's development, to stay out of politics, and to consider adopting Cambodian citizenship.

This gesture helped to resolve a sensitive issue—the loyalty of Cambodian Chinese—that had troubled the relationship between Phnom Penh and Beijing. In 1960 the two countries signed a Treaty of Friendship and Nonaggression. After the Sino-Soviet rift Sihanouk's ardent friendship with China contributed to generally cooler ties with Moscow.

China was not the only large power to which Sihanouk looked for patronage. Cambodia's quest for security and nation-building assistance impelled the prince to search beyond Asia and to accept help from all donors as long as there was no impingement upon his country's sovereignty. With this end in mind, Sihanouk turned to the United States in 1955 and negotiated a military aid agreement that secured funds and equipment for the Royal Khmer Armed Forces (Forces Armées Royales Khmères—FARK). A United States Military Assistance Advisory Group (MAAG) was established in Phnom Penh to supervise the delivery and the use of equipment that began to arrive from the United States. By the early 1960s, aid from Washington constituted 30% of Cambodia's defense budget and 14% of total budget inflows (First Indochina War).

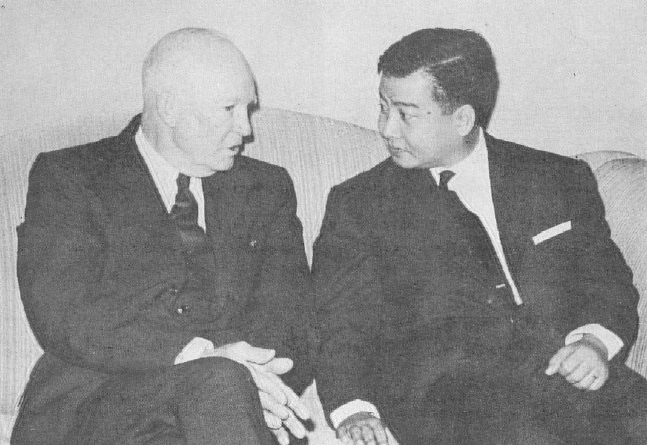
Eisenhower and Sihanouk in 1959

Relations with the United States proved to be stormy. United States officials both in Washington and in Phnom Penh frequently underestimated the prince and considered him to be an erratic figure with minimal understanding of the threat posed by Asian communism. Sihanouk easily reciprocated this mistrust because several developments aroused his suspicion of United States intentions toward his country.

One of these developments was the growing United States influence within the Cambodian armed forces. The processing of equipment deliveries and the training of Cambodian personnel had forged close ties between United States military advisers and their Cambodian counterparts. Military officers of both nations also shared apprehensions about the spread of communism in Southeast Asia. Sihanouk considered FARK to be Washington's most powerful constituency in his country. The prince also feared that a number of high-ranking, rightist FARK officers led by Lon Nol were becoming too powerful and that, by association with these officers, United States influence in Cambodia was becoming too deeply rooted.

A second development included the repetition of overflights by United States and South Vietnamese military aircraft within Cambodian airspace and border incursions by South Vietnamese troops in hot pursuit of Viet Cong insurgents who crossed into Cambodian territory when military pressure upon them became too sustained. As the early 1960s wore on, this increasingly sensitive issue contributed to the deterioration of relations between Phnom Penh and Washington.

A third development was Sihanouk's own belief that he had been targeted by United States intelligence agencies for replacement by a more pro-Western leader. Evidence to support this suspicion came to light in 1959 when the government discovered a plot to overthrow Sihanouk. The conspiracy, often known as the "Bangkok Plot", involved several Khmer leaders suspected of American connections. Among them were Sam Sary, a leader of right-wing Khmer Serei troops in South Vietnam; Son Ngoc Thanh, the early nationalist leader once exiled into Thailand; and Dap Chhuon, the military governor of Siem Reap Province. Another alleged plot involved Dap Chuon's establishment of a "free" state that would have included Siem Reap Province and Kampong Thum (Kampong Thom) Province and the southern areas of Laos that were controlled by the rightist Laotian prince, Boun Oum.

These developments, magnified by Sihanouk's abiding suspicions, eventually undermined Phnom Penh's relations with Washington. In November 1963, the prince charged that the United States was continuing to support the subversive activities of the Khmer Serei in Thailand and in South Vietnam, and he announced the immediate termination of Washington's aid program to Cambodia. Relations continued to deteriorate, and the final break came in May 1965 amid increasing indications of airspace violations by South Vietnamese and by United States aircraft and of ground fighting between Army of the Republic of Vietnam (ARVN) troops and Viet Cong insurgents in the Cambodian border areas.

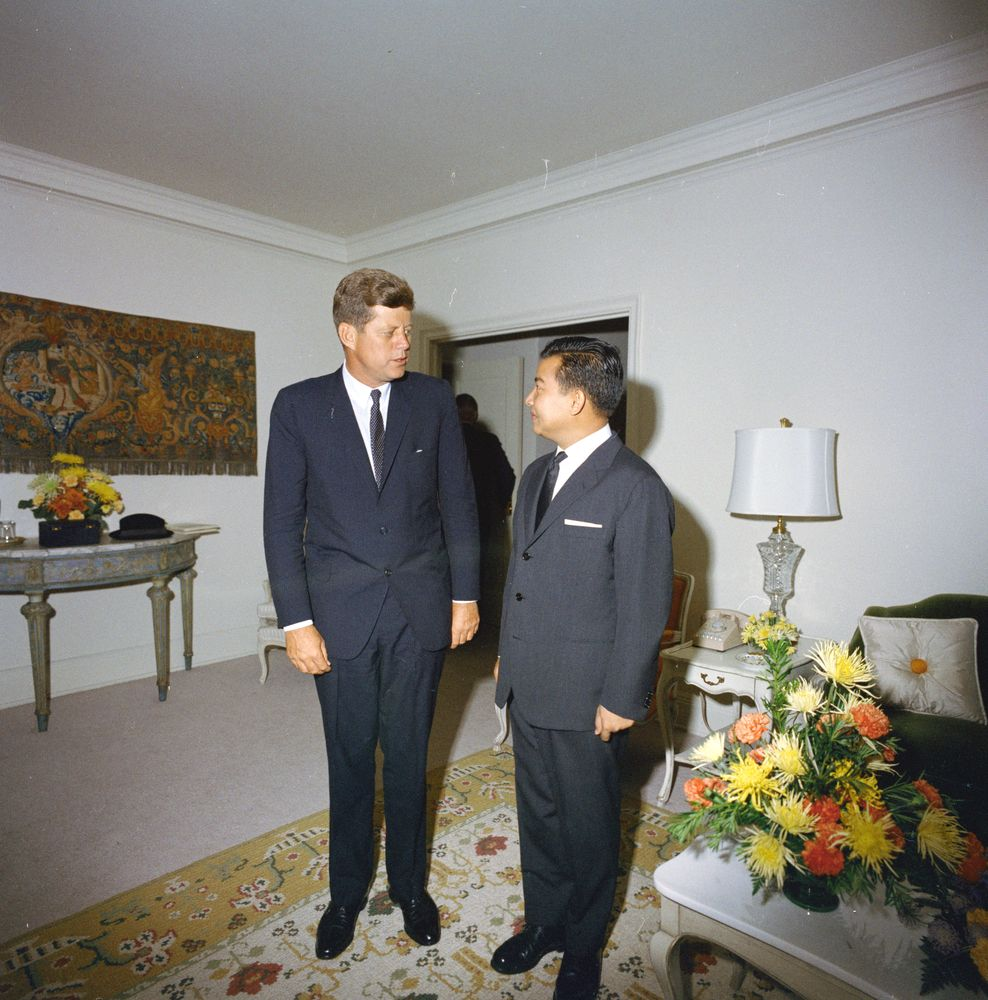
John F. Kennedy and Prince Sihanouk in New York, 1961

In the meantime, Cambodia's relations with North Vietnam and with South Vietnam, as well as the rupture with Washington, reflected Sihanouk's efforts to adjust to geopolitical realities in Southeast Asia and to keep his country out of the escalating war in neighboring South Vietnam. In the early-to-mid-1960s, this effort required a tilt toward Hanoi because the government in Saigon tottered on the brink of anarchy. In the cities, the administration of Ngo Dinh Diem and the military regimes that succeeded it had become increasingly ineffectual and unstable, while in the countryside the government forces were steadily losing ground to the Hanoi-backed insurgents.

To observers in Phnom Penh, South Vietnam's short-term viability was seriously in doubt, and this compelled a new tack in Cambodian foreign policy. First, Cambodia severed diplomatic ties with Saigon in August 1963. The following March, Sihanouk announced plans to establish diplomatic relations with North Vietnam and to negotiate a border settlement directly with Hanoi. These plans were not implemented quickly, however, because the North Vietnamese told the prince that any problem concerning Cambodia's border with South Vietnam would have to be negotiated directly with the National Front for the Liberation of South Vietnam (NFLSVN).

Cambodia opened border talks with the front in mid-1966, and the latter recognized the inviolability of Cambodia's borders a year later. North Vietnam quickly followed suit. Cambodia was the first foreign government to recognize the NFLSVN's Provisional Revolutionary Government after it was established in June 1969. Sihanouk was the only foreign head of state to attend the funeral of Ho Chi Minh, North Vietnam's deceased leader, in Hanoi three months later.

In 1965, Sihanouk negotiated a deal with China and North Vietnam. Whereas before Viet Cong and North Vietnamese forces had temporarily moved into Cambodian territory, the deal allowed them to build permanent military facilities on Cambodian soil. Cambodia also opened its ports to shipments of military supplies from China and the Soviet Union to the Vietnamese. In exchange for these concessions, large amounts of money passed into the hands of the Cambodian elite. In particular, deals were made where China would purchase rice at inflated prices from the Cambodian government. While Sihanouk talked neutrality in public, he had effectively pushed Cambodia directly into the Vietnam War.

After making friends with North Vietnam and China, Sihanouk turned politically to the right and unleashed a wave of repression throughout the country. The repression drove most of the political left in the country underground. While Sihanouk's deal with China and Vietnam in the short term kept both countries from arming the Cambodian left, it did not prevent the Cambodian left from launching an unsupported rebellion on its own.

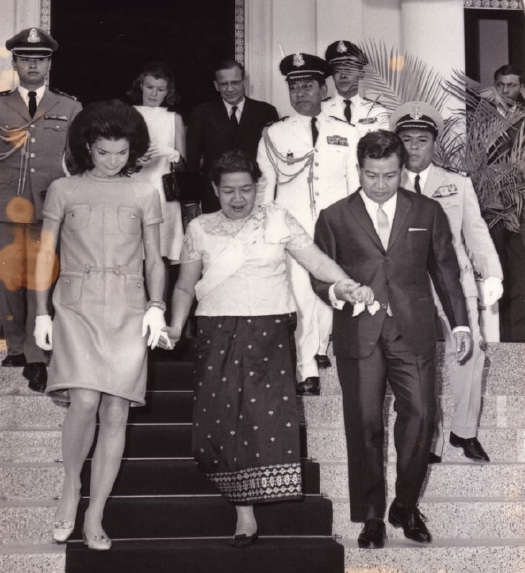
Jacqueline Kennedy, Sisowath Kossamak, and Norodom Sihanouk in 1967.

In the late 1960s, while preserving relations with China and with North Vietnam, Sihanouk sought to restore a measure of equilibrium by improving Cambodia's ties with the West. This shift in course by the prince represented another adjustment to prevailing conditions in Asia. The Cultural Revolution had made the Chinese very difficult with which to carry on relations. The increasing North Vietnamese presence in Eastern Cambodia was destabilizing Cambodia politically and economically.

When the Cambodian left went underground in the late 1960s, Sihanouk made concessions to the right since he did not have any force that he could play against them. Cambodia served as the southern terminus of the Ho Chi Minh Trail, the logistical resupply route of the North Vietnamese and Viet Cong. The use by these forces of sanctuaries in Cambodia put Cambodian neutrality in jeopardy. China, preoccupied with its Cultural Revolution, did not intercede with Hanoi. On Cambodia's eastern border, even in the face of the communist Tet Offensive in 1968, South Vietnam surprisingly had not collapsed and President Nguyễn Văn Thiệu's government was bringing a measure of stability to that war-ravaged country.

As the government in Phnom Penh began to feel keenly the loss of economic and military aid from the United States, which had totaled about US$400 million between 1955 and 1963, it began to have second thoughts about the break with Washington. The unavailability of American equipment and spare parts were exacerbated by the small amount and poor quality of Soviet, Chinese, and French substitutes.

In late 1967 and in early 1968, Sihanouk signaled that he would raise no objection to hot pursuit of communist forces by South Vietnamese or by United States troops into Cambodian territory. Washington, in the meantime, accepted the recommendation of the United States Military Assistance Command--Vietnam (MACV) and, beginning in March 1969, ordered a series of airstrikes (dubbed the Menu series) against Cambodian sanctuaries used by the North Vietnamese and the Viet Cong.

Whether or not these bombing missions were authorized aroused considerable controversy, and assertions by the Nixon administration that Sihanouk had "allowed" or even "encouraged" them were disputed by critics such as British journalist William Shawcross. But in retrospect, Sihanouk allowing US bombing as a counter-weight to his previous decision to allow the Vietnamese to establish base areas seems consistent with his policy strategy in that US was the only force he could use as a counter-weight to the Vietnamese presence in Cambodia.

On a diplomatic level, however, the Menu airstrikes did not impede bilateral relations from moving forward. In April 1969, Nixon sent a note to the prince affirming that the United States recognized and respected "the sovereignty, neutrality and territorial integrity of the Kingdom of Cambodia with its present frontiers." Shortly thereafter, in June 1969, full diplomatic relations were restored between Phnom Penh and Washington.

== Early phases of the Cambodian Left ==
The history of the communist movement in Cambodia can be divided into six phases: the emergence of the Indochinese Communist Party (ICP), whose members were almost exclusively Vietnamese, before World War II; the ten-year struggle for independence from the French, when a separate Cambodian communist party, the Kampuchean (or Khmer) People's Revolutionary Party (KPRP), was established under Vietnamese auspices; the period following the Second Party Congress of the KPRP in 1960, when Saloth Sar (Pol Pot after 1976) and other future Khmer Rouge leaders gained control of its apparatus; the revolutionary struggle from the initiation of the Khmer Rouge insurgency in 1967–68 to the fall of the Lon Nol government in April 1975; the Democratic Kampuchea regime, from April 1975 to January 1979; and the period following the Third Party Congress of the KPRP in January 1979, when Hanoi effectively assumed control over Cambodia's government and communist party.

Much of the movement's history has been shrouded in mystery, largely because successive purges, especially during the Democratic Kampuchea period, have left so few survivors to recount their experiences. One thing is evident, however, the tension between Khmer and Vietnamese was a major theme in the movement's development. In the three decades between the end of World War II and the Khmer Rouge victory, the appeal of communism to Western educated intellectuals (and to a lesser extent its more inchoate attraction for poor peasants) was tempered by the apprehension that the much stronger Vietnamese movement was using communism as an ideological rationale for dominating the Khmer.

The analogy between the Vietnamese communists and the Nguyễn dynasty, which had legitimized its encroachments in the 19th century in terms of the "civilizing mission" of Confucianism, was persuasive. Thus, the new brand of indigenous communism that emerged after 1960 combined nationalist and revolutionary appeals and, when it could afford to, exploited the virulent anti-Vietnamese sentiments of the Khmers. Khmer Rouge literature in the 1970s frequently referred to the Vietnamese as yuon (barbarian), a term dating from the Angkorian period.

In 1930 Ho Chi Minh founded the Vietnamese Communist Party by unifying three smaller communist movements that had emerged in Tonkin, in Annam, and in Cochinchina during the late 1920s. The name was changed almost immediately to the ICP, ostensibly to include revolutionaries from Cambodia and Laos. Almost without exception, however, all the earliest party members were Vietnamese. By the end of World War II, a handful of Cambodians had joined its ranks, but their influence on the Indochinese communist movement and on developments within Cambodia was negligible.

Viet Minh units occasionally made forays into Cambodian bases during their war against the French, and, in conjunction with the leftist government that ruled Thailand until 1947, the Viet Minh encouraged the formation of armed, left-wing Khmer Issarak bands. On April 17, 1950 (twenty-five years to the day before the Khmer Rouge captured Phnom Penh), the first nationwide congress of the Khmer Issarak groups convened, and the United Issarak Front was established. Its leader was Son Ngoc Minh (possibly a brother of the nationalist Son Ngoc Thanh), and a third of its leadership consisted of members of the ICP. According to the historian David P. Chandler, the leftist Issarak groups, aided by the Viet Minh, occupied a sixth of Cambodia's territory by 1952; and, on the eve of the Geneva Conference, they controlled as much as one half of the country.

In 1951 the ICP was reorganized into three national units—the Vietnam Workers' Party, the Lao Itsala, and the KPRP. According to a document issued after the reorganization, the Vietnam Workers' Party would continue to "supervise" the smaller Laotian and Cambodian movements. Most KPRP leaders and rank-and-file seem to have been either Khmer Krom, or ethnic Vietnamese living in Cambodia. The party's appeal to indigenous Khmers appears to have been minimal.

According to Democratic Kampuchea's version of party history, the Viet Minh's failure to negotiate a political role for the KPRP at the 1954 Geneva Conference represented a betrayal of the Cambodian movement, which still controlled large areas of the countryside and which commanded at least 5,000 armed men. Following the conference, about 1,000 members of the KPRP, including Son Ngoc Minh, made a "Long March" into North Vietnam, where they remained in exile. In late 1954, those who stayed in Cambodia founded a legal political party, the Pracheachon Party, which participated in the 1955 and the 1958 National Assembly elections.

In the September 1955 election, it won about 4% of the vote but did not secure a seat in the legislature. Members of the Pracheachon were subject to constant harassment and to arrests because the party remained outside Sihanouk's Sangkum. Government attacks prevented it from participating in the 1962 election and drove it underground. Sihanouk habitually labeled local leftists the Khmer Rouge, a term that later came to signify the party and the state headed by Pol Pot, Ieng Sary, Khieu Samphan, and their associates.

During the mid-1950s, KPRP factions, the "urban committee" (headed by Tou Samouth), and the "rural committee" (headed by Sieu Heng), emerged. In very general terms, these groups espoused divergent revolutionary lines. The prevalent "urban" line, endorsed by North Vietnam, recognized that Sihanouk, by virtue of his success in winning independence from the French, was a genuine national leader whose neutralism and deep distrust of the United States made him a valuable asset in Hanoi's struggle to "liberate" South Vietnam.

Champions of this line hoped that the prince could be persuaded to distance himself from the right wing and to adopt leftist policies. The other line, supported for the most part by rural cadres who were familiar with the harsh realities of the countryside, advocated an immediate struggle to overthrow the "feudalist" Sihanouk. In 1959 Sieu Heng defected to the government and provided the security forces with information that enabled them to destroy as much as 90% of the party's rural apparatus. Although communist networks in Phnom Penh and in other towns under Tou Samouth's jurisdiction fared better, only a few hundred communists remained active in the country by 1960.

== Paris Student Group ==
During the 1950s, Khmer students in Paris organized their own communist movement, which had little, if any, connection to the hard-pressed party in their homeland. From their ranks came the men and women who returned home and took command of the party apparatus during the 1960s, led an effective insurgency against Sihanouk and Lon Nol from 1968 until 1975, and established the regime of Democratic Kampuchea.

Pol Pot, who rose to the leadership of the communist movement in the 1960s, was born in 1928 (some sources say in 1925) in Kampong Thum Province, north of Phnom Penh. He attended a technical high school in the capital and then went to Paris in 1949 to study radio electronics (other sources say he attended a school for printers and typesetters and also studied civil engineering). Described by one source as a "determined, rather plodding organizer", he failed to obtain a degree, but, according to the Catholic priest, Fr. François Ponchaud, he acquired a taste for the classics of French literature as well as for the writings of Marx.

Another member of the Paris student group was Ieng Sary. He was a Chinese-Khmer born in 1930 in South Vietnam. He attended the elite Lycée Sisowath in Phnom Penh before beginning courses in commerce and politics at the Institut d'études politiques de Paris (more widely known as Sciences Po) in France. Khieu Samphan, considered "one of the most brilliant intellects of his generation", was born in 1931 and specialized in economics and politics during his time in Paris. In talent he was rivaled by Hou Yuon, born in 1930, who was described as being "of truly astounding physical and intellectual strength", and who studied economics and law. Son Sen, born in 1930, studied education and literature; Hu Nim, born in 1932, studied law.

These men were perhaps the most educated leaders in the history of Asian communism. Two of them, Khieu Samphan and Hou Yuon, earned doctorates from the University of Paris; Hu Nim obtained his degree from the University of Phnom Penh in 1965. In retrospect, it seems enigmatic that these talented members of the elite, sent to France on government scholarships, could launch the bloodiest and most radical revolution in modern Asian history. Most came from landowner or civil servant families. Pol Pot and Hou Yuon may have been related to the royal family.

An older sister of Pol Pot had been a concubine at the court of King Monivong. Three of the Paris group forged a bond that survived years of revolutionary struggle and intraparty strife, Pol Pot and Ieng Sary married Khieu Ponnary and Khieu Thirith (also known as Ieng Thirith), purportedly relatives of Khieu Samphan. These two well-educated women also played a central role in the regime of Democratic Kampuchea.

The intellectual ferment of Paris must have been a dizzying experience for young Khmers fresh from Phnom Penh or the provinces. A number sought refuge in the dogma of orthodox Marxism-Leninism. At some time between 1949 and 1951, Pol Pot and Ieng Sary joined the French Communist Party, the most tightly disciplined and Stalinist of Western Europe's communist movements. The party was also very anti-intellectual. In 1951 the two men went to East Berlin to participate in a youth festival. This experience is considered to have been a turning point in their ideological development.

Meeting with Khmers who were fighting with the Viet Minh (and whom they subsequently judged to be too subservient to the Vietnamese), they became convinced that only a tightly disciplined party organization and a readiness for armed struggle could achieve revolution. They transformed the Khmer Students' Association (KSA), to which most of the 200 or so Khmer students in Paris belonged, into an organization for nationalist and leftist ideas. Inside the KSA and its successor organizations was a secret organization known as the Cercle Marxiste. The organization was composed of cells of three to six members with most members knowing nothing about the overall structure of the organization.

In 1952 Pol Pot, Hou Yuon, Ieng Sary, and other leftists gained notoriety by sending an open letter to Sihanouk calling him the "strangler of infant democracy." A year later, the French authorities closed down the KSA. In 1956, however, Hou Yuon and Khieu Samphan helped to establish a new group, the Khmer Students' Union. Inside, the group was still run by the Cercle Marxiste.

The doctoral dissertations written by Hou Yuon and Khieu Samphan express basic themes that were later to become the cornerstones of the policy adopted by Democratic Kampuchea. The central role of the peasants in national development was espoused by Hou Yuon in his 1955 thesis, The Cambodian Peasants and Their Prospects for Modernization, which challenged the conventional view that urbanization and industrialization are necessary precursors of development. The major argument in Khieu Samphan's 1959 thesis, Cambodia's Economy and Industrial Development, was that the country had to become self-reliant and had to end its economic dependency on the developed world. In its general contours, Khieu's work reflected the influence of a branch of the "dependency theory" school, which blamed lack of development in the Third World on the economic domination of the industrialized nations.

== KPRP Second Congress ==
After returning to Cambodia in 1953, Pol Pot threw himself into party work. At first he went to join with forces allied to the Viet Minh operating in the rural areas of Kampong Cham Province (Kompong Cham). After the end of the war, he moved to Phnom Penh under Tou Samouth's "urban committee" where he became an important point of contact between above-ground parties of the left and the underground secret communist movement. His comrades, Ieng Sary and Hou Yuon, became teachers at a new private high school, the Lycée Kambuboth, which Hou Yuon helped to establish.

Khieu Samphan returned from Paris in 1959, taught as a member of the law faculty of the University of Phnom Penh, and started a left-wing, French-language publication, L'Observateur. The paper soon acquired a reputation in Phnom Penh's small academic circle. The following year, the government closed the paper, and Sihanouk's police publicly humiliated Khieu by beating, undressing and photographing him in public—as Shawcross notes, "not the sort of humiliation that men forgive or forget." Yet the experience did not prevent Khieu from advocating cooperation with Sihanouk in order to promote a united front against United States activities in South Vietnam. As mentioned, Khieu Samphan, Hou Yuon, and Hu Nim were forced to "work through the system" by joining the Sangkum and by accepting posts in the prince's government.

In late September, 1960, twenty-one leaders of the KPRP held a secret congress in a vacant room of the Phnom Penh railroad station. This pivotal event remains shrouded in mystery because its outcome has become an object of contention (and considerable historical rewriting) between pro-Vietnamese and anti-Vietnamese Khmer communist factions. The question of cooperation with, or resistance to, Sihanouk was thoroughly discussed. Tou Samouth, who advocated a policy of cooperation, was elected general secretary of the KPRP that was renamed the Workers' Party of Kampuchea (WPK).

His ally, Nuon Chea (also known as Long Reth), became deputy general secretary. However, Pol Pot and Ieng Sary were named to the Political Bureau to occupy the third and the fifth highest positions in the renamed party's hierarchy. The name change is significant. By calling itself a workers' party, the Cambodian movement claimed equal status with the Vietnam Workers' Party. The pro-Vietnamese regime of the People's Republic of Kampuchea (PRK) implied in the 1980s that the September 1960 meeting was nothing more than the second congress of the KPRP.

On July 20, 1962, Tou Samouth was murdered by the Cambodian government. In February 1963, at the WPK's second congress, Pol Pot was chosen to succeed Tou Samouth as the party's general secretary. Tou's allies, Nuon Chea and Keo Meas, were removed from the Central Committee and replaced by Son Sen and Vorn Vet. From then on, Pol Pot and loyal comrades from his Paris student days controlled the party center, edging out older veterans whom they considered excessively pro-Vietnamese.

In July 1963, Pol Pot and most of the central committee left Phnom Penh to establish an insurgent base in Rotanokiri (Ratanakiri) Province in the northeast. Pol Pot had shortly before been put on a list of thirty four leftists who were summoned by Sihanouk to join the government and sign statements saying Sihanouk was the only possible leader for the country. Pol Pot and Chou Chet were the only people on the list who escaped. All the others agreed to cooperate with the government and were afterward under 24 hour surveillance by the police.

The region Pol Pot and the others moved to was inhabited by tribal minorities, the Khmer Loeu, whose rough treatment (including resettlement and forced assimilation) at the hands of the central government made them willing recruits for a guerrilla struggle. In 1965 Pol Pot made a visit of several months duration to North Vietnam and China. He probably received some training in China, which must have enhanced his prestige when he returned to the WPK's liberated areas. Despite friendly relations between Sihanouk and the Chinese, the latter kept Pol Pot's visit a secret from Sihanouk. In September 1966, the party changed its name in secret to the Kampuchean (or Khmer) Communist Party (KCP). The change in the name of the party was a closely guarded secret. Lower ranking members of the party and even the Vietnamese were not told of it and neither was the membership until many years later.
