= 1970 Cambodian Chief of State election =

- 19 March 1970
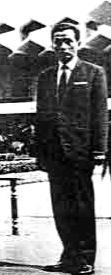
Candidate	Cheng Heng
Party	Independent
Electoral vote	Elected
Chief of State before election
Cheng Heng (acting)
Independent
Elected Chief of State
Cheng Heng (acting)
Independent

A election was held on 19 March 1970, to determine the acting Chief of State.

== Background ==
While Norodom Sihanouk was aboard, Cheng Heng acted from January 1970 onwards as Chief of State for Sihanouk, however Sihanouk still held the ofgice. Ten days later Prime Minister Lon Nol and Deputy Prime Minister Sisowath Sirik Matak led a coup d'état, the pro-Lon Nol faction of the Royal Khmer Armed Forces took up positions around the capital, and a debate was held within the National Assembly under In Tam's direction, in the end the majority unanimously voted to invoke Article 122 of the Cambodian constitution, which withdrew confidence in Sihanouk. With that Cheng Heng was the acting Chief of State, without that Sihanouk still hold the position.

== Election ==
On 19 March 1970 at two pm, the National Assembly elected Cheng Heng to be the acting Chief of State.

== Aftermath ==
On 21 March 1970, Cheng Heng took the oath.
