= Peter Khoy Saukam =

Cambodian politician

General Peter Khoy Saukam
- សូកាំ ខូយ
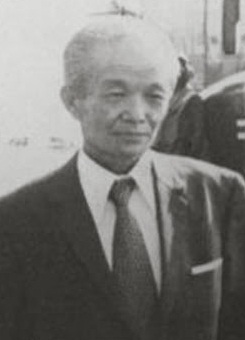
- Khoy in 1975

Acting President of the Khmer Republic
- In office 1 April 1975 – 12 April 1975
- Prime Minister: Long Boret
- Preceded by: Lon Nol
- Succeeded by: Sak Sutsakhan as Chairman of the Supreme Committee

President of the Senate
- In office 1972–1975
- Preceded by: Position established
- Succeeded by: Chea Sim (1999)

Personal details
- Born: Saukam Khoy; 2 February 1915 Cambodia, French Indochina
- Died: 14 November 2008 (aged 93) Stockton, California, U.S.
- Party: Social Republican Party
- Spouse: Vom Tep Saukam
- Children: 7

Military service
- Allegiance: First Kingdom of Cambodia; Khmer Republic
- Branch/service: Royal Cambodian Army; Khmer National Army
- Years of service: 1940–1975
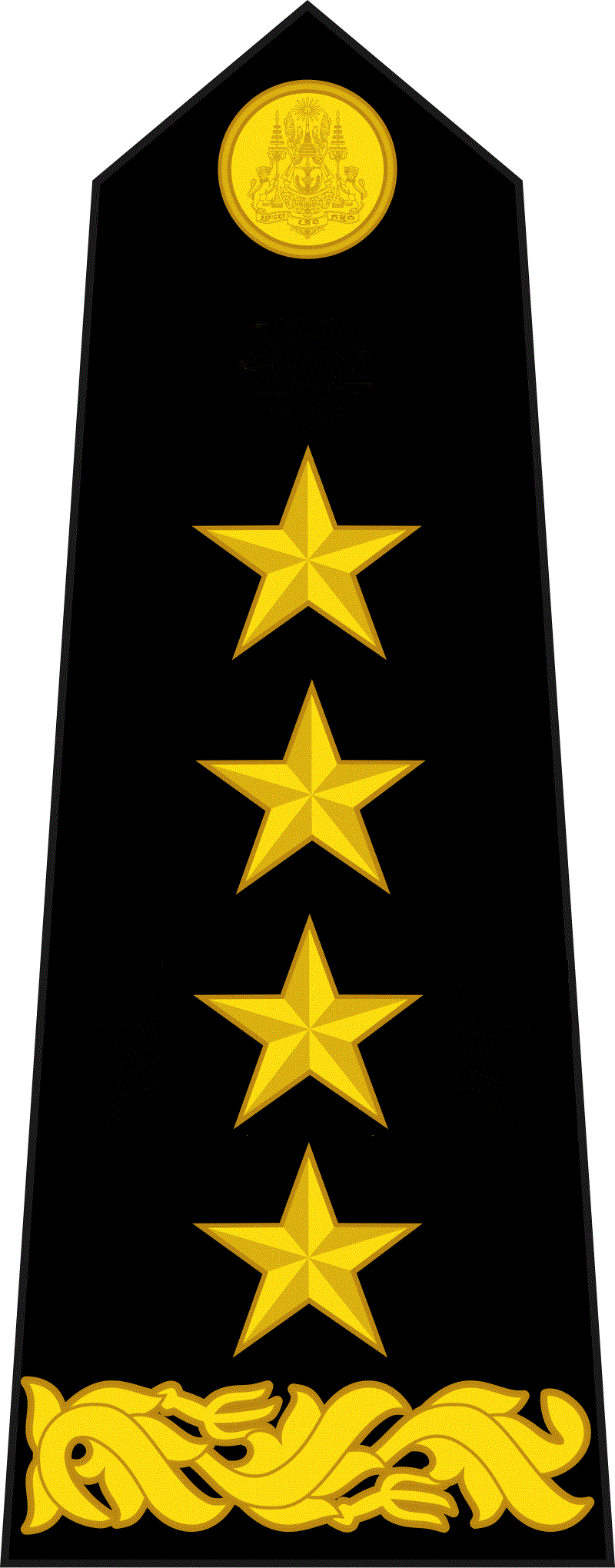
- Rank: General
- Battles/wars: World War II; First Indochina War; Cambodian Civil War

Peter Khoy Saukam (born Saukam Khoy Khmer: សូកាំ ខូយ; 2 February 1915 – 14 November 2008) was a Cambodian senior military officer and politician who served as Acting President of the Khmer Republic for 12 days in April 1975. He was President of the Senate from 1972 to 1975.

== Early life ==
Born on 2 February 1915, Saukam Khoy enlisted into the Khmer Royal Army in 1940, when he was 25. He achieved the rank of lieutenant-colonel in 1953 and subsequently, lieutenant-general. He became President of the Senate of the Khmer Republic in 1972.

== Presidency ==
He took office on 1 April 1975, when a tearful Lon Nol left 'temporarily' with his entire family for Bali in Indonesia after an invitation from his friend, Indonesian President Suharto.

Khoy's time in office was short. He left Phnom Penh together with American Ambassador John Gunther Dean aboard a CH-53 helicopter during the evacuation of American embassy staff and civilians, dubbed Operation Eagle Pull on 12 April, just five days before Phnom Penh fell to the Khmer Rouge led by their new organization as Angkar.

== Death ==
Khoy died at the age of 93 in Stockton, California, United States, on 14 November 2008.
