= Ek Yi Oun =

18th Prime Minister of Cambodia

- ងក យីអ៊ុន

Prime Minister of Cambodia
- In office 11 January 1958 – 17 January 1958
- Monarch: Norodom Suramarit
- Preceded by: Sim Var
- Succeeded by: Penn Nouth

Personal details
- Born: 1910 Phnom Penh, Cambodia, French Indochina
- Died: January 2013 (aged 102–103) Cambodia
- Party: Sangkum

Ek Yi Oun (Khmer: ឯក យីអ៊ុន; 1910 – January 2013) was a Cambodian politician and a member of the Sangkum party who served as the Prime Minister of Cambodia from 11 January until 17 January 1958. With a term of six days, he remains the shortest-served Prime Minister of Cambodia to date. He served as acting President of the National Assembly of Cambodia in 1970.
