= 1962 Cambodian general election =

National election

- 10 June 1962

All 77 seats in the National Assembly 39 seats needed for a majority
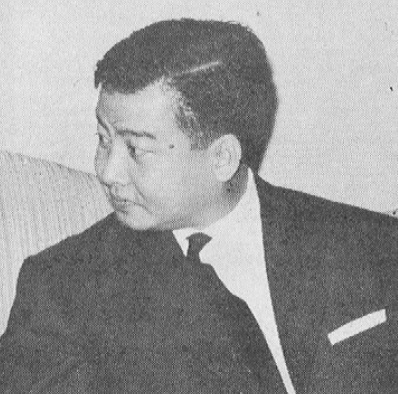
	First party
Leader	Norodom Sihanouk
Party	Sangkum
Seats before	61
Seats won	77
Seat change	▲16
Percentage	100%
Swing	▲0.1%

General elections were held in Cambodia on 10 June 1962. Only candidates of the Sangkum party were allowed to contest the election, although more than one candidate could run in a constituency. As a result, the party won all 77 seats.

== Results ==
Party	Seats	+/–
Sangkum	77	+16
Total	77	+16
Source: Nohlen et al.
