= Khuon Sudary =

Cambodian politician

Samdech Maha Rathsapheathika Thipadei Khuon Sudary MP
- ឃួន សុដារី

President of the National Assembly
- Incumbent
- Assumed office 22 August 2023
- Monarch: Norodom Sihamoni
- Vice President: Cheam Yeab; Vong Sauth
- Preceded by: Heng Samrin

Second Vice President of the National Assembly
- In office 6 September 2018 – 22 August 2023
- President: Heng Samrin
- Preceded by: Nguon Nhel
- Succeeded by: Vong Sauth
- In office 25 April 2012 – 26 August 2014
- President: Heng Samrin
- Preceded by: Say Chhum
- Succeeded by: Nguon Nhel

Member of the National Assembly
- Incumbent
- Assumed office 25 November 1998
- Constituency: Kandal

Personal details
- Born: 18 November 1952 (age 73) Sangkae, Battambang, Cambodia, French Indochina
- Party: People's (since 1980)
- Education: International Institute for Journalism; Royal University of Phnom Penh

Khuon Sudary (Khmer: ឃួន សុដារី, UNGEGN: Khuŏn Sŏdari, ALA-LC: Ghuan Suṭārī [kʰuən soɗaːriː]; born 8 November 1952) is a Cambodian politician who has been the President of the National Assembly since 2023, and a member of the assembly since 1998. She is the first woman to serve as its president. A member of the Cambodian People's Party, she serves in its politburo and on its central committee.

== Early life and education ==
Khuon Sudary was born in the Battambang Province, French protectorate of Cambodia, on 8 November 1952. She graduated from the Royal University of Phnom Penh with a bachelor's degree in Khmer and English literature after attending from 1970 to 1975, and from the International Institute for Journalism in 1980.

== Career ==
At the Cambodian People's Party's (CCP) newspaper Prachea Chun Sudary was a reporter from 1979 to 1984, deputy director-general from 1984 to 1987, and director general since 1987. In 1980, Sudary joined the CPP. Sudary is a member of the CPP's politburo and its central committee.

From 1993 to 1998, Sudary was an advisor to the President of the National Assembly. She was elected to the assembly in 1998. She was chair of the Cambodian Women Parliamentarian Caucus from 2015 to 2018.

Say Chhum resigned as 2nd Vice President of the assembly in order to become 1st Vice President of the Senate. Sudary was elected to succeed him as 2nd Vice President on 25 April 2012. In 2023, she was elected President of the assembly and was the first woman to hold that position.

Sudary is vice president of the ASEAN Inter-Parliamentary Assembly, the International Conference of Asian Political Parties, and the Asian Parliamentary Assembly. She is chair of the Asian Cultural Council. Sudary is a member of the Cambodian Red Cross' central committee.

== Personal life ==
Sudary practices Buddhism. She is a native speaker of Khmer and can speak English and French. She was given the Royal Order of Cambodia on 11 May 2002, the Royal Order of Monisaraphon on 18 June 2007, the Grand Order of National Merit was given to her on 1 December 2010, and the title of Samdech was given to her on 2 September 2023.

== Works cited ==
=== News ===
- "National Assembly Members Elect Their 2nd Vice President". The Phnom Penh Post. 27 April 2012. Archived from the original on 13 April 2014.
- Sokunthea, Neang (10 August 2023). "Sudary becomes first woman to head National Assembly". Agence Kampuchea Press. Archived from the original on 24 April 2025.

=== Web ===
- "Samdech Khuon Sudary". National Assembly. Archived from the original on 30 June 2025.

Political offices
Preceded by Heng Samrin	President of the National Assembly; 2023–present	Incumbent
Preceded by Say Chhum; Nguon Nhel	Second Vice President of the National Assembly; 2012–2014; 2018–2023	Succeeded by Nguon Nhel; Vong Sauth
