= 1960 Cambodian policy referendum =

A referendum on government policy was held in Cambodia on 5 June 1960. Voters were offered four choices of policies to approve; those of Norodom Sihanouk, Son Ngoc Thanh or the communists, with a fourth choice of being "indifferent". Sihanouk's policies received all but 359 of the two million ballots cast.

== Results ==
Choice	Votes	%
Norodom Sihanouk	2,020,349	99.97
Son Ngoc Thanh	133	0.01
Communist	133	0.01
Indifferent	93	0.01
Invalid/blank votes	31	–
Total	2,020,739	100
Registered voters/turnout	2,199,731	91.86
Source: Direct Democracy
