= Keo Meas =

Cambodian politician

- កែវ មាស
- Born: 1926; French Indochina
- Died: 1976 (aged 49–50); Democratic Kampuchea
- Occupation: Politician

Keo Meas (Khmer: កែវ មាស, 1926–1976) was a Cambodian communist politician. Keo Meas, then a fourth-year student at the Phnom Penh Teachers Training College, was recruited to the Indochinese Communist Party by Son Sichan in 1946. In 1950, he became a leading figure within the United Issarak Front. At the same time he was a leading figure in the Phnom Penh city unit of the ICP.

Keo Meas was involved in the reorganization of the city party unit, after it had been broken up by arrests in July 1952. In December the same year, he represented the UIF at the People's Peace Conference in Vienna.

When the Cambodian parts of the ICP were converted to the Khmer People's Revolutionary Party in 1954, Keo Meas became the leader of the Phnom Penh unit of the new party. After the cessation of hostilities in the same year, Keo Meas was one of the representatives of the UIF in the Viet Minh side of the Joint Commission for the Implementation of the Geneva Accords.

As the KPRP was an underground party, Keo Meas, Non Suon and Penn Yuth were assigned to form a legal front of the party. In late 1954 they attempted to register the 'Khmer Resistance Party', but their registration was rejected. In early 1955, they were able to register themselves as Krom Pracheachon ('People's Group').

In May 1956, Keo Meas, along with Non Suon and Nop Bophann, restarted Pracheachon as a weekly newspaper.

As the KPRP went through a period of crisis, Tou Samouth formed a reorganized 4-member party leadership (labelled the 'urban committee'). It is believed that Keo Meas was part of this committee, although there are also reports that Saloth Sar (Pol Pot) would have been the fourth member of the committee instead.

At the time of the March 1958 parliamentary election, the Krom Pracheachon only dared to put up five candidates. Keo Meas stood in a Phnom Penh constituency. However, due to the harsh political climate, Keo Meas was the only Krom Pracheachon candidate able to run any campaign work at all. Official results gave Keo Meas 396 votes. Soon after the election, Keo Meas went underground and left the city. The secretaryship of the Phnom Penh party unit was passed on to Saloth Sar.

In 1960, as the KPRP held its second congress, Keo Meas was included in the party Central Committee. At the same congress, the name of the party was changed to 'Workers Party of Kampuchea'. However, at the party congress in 1963, Keo Meas was excluded from the Central Committee.

Keo Meas travelled to Hanoi in the second half of 1968, to seek support from the exiled communist leadership for the ongoing struggle of the party in Cambodia. He met with veteran leader Son Ngoc Minh and with Vietnamese officials, but was unable to sway them over to support armed revolt against the Sihanouk regime, whom the Vietnamese considered a lesser evil. It is also believed that Keo Meas accompanied Pol Pot on his visit to Hanoi and Beijing in 1969. Keo Meas was in Hanoi at the time of Pol Pot's return to Cambodia, and it had been Keo Meas who had organized Pol Pot journey back. Keo Meas stayed in Hanoi for some time.

Keo Meas became the ambassador of the Royal Governmental of National Unity of Kampuchea to the People's Republic of China. By March 1972, he lost this position, and shifted to Hanoi. In Hanoi, he worked under direction of Ieng Thirith.

Keo Meas returned to Cambodia in May 1975 to begin working at the office of the party Central Committee. He was however put in house arrest, suspected of being pro-Vietnamese. On 20 September 1976, he was arrested and was taken to S-21. Even under intense pressure he continued to protest his innocence. Just over a month later he was killed.
