= Cheng Heng =

Cambodian politician

- ឆេង ហេង
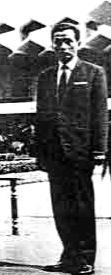
- Cheng Heng in September 1970

Chief of State of the Khmer Republic
- In office 9 October 1970 – 10 March 1972
- Prime Minister: Lon Nol; Sisowath Sirik Matak
- Preceded by: Himself as Chief of State of the Kingdom of Cambodia
- Succeeded by: Lon Nol (as President of the Khmer Republic)

Chief of State of the State of Cambodia
- Acting
- In office 18 March 1970 – 9 October 1970
- Monarch: Sisowath Kossamak
- Prime Minister: Lon Nol
- Preceded by: Norodom Sihanouk
- Succeeded by: Himself as Chief of State of the Khmer Republic

President of the National Assembly
- In office 1969–1970
- Prime Minister: Lon Nol
- Succeeded by: Ek Yi Oun

Personal details
- Born: January 10, 1910 Takéo, Cambodia, French Indochina
- Died: March 15, 1996 (aged 86) Portland, Oregon, United States
- Party: Social Republican Party
- Other party: Sangkum

Cheng Heng (Khmer: ឆេង ហេង; 10 January 1917 – 15 March 1996) was Head of State of Cambodia from 1970 to 1972, and was a relatively prominent political figure during the Khmer Republic period (1970–1975).

== Early life ==
Heng was born into an ethnic Chinese family in Takéo. He went on to become a prosperous businessman and landowner. He served in the civil service of colonial Cambodia, eventually reaching the grade of Oudom-Montrey (senior grade colonial bureaucrat) by the mid-1950s.

== Political career ==
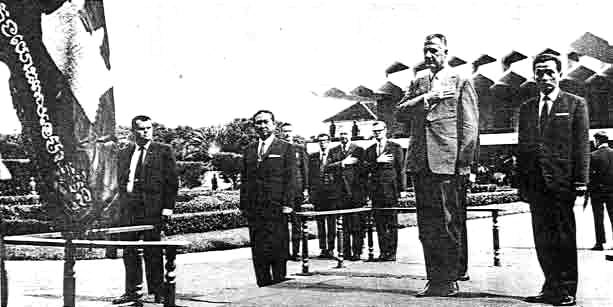
President Cheng Heng (far right) with US Vice President Spiro Agnew during his visit to Cambodia, September 1970.

His early political career, during the period when Prince Norodom Sihanouk's Sangkum party controlled the country, is relatively obscure: he entered politics in 1958, and served as Secretary of State for Agriculture in 1961–2. He was elected as the Sangkum deputy for Takhmau in 1962, but lost in the 1966 elections to a rival candidate, a young Sihanoukist doctor called Keo Sann. Heng subsequently returned via a 1967 by-election in Phnom Penh, and by 1970 was serving as President of Cambodia's National Assembly. Heng's levels of political support appear to have been limited up until 1970; aside from being President of the Assembly, he had previously been director of the main Phnom Penh prison.

Immediately subsequent to the Cambodian coup of 1970, in which the Prime Minister and Deputy Prime Minister, General Lon Nol and Prince Sisowath Sirik Matak, engineered Sihanouk's removal, Heng was made Head of State until elections could be arranged. This was a largely ceremonial role, as Lon Nol had assumed most of the Head of State's political powers on an emergency basis: Sihanouk, from exile, was to dismiss Heng as an "insignificant puppet".

Apart from giving press conferences, Heng was also called on to receive visiting foreign politicians: William Shawcross relates an incident during Spiro Agnew's July 1970 visit to Phnom Penh, in which that Heng was forced to contend with United States Secret Service personnel training their guns on him while he was attempting to welcome Agnew to the Royal Palace.

Nol subsequently used a political crisis to remove Heng from power and take over the role himself early in 1972. In 1973, after American pressure on Lon Nol to broaden political involvement, Heng was made vice-chairman of a 'High Political Council' set up to govern the country. The council's influence was soon, however, sidelined, and Nol resumed personalist rule of the deteriorating Republic.

In 1975, with the Khmer Rouge forces surrounding the capital, Heng's name was published on a list of "Seven Traitors" (also including Lon Nol, Sisowath Sirik Matak, In Tam, Long Boret, Sosthene Fernandez and Son Ngoc Thanh) who were threatened with immediate execution under Angkar's grip at the event of a Communist victory. Heng fled the country on April 1 for Paris, where he became associated with the group of exiles centred on Son Sann.

Heng returned to Cambodia after the UN-brokered 1991 political settlement (the Paris Peace Agreements) and had some further involvement in politics, founding the Republican Coalition Party which unsuccessfully took part in the 1993 elections.

He died on 15 March 1996 at the age of 86 in Portland, Oregon, the United States.

== Other activities ==
- World Academy of Art and Science, Fellow

== Sources ==
- Corfield, J. Khmers Stand Up! A History of the Cambodian Government, 1970-1975, Monash Asia Institute, 1994
- 梁明 (Liang, Ming)， "高棉華僑概況 (Overview of the Khmer Chinese)–海外華人青少年叢書"， 1988, 华侨协会总会主编–正中书局印行
- Shawcross, W. Sideshow: Kissinger, Nixon, and the Destruction of Cambodia, Simon & Schuster, 1979
- Norodom Sihanouk, My War with the CIA, Random House, 1973

Cheng Heng Born: 10 January 1910 Died: 15 March 1996
Political offices
Preceded by Norodom Sihanouk	Head of State of Cambodia; 1970–1972	Succeeded by Lon Nol as President
