= Chuop Hell =

Cambodian statesman (1909–ca. 1975)

- ជួប ហ៊ែល

President of the National Assembly
- In office 1958–1962
- Preceded by: ?
- Succeeded by: Chau Sen Cocsal

Counselor to Chief of State
- In office Unknown–Unknown

Chief of State of Cambodia
- Acting; 13 June 1960 – 20 June 1960
- Prime Minister: Pho Proeung
- Preceded by: Sisowath Monireth (acting) as President of the Regency Council
- Succeeded by: Norodom Sihanouk (as head of state); Sisowath Kossamak (as queen)
- Acting; 3 April 1960 – 6 April 1960
- Prime Minister: Norodom Sihanouk
- Preceded by: Norodom Suramarit as King
- Succeeded by: Sisowath Monireth as President of the Regency Council

Ambassador to Singapore
- In office 1967–1968

Agriculture Minister of Cambodia
- In office 14 May 1951 – 12 October 1951

Personal details
- Born: 1909
- Died: 1975 (aged 65–66)
- Party: Sangkum

Chuop Hell (Note: Khmer: ជួប ហ៊ែល, Chuap Hael; Khmer pronunciation: [cuəp hael]), (1909 – c. 1975) was a Cambodian statesman and President of the National Assembly from 1958 to 1962. He was the acting Head of State of Cambodia from 3 April 1960 until 6 April 1960 and from 13 June 1960 until 20 June 1960.
