= 1966 Cambodian general election =

- 11 September 1966

All 82 seats in the National Assembly 42 seats needed for a majority
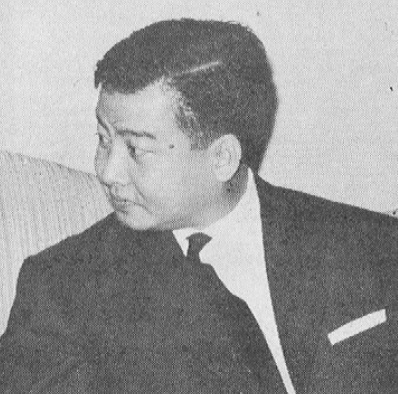
	First party
Leader	Norodom Sihanouk
Party	Sangkum
Last election	77
Seats won	82
Seat change	▲5
Percentage	100%
Prime Minister before election
Norodom Kantol
Sangkum
Elected Prime Minister
Lon Nol
Sangkum

General elections were held in Cambodia on 11 September 1966. Only candidates of the Sangkum party were allowed to contest the election, although more than one candidate could run in a constituency. As a result, the party won all 82 seats. The conservative wing of the Sangkum gained a majority. On 18 October the National Assembly of Cambodia nominated Lon Nol as Prime Minister.

In this election, there were 415 candidates running for the 82 seats in the National Assembly. All 415 candidates were apart of Sangkum.

== Results ==
Only 28 of the 82 deputies had been previously elected to Parliament, six of whom were members of the conservative wing of the Sangkum.

Party	Seats	+/–
Sangkum	82	+5
Total	82	+5
Source: Nohlen et al.

== Government formation ==
The conservative wing of the Sangkum won a two-thirds majority in parliament, meaning Sihanouk could not prevent the opposition from blocking nominations. As a result, Lon Nol was elected Prime Minister with 59 votes in favour and 23 against.
