= Uch Ven =

Cambodian politician

Uch Ven is a Cambodian communist and former member of the National Assembly of Cambodia.
