= Nop Bophann =

Cambodian newspaper editor

Nop Bophann (died 1959) was a Cambodian newspaper editor. He had been one of the representatives of the United Issarak Front in the Viet Minh side of the Joint Commission for the Implementation of the Geneva Accords. In May 1956, Nop Bophann, along with Non Suon and Keo Meas, restarted Pracheachon as a weekly newspaper. Nop Bophann became the editor of the publication. On October 11, 1959, Nop Bophann was shot dead outside a military barrack in Phnom Penh.
