= 1958 Cambodian general election =

- 23 March 1958

All 61 seats in the National Assembly 31 seats needed for a majority
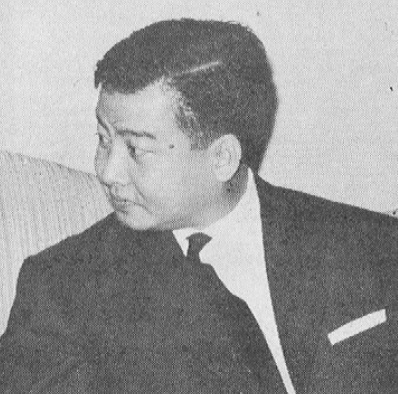
	First party
Leader	Norodom Sihanouk
Party	Sangkum
Last election	91
Seats won	61
Seat change	▼30
Popular vote	1,646,488
Percentage	99.98%
Swing	▲17.26pp

General elections were held in Cambodia on 23 March 1958. The Sangkum party received all but 409 of the 1.6 million votes, winning all 61 seats in the National Assembly.

== Results ==
Party	Votes	%	Seats	+/–
Sangkum	1,646,488	99.98	61	–30
Pracheachon	409	0.02	0	0
Total	1,646,897	100.00	61	–30
Source: Nohlen et al.

=== By district ===
Most districts only had one Sangkum candidate, but one Phnom Penh district was contested by a Pracheachon candidate.

Candidate	Party	Votes	%
Nhieim Sokphai	Sangkum	13,542	97.16
Keo Meas	Pracheachon	396	2.84
Total		13,938	100.00
Source: Corfield
