= Deputy presidents of the State Presidium of Kampuchea =

Head of state of Democratic Kampuchea (1976–1978)

The deputy president of the State Presidium of Kampuchea (Khmer: អនុប្រធានគណៈប្រធានរដ្ឋនៃកម្ពុជា) was deputy head of state of Democratic Kampuchea from 1976 to 1978.

== List of deputy presidents ==
Name	Position	Period	President
So Phim	First Deputy President	April 1976 – March 1978	Khieu Samphan
Nhim Ros	Second Deputy President	April 1976 – May 1978	Khieu Samphan

== See also ==
- Vice President of the State Council of Cambodia
