= Ung Hong Sath =

Cambodian politician

Ung Hong Sath (Khmer: អ៊ុង ហុងសាធ) is the former minister for the interior, cults, and relations with parliament of Cambodia.

He was president of the National Assembly from 1963 to 1966.
