= Sangkum =

1955–1970 Cambodian political organisation set up by Prince Norodom Sihanouk

Popular Socialist Community សង្គមរាស្ត្រនិយម Communauté socialiste populaire
- President: Norodom Sihanouk; In Tam
- Founder: Norodom Sihanouk
- Founded: 22 March 1955 (71 years, 166 days)
- Dissolved: 18 February 1971 (55 years, 198 days)
- Merger of: Victorious Northeast; Khmer Renovation; Liberal Party; People's Party
- Split from: Democratic Party (factions)
- Succeeded by: FUNCINPEC
- Youth wing: Royal Khmer Socialist Youth
- Membership (1955): 450,000
- Ideology: Royal Buddhist socialism/Khmer socialism; Sihanoukism; Khmer nationalism; National conservatism; Democratic socialism; Royalism; Anti-imperialism; Statism; Authoritarianism; Buddhist socialism; Feudalist characteristics; Economic nationalism; Egalitarianism
- Political position: Syncretic (Left-wing to Far-right)
- Religion: Theravada Buddhism
- National Assembly (1966): 82 / 82

The Sangkum Reastr Niyum (Khmer: សង្គមរាស្ត្រនិយម, Sângkôm Réastrnĭyôm [sɑŋkɔm riəhnijɔm], lit. 'Popular Community'; French: Communauté socialiste populaire), usually translated as Popular (or People's) Socialist Community and commonly known simply as the Sangkum (Khmer: សង្គម, Sângkôm [sɑŋkɔm]; lit. 'Society' or 'Community'), was a political organisation set up on 22 March 1955 by Prince Norodom Sihanouk of Cambodia. Though it described itself as a 'movement' rather than a political party (members had to abjure membership of any political group), the Sangkum retained control of the government of Cambodia throughout the first administration of Sihanouk, from 1955 to 1971. Central to the Sangkum ideology were nationalism, conservatism, preserving the monarchy, and a conservative interpretation of Buddhism.

== Formation ==
The Sangkum came into existence after Sihanouk stepped down from the throne in 1955 in favour of his father Norodom Suramarit, with the intention of concentrating on politics.

The movement was based on four small monarchist, rightist parties, including the Victorious Northeast party of Dap Chhuon and the Khmer Renovation party of Lon Nol. Sihanouk broadened this political base into the Sangkum in order to fight the 1955 parliamentary election, the first after independence. Despite its apolitical image, the Sangkum effectively functioned as the pro-Sihanouk party. It won an overwhelming victory in the elections: there were subsequently allegations of massive electoral fraud, and of intimidation directed against both the opposing Democratic Party and the socialist Krom Pracheachon.

== Policies and character ==
Despite its name, Sangkum's "Royal-Buddhist socialism" or "Khmer socialism" had little to do with socialism, neither with the Marxist variant nor with Anglo-Saxon "welfare socialism". Lacking a consistent political philosophy, it combined pseudo-socialist slogans with conservative social values, monarchism, nationalism and Theravada Buddhist teachings. It was stated that administrators would be "socialists for the well-being of the people and royalists for the prestige and cohesion of the nation". At the same time, the Sangkum was designed to democraticise the country and to exert political control. Rather than subscribing to a certain ideology, Sangkum was defined by its leader Prince Sihanouk and his personal popularity.

In power, the Sangkum functioned according to principles of 'Buddhist socialism', a rather vague construct that while claiming to seek progressive goals and the end of social injustice, was based around the conservative religious and social traditions of Cambodia. Rather than doing away with private property, 'Buddhist socialism' encouraged the wealthy to give to the poor in order to gain merit. Public figures were also instructed to be fully accountable to the populace, transparent in their dealings, and were encouraged to take regular breaks to perform ordinary agricultural-related work (Sihanouk often had himself photographed performing such labour during his visits to development projects).

In practice, economic management developed as a form of "crony socialism" analogous to crony capitalism: state enterprises were set up and then managed by members of the Sangkum elite, often for their own personal gain. State organisations set up under the Sangkum included OROC, the Office royale de coopération, which handled trade, import and export.

In 1957, Sihanouk set up a youth wing of the Sangkum, known as the Royal Khmer Socialist Youth (French: Jeunesse socialiste royale khmère, JSRK).

In 1969, Sihanouk wrote a book with the title "Notre socialisme buddhique" which was about the Royal Buddhist Socialism of the party.

== Domestic politics under the Sangkum ==
Sihanouk's method of alternately criticising his opponents in various public forums, and then of offering them posts within the Sangkum in a demand that they positively contribute to Cambodian society, had the dual effect of stifling dissent and of integrating much of the opposition into his regime. Sihanouk attempted to construct an image of Cambodia as a "Southeast Asian Camelot", an oasis of peace and social order amidst the conflict affecting the rest of the region. Internationally, an official policy of neutrality was adopted.

During the period of Sihanouk's rule, the Sangkum managed to absorb many of the rightist and centrist elements of Cambodian politics, as well as pro-Sihanouk elements of the left and moderate communists: only the more hardline secret elements of the Communist Party of Kampuchea avoided collaborating with Sihanouk's regime. Several prominent communists, such as Hu Nim and Khieu Samphan, accepted posts with the Sangkum in an attempt to work with the system. In the early 1960s, Samphan – later to become the head of state under the Khmer Rouge – was called on by Sihanouk to implement a series of economic reforms based on plans outlined in Samphan's PhD thesis.

While the Democratic Party, the representatives of moderate, progressive republican politics in the Cambodian political milieu, were effectively incorporated into the Sangkum in 1957, many republican moderates simply avoided politics altogether until the period immediately after 1970.

The only notable element to remain outside the Sangkum, other than the hardline communists, was the right-wing, anti-monarchist nationalist Son Ngoc Thanh, whose Khmer Serei irregulars maintained armed resistance with funding from Thailand. Sihanouk was to label his opponents on the right as the "Khmer Bleu" to distinguish them from his opponents on the left. However, it seems that during the late 1950s and early 1960s there was relatively little violent repression of opposition to the Sangkum (although there was repeated political intimidation of the leftist Pracheachon party, who were accused of being pro-Vietnam) and the country as a whole experienced a period of comparative stability. The one exception was again the Khmer Serei, who were dealt with harshly: Preap In, a Khmer Serei activist who attempted to negotiate with Sihanouk in 1963, was arrested and his subsequent execution shown in cinemas across the country. The same treatment was given to another group of alleged Khmer Serei leaders, Chau Bory (previously implicated in the Bangkok Plot), Chau Mathura, and Sau Ngoy, in 1967.

== End of the Sangkum era ==
Sihanouk was made Head of State for life in 1963. From the mid-1960s, however, fractures began to appear in the regime. The 1966 elections resulted in an overwhelming victory for rightist candidates; Sihanouk responded by creating a left-wing "Counter-Government", including Hu Nim and Khieu Samphan, to act as a check, and prevent the regime splitting completely.

Increasingly violent repression of the left, led by Lon Nol and the military in Sihanouk's name, came to alienate many of the remaining communists, especially the more moderate pro-Sihanouk faction who owed a strong allegiance to Vietnam and the Viet Minh. Sihanouk's public criticism of the 'Khmer Viet Minh' had the damaging effect of increasing the power of the hardline, anti-Vietnamese, but also anti-monarchical members of the CPK, led by Pol Pot. Escalation of the Second Indochina War also had a destabilising effect on both the political situation and the Cambodian economy. The Sangkum found itself locked in an increasingly bitter struggle with what it represented as 'foreign' elements of the Viet Minh and Pathet Lao within Cambodia: speaking on Phnom Penh radio after a group of Vietnamese communists was captured, Sihanouk stated that "I had them roasted [...] we had to feed them to the vultures".

The shockingly brutal tactics adopted by the Sangkum regime against not only leftists from outside the Cambodian borders, but also increasingly against the Khmer left, especially after a possibly CPK-backed rebellion in rural Battambang Province beginning in early 1967, presaged the similarly brutal conduct of the subsequent Cambodian Civil War. Reports stated that captured communists were summarily killed, in some cases being disembowelled or thrown from cliffs. The three remaining public representatives of the communists – Khieu Samphan, Hou Yuon and Hu Nim – fled to the forests in 1967-8, though at the time it was widely rumoured that they had been murdered by the Sangkum's police (after their reappearance in the 1970s, they were referred to in the press as the "Three Ghosts").

== Deposition of Sihanouk ==
Amid increasing political instability, Sihanouk was eventually deposed in 1970 by Lon Nol and the rightists led by In Tam and Prince Sisowath Sirik Matak. Subsequent to the coup, the Khmer Rumdo ("Liberation Khmer") guerrillas, armed and trained by North Vietnam, continued armed resistance on Sihanouk's behalf against his own former colleagues. Sihanouk's tactic of making common cause with the Khmer communist insurgents was to attract a huge number of recruits to their side. The Sangkum was formally dissolved on 18 February 1971.

Elements of Sihanouk's Sangkum regime went on to form the royalist party FUNCINPEC and its military wing, the Sihanouk National Army or ANS, which controlled large parts of rural Cambodia during the 1980s.

== Evaluation ==
Opinion remains sharply divided on the Sangkum movement, as on Sihanouk himself. Many commentators, particularly those on the left or those personally opposed to Sihanouk, have described the Sangkum as essentially a conservative movement which sought to maintain the power and influence of the Cambodian status quo through authoritarianism. Others, however, have noted that it vastly increased the participation of ordinary Cambodians in democracy, and describe it as a pragmatic movement which genuinely sought to bring community development to Cambodia through "expert guidance and gentle persuasion".

There is a certain degree of nostalgia amongst older Cambodians for the Sangkum era, especially given the relative stability of the years 1955–1965 in comparison to later periods. After the 1991 political settlement and Sihanouk's 1993 restoration as king, a number of Cambodian political parties used the term "Sangkum" in their name in order to associate themselves with this period.

== General election results ==
Election	Party leader	Votes			Seats		Position	Government
Election	Party leader	#	%	±	#	±	Position	Government
1955	Norodom Sihanouk	630,625	82.7%	New	91 / 91	New	▲1st	Sangkum
1958	Norodom Sihanouk	1,646,488	99.9%	▲17.2	61 / 61	▼30	1st	Sangkum
1962	Norodom Sihanouk	—N/a	100.0%	▲0.1	77 / 77	▲16	1st	Sangkum
1966	Norodom Sihanouk	—N/a	100.0%	Steady	82 / 82	▲5	1st	Sangkum

== See also ==
- Sihanoukism
