= Pach Chhoeun =

Cambodian journalist and nationalist

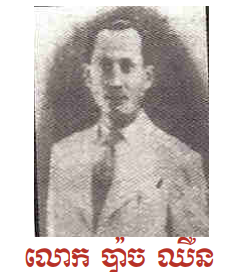
- Born: 1895
- Died: 18 October 1971 (aged 75–76)
- Citizenship: Cambodian
- Spouse(s): Douc Ok, eldest sister of Mr. Douc Rasy. Married March 26, 1923.
- Children: Mondet Chhoeun (Son)

Pach Chhoeun (1895-1971) was a Cambodian patriot, journalist and librarian. In 1936 he co-founded and worked as the Director of the first national Khmer-language newspaper, Nagara Vatta, (Pali for 'Angkor Wat'). The newspaper was an "expression of subdued anti-French colonialism". The newspaper "advocated very moderate reforms, more Cambodian participation in commerce and greater educational opportunities and equal opportunity treatment for Cambodians". Pach Chhoeun served in multiple government positions over the course of his political life including Minister of the National Economy in 1945, Minister of Information in 1951, as well as curator, archivist and first Director of the National Library of Cambodia in the 1950s. In later years, he served as advisor to Lon Nol, the Prime Minister and President of the Khmer Republic during the years 1970-1971.

== Biographical timeline ==
=== 1915-1920 ===
Pach Chhoeun enlisted in the French Colonial Army as an interpreter. He served in Flanders France during World War I. After WWI he returned to Phnom Penh.

=== 1921-1936 ===
Chhoeun traveled to work in Hanoi Vietnam and trained as an Archivist. In 1925, Chhoeun returned to Phnom Penh to work in the French Colonial Administration.

In 1927, Chhoeun resigned from the French Colonial Administration to become a self-employed private citizen involved in commercial real estate and banks.

=== 1936-1942 ===
In 1936, Chhoeun founded the Nagara Vatta newspaper with Sim Var and was later joined by Son Ngoc Than. The editorial stand of Nagara Vatta was pro-Cambodian without being anti-French. The newspaper "advocated very moderate reforms: more Cambodian participation in commerce, greater educational opportunities, equal treatment for Cambodian and French, all of which probably worried the traditional Cambodian elite more than the French, since their realization would have undermined the old oligarchy". It objected to Vietnamese domination of Cambodian civil service, Chinese domination of commerce and shortage of employment for educated Khmer, advocated modernization of the educational system, improved credit for Cambodian farmers, and low pay of Cambodian civil servants. "Nagara Vatta in terms of its own historical context, was the first time since French Colonialism beginning 1863, that a conversation had opened between the French and Cambodian elite that also included the Buddhist Sangha monks. The paper circulation rose to more than five thousand copies in 1937 with readership undoubtedly higher. The Nagara Vatta was important during this period because it gave thousands of Cambodians the chance for the first time to read about events in the outside world in their own language"

World War 2 in Southeast Asia affected Cambodian society. It was during the war period that French Admiral Jean Decoux appointed 19-year-old Norodom Sihanouk as King, April 25, 1941. The effects of Japanese occupation of Southeast Asia and the lack of French response to it in Cambodia contributed to Anti-French sentiment towards French colonialism. Cambodian independence had become primarily a matter of time. On July 17, 1942 Hem Chieu a popular Buddhist Sangha monk was implicated, accused and arrested suspected for organizing a French coup outraging many in the Cambodian educated elite and Sanga monk population. On July 20, 1942 Pach Chhoeun organized and led a demonstration in support of Hem Chieu. More than 1,500 supporters, half of them Buddhist Monks, marched along the Phnom Penh main boulevard to the Office of French Superior to demand his freedom. The march itself was peaceful and became known as the "Umbrella Protest (also known as War March)" because the peaceful Monks carried umbrellas to protect themselves from the sun. Pach Chhoeun was arrested as soon as he submitted the petition for Hem Chieu's release to the Consulate. Afterwards, the Nagara Vatta newspaper was shut down by the French government. Hem Chieu and Pach Chhoeun were sentenced to death but were later commuted to life imprisonment on Poulo Condor (Côn Đảo Prison). Pach Chhoeun with his leadership role in The Umbrella March of July 20, 1942 and along with his foundation of Nagara Vatta newspaper became established into Cambodian anti-colonial history and folklore as a non-communist Nationalist along with his colleague Son Ngoc Than

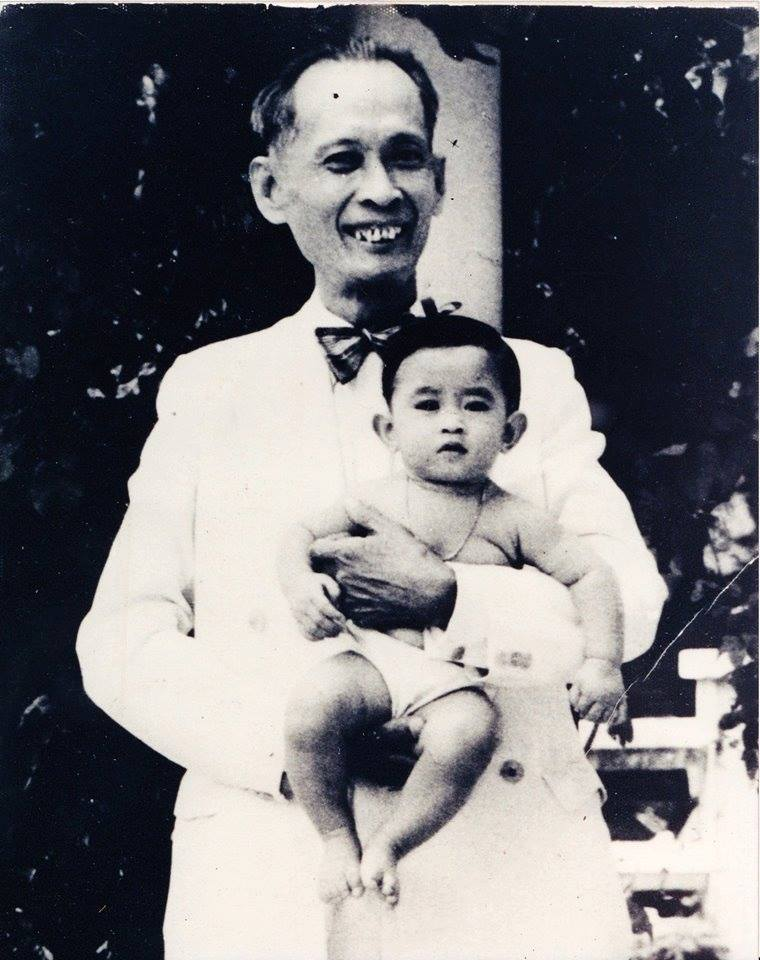
1953 picture of Pach Chhoeun with granddaughter.

=== 1945-1950 ===
Japanese military pushed out the French from Cambodia in March 1945. Norodom Sihanouk presided over a rally to proclaim Cambodia's Independence and commemorated the anti-French demonstration of the Umbrella March of July 20, 1942. Pach Chhoeun just released from Poulo Condor prison and Sơn Ngọc Thành returned from Tokyo joined Norodom Sihanouk at a rally in Phnom Penh. Son Ngoc Than became Prime Minister and Pach Chhoeun took a position as Minister of National Economy and Recovery. By October 1945 however, the French Government returned with aid of British and arrested Sơn Ngọc Than who sided with Vietnamese to resist the French. He was exiled to France to remain for six years.

After the French return in October 1945, Pach Chhoeun fled Phnom Penh to became affiliated with Khmer Issarak ("Khmer Freedom Fighters"). The portion of Democratic Party that were drawn to the ideas affiliated to early 1940s of Nagara Vatta. Khmer Issarak worked with the Viet Minh against the French. However the group collapsed in May 1946 after the French military reclaimed the Cambodian-Vietnam border in the lower Cambodia Khmer Krom region. Pach Chhoeun surrendered and was imprisoned by the French and was eventually exiled to France from 1947 to 1950

=== 1950-1952 ===
Pach Chhoeun was pardoned by the French President in 1950 and returned to Cambodia to work and campaign for the Democratic Party which won a majority in 1951. Pach Chhoeun was appointed Minister of State Information Director of the Royal Library in Phnom Penh by Huy Kanthoul's government and remained in that position to June 1952 at which time Norodom Sihanouk ousted the Democratic Party Leadership and took control of the Assembly assuming himself the role of Prime Minister.

=== 1952-1971 ===
Pach Chhoeun retired from political life in 1952 and worked in his business running a garage in Phnom Penh. In the late 1950's Pach Chhoeun became Curator of the National Library.
