= So Phim =

Cambodian military personnel

- សោ ភឹម
- Born: So Vanna (សូ វណ្ណា); 1925; Svay Rieng province, Cambodia, French Indochina
- Died: 3 June 1978 (aged 47–48); Kampong Cham province, Democratic Kampuchea
- Occupations: Khmer Rouge leader, purged by the Khmer Rouge

So Phim (Khmer: សោ ភឹម, né So Vanna សូ វណ្ណា) was a leader of the Khmer Issarak movement, the third-rank official of the Permanent Bureau and of the Military Bureau of the Central Committee of the Communist Party of Kampuchea, deputy head of the People's National Liberation Armed Forces of Kampuchea, and secretary of East Zone of the Democratic Kampuchea of the Khmer Rouge, until he refused to carry out the Cambodian genocide designed by Pol Pot and his comrades, a refusal that led to his own suicide in June 1978.

== Biography ==
=== A young Cambodian peasant fighting for Independence ===
So Phim was born in 1925 as the son of a modest peasant, in a hamlet in the province of Svay Rieng, Cambodia. He was a "round-faced stocky man, about 1.8 meters tall, with dark brown skin and straight black hair." He was considered to be quite rude and could, in a fit of anger, threaten his colleagues with his gun.

So Phim, after a brief period in the colonial army, joined the United Issarak Front in the fight against French protectorate of Cambodia with close ties to the Vietnamese communists and Viet Minh. He joined the Indochinese Communist Party in 1951 under the revolutionary name of So Vanna. In May 1952, bands in Prey Veng were combining into a Mobile Unit and under the leadership of So Phim they took the name of Achar Hem Chieu Unit, the monk who had led the 1942 Umbrella uprising against the French colonization. Following the signing of the Geneva Accords in July 1954, he was forced, like a thousand other executives, into exile in Hanoi.

=== Climbing up the ladder of the Communist revolution ===
So Phim became a member of the Communist Party of Kampuchea in 1955. He climbed the ranks to become a "trial" member of the Party's Central Committee at the end of the decade. He was raised to the rank of “full right” member of the Central Committee of the Communist Party of Kampuchea in 1966, and he was appointed by Pol Pot as deputy to the political department of the People's National Liberation Armed Forces of Kampuchea and secretary of the Eastern Zone which he led until 1975 alongside Mit Phuong (after Seng Hong) and Suas Nau who was the secretary of Region 24. In 1967, he took part in the Samlaut Uprising infiltrating the town of Kandol Chrum, killing a former district chief, and wounding another government agent. In December 1974, he signed a decree ordering a brutal crackdown in the province of Kampong Cham against a rebellion in two Cham villages, which was the first repression of the sort against the Muslim population of Cambodia.

=== Falling from favor in the eyes of Pol Pot ===
Shortly after the fall of Phnom Penh in April 1975, tensions began to arise between the men of Ta Mok and those of So Phim. Cadres imprisoned in the S-21 prison of Tuol Sleng often accused So Phim of being another traitor, inasmuch as he refused the ethnic cleansing based on tenets of Khmer racial purity. Nuon Chea also defended So Phim against those who accused him of secretly selling Cambodian rice to the Vietnamese.

He was "elected" first vice-president of the state praesidium on 11 April 1976 after Khieu Samphan replaced Sihanouk as head of state. However, it was merely a nominal position.

So Phim and Pol Pot's protege, Seng Hong, then in charge of the troops in the Zone, then came into conflict. Contrary to Seng Hong, So Phim was reluctant to resort to so much violence and questions the validity of the increasingly anti-Vietnamese policy pursued by the Angkar. From May to August 1976, So Phim went to China supposedly for medical treatment. During that time, his power structures in the East Zone were dismantled by the Central Bureau.

Despite everything, the number 3 of the Military Bureau of the Permanent Bureau of the Communist Party of Kampuchea Central Committee signed the order to attack Vietnam in early 1977. In early December 1977, Chinese Maoist Minister Chen Yonggui came to visit the East of Cambodia and insisted that the Khmer should also Learn from Dazhai in agriculture as he also inspected the "southern front" of China's ongoing battle with Vietnam. Removed from power despite his good and loyal service, So Phim founded a dissident organization in November called Authentic Revolutionary Forces of Kampuchea.

=== Trapped by the Khmer Rouge ===
On 23 May 1978, So Phim intervened to save the life of Heng Samrin who had been taken under custody at S-21 by Ke Pauk. So Phim summoned Heng Samrin to Suong and he sent him to Prey Veng in his capacity as deputy chief of the zone. Thereafter, So Phim, who was accused to have planned a coup against Pol Pot, was invited to a meeting by Pauk. Realizing that it was a trap, he ended his own life on 3 June 1978 not far from the village of Prek Pra, on the road linking the districts of Srei Santhor and Pea Reang District. Thus, he avoided being tortured like Khoy Thoun, another member of the Bureau, who was in charge of Phnom Penh, and who was similarly considered too moderate. His wife and children were captured and massacred as they prepared his body for the Buddhist funerary rites.

== Legacy ==
=== Repression of the Cham under the Khmer rouge ===
So Phim was secretary of the East Zone of Democratic Kampuchea, the zone which had the largest share of the Muslim Cham population in Cambodia. Thus, his responsibility in the persecution of this religious minority by the atheistic regime of Democratic Kampuchea has drawn attention. While he signed the first order which specifically targeted two Cham communities in Krouch Chhmar District, he was also considered by some to have resisted the policies of ethnic cleansing designed by the Angkar.

=== Resistance against the Cambodian genocide ===
So Phim is one of the examples of resistance against the policies of Pol Pot, which were rather rare as death was its certain consequence. His disappearance was to be followed by a vast purge within the East Zone which made up 100,000 victims, both among the grassroots and within the local apparatus formerly commanded by So Phim.

=== Inspiring a Resistance in exile ===
So Phim's disappearance also encouraged the escape of younger Cambodians who feared the madness of the Cambodian genocide would also come after them. Future Prime Minister Hun Sen and future Minister of the Interior Sar Kheng were among the younger generation who approved the rejection of exterminations by So Phim, and who decided to flee to Vietnam. Realizing that they would never overthrow Pol Pot on their own power, the Khmer rouge defectors started to train new cadres with Vietnamese support at a school in Thủ Đức. They led a resistance against the Khmer Rouge from abroad, until they defeated them in 1979 with the support of the Vietnamese army.
