= Khmer National Liberation Committee =

Khmer National Liberation Committee Kana Kamathikar Khmer Sang Cheat
- Flag used by KNLC commander Ouch Nilpich after 1953. This flag, representing three towers of Angkor Wat, was later adopted by the Khmer Rouge.
- President (1948-9): Dap Chhuon
- President (1949-53): Leav Keo Moni
- Supreme Army Chief (1949-52): Prince Norodom Chantaraingsey
- Founded: 1948
- Dissolved: 1953-4
- Merged into: United Issarak Front
- Headquarters: North-western Cambodia
- Newspaper: L'Indépendance, Ekareach
- Ideology: Khmer nationalism

The Khmer People's Liberation Committee (Khmer: Kana Cheat Mouta Keaha Mocchim Nokor Khmer; French: Comité de libération du peuple khmer) was a Cambodian anticolonial movement, formed by elements of the Khmer Issarak on 1 February 1948. It was later renamed the Khmer National Liberation Committee.

The Liberation Committee was an attempt to coordinate the efforts of the existing Issarak armed bands, some of which were sponsored by Thailand, some of which were leftist, and others of which were little more than bandit groups, to fight French colonial forces.

== Composition ==
The Committee and its "armed forces" were led by Dap Chhuon, a deserter from the colonial army who had built up a militia with Thai backing. Other leading figures of the Committee included Hong Chhun, a former district official from Battambang; Mey Pho, a former palace clerk who was later to join the Indochinese Communist Party; Sieu Heng, a practitioner of traditional medicine from Battambang; Leav Keo Moni, an ex-bamboo seller and like Heng a leftist sympathiser; Kao Tak, an Issarak and previously a stock merchant from Siem Reap; Mao Sarouth, who became the committee's political commissar, and Hem Savang, its representative for foreign affairs. Savang, along with Mey Pho, had as a student previously taken part in a 1945 coup attempt against King Norodom Sihanouk in an attempt to secure Cambodian independence.

The armed forces of the Committee numbered around 800 at the time of formation, with Chhuon's men being the largest element. The committee also published two newspapers, L'Indépendance (in French) and Ekareach (in Khmer). It had cooperation with the Vietnamese leftists and nationalists of the Viet Minh, though one prominent Issarak leader, Prince Norodom Chantaraingsey (a rebellious member of the Cambodian royal family) refused to join due to the committee's Viet Minh links.

== Divisions between the KPLC and the Viet Minh ==
By the end of 1948 the Khmer resistance movements had divided the country between them into four military zones: Dap Chhuon was awarded the North-West. The three other zones were led by rebel leaders who had joined the Indochinese Communist Party. Chhoun became increasingly isolated as a non-communist within the KPLC: within his own leadership, four Committee members either had joined the ICP, or were about to join it. This development caused the KPLC to distance itself from the communist-led Viet Minh and spurred changes in the KPLC leadership.

== Reorganisation as the KNLC ==
In 1949 the KPLC was renamed Khmer National Liberation Committee (in Khmer: Kana Kamathikar Khmer Sang Cheat, French: Comité National Khmer de Libération). When a new Committee was elected in January 1949, the number of identified leftists was reduced to three, Mey Pho (Information Branch), Leav Keo Moni (Economy Branch) and Moun (Treasury Branch). During the first half of 1949, the organisation was torn apart by opposition to Chhuon's authoritarian leadership style. Leav Keo Moni broke away, taking a few hundred fighters with him, while Kao Tak left in April 1949, along with 400 fighters, though both would later return to the KNLC.

In July Chhuon had Mao Sarouth and Hem Savang assassinated: soon thereafter he was removed from the KNLC leadership. Later in July, Poc Khun became the new leader of the organisation. At the same time Prince Chantaraingsey finally joined the KNLC and became its "Supreme Army Chief". Dap Chhoun, however, was to surrender to the French authorities in September 1949, along with 300 fighters: he was rewarded with an official post by the colonial authorities.

== The KNLC and the UIF ==
The flag of the UIF; this flag was also occasionally used by the KNLC in the period prior to 1953.

1950 saw the formation of Son Ngoc Minh's United Issarak Front (UIF), a rival Issarak committee based in the east of Cambodia and organised with heavy Viet Minh involvement.

In early 1950 Poc Khun was removed as the KNLC leader, after being accused of having embezzled 600,000 piastres intended for arms purchases in Bangkok. On 19 April, the leftist Leav Keo Moni was elected the new president of KNLC; Kao Tak became the organisation's 'President of National Defense'. In October 1950, a joint KNLC and United Issarak Front delegation travelled to southern Vietnam for talks with the Viet Minh.

In February 1951, a KNLC meeting was held in Battambang, at which Leav Keo Moni was re-elected KNLC president. Kao Tak was removed from his post, accused of excesses against the local population committed under his command. This development likely reflected simmering political differences between Leav Keo Moni and Kao Tak, as the latter opposed rapprochement with the Viet Minh. Soon after the Battambang meeting, Kao Tak attempted to kill Leav Keo Moni in an ambush on 13 February, after which the KNLC issued a death sentence on Kao Tak (who nevertheless managed to escape).

In April, the three KNLC delegates to Vietnam returned to Cambodia, and cooperation between KNLC and UIF was strengthened. On August 20, 1951, a further KNLC congress was re-elected Leav Keo Moni as the KNLC president. In the meantime, former member Kao Tak had again reorganized his forces, with around 300 fighters under his command by the end of 1951. However, the KNLC forces soon attacked and dispersed them: Kao Tak's group retaliated by killing 15 civilians accused of aiding the KNLC.

By this time the KNLC armed forces consisted of three separate bands, each functioning in a somewhat autonomous fashion. Two bands, led by Ouch Nilpich and Achar Tumsok, operated in the north of the country. The third, led by Thim Tralay, operated south of Battambang. Tralay's band was in charge of relations with Viet Minh, and operated jointly with Viet Minh forces in the area.

== Developments after 1952 ==
In 1952, Prince Chantaraingsey - who had continued to distance himself from the Vietnamese and leftist elements of the resistance - left the KNLC, along with around 700-1000 followers, aligned with the government, and began fighting Viet Minh and Khmer rebels. However, the KNLC were also contacted by republican nationalist Son Ngoc Thanh, who had set up his own armed resistance unit, based on a nucleus of around 80 students, officials and army deserters, in the vicinity of Siem Reap. Thanh's support in Cambodia was rooted largely in the urban educated classes and the more radical wing of the Democratic Party, but he nevertheless sent messages to Chantaraingsey, Kao Tak and others in an attempt to build support amongst the rural resistance: Kao Tak was to amalgamate his forces with those of Thanh, creating a band of 500 guerrillas.

Throughout 1952 and 1953, Leav Keo Moni continued his policy of cooperation with the UIF, leading to the effective amalgamation of the KNLC and UIF forces. Those elements of the KNLC who (like Kao Tak and Chantaraingsey) had been unhappy with Vietnamese and Communist collaboration were marginalised, and Nilpich and Tumsok were to break away, claiming that the joint efforts of Moni and the UIF were a cover for Vietnamese domination of Cambodia.

Both the Communist and non-Communist resistance groups continued to have periodic contact with Thanh, whose moves to gain overall leadership of the Issarak movement ultimately proved fruitless. It has been suggested that the divisions in the Cambodian resistance movement in this period, which remained split between the UIF, the KNLC, the Thanh faction and other smaller groups, may have been at least partly the work of French agents, who attempted to sow as much discord in the movement as possible.

Most of the armed guerrilla groups in Cambodia, with the notable exception of some followers of Thanh, were to lay down their arms in the wake of the political settlement imposed by the 1954 Geneva Conference.
