= Japanese occupation of Cambodia =

World War II occupation, 1941–1945

The Japanese occupation of Cambodia (Khmer: ការត្រួតត្រារបស់ជប៉ុននៅកម្ពុជា) was the period of Cambodian history during World War II when the Kingdom of Cambodia was occupied by the Japanese. Vichy France, which was a client state of Germany, nominally maintained the French protectorate over Cambodia and other parts of Indochina during most of the Japanese occupation. This territory of Cambodia was reduced, by concessions to Thailand after the Franco-Thai War, so that it did not include Stung Treng Province, Battambang Province, and Siem Reap Province.

The Japanese occupation in Cambodia lasted from 1941 to 1945 and, in general, the Cambodian population escaped the brutalities inflicted on civilians by the Japanese occupiers in other countries of Southeast Asia. After the nominal French Indochina colonial government was overthrown in 1945, Cambodia became a pro-Tokyo puppet state until the surrender of Japan.

== Historical background ==
The 1940–41 Franco-Thai War left the French Indochinese colonial authorities in a position of weakness. The Vichy government signed an agreement with Japan to allow the Japanese military transit through French Indochina and to station troops in Northern Vietnam up to a limit of 25,000 men.

Meanwhile, the Thai government, under the pro-Japanese leadership of Field Marshal Plaek Phibunsongkhram, and strengthened by virtue of its treaty of friendship with Japan, took advantage of the weakened position of France, and invaded Cambodia's western provinces to which it had historic claims. Following this invasion, Tokyo hosted the signature of a treaty in March 1941 that formally compelled the French to relinquish the provinces of Battambang, Siem Reap, Koh Kong as well as a narrow extension of land between the 15th parallel and the Dangrek Mountains in Stung Treng Province.

As a result, Cambodia had lost almost half a million citizens and one-third of its former surface area to Thailand.

== Japanese occupation ==
In August 1941, the Imperial Japanese Army entered the French protectorate of Cambodia and established a garrison that numbered 8,000 troops. Despite their military presence, the Japanese authorities allowed the cooperating Vichy French colonial officials to remain at their administrative posts.

On 20 July 1942, there was a major anti-French demonstration in Phnom Penh after a prominent monk, Hem Chieu, was arrested for allegedly preaching seditious sermons to the colonial militia. The French authorities arrested the demonstration's leader, Pach Chhoeun, and exiled him to the prison island of Con Son. Pach Chhoen was a respected Cambodian intellectual, associated with the Buddhist Institute and founder of Nagaravatta, the first overtly political newspaper in the Khmer language in 1936, along with Sim Var.

=== Collaborationist Kingdom of Kampuchea ===
On 9 March 1945, during the closing stages of the war, Japan overthrew the French rule in Indochina. The French colonial administrators were relieved of their positions, and French military forces were ordered to disarm. The aim was to revive the flagging support of local populations for Tokyo's war effort by encouraging indigenous rulers to proclaim independence.

On 13 March, the young King Norodom Sihanouk proclaimed an independent Kingdom of Kampuchea (While changing the official name of the country in French from Cambodge to Kampuchea) following a formal request by the Japanese. Shortly thereafter the Japanese government nominally ratified the independence of Cambodia and established a consulate in Phnom Penh. Sihanouk's decree did away with previous French-Cambodian treaties and he pledged his newly independent country's cooperation and alliance with Japan.

The new government did away with the romanisation of the Khmer language that the French colonial administration was beginning to enforce and officially reinstated the Khmer script. This measure taken by the short-lived governmental authority would be popular and long-lasting, for since then no government in Cambodia has tried to romanise the Khmer language again. Other changes included the reinstating of the Buddhist lunar calendar.

Norodom Sihanouk initially also served as Prime Minister from 18 March 1945. However, Son Ngoc Thanh, another of the men behind Nagaravatta who had fled to Japan following the 1942 anti-French demonstrations, had returned in April 1945 to serve as foreign minister. Son Ngoc Thanh would take over the position of prime minister following the surrender of Japan, serving until French restoration in October 1945.

The Japanese occupation of Cambodia ended with the official surrender of Japan in August 1945. After Allied military units entered Cambodia, the Japanese military forces present in the country were disarmed and repatriated. The French were able to reimpose the colonial administration in Phnom Penh in October the same year. After arresting Son Ngoc Thanh for collaboration with the Japanese on 12 October, the French colonial authorities exiled him to France, where he lived under house arrest. Some of his supporters went underground and escaped to Thai-controlled northwestern Cambodia, where they were eventually to join forces in a pro-independence group, the Khmer Issarak. This anti-French, politically heterogeneous nationalist movement was organised with Thai backing, but would later split into factions.

== See also ==
- Colonial Cambodia
- Phra Tabong Province
- Phibunsongkhram Province
- Nakhon Champassak Province
- Military history of Cambodia
- Indochina Expeditionary Army
- Japanese coup d'état in French Indochina
- Thailand in World War II
