= Hem Chieu =

- ហែម ចៀវ
- Born: 1898; Kandal Province, Cambodia, French Indochina
- Died: 1943 (aged 44–45); Côn Sơn Island, Cochinchina, French Indochina
- Occupations: Monk, professor
- Known for: Resistance to French colonization

Hem Chieu (Khmer: ហែម ចៀវ; 1898 - 1943) was a Cambodian Buddhist monk and a prominent figure in the development of Khmer nationalism.

Chieu was a professor at the Higher School of Pali in Phnom Penh, and strongly objected to attempts by the French colonial authorities, beginning in the late 1930s, to romanize the Khmer writing system. Although the reforms were not intended to be applied to religious texts, he began to make vocal criticisms of the French administration. He became associated with two nationalist activists, Son Ngoc Thanh and Pach Chheoun, editor and founder of a pro-independence Khmer-language newspaper, Nagaravatta. The French authorities believed that Thanh, Chieu and Chheoun, with Japanese backing, were attempting to recruit followers for a bid for independence from the French.

== Arrest ==
On July 18, 1942, the French authorities moved to arrest Chieu and an associate, Nuon Dong. Chieu was alleged to have preached anti-French sermons to Khmer troops in the colonial militia in preparation of the revolt; the manner of his arrest deeply offended many other members of the sangha.

== Reaction to Arrest ==
A large demonstration against the arrests, in which many monks took part, was organised two days later in Phnom Penh by Thanh and Chhoeun. Chhoeun marched at the head of the demonstrators, and several monks who would later take an active role in Cambodian politics, such as later Communist activists Achar Mean (Son Ngoc Minh) and Achar Sok (Tou Samouth) were present. The demonstration was broken up violently by the French, and Chhoeun was arrested and sentenced to death (later commuted to life imprisonment).

== Death ==
Hem Chieu, "still preaching" according to an observer, was also sentenced to death by a military tribunal, later commuted to life imprisonment with hard labour. He died in the notorious Côn Sơn Island prison in October 1943. While there he met several leaders of the Viet Minh, such as Phạm Văn Đồng and Tôn Đức Thắng, who afterwards related that Hem Chieu's heroic conduct in the prison led to sanctions which directly contributed to his illness and death.

Chieu soon came to be regarded as a martyr by leftist Cambodian nationalists and insurgents of the United Issarak Front. In 1950, a political school named after Hem Chieu was established in the southwest of the county and an armed guerrilla unit named itself after him. He was also, however, honoured as a national hero by the anticommunist Khmer Republic.
