= Poc Khun =

Cambodian-Thai politician

Phra Phiset Phanit
- พระพิเศษพานิช ប៉ុក គុណ

Leader of Khmer Issarak
- In office 1940–1946

Member of Thai Parliament
- In office 1946–1946
- Monarch: Ananda Mahidol
- Prime Minister: Khuang Aphaiwong
- Constituency: Phra Tabong

Chairman of Khmer National Liberation Committee
- In office July 1949 – April 1950
- Preceded by: Dap Chhuon
- Succeeded by: Leav Keo Moni

Personal details
- Spouse: Cha-on Aphaiwong
- Profession: Politician

Phra Phiset Phanit (Thai: พระพิเศษพานิช), also known as Poc Khun (Khmer: ប៉ុក គុណ) or Wibun Pokmontri (Thai: วิบูล ปกมนตรี), was a member of the Aphaiwong branch of the Cambodian royal family, the brother-in-law of Prime Minister Khuang Aphaiwong of Thailand, and the organizer and leader of the first Khmer Issarak movement founded in 1940 to resist French colonial power in Cambodia.

After the Khmer Issarak movement disintegrated due to internal political differences, Phiset was elected to represent Battambang (Phra Tabong) in the Thai parliament during the administration of his brother-in-law. After Khuang resigned as Prime Minister and Thailand again ceded the western Cambodian provinces back to French Indochina, Phiset and former Khmer Issarak members formed the Khmer National Liberation Committee (KNLC) in 1948 to further armed resistance against French rule of Cambodia. The KNLC attempted to distance itself from the Indochinese Communist Party and purge other leftists from within its own ranks paving the way for Phiset to become chairman in 1949. However, he was removed from that position less than a year later after being accused of misappropriating money designating for purchasing weapons.
