= Norodom Chantaraingsey =

Cambodian royal and nationalist

- នរោត្ដម ចន្ទរង្សី
- Norodom Chantaraingsey in military uniform
- Born: 1924 or 1926; Phnom Penh, Cambodia
- Died: 1975 or 1976
- Relatives: House of Norodom
- Military career
- Allegiance: Khmer Issarak; Khmer National Liberation Committee; Khmer Republic (from 1970)
- Branch: Khmer Issarak; Khmer National Liberation Committee; Khmer National Armed Forces (from 1970)
- Service years: 1940’s – 1975/1976
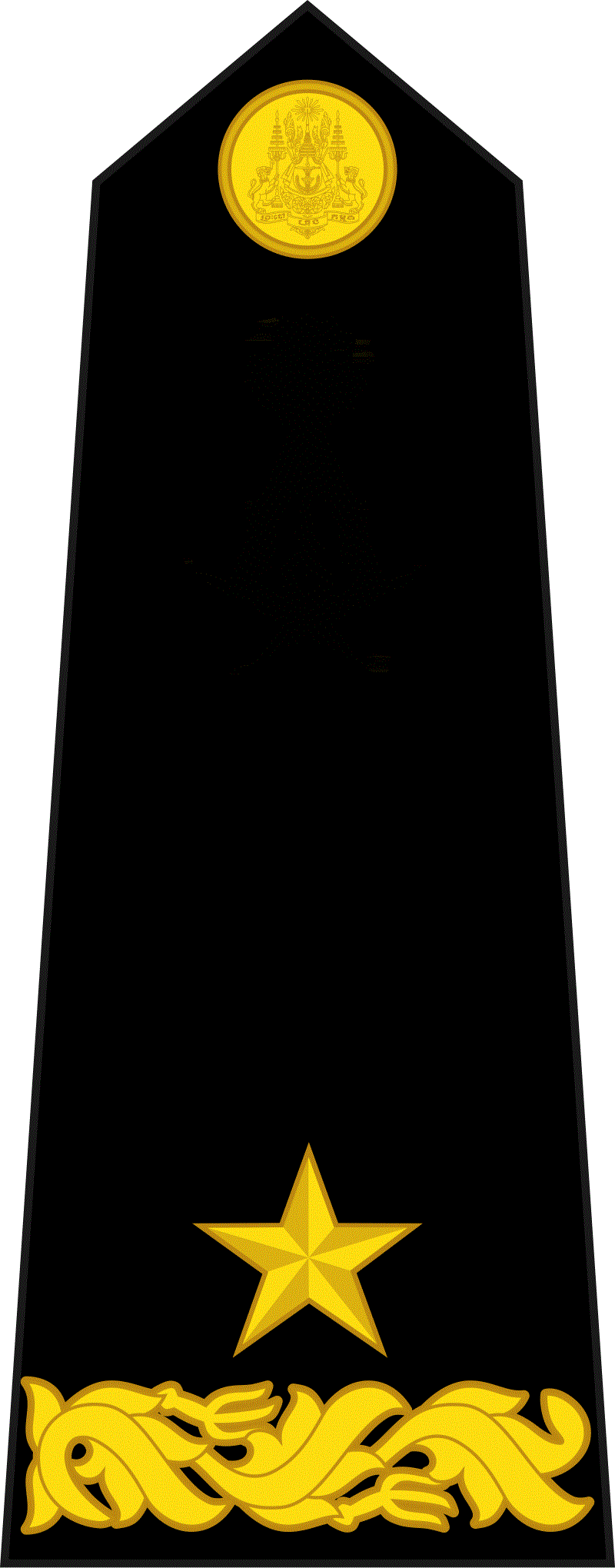
- Rank: Brigadier general
- Commands: 13th Brigade (FANK), Commander Military Region II (FANK), Lieutenant Governor of Kirirom Province.
- Known for: Prince of the Cambodian royal family, Leader of non-communist Khmer Issarak
- Conflicts: World War II; First Indochina War; Cambodian Civil War

Prince Norodom Chantaraingsey (Khmer: នរោត្ដម ចន្ទរង្សី, 1924 or 1926 – c. 1976) was a member of the Cambodian royal family and a Cambodian nationalist. Initially a leader of the guerrilla resistance against the colonial French, he went on to become a prominent general in the Khmer National Armed Forces (FANK) during the Cambodian Civil War, as well as a businessman and occasional writer.

Chantaraingsey is thought to have been killed fighting the Khmer Rouge in either 1975 or 1976. However, his exact date of death remains unknown.

== Biography ==
=== Colonial Cambodia and First Indochina War ===
Prince Norodom Chantaraingsey, a grandson of Norodom of Cambodia and cousin of King Norodom Suramarit, was born in 1926 in Phnom Penh. He was younger than Suramarit's son Sihanouk. He began his military career during World War II and the Japanese occupation of Cambodia, serving in the Japanese-sponsored anti-French forces under Son Ngoc Thanh. After the war's end and the resumption of colonial rule, Chantaraingsey escaped to Thailand and became one of the most prominent non-communist leaders of the Khmer Issarak, leading armed resistance in the provinces of Kompong Speu and Kompong Thom at the head of a large private militia. In 1949 he joined the Khmer National Liberation Committee, becoming its Supreme Army Chief, then from 1951 he associated himself with the forces of Son Ngoc Thanh in Siem Reap, though he continued to operate as a regional warlord, maintaining his own troops.

Pol Pot described Chantaraingsey, who at various times fought against the French, the Viet Minh, and Khmer forces aligned with them, as essentially "feudal" in outlook and his men as little more than bandits. The communists had at one point considered making Chantaraingsey their preferred candidate as king instead of Sihanouk, but he proved too wary of the Vietnamese influence on the communist cadres.

Despite his personal rivalry with Sihanouk and his nominally republican stance, Chantaraingsey aligned with the government after Cambodia achieved independence under Sihanouk's regime. However, after being discovered to be conspiring, along with other former members of the Issarak, to stage a coup against Sihanouk, Chantaraingsey was stripped of his military rank and royal title. After three years' imprisonment, during which he occupied himself by writing a number of well-received romantic novels, Chantaraingsey was released and went on to accrue a large personal fortune through a variety of business ventures, notably after Sihanouk appointed him director of the state-run casino in the capital.

=== Career with the Khmer National Armed Forces ===
After the successful 1970 coup against Sihanouk, Lon Nol appointed Chantaraingsey commander of FANK's 13th Brigade (known as the "Tiger Brigade", Chantaraingesey having been born in the Year of the Tiger) with the rank of Brigadier-General. He became military governor of the Kampong Speu province, and perhaps FANK's most effective commander during the subsequent civil war. As in his Issarak years, Chantaraingsey ran the province as essentially a personal fiefdom; apart from running a successful pacification program, his purchases of American arms from neighbouring generals made his forces ultimately too powerful for Lon Nol to directly challenge. Unlike many FANK commanders, he ensured his men were well-treated and fed and regularly paid, and was popular as a result. Later in 1973, Der Spiegel was to report that Chantaraingsey, using pseudo-Maoist slogans, was employing his soldiers to build roads and irrigation canals for local farmers, and in return received a proportion of their produce.

After the fall of Phnom Penh to the Khmer Rouge on April 17, 1975, Chantaraingsey is thought to have retreated with his men to the area around the former hill station of Kirirom, where he had considerable support from the local peasantry. Some accounts state he was killed in this area in May while trying to break out to the Thai border, but he was reported to still be alive, and continuing resistance against the Khmer Rouge, in June 1975, at which point he was commanding some 2000 men in the Cardamom Mountains. Elements of FANK's 13th Brigade were in fact still fighting in this area as late as 1977. Well into 1976 rumours persisted, from refugees fleeing Cambodia, that troops under Chantaraingsey were resisting in the Cardamoms. The exact date of Chantaraingsey's death is still unknown; one report states he was killed later in 1975 near Battambang during a failed attempt to rescue his wife, who was being held by members of the Khmer Rouge, while other reports suggest he was killed while fighting from an APC in the Dâmrei Mountains in 1976.

In 1973, the poet and journalist James Fenton was invited by Chantaraingsey to a banquet lunch held on a battlefield; Fenton used the surreal experience in one of his most famous poems, Dead Soldiers, noting that Chantaraingsey's aide was a brother of Pol Pot.

== Personal life ==
Chantaraingsey was married to Sisowath Samanvoraphong, a daughter of King Sisowath Monivong. The personal name "Chantaraingsey" is derived from chant(r)a, "moon", and raingsey, "ray of light", from Pali Candaraṅsi.

== See also ==
- Cambodian Civil War
- First Indochina War
- Khmer National Armed Forces
- List of people who disappeared mysteriously: 1910–1990
