= Nguon Hong =

Cambodian guerrilla chief

Nguon Hong was a Cambodian Issarak guerrilla chief. Hong led a small group in Kompong Chhnang who has under Savang Vong's command. Around 1952, Nguon Hong and his group defected from Savang Vong, and joined Sơn Ngọc Thành's forces. However, Nguon Hong also aligned with the United Issarak Front chief in the area, Meas Vong. In this sense Nguon Hong represented an emerging phenomenon of the unity between nationalist (Thanh) and communist (UIF/Viet Minh) forces in the Cambodian anticolonial struggle at the time.

Kao Tak of UIF allocated 50 soldiers and 30 rifles to Nguon Hong. At the same time, a group who had defected from the non-communist Issarak band of Puth Chhay joined him. Subsequently, Nguon Hong could count of a force of 120 guerrillas.
