= Bangkok Plot =

1950s conspiracy to topple Norodom Sihanouk

Dap Chhuon Plot Bangkok Plot
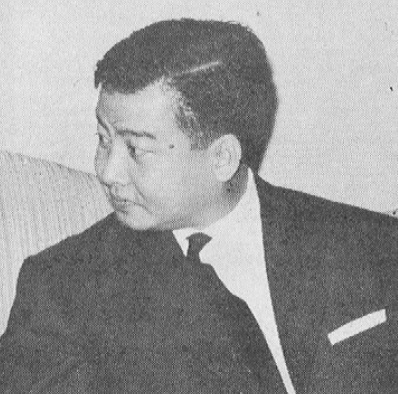
- Norodom Sihanouk in 1959
Date	21 February 1959
Location	Siem Reap, Cambodia
Result	Coup d'état unsuccessful

Belligerents
(Cambodia) House of Norodom; (Cambodia) Royal Cambodian Armed Forces loyalists (Cambodia); Popular Socialist Community (pro Sihanouk); Pro-Sihanouk partisans	(Cambodia) Khmer Serei; Khmer Republic; Supported by: Thailand Government; South Vietnamese Government; United States (allegedly)

Commanders and leaders
(Cambodia) Norodom Sihanouk	Dap Chhuon (executed); Slat Peou (executed); Sam Sary (MIA); CIA (allegedly)

Casualties and losses
Unknown	3+ (Dap Chhuon and Slat Peou Executed; Sam Sary Missing)

The Bangkok Plot, also known as the Dap Chhuon Plot, was a late 1950s international conspiracy to topple Prince Norodom Sihanouk of Cambodia. It was allegedly initiated by the right-wing politicians Sam Sary and Son Ngoc Thanh, the regional Cambodian warlord and governor Dap Chhuon, and the governments of Thailand and South Vietnam with possible involvement of US intelligence services. The Bangkok Plot and its politics still influence Cambodian politics.

== Plot ==
According to the account later given by Sihanouk, the coup was to be carried out by Thanh's Khmer Serai irregulars, largely from the Khmer Krom minority of southern Vietnam. The Khmer Serai were massed in the southern border areas. Chhuon, who had for a few years been a trusted associate of Sihanouk, was to start an uprising in the north-east. In early February 1959, Admiral Harry Felt, General Lawton Collins and Colonel Edward Lansdale all visited Chhuon's base in Siem Reap.

Sihanouk's intelligence services discovered details of the plot and on February 21, 1959, they dispatched a battalion of troops to arrest Chhuon. A US citizen and alleged CIA radio operator Victor Matsui was captured. Chhuon who had fled, was later apprehended, interrogated, and died "of injuries" in somewhat murky circumstances before he could be properly interviewed. Sihanouk later alleged that Defence Minister Lon Nol had Chhuon shot to prevent him from being implicated in the coup.

Sihanouk arranged for pictures of Chhuon's corpse to be posted on a main Phnom Penh thoroughfare. Of the other main plotters, Sary disappeared in 1962, and Thanh went on to have involvement in Lon Nol's post-1970 government before leaving for Vietnam. Chhuon's brother Slat Peou, a member of Sihanouk's delegation at the United Nations and a friend of Matsui, was executed for treason.

Sihanouk, an amateur film director, later used the plot as the basis for his film Ombre sur Angkor ("Shadow over Angkor") from 1968. He regarded it as conclusive evidence that the US intended to destabilise his regime, which had established relations with Communist China.

== See also ==
- 2000 Cambodian coup d'état attempt
- Dap Chhuon Affair
- Dap Chhuon
- Norodom Sihanouk

== Literature ==
- William J. Rust (2016). Eisenhower & Cambodia: Diplomacy, Covert Action, and the Origins of the Second Indochina War. University Press of Kentucky. ISBN 9780813167428.
