= Dap Chhuon =

Cambodian warlord

- ដាប ឈួន
- Born: 1912; Siem Reap, Cambodia, French Indochina
- Died: 21 February 1959 (aged 46–47); Siem Reap, Cambodia
- Military career
- Allegiance: Khmer Issarak (1945-1949); France (1940-1943; 1949-1954); Kingdom of Cambodia (1949-1957)
- Branch: Army
- Service years: 1940-1959
- Rank: General
- Conflicts: Dap Chhuon Plot

Governor of Siem Reap province
- In office 1954–1959

Minister of Internal Security
- In office 1954–1957

Dap Chhuon (Khmer: ដាប ឈួន), also known as Chuan Khemphet (Thai: ชวน เข็มเพชร), Khem Phet (Thai: เข็ม เพชร), Chhuon Mochulpech or Chhuon Mchoul Pich (Khmer: ឈួន ម្ជុលពេជ្រ) (1912–1959) was a right-wing Cambodian nationalist, guerrilla leader, regional warlord, and general.

Chhuon was born in Siem Reap and grew up in Prey Veng, joining the French militia in which he rose to the rank of sergeant. In the Franco-Thai War he was captured by – or deserted to – Thai forces, and in 1943 again deserted from the Cambodian National Guard at Bang Mealas, allegedly in possession of his men's pay. By the mid-1940s, Chhuon was backed by the Thai government in organising anti-French guerrilla bands in the area of Siem Reap.

In August 1946 a disparate group of activists led by Chhuon, Prince Norodom Chantaraingsey and the leftist Son Ngoc Minh fought French troops in Siem Reap over the course of several days. Chhuon went on to become a leader of the Khmer People's Liberation Committee, a grouping of various regional elements of the Khmer Issarak resistance. However, in late 1949 he and his men went over to the French, who rewarded him with virtual control of parts of northern Cambodia and an official military post as commander of the "Franco-Khmer Corps".

Chhuon had a reputation for extreme brutality which had rapidly alienated the other Issarak leaders, and ruled effectively by personal decree. He was held in awe by the local peasantry. They credited him with powers of invulnerability, reinforced by his habit of demonstrating feats of strength and his "daunting" appearance, being cadaverously thin with "unblinking, deep-set eyes".

By 1954 and Cambodian independence, Chhuon had again switched allegiance, this time to the new government of Norodom Sihanouk; Sihanouk even took him to the Geneva Conference in order to demonstrate that he had Issarak support. In October 1954, in the run-up to the 1955 elections, Chhuon formed an alliance between his 'Victorious North-East' political party and several other small parties (including Lon Nol's Khmer Renovation party) which proclaimed themselves as monarchist, traditionalist and rightist. This rightist alliance formed the basis of Sihanouk's Sangkum Reastr Niyum political organisation. During the 1955 elections, Chhuon's militia were routinely used to break up rallies of Sangkum opponents and intimidate voters.

Chhuon became Sihanouk's Internal Security Minister, and the Governor of Siem Reap Province. Although he had begun his career fighting alongside the Viet Minh, Chhuon's increasingly strident anti-communism caused him to be suggested by Robert McClintock, the US Ambassador to Cambodia between 1954 and 1956, to be cultivated as a possible replacement for Sihanouk. His disagreements with Sihanouk over the latter's courting of communist China led to him being dropped from the cabinet in 1957, however, and he began to openly break with Sihanouk's regime.

In 1959 Chhuon was exposed in an allegedly Central Intelligence Agency-funded coup plot (the "Dap Chhuon Plot" or Bangkok Plot). Spies reported to Sihanouk that Dap Chhuon planned, with help from Thailand, to assassinate him, overthrow the monarchy and establish an anti-Communist republic. Sihanouk sent a battalion to Siem Reap with orders to get Dap Chhuon.

According to one account, Chhuon was surprised at his home by Lon Nol's security forces and, despite escaping clad only in an under-sarong, he was quickly recaptured and killed. Sihanouk was later to claim that Lon Nol had secretly ordered the killing of Chhuon in order to avoid being implicated in the coup himself.

One of Chhuon's brothers, Kem Srey, was closely associated with him in his political activities; another brother, Kem Penh, was an international arms dealer. A half-brother, Slat Peou (1929–60), an embassy worker and later the Sangkum delegate for Siem Reap, was executed for his involvement in the 1959 plot.
