= Nguon =

Nguon may be,

- Nguon event
- Nguồn language
- Nguon Hong
- Nguon Nhel (1942-2021), Cambodian politician
- Nguon Kang
