= Pác Bó =

Village in Vietnam

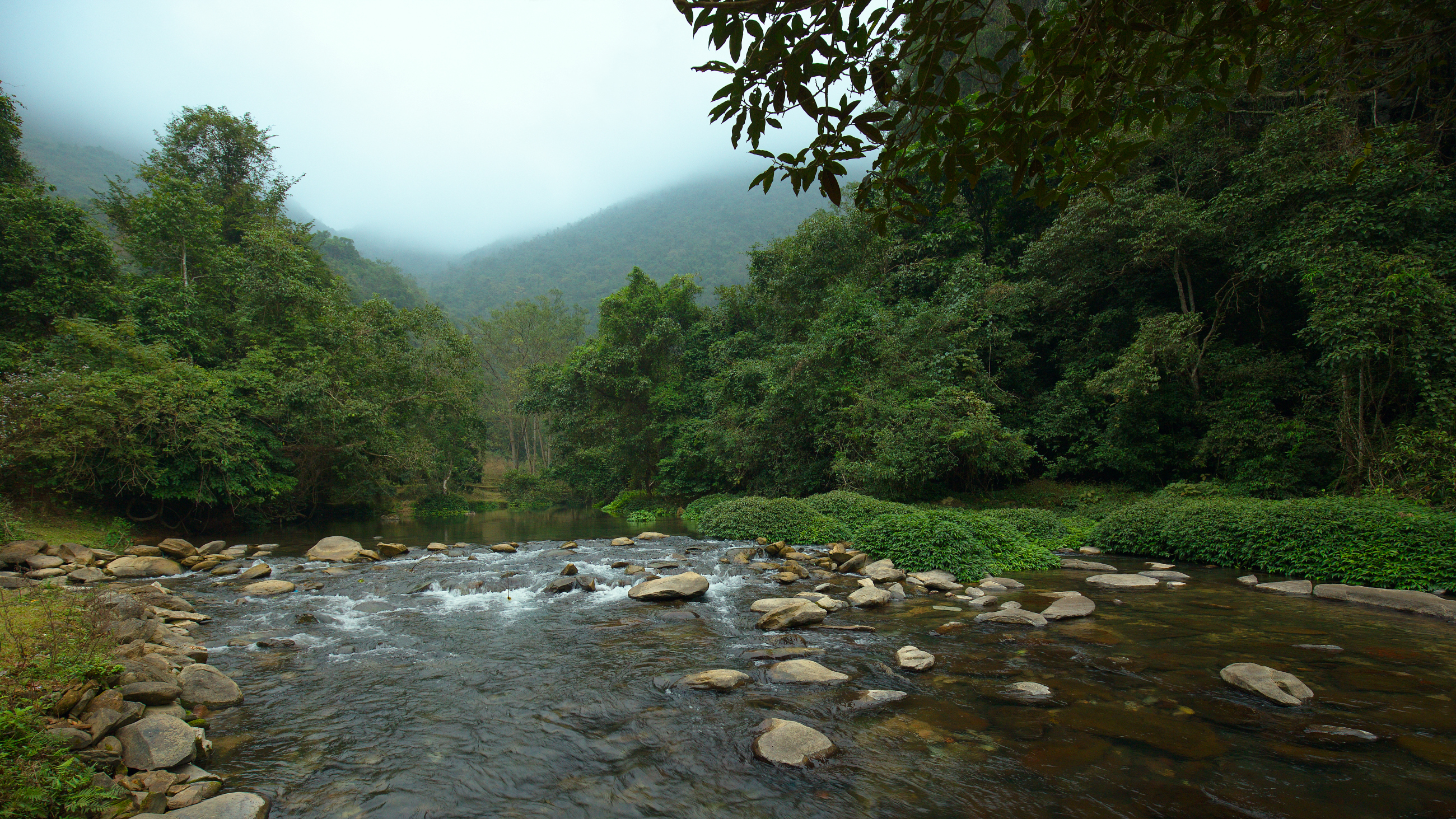
- The Lê Nin stream

- Location within Vietnam
- Coordinates: 22°58′44″N 106°03′06″E

Pác Bó is a small village in Cao Bằng province, northern part of Vietnam, 3 km from the Chinese border.

"Pác Bó" in Tày language means “the beginning of the source”.

Near this village is a cave, Hang Cốc Bó (today often called Hang Pác Bó) in which Hồ Chí Minh lived for seven weeks, during February and March 1941, after returning from 30 years of exile. Consequently, it is now a tourist site. . This is where the VietMinh was founded.
