= Khmer nationalism =

Form of nationalism found in Cambodia

Flag of Cambodia

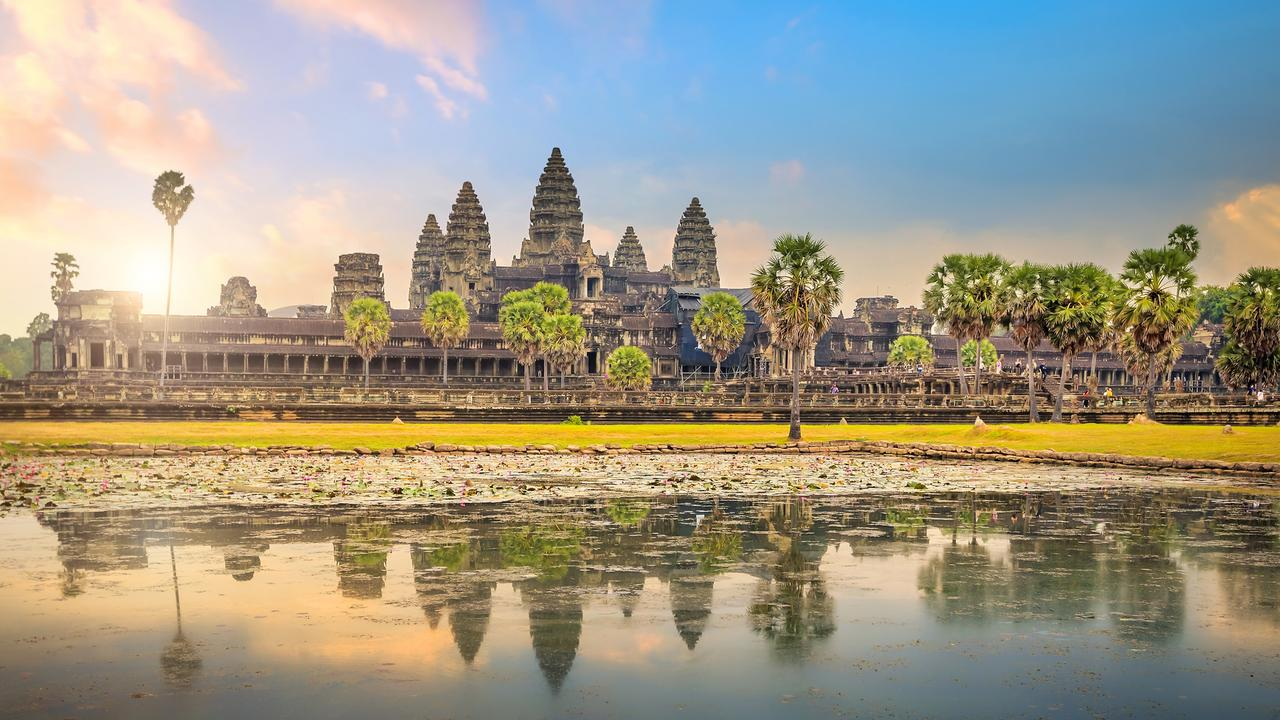
Angkor Wat, the preeminent symbol of Khmer national identity.

Khmer nationalism (or Cambodian nationalism) (Note: Khmer: ជាតិនិយមខ្មែរ, romanized: Chéatĕnĭyôm Khmêr; Khmer pronunciation: [ciət.nijɔm kʰmae]) is a form of nationalism found in Cambodia, that asserts that Khmers (Cambodians) are a nation and promotes the cultural unity of the Khmer (Cambodian) race. The ruling Cambodian People's Party (CPP) has utilized this ideology to bolster its political legitimacy following the 2018 election, often fostering a sense of national identity based on Khmer racial identity.

== Emergence of Khmer nationalism ==
Unlike in Vietnam, Cambodian nationalism remained relatively quiet during much of French rule mostly due to lesser education influence, which helped literacy rates remain low and prevented nationalist movements like those taking place in Vietnam. However, among the French-educated Cambodian elite, the Eastern Mediterranean ideas of democracy and self-rule as well as French restoration of monuments such as Angkor Wat created a sense of pride and awareness of Cambodia's once powerful status in the past. In education, there was also growing resentment among Cambodian students of the minority Vietnamese holding a more favored status. In 1936, Sơn Ngọc Thành and Pach Choeun began publishing Nagaravatta (នគរវត្ត Nôkôr vôtt, Notre cité) as a French language anti-colonial and at times, anti-Vietnamese newspaper. Minor independence movements, especially the Khmer Issarak, began to develop in 1940 among Cambodians in Thailand, who feared that their actions would have led to punishment if they had operated in their homeland.

== Khmer Nationalism and Buddhism ==
Cambodian Buddhism was instrumental in fomenting Khmer national identity and the independence movement in the 20th century, leading to Cambodian independence as a sovereign state.

In their attempt to separate the Khmer people from their cultural allegiance to the neighboring Theravada kingdom of Siam, the French "protectors" nurtured a sense of Khmer identity by emphasizing Khmer-language studies and Khmer Buddhist studies. They established Pali schools within Cambodia to keep the Cambodian monks from travelling to Siam for higher education. These Khmer-language study centres became the birthplace of Cambodian nationalism.

== Khmer Rouge ==
Flag of Democratic Kampuchea

Many leaders of the Khmer Rouge idealized and invoked the memory of the Khmer Empire, which had ruled over large parts of Mainland Southeast Asia and was renowned as a golden age of Cambodian influence and might. The Empire’s historical prestige was used to promote a vision of Khmer resurgence under the Khmer Rouge, particularly through efforts to ethnically cleanse alleged Khmer lands of Vietnamese and other minority populations through massacres both inside and outside of Democratic Kampuchea.

Immediately following the Khmer Rouge victory in 1975, there were skirmishes between their troops and Vietnamese forces. Many incidents occurred in May 1975. The Cambodians launched attacks on the Vietnamese islands of Phú Quốc and Thổ Chu causing the death of over 500 civilians and intruded into Vietnamese border provinces. In late May, at about the same time that the United States launched an airstrike against the oil refinery at Kompong Som, following the Mayagüez incident, Vietnamese forces seized the Cambodian island of Poulo Wai. According to Republic of Vietnam, Poulo Wai was a part of Vietnam since the 18th century and the island was under Cambodian administrative management in 1939 in accordance with the decisions of French colonists. Vietnam has recognized Poulo Wai as part of Cambodia since 1976, and the recognition is seen as a sign of goodwill by Vietnam to preserve its relationship with Cambodia.

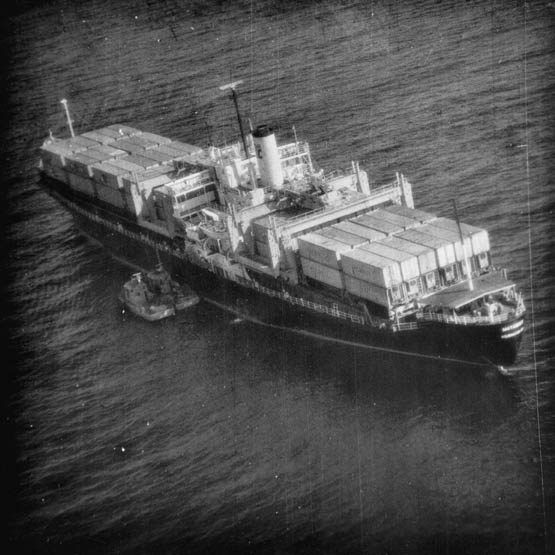
Aerial surveillance photo showing two Khmer Rouge gunboats during the initial seizing of the SS Mayaguez

The following month, Pol Pot, Nuon Chea, and Ieng Sary travelled secretly to Vietnam in May, where they proposed a Friendship Treaty between the two countries. In the short term, this successfully eased tensions. Although the Vietnamese evacuated Poulo Wai in August, incidents continued along Cambodia's northeastern border. At the instigation of the Phnom Penh regime, thousands of Vietnamese also were driven out of Cambodia.

In May, Cambodian and Vietnamese representatives met in Phnom Penh in order to establish a commission to resolve border disagreements. The Vietnamese refused to recognize the Brévié Line—the colonial-era demarcation of maritime borders between the two countries—and the negotiations broke down.

In 1977, the situation rapidly deteriorated. Incidents escalated along all of Cambodia's borders. Khmer Rouge forces attacked villages in the border areas of Thailand near Aranyaprathet. Brutal murders of Thai villagers, including women and children, were the first widely reported concrete evidence of Khmer Rouge atrocities. There were also incidents along the Laos border.

At approximately the same time, villages in Vietnam's border areas underwent renewed attacks. In turn, Vietnam launched air strikes against Cambodia. From 18 to 30 April 1978, Cambodian troops, after invading the Vietnamese province of An Giang, carried out the Ba Chúc massacre causing 3,157 civilian deaths in the province of Tây Ninh, Vietnam. In September, border fighting resulted in as many as 1,000 Vietnamese civilian casualties. The following month, the Vietnamese counter-attacked in a campaign involving a force of 20,000 personnel.

Vietnamese defense minister General Võ Nguyên Giáp underestimated the tenacity of the Khmer Rouge, however, and was obliged to commit an additional 58,000 reinforcements in December. On 6 January 1978, Giap's forces began an orderly withdrawal from Cambodian territory. The Vietnamese apparently believed they had "taught a lesson" to the Cambodians, but Pol Pot proclaimed this a "victory" even greater than that of 17 April 1975. For several years, the Vietnamese government sought in vain to establish peaceful relations with the KR regime. But the KR leaders were intent on war. Behind this seeming insanity clearly lay the assumption that China would support the KR militarily in such a conflict.

Faced with growing Khmer Rouge belligerence, the Vietnamese leadership decided in early 1978 to support internal resistance to the Pol Pot regime, with the result that the Eastern Zone became a focus of insurrection. War hysteria reached bizarre levels within Democratic Kampuchea. In May 1978, on the eve of So Phim's Eastern Zone uprising, Radio Phnom Penh declared that if each Cambodian soldier killed thirty Vietnamese, only 2 million troops would be needed to eliminate the entire Vietnamese population of 50 million. It appears that the leadership in Phnom Penh was seized with immense territorial ambitions, i.e., to recover Kampuchea Krom, the Mekong Delta region, which they regarded as Khmer territory.

Massacres of ethnic Vietnamese and of their sympathizers by the Khmer Rouge intensified in the Eastern Zone after the May revolt. In November, Vorn Vet led an unsuccessful coup d'état. There were now tens of thousands of Cambodian and Vietnamese exiles on Vietnamese territory.

== New Era of Cambodian Society ==
In 2018, Hun Sen and the ruling party of Cambodian People's Party won all 125 seats in the National Assembly after the election. This became the new era of one-party rule in Cambodia, as in most of the former French Indochina including Vietnam and Laos, with both ruling parties, the Lao People's Revolutionary Party and the Communist Party of Vietnam, taking power in 1975. The CPP advocates for Khmer nationalism and rules with King Norodom Sihamoni in Phnom Penh. In June 2020, the Cambodian People's Party headquarters was officially inaugurated.

=== "Young Monks" Movement ===
Another division in the Cambodian sangha can be seen in what has been called the "young monks" movement, a small group of politically active monks (primarily Maha Nikaya) voicing public opposition to the current government. The "young monks" are primarily junior members of the clergy, drawn from temples in and around Phnom Penh. Unlike the Engaged modernists, their interest is not in using the authority of the sangha to aide social development programs, but rather to express direct opposition to government policies and corruption. Since the 1993 UN-monitored elections, monks have been permitted to vote in Cambodia (a move opposed by some senior monks). While this has not resulted in any large-scale mobilization of the sangha as a political force, it has drawn some young monks farther into participation in parliamentary politics. Many of these young monks are associated with opposition figure Sam Rainsy and his political party, the SRP.

Members of the young monks movement have participated in and organized public demonstrations in Phnom Penh, aimed at drawing attention to perceived government misdeeds. The Maha Nikaya hierarchy has condemned this form of political activism, calling for the arrest of some monks and defrocking others.

== See also ==
- Kampuchean People's Revolutionary Party, also known as the Cambodian People's Party (CPP) when it came to power on 7 January 1979
- Cambodian irredentism

== Sources ==
- Chandler, David P. (1992). Brother Number One: A Political Biography of Pol Pot. Boulder, San Francisco, and Oxford: Westview Press. ISBN 0-8133-0927-1.
- Harris, Ian (August 2001), "Sangha Groupings in Cambodia", Buddhist Studies Review, 18 (I), UK Association for Buddhist Studies: 73–106, doi:10.1558/bsrv.v18i1.14469, S2CID 247890925
- Short, Philip (2004). Pol Pot: The History of a Nightmare. London: John Murray. ISBN 978-0719565694.
