= United Issarak Front =

United Issarak Front Samakhum Khmer Issarak
- The flag of the UIF. A flag similar to this, representing five towers of Angkor Wat, was later adopted by the Khmer Rouge and the People's Republic of Kampuchea.
- President: Son Ngoc Minh
- Vice-President: Chan Samay
- Vice-President: Tou Samouth
- Founded: 1950
- Dissolved: 1954
- Headquarters: Eastern Cambodia
- Newspaper: Issarak

The United Issarak Front (UIF; Khmer: សមាគមខ្មែរឥស្សរៈ, Samakhum Khmer Issarak, lit. 'Khmer Issarak Front') was a Cambodian anti-colonial movement 1950–1954, organized by the left-wing members of the Khmer Issarak movement. The UIF coordinated the efforts of the movement as of 1950, and waged war against the French Union forces. At the time of the Geneva Peace Conference in 1954, it is estimated that UIF controlled about half of the Cambodian territory.

== Founding ==
The founding conference of UIF was held in Kompong Som Loeu, Kampot province April 17–April 19, 1950. Around 200 delegates assisted the conference, out of whom 105 were Buddhist monks. Ung Sao, a Viet Minh general assisted the conference. At the conference venue Khmer, Vietnamese and Laotian flags were displayed.

The conference elected a National Central Executive committee headed by Son Ngoc Minh. Other committee members were Chan Samay (deputy), Sieu Heng (secretary), Chan Dara (military commander), Meas Vong (military commander), Meas Vannak (military commander), Chau Yin (military commander), Nhem Sun (military commander), Sok Saphai (military commander), Ngin Hor (military commander), Keo Moni, Ney Sarann, a Phnom Penh representative (possibly Keo Meas) and two representative of expatriate Khmers. The latter are believed to have been the Khmer Krom representatives Meas Vong and Meas Vannak. It is estimated at five of the committee members were affiliated with the Indochinese Communist Party.

== Resistance government ==
The founding conference of the UIF decided to launch a revolutionary proto-government, the People's Liberation Central Committee. The PLCC was led by Son Ngoc Minh. Assisting him the PLCC had three vice-presidents; Chan Samay, Sieu Heng (the PLCC defence minister) and Tou Samouth (all three ICP cadres). Son Phouc Rattana, became the administrative secretary of PLCC. Non Suon was the sixth member of the PLCC leadership.

On June 19, 1950, Son Ngoc Minh declared Cambodia independent. At the same time, he claimed that the UIF armed forces controlled a third of the country.

In 1952, the UIF effectively incorporated the rival Issarak grouping of the Khmer National Liberation Committee, led by Leav Keo Moni and based in the country's north-west, though some anticommunist elements of the KNLC continued to operate independently. The UIF then formed a 'Khmer Resistance Government', with the following composition:

- President: Son Ngoc Minh
- Vice-President: Chan Samay
- Minister of Interior: Tou Samouth
- Minister of Foreign Affairs: Keo Moni
- Minister of Education: Chau Yin
- Minister of Defence: Sieu Heng
- Minister of Ethnic Affairs: Leav Keo Moni
- Minister of Religion: Sos Man

== Armed conflict ==
In August 1950 a UIF military school was founded, with about a hundred armed UIF cadres as its first batch. In September 1950, the French Union forces stepped up their campaign against the UIF. At the time the UIF rebel army had the support of around 3000 Vietnamese Viet Minh troops.

In February 1953 UIF and Viet Minh forces ambushed and killed the governor of Prey Veng. The action constituted a major propaganda victory for the UIF, whose recruitment appeal had been curtailed by the promises of Prince Sihanouk of achieving independence from France.

== Geneva Conference ==
The UIF sent two delegates, Keo Moni and Mey Pho, to the 1954 conference on a peaceful solution to the conflicts in Indochina. The two accompanied the Viet Minh delegation, which arrived in Geneva on May 8. The UIF was, however, officially invited to the conference. In the first speech by the Viet Minh delegate urged that the UIF-led Khmer Resistance Government should be included in the talks, on equal footing with the Royal Government of Cambodia. This plea was supported by the delegates of the Soviet Union and China, V. M. Molotov and Zhou Enlai. Zhou Enlai was, however, convinced by Western powers to withdraw his support for UIF participation in the conference.

The outcome of the conference included a cease-fire that included the UIF, independence of Cambodia under Sihanouk and the withdrawal of Viet Minh forces from Cambodia. The UIF ceased to function. Later, Cambodian communists would argue that the Viet Minh had betrayed the UIF at the conference.

The outcome of the Geneva talks provided that former UIF guerrillas would have been protected by the International Commission of Supervision and Control during the election campaign, but in reality such guarantees were not given. With this backdrop around a thousand of UIF cadres left for Vietnam along with the departing Viet Minh forces, on Polish ships provided by the ICSC on the Mekong river.

== Membership ==
Vietnamese sources claimed that UIF membership had reached 150,000 before the end of 1950. However, a more conservative estimate would be that UIF membership never crossed 20,000.

== UIF and Buddhism ==
Considering that two of the main leaders of UIF, Son Ngoc Minh and Tou Samouth, were former monks, the UIF was able to wield a significant influence amongst Buddhist religious circles. In February 1951, the UIF had organized a Khmer Buddhist conference led by Son Ngoc Minh.

In 1952 Son Ngoc Minh, Prom Samith (a monk who had joined UIF and become the editor of the publication Issarak), Chan Dara and five monks conducted a tour in the Khmer Krom areas. During the tour, they emphasized the role of Buddhism in the national liberation struggle. In the same year Son Ngoc Minh convinced the abbotts of three monasteries in Kampot, that they hold counsel deserters from the UIF to return to the UIF ranks.

== See also ==
- Nguon Hong
