= Son Ngoc Minh =

Khmer Krom communist politician (1920-1972)

- Sơn Ngọc Minh សឺង ង៉ុកមិញ
- Born: 1920; Trà Vinh, Cochinchina, French Indochina (now Vietnam)
- Died: 22 December 1972 (aged 51–52); Beijing, China
- Other names: Achar Mean; Phạm Văn Hua
- Citizenship: Cambodia; Vietnam
- Known for: Co-founding the Kampuchean People's Revolutionary Party
- Political party: Communist Party of Kampuchea (1960–1972); Kampuchean People's Revolutionary Party (1951–1960)

Son Ngoc Minh (Vietnamese: Sơn Ngọc Minh, Khmer: សឺន ង៉ុកមិញ; 1920 – 22 December 1972), also known as Achar Mean (អាចារ្យមាន), was a Cambodian communist politician and co-founder of the Kampuchean People's Revolutionary Party (KPRP), the predecessor to the Communist Party of Kampuchea.

== Biography ==
Son was born in 1920 in Trà Vinh Province (present-day Vietnam) during the French colonial period to a Khmer Krom father and a Vietnamese mother. Before entering politics, he was a Buddhist lay preacher (achar) and was known as Phạm Văn Hua among his Vietnamese colleagues. During the First Indochina War, he was recruited by Vietnamese communists (Viet Minh) to serve as President of a newly formed Cambodian People's Liberation Committee (CPLC) in Battambang. Son was the nearest the Vietnamese had to an authentic Khmer revolutionary. His nom de guerre was intended to capitalise on the popularity of Sihanouk's banished rival, Son Ngoc Thanh, then still languishing in exile in France.

Son was the leader of the first nationwide congress of the leftist Khmer Issarak groups, which founded the United Issarak Front (UIF). In 1950, he formally declared Cambodia's independence after claiming that the UIF controlled one third of the country. Along with Tou Samouth, Son founded the Kampuchean People's Revolutionary Party (KPRP) in 1951. After the Geneva Agreements and the end of the First Indochina War, he and many Khmer Issarak officials left Cambodia for North Vietnam.

Son remained a senior figure in the Party, albeit largely operating from Hanoi in North Vietnam until 1972, when at the request of Ieng Sary, he was sent to hospital in Beijing to be treated for high blood pressure. He died in Beijing on 22 December 1972. His death further lessened the influence of the Hanoi-trained communists on the Khmer Rouge, correspondingly increasing the power of the hardline Party 'Centre' led by Pol Pot.

== Bibliography ==
- Dommen, Arthur J.; The Indochinese Experience of the French and the Americans: Nationalism and Communism in Cambodia, Laos, and Vietnam, Indiana University Press, 2001, ISBN 0-253-33854-9
- Tyner, James A.; The Killing of Cambodia: Geography, Genocide and the Unmaking of Space, Ashgate Publishing, Ltd., 2008

ISBN 0754670961
