= Khmer Krom =

Ethnic Khmers of southwestern Vietnam

ជនជាតិខ្មែរក្រោម (Khmer) Chǒnchiĕt Khmaê Kraôm Người Khmer Nam Bộ (Vietnamese)
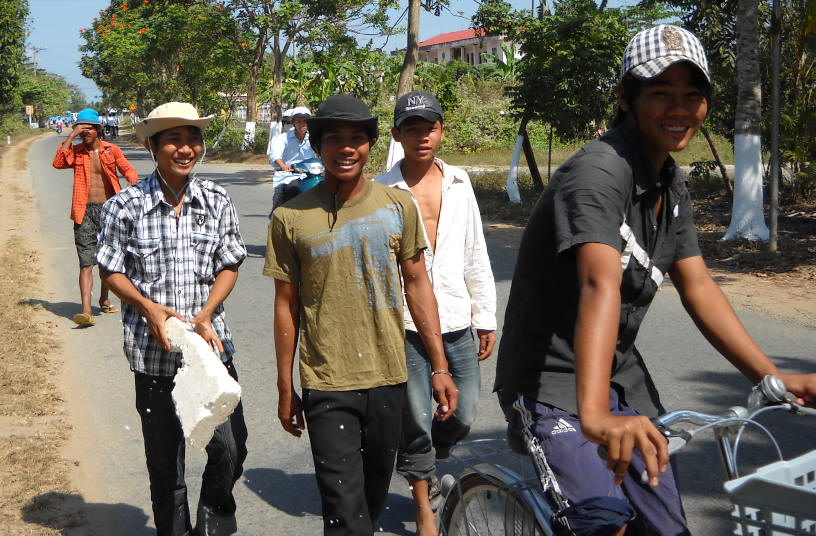
- Khmer Krom people in Vĩnh Long (formerly Trà Vinh province)

Total population
- c. 2.5 million

Regions with significant populations
- Southern Vietnam (Mekong Delta and SE Vietnam): 1.32 million (2019)
- Cambodia: 1.2 million (1999)
- United States: 30,000 (1999)
- France: 3,000 (1999)
- Australia: 1,000 (1999)
- Other countries: 6,000 (1999)

Languages
- Khmer, Vietnamese

Religion
- Theravada Buddhism 95%, Roman Catholic 5%

Related ethnic groups
- Khmers, Northern Khmers

Khmer people in Vietnam or the Khmer Krom (Khmer: ជនជាតិខ្មែរក្រោម, Chǒnchiĕt Khmaê Kraôm, [cɔn.ciət kʰmae kraom]; lit. 'lower Khmer people' or 'southern Khmer people'; (Vietnamese: Dân tộc Khmer Krom, [zʌn˧˧ tokˀ˧˨ xɤ˧˧mɛ˧˧ xᵊɣom˧˧])) are ethnically Khmer people living in or hailing from the Mekong Delta (Tây Nam Bộ), the south western part of Vietnam known in Khmer as Kampuchea Krom (Khmer: កម្ពុជាក្រោម, Kămpŭchiĕ Kraôm [kam.pu.ciə kraom] lit. 'Lower Cambodia'). The Khmer Krom people are considered the indigenous people of parts of Southern Vietnam and have the oldest extant recorded history of inhabiting in the region. In Vietnam, they are recognized as one of Vietnam's fifty-four ethnic minorities.

In accordance with Resolution 117-CT/TƯ issued on September 29, 1981 by the Politburo of the Communist Party of Vietnam and Resolution 122-CT issued on May 12, 1982 by the Vietnamese Ministry Committee, the term Khmer (as well as its Vietnamese transliteration Khơ Me and Khơ-me) was sanctioned by the government as the only state-recognized ethnonym of the Khmer Krom people; the Resolutions also stated that all other colloquial exonyms previously used by Vietnamese to refer to Khmer people "are incorrect and have negative racial connotations" and declared that any acts that intended to incite and direct hate speech and discrimination toward the Khmer people are prohibited by the law.

In Khmer, Krom (ក្រោម kraôm) means 'low' or 'below'. It is added to differentiate from the Khmers in Cambodia. Most Khmer Krom live in Tây Nam Bộ, the southern lowland region of historical Cambodia covering an area of 89,000 square kilometres (34,363 sq mi) around modern day Ho Chi Minh City and the Mekong Delta, which used to be the southeasternmost territory of the Khmer Empire until its incorporation into Vietnam under the Nguyễn lords in the early 18th century. This marks the final stage of the Vietnamese "March to the South" (Nam tiến).

Khmer Krom people have been members of the Unrepresented Nations and Peoples Organization since 15 July 2001.

== Demographics ==
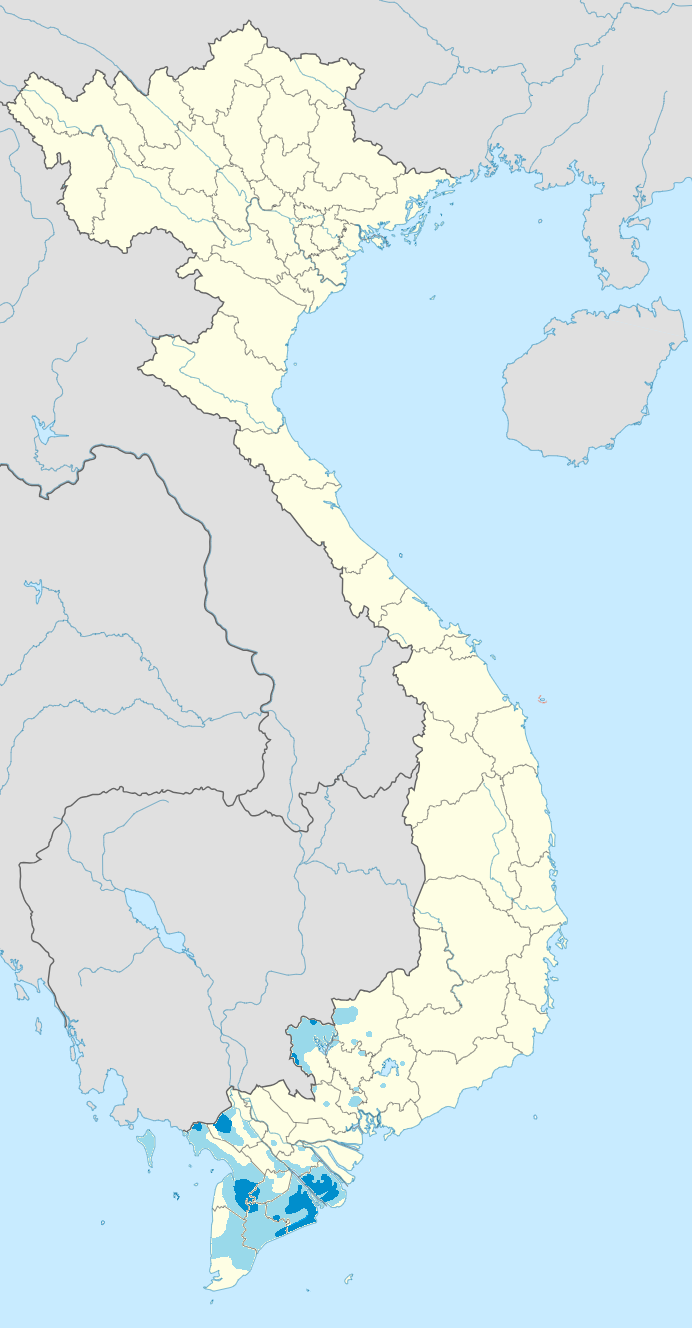
Distribution of ethnic Khmer in Vietnam. Most live around the Mekong Delta and the southernmost areas of Vietnam near the Cambodian border. Dark blue: Majority or major minority (from 30%); Light blue: Minority.

The majority of Khmer Krom live in Southern Vietnam. According to Vietnamese government figures (2019 census), there are 1,319,652 Khmer Krom in Vietnam. Their distribution is as follows: Sóc Trăng (362,029 people, constituting 30.18% of the province's population and 27.43% of all Khmer in Vietnam), Trà Vinh (318,231 people, constituting 31.53% of the province's population and 24.11% of all Khmer in Vietnam), Kiên Giang (211,282 people, constituting 12.26% of the province's population and 16.01% of all Khmer in Vietnam), An Giang (75,878 people), Bạc Liêu (73,968 people), Bình Dương (65,233 people), Hồ Chí Minh City (50,422 people), Cà Mau (26,110 people), Đồng Nai (23,560 people), Vĩnh Long (22,630 people) each constituting less than 10% of all Khmer in Vietnam.

Other estimates vary considerably, with the Khmer Kampuchea-Krom Federation claiming that there are about 7 million Khmer Krom. A significant number of Khmer Krom also fled to Cambodia, estimated at 1.20 million by one source.

In other parts of the world, there are approximately 40,000 Khmer Krom emigrants notably in the United States (30,000), France (3,000), Australia (1,000), and Canada (500). Khmer Krom emigrant communities in the US are located near Philadelphia, Pennsylvania, and in Washington state.

== Origins ==
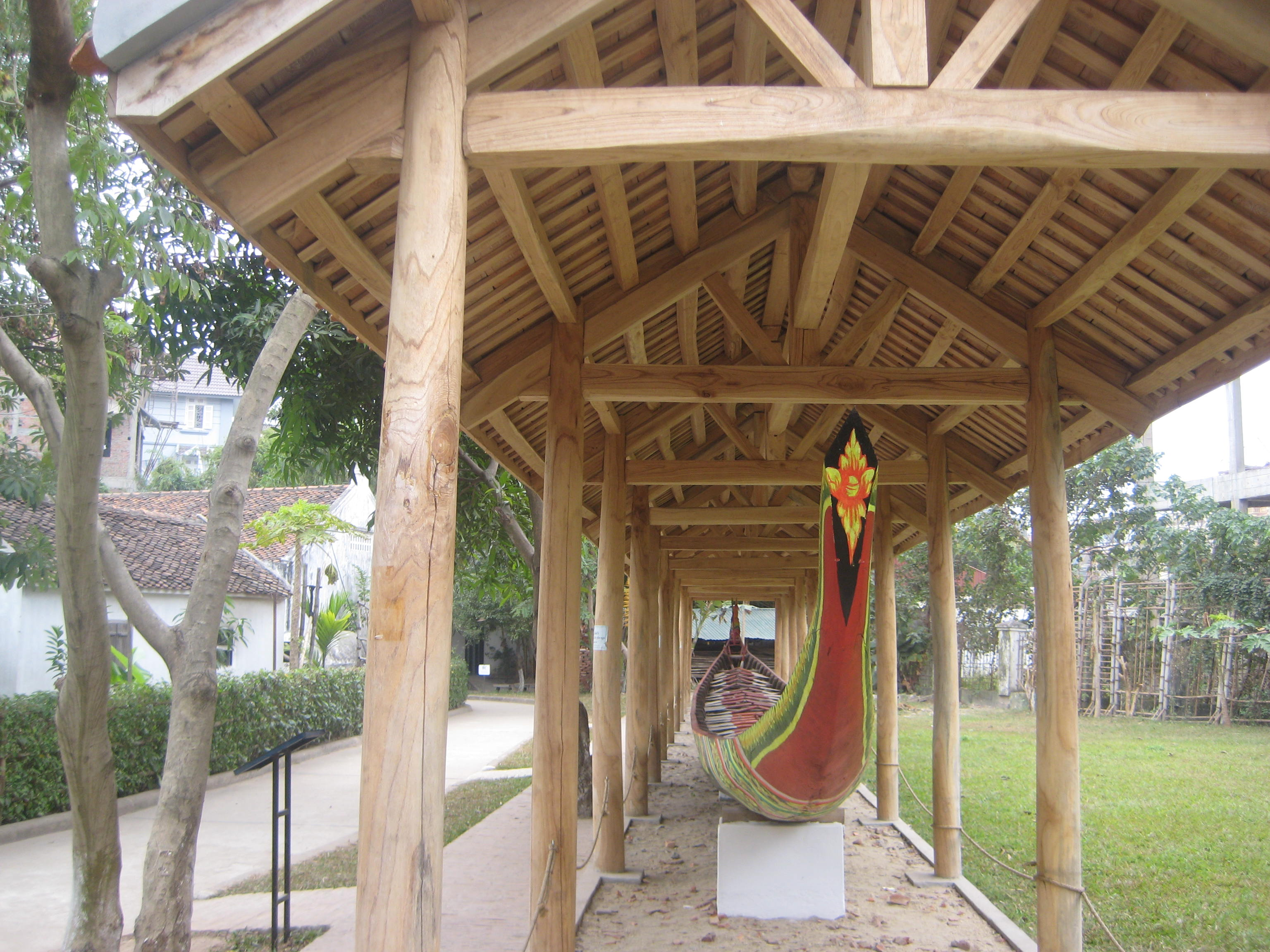
Prow of the tuk ngo, Khmer Krom styled boat used in celebratory races

The Khmer Krom identify ethnically with the Khmer people, who founded the Khmer Empire under the rule of King Jayavarman II in 802 C.E. They retain deep linguistic, religious, customary and cultural links to Cambodia. The Mekong Delta region constituted an integral part of the empire and the subsequent kingdom for more than 800 years. The region's economic center was the city of Prey Nokor, now Ho Chi Minh City.

== History ==
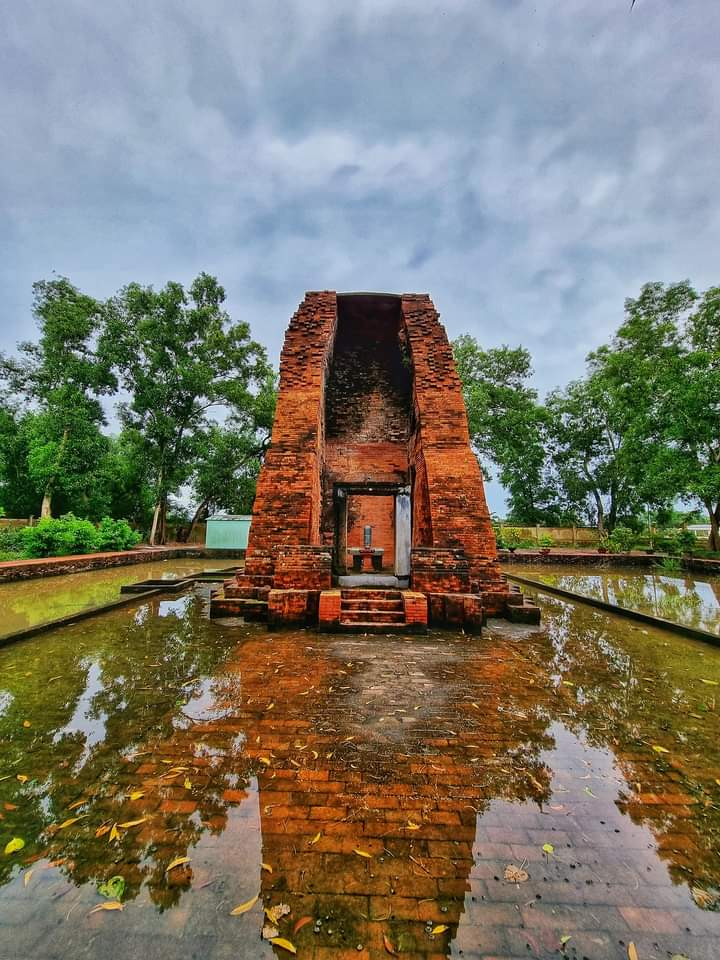
Ancient Vĩnh Hưng tower, a religious structure built in 9th century CE by Khmer people, in Vĩnh Lợi district, Bạc Liêu province

=== Absorption of the Mekong Delta by Vietnam ===
In the 17th century a weakened Khmer state left the Mekong Delta poorly administered after repeated wars with Siam. Concurrently Vietnamese refugees fleeing the Trịnh–Nguyễn War in Vietnam migrated into the area. In 1623 Cambodian king Chey Chettha II (1618–1628) officially sanctioned the Vietnamese immigrants to operate a custom house at Prey Nokor, then a small fishing village. The settlement steadily grew, soon becoming a major regional port, attracting even more settlers.

In 1698 the Nguyễn Lords of Huế commissioned Nguyễn Hữu Cảnh, a Vietnamese noble, to organize the territory along Vietnamese administrative lines, thus de facto detaching it from the Kingdom of Cambodia and incorporating it into Vietnam.

With the loss of the port of Prey Nokor, then renamed Saigon, Cambodia's control of the area grew increasingly tenuous while increasing waves of Vietnamese settlers to the Delta isolated the Khmer of the Mekong Delta from the Cambodian kingdom. By 1757 the Vietnamese had absorbed the provinces of Psar Dèk (renamed Sa Đéc in Vietnamese) on the Mekong itself, and Moat Chrouk (Vietnamized to Châu Đốc) on the Bassac River.

Khmer nationalist Son Ngoc Thanh (1908–77) was a Khmer krom, born in Trà Vinh, Vietnam. Thanh was active in the independence movement for Cambodia. With Japanese support he became the prime minister of Cambodia in March 1945 but was then quickly ousted with the return of the French later that year. Widely supported by the Khmer Krom during the First Indochina War, Thanh's role faded in Vietnam after 1954 as he became more embroiled with politics in Cambodia proper, forming an opposition movement against Prince Sihanouk.

During the Vietnam War and direct American involvement between 1964 and 1974, the Khmer Krom were recruited by the United States Armed Forces to serve in MIKE Force. The force fought on the side of South Vietnam against the Viet Cong but in time the militia regrouped as the "Front for the Struggle of Kampuchea Krom" (French: Front de Lutte du Kampuchea Krom). Headed by a Khmer Krom Buddhist monk, Samouk Sen, the group was nicknamed the "White Scarves" (Khmer: Kangsaing Sar; Vietnamese: Khăn Rằn Trắng) and allied itself with FULRO against South Vietnam. FULRO was an alliance of Khmer Krom, Montagnard, and Cham groups.

The anti-Communist prime minister of the Khmer Republic (1970 - 1975) Lon Nol planned to recapture the Mekong Delta from South Vietnam.

After the Fall of Saigon in 1975 and the Communist take-over of all of Vietnam, the Kampuchea Krom militia found itself embattled with the People's Army of Vietnam. Many of the fighters fled to Khmer Rouge-controlled Democratic Kampuchea hoping to find a safe haven to launch their operations inside Vietnam. The "White Scarves" arrived in Kiri Vong District in 1976, making overture to the Khmer Rouge and appealing to the leader Khieu Samphan directly for assistance. The force was disarmed and welcomed initially.

Subsequent orders from the Khmer Rouge leadership, however, had Samouk Sen arrested, taken to Phnom Penh, tortured, and killed. His force of 67 Khmer Krom fighters were all massacred. During the following months, some 2,000 "White Scarves" fighters crossing into Kampuchea were systematically killed by the Khmer Rouge.

In the late 1970s, the Kampuchean Revolutionary Army attacked Vietnam in an attempt to reconquer the areas which were formerly part of the Khmer Empire, but this military adventure was a total disaster and precipitated the invasion of Democratic Kampuchea by the People's Army of Vietnam and subsequent downfall of the Khmer Rouge, with Vietnam occupying Kampuchea and setting up the People's Republic of Kampuchea.

== Notable people ==
- Chau Sen Cocsal Chhum, Prime Minister of Cambodia (1962)
- Ieng Sary, Khmer Rouge member and Minister of Foreign Affairs of Democratic Kampuchea
- Son Ngoc Minh, co-founder of the Communist Party of Kampuchea
- Son Ngoc Thanh, Prime Minister of Cambodia (1945) and the Khmer Republic (1972)
- Son Sen, Khmer Rouge member and Minister of National Defence of Democratic Kampuchea
- Tou Samouth, co-founder and General Secretary of the Communist Party of Kampuchea (1951–1962)

== See also ==
- Kampuchea Krom
- Khmer people
- History of Cambodia
- Cochinchina
