= Sơn Ngọc Thành =

2nd Prime Minister of Cambodia and Politician

- សឺង ង៉ុកថាញ់
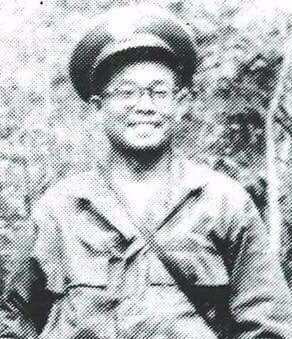
- Thanh in 1936

Prime Minister of the Khmer Republic (Note: Prime Minister of the Japanese puppet Kingdom of Kampuchea in 14 August to 16 October 1945.)
- In office 18 March 1972 – 15 October 1972
- President: Lon Nol
- Preceded by: Sisowath Sirik Matak
- Succeeded by: Hang Thun Hak
- In office 14 August 1945 – 16 October 1945
- Monarch: Norodom Sihanouk
- Preceded by: Norodom Sihanouk
- Succeeded by: Sisowath Monireth

Minister of Foreign Affairs
- In office 1972
- Preceded by: Koun Wick
- Succeeded by: Long Boret

Personal details
- Born: 7 December 1908 Trà Vinh, Cochinchina, French Indochina
- Died: 8 August 1977 (aged 68) Ho Chi Minh City, Vietnam
- Party: Pracheachollana; Khmer Serei

Sơn Ngọc Thành (Khmer: សឺង ង៉ុកថាញ់; 7 December 1908 – 8 August 1977) was a Cambodian nationalist and republican politician, with a long history as a rebel leader and (for brief periods) a government minister.

== Early life ==
Thanh was born in Trà Vinh, Vietnam, to a mother of both Chinese and Vietnamese ancestry and a Khmer Krom father. He was educated in Saigon, Montpellier and Paris, studying law for a year before returning to Indochina. He found work as a magistrate in Pursat and as a public prosecutor in Phnom Penh before becoming deputy director of the Buddhist Institute. Along with another prominent early Khmer nationalist, Pach Chhoeun, he established the first Khmer language newspaper, Nagaravatta, in 1936. The political outlook of Nagaravatta, which urged Khmers to break the commercial monopoly of foreign traders by starting their own businesses, was to make Thanh and his colleagues receptive to Japanese fascism, or as he termed it, "National Socialism". Thanh's ideology was essentially republican, right-wing, and modernising in outlook, which was to make him a longstanding opponent of the King Norodom Sihanouk. Despite his nationalism, he was also a strong advocate of pan-Asian cooperation, and advocated the teaching of the Vietnamese language in Cambodian schools, as it was a potential conduit for modernising ideas.

== Involvement in government ==
After demonstrations against the French in July 1942, Thanh fled to Japan, returning when Sihanouk declared Cambodia's independence on 12 March 1945, during the Japanese occupation. He was made Foreign Minister. In August with the surrender of Japan, Thanh made himself Prime Minister. With the restoration of French control in October, he was arrested, and sent into exile first in Saigon and then in France. Many of his supporters joined the Khmer Issarak resistance to fight the colonial power. In 1951, the authorities brought Thanh back, to considerable popular acclaim; refusing a Cabinet position, he made alliances with various leaders of the Khmer Issarak rebels, and established another newspaper (Khmer Kraok) which advocated revolt against the French administration and was quickly banned. In 1952, accompanied by his lieutenant Ea Sichau (a French-educated customs official and leftist intellectual) and a number of supporters, Thanh disappeared into the forests in the area of Siem Reap, and began to organise resistance.

The Issarak movement was split between the Khmer National Liberation Committee, the more overtly leftist United Issarak Front, and a variety of regional warlords and guerrilla leaders. Thanh attempted to gain overall control of the movement throughout the early 1950s; a few of the movement's leaders, such as Prince Norodom Chantaraingsey and Puth Chhay, temporarily supported his overall leadership. By 1954, however, he had been increasingly sidelined by the leftists, and received overtures from the U.S. Central Intelligence Agency, who would fund many of his activities in future. Though Thanh retained a high degree of support amongst the Khmer Krom, in subsequent years he would have relatively little influence or popular support within Cambodian domestic politics, especially as Sihanouk's Sangkum movement absorbed most centrist and rightist elements.

== Khmer Serei ==
The First Indochina War ended in 1954. From his base near Siem Reap, Thanh organized the Khmer Serei militia, mainly recruited from amongst the Khmer Krom, to fight Sihanouk, who had come to regard Thanh as one of his greatest enemies. In his 1959 "Manifesto" of the Khmer Serei, Thanh charged Sihanouk with allowing the "Communistization" of Cambodia at the hands of North Vietnam. The Khmer Serei operated in the border areas of Thailand and South Vietnam, making clandestine anti-Sihanouk radio broadcasts, but made little headway, although they were suggested as a source of military power in a number of coup plots (such as the Bangkok Plot). After the Cambodian military and Lon Nol overthrew Sihanouk in 1970, Thanh was invited to participate in the new Khmer Republic government - initially as an adviser to the Acting Head of State, Cheng Heng - and put his Khmer Serei troops at its service.

Lon Nol's anti-Communist Government of the Khmer Republic (1970 - 1975) was claiming the Mekong Delta (Southwestern Vietnam) from South Vietnam, raising an unwelcome question to the anti-Communist Government of the South Vietnam Republic but fully satisfying the Khmer Krom organization's expectations.

In 1972, Thanh again became Prime Minister, succeeding to Sisowath Sirik Matak, but after being the target of a bomb attack (possibly organised by Lon Nol's brother, Lon Non) he was soon dismissed by Lon Nol and exiled himself to South Vietnam.

Thanh was arrested by the Viet Cong after the Fall of Saigon, and died in custody in Chi Hoa Prison in Ho Chi Minh City due to illness on 8 August 1977.

== See also ==
- Nguon Hong
- Lon Nol
- Khmer Serei

== Bibliography ==
- Corfield, Justin J. (2009). The History of Cambodia. ABC-CLIO. ISBN 978-0313357237.
- Kiernan, Ben (2004). How Pol Pot came to power. Yale University Press. ISBN 9780300102628.
- Jagel, Matthew (2023). Khmer Nationalist: Sơn Ngọc Thành, the CIA, and the Transformation of Cambodia. Cornell University Press. ISBN 978-1501769337.

Political offices
Preceded by Norodom Sihanouk	Prime Minister of Cambodia; 1945	Succeeded by Prince Sisowath Monireth
Preceded by Sisowath Sirik Matak	Prime Minister of Cambodia; 1972	Succeeded by Hang Thun Hak
