= Khmer Issarak =

Khmer Issarak ខ្មែរឥស្សរៈ
- Leader: Poc Khun; Dap Chhuon; Sieu Heng; Long Bunruot; Son Ngoc Minh; Tou Samouth
- Founded: 1945; 81 years ago
- Dissolved: 1976
- Ideology: Khmer nationalism Anti-colonialism; Socialism; Communism (factions)
- Political position: Big tent (Centre-right, Centre-left to Far-left)

The Khmer Issarak (Khmer: ខ្មែរឥស្សរៈ, lit. 'Free Khmer' or 'Independent Khmer') was a "loosely structured" anti-French and anti-colonial independence movement. The movement has been labelled as “amorphous”. The Issarak was formed around 1945 and composed of several factions, each with its own leader. Most of the Issarak factions fought actively between the end of the Second World War in 1945 and Cambodia’s independence in 1953. The initial objective of the Khmer Issarak was to fight against the French in order to gain independence, before later focusing on overthrowing the Cambodian government. The term Issarak originally referred to non-communist, but in the early 1950s the Việt Minh-guided guerrillas branded themselves Issaraks for the sake of unifying other non-communist forces.

== The Issarak ==
Poc Khun, a highborn Khmer, founded a movement in Bangkok in 1944, and called it the Khmer Issarak for the first time on record. Some of the early Issarak members were backed by the Thai government. From the end of the Second World War through to 1948, the Thai government had a policy of supporting a large number of guerrilla forces, which operated along the Thai frontier and in the two Thai-ruled provinces, Battambang and Siem Reap. Among those groups aided by Thailand, some of the members later established right-wing and left-wing bands, including Son Ngoc Minh, Sieu Heng and Tou Samouth. These guerrillas formed a government in exile in Bangkok in 1945. After 1948, several of the Thai sponsored Issaraks dissolved or cooperated with the Phnom Penh government, led by Prince Sihanouk.

Soon afterwards, the Vietnamese guided-Issaraks formed the Khmer Issarak Association, continuing armed struggles against the Khmer and French authorities. In the 1950s, the Viet Minh controlled-Issarak groups eventually transformed into communist organizations: for instance, the Khmer People’s Revolution Party (KPRP). Several significant figures in the Khmer Rouge and Democratic Kampuchea who participated in the Cambodian Civil War were closely related to the Viet Minh influenced-Issaraks.

During the first decade of armed struggles, there was some coordination between factions, but in most cases, different bands fought independently. Even in 1953, the year Cambodia gained independence, the anti-French war was still led by disparate leaders, who were divided geographically and ideologically.

After the Geneva Conference in 1954, due to the terms of the "Agreement on the Cessation of Hostilities in Vietnam", most Viet Minh guided-Issaraks were either exiled to the Democratic Republic of Vietnam (DRV) or went underground and formed communist organizations. At the same time, as Cambodia had already gained independence from the French, most nationalist Issaraks and some communist groups disarmed themselves. Several powerful Issarak leaders such as Dap Chhuon and Prince Norodom Chantaraingsey allied with the Sihanouk government in different periods of time. The Khmer Issarak movement then faded into history.

== Non-communist Issarak groups ==
During the independence movement, non-communist Issaraks that were based in the northwest dominated the anti-French war which lasted for around 10 years. Those Issarak groups fought throughout the entire state. The non-communist guerrillas often coordinated battles with the Viet Minh-led Issarak forces. Among the non-communist bands, Poc Khun, Dap Chhuon, Prince Chantaraingsey’s were the most prominent.

Furthermore, short-term goal of the Thai-supported Issarak movement was to conduct propaganda against French colonialism in the ceded provinces, which under Thai control from 1941-1946. Nevertheless, the ultimate purpose of the movement was to gain full independence for the French Indochina colony. However, in the rightist military coup in Thailand in November 1947 the Pridi administration was overthrown, and the new Thai government reduced support its and forced the Issaraks to come back to Cambodia.

There were two consequences of the return of Thai Prime Minister Phibun. First of all, with Thailand cutting its assistance the Viet Minh became one of the few sources that the Issarak groups could rely on. Secondly, a permanent split in the Cambodian independent movement between communists and non-communists took place. Due to a large number of guerrilla groups being unwilling to work with the Viet Minh, some of them set up strong bases and became warlords, but the majority dissolved.

=== Poc Khun ===
The first time that the term "Khmer Issarak" was employed was in 1944, after the new Thai Prime Minister Khuang Aphaiwong who took office under the guide of Pridi and his Free Thai movement. Soon a movement called Khmer Issarak was founded by Poc Khun, who used to work in the Publicity Department in Bangkok. Poc Khun was born in a high-ranking aristocratic family in Phnom Penh and coincidentally was the uncle of Prince Monireth’s wife. In August 1946, Poc Khun was the leader of the Khmer Issarak in Battambang province, and was elected as a representative to the House of Representatives from a district in Battambang. He continued to hold office until 1947, even after the province was returned to Cambodia.

=== Dap Chhuon ===
Before the right wing coup in Bangkok in late 1947, a jointly Khmer Issarak-Viet Minh commanded guerrilla group was founded in the Thai capital in February. Dap (Sergeant) Chhuon became the commander of the group. Chhuon was a former Cambodian militia member and an active Issarak. With Thai support, he had organized anti-French guerrilla forces in the ceded provinces since 1943. Chhuon believed in supernatural power and often conducted "magical" ceremonies before his battles. By early 1948, Chhuon was the leader of Viet Minh-associated Khmer People’s Liberation Committee.

Although Dap Chhuon’s army was initially jointly run with the Viet Minh, and he was the president of KPLC, Chhuon himself was not a communist neither his soldiers received Viet Minh training. In 1949, Dap Chhuon rallied with Sihanouk, the negotiation taking a year to reach agreement. In exchange for the submission, Chhuon received administrative and military carte blanche over Siem Reap, which became his fief very soon. After rallying with the King, Chhuon had been appointed as director of security, for the sake of overseeing the 1955 election, and minister of interior in 1957. Ten years after his submission, Chhuon, who was the governor of Siem Reap and military commander of the northwest, was accused of attempting to overturn Sihanouk’s government, and later he was shot by a killer sent by Lon Nol near Siem Reap in February 1959.

== Communist Issarak groups ==
Unlike Dap Chhuon and his army, who were not communist, Sieu Heng, Long Bunruot, Son Ngoc Minh and Tou Samouth, were significant communist fighters in Cambodia and their guerrillas were heavily influenced by the Viet Minh. In provinces close to Vietnam, Vietnamese ideologies, organizations and units played critical roles in developing the anti-French resistance. Political schools were set up by the Indochina Communist Party (ICP) in those bordering provinces. Most of the students were Cambodian who were recruited by the Vietnamese, and they were taught about Marxism-Leninism and significance of cooperating with the Vietnamese. However, as Khmer communist organizations had to subordinate to the victory of the First Indochina War, only at most 5700 soldiers fought the French with the Vietnamese in Cambodia.

=== Sieu Heng ===
Sieu Heng was commander of communist Khmer Issaraks, who became a communist in 1945. He led the military resistance against the French in the 1950s but dropped out of politics afterward. After Son Ngoc Minh left for Hanoi in the mid-1950s, Heng was in charge of communist movements inside Cambodia. Around 1955 election, Heng became a secret agent to Sihanouk and later openly defected to the government, with providing information about revolutionaries to Lon Nol. At the same time, he claimed that “making revolution was impossible”. In 1975, Heng was killed by his wife’s nephew, Long Bunruot.

=== Long Bunruot ===
Long Bunruot, joined the Thai Communist Party in 1946, when he was a student at Thammasat University in Bangkok. After the independence in 1953, Long Bunruot remained revolutionary and continuously fought against the Sihanouk government as an Issarak leader. At the end of the civil war, he became the second vital figure of the Communist Party of Kampuchea (CPK), and better known as Nuon Chea.

=== Son Ngoc Minh ===
Achar Mean, a Khmer monk took his name later as Son Ngoc Minh, in order to link with the former Cambodian Prime Minister Son Ngoc Thanh and the Viet Minh leader Ho Chi Minh. Son joined the ICP in 1945. He was the first Cambodian who joined the Vietnamese dominated organization. After commanding the Cambodian communist to fight the French in the First Indochina War, Son moved to northern Vietnam in 1955 and died in 1972.

In 1950, as a representative of the Cambodia communist, Son Ngoc Minh met Viet Minh’s representatives with Sieu Heng, Tou Samouth and others at Hatien, southern Vietnam, which near Cambodian border. He analysed the revolutionary situation in Cambodia and stated due to the weak “principle force”, Cambodia could hardly have a revolution. Later, the “First National Congress of Khmer Resistance” was held in Cambodia, on the meeting, Khmer Issarak Association and People’s Liberation Central Committee (PLCC) was founded. Minh was the president of the PLCC, which consisted of all former ICP members. Two months later, as the Viet Minh guided-Issarak controlled one third of the Cambodian territory, Minh declared Cambodia’s independence, three years before Sihanouk’s government gained independence from France.

=== Tou Samouth ===
Achar Sok was an outstanding Buddhist scholar and active communist, who took a revolutionary name of Tou Samouth in 1948. At the time of his assassination, he was the secretary of the CPK’s central committee, interior minister of the Committee of Liberation of the Southeast. Years before his assassination in 1962, Tou Samouth was a patron of a young French educated Khmer, who work as Tou Samouth’s secretary. The young man was Saloth Sar, better known as Pol Pot after the establishment of Democratic Kampuchea.

== Legacy of the Issarak movement ==
=== The KPLC ===
On 1 February 1948, the Issarak movement formed the Khmer People's Liberation Committee with Chhuon as its president. Five of its eleven leaders were sympathetic to the Vietnamese, which eliminated certain elements of the Issarak movement. Though Chhuon was nominally anti-communist, the organisation also had two important Viet Minh supporters: Sieu Heng, who was the head of the ICP North-Western branch, and his nephew Long Bunruot.

By this time the Viet Minh was leading a concerted attempt to foster Issarak's anti-colonialism and to turn it into support for communism in general, and Vietnamese communism in particular. This was especially the case on the eastern side of the country, where guerrilla cells were often commanded by Vietnamese. On the other side of the country, Son Ngoc Minh returned from Thailand with enough weapons to equip a fairly large company. In 1947 he established the Liberation Committee of South-West Kampuchea (this is particularly of note, because by the end of the civil war of 1970-75 the south-west had one of the most powerful and well organised communist armies in Cambodia, and which would form the main core of Pol Pot's support). By late 1948 many areas of the country were under the effective control of powerful Issarak organisations.

By 1949, however, the Issarak movement in this form was coming to an end: the French began to exploit the greed of some Issarak leaders by giving them colonial positions, while others went off to join more radical organisations. Chhuon's KPLC expelled Sieu Heng and the majority of the other leftists, and remodelled itself as the Khmer National Liberation Committee, with Prince Chantaraingsey as its military commander. Tou Samouth and the other leftist Issaraks formed the United Issarak Front, which had heavy Vietnamese involvement. Chhuon went over to the French, while Chantaraingsey eventually left the KNLC and aligned with the right-wing, anti-monarchical Khmer nationalists, the Khmer Serai, under Son Ngoc Thanh. The Khmer Issarak were notorious for their violence during this period, known for torture, banditry and summary executions.

=== Foundation of Democratic Kampuchea ===
Not only would the guerrilla tactics and organisation of the Issarak forces be mimicked by the communist forces during the Cambodian Civil War, but many later communists were first introduced to the concepts of Marxist-Leninism whilst involved with the Issaraks. In the eastern area of Cambodia, the leaders of those Viet Minh-influenced forces remained largely unchanged up to and beyond the establishment of Democratic Kampuchea. Until purged by Pol Pot in 1976, their forces not only wore differing uniforms to those of Pol Pot loyalists, but were noted to be exemplary in their treatment of the civilian population and to retain a certain degree of loyalty to Sihanouk.

== See also ==
- Hukbalahap
- Lao Issara
- Seri Thai

== Sources ==
- Becker, Elizabeth (1998). When The War Was Over: Cambodia and the Khmer Rouge Revolution. New York: PublicAffairs.
- Chandler, David Porter (1991). The Tragedy of Cambodian history: Politics, War, and Revolution since 1945. New Haven: Yale University Press.
- Chandler, David Porter (2008). A History of Cambodia. Boulder, Colorado: Westview Press.
- Dommen, A. J. (2001). The Indochinese Experience of the French and the Americans: Nationalism and Communism in Cambodia, Laos, and Vietnam. Bloomington: Indiana University Press.
- Grant, J. S., Moss, L. A. G., & Unger, J. (1971). Cambodia; the widening war in Indochina. New York: Washington Square Press.
- Kiernan, B. (2004). How Pol Pot Came to Power. New Haven, London: Yale University Press.
- McHale, Shawn (2013). "Ethnicity, Violence, and Khmer-Vietnamese Relations: The Significance of the Lower Mekong Delta, 1757–1954" (PDF). The Journal of Asian Studies. 72 (2): 367. doi:10.1017/s0021911813000016. S2CID 162830836.
- Murashima, E. (2005). Opposing French Colonialism: Thailand and the Independence Movements in Indo-china in the early 1940s. South East Asia Research, 13(3), 333-383. doi:10.5367/000000005775179702
- Tully, J. A. (2002). France on the Mekong: A history of the protectorate in Cambodia, 1863-1953. Lanham, MD: University Press of America.
- Vickery, Michael (1984). Cambodia, 1975-1982. Hemel Hempstead; North Sydney: Allen and Unwin in association with South End.
