= Viet Minh =

Vietnam's communist-led independence movement (1941–55)

League for Independence of Vietnam Việt Nam Độc lập Đồng minh
- Abbreviation: Việt Minh
- Leader: Ho Chi Minh (1941–1942); Trường Chinh (1942–1944); Ho Chi Minh (1944–1951)
- Governing body: Viet Minh General Department (Tổng bộ Việt Minh)
- Director of General Department: Nguyễn Lương Bằng (1941–1951)
- Secretary of General Department: Hoàng Văn Thụ (1941–1943); Hoàng Quốc Việt (1943–1951)
- Members of General Department: Võ Nguyên Giáp; Phạm Văn Đồng; Trường Chinh; Trần Huy Liệu; Hồ Tùng Mậu
- Founder: Indochinese Communist Party
- Founded: 19 May 1941 (85 years, 182 days)
- Dissolved: 10 September 1955 (71 years, 68 days)
- Preceded by: Anti-imperialist National United Front of Indochina (Mặt trận Thống nhất Dân tộc Phản đế Đông Dương)
- Succeeded by: (North Vietnam) Vietnamese Fatherland Front (Mặt trận Tổ quốc Việt Nam); National Liberation Front of South Vietnam (Mặt trận Dân tộc Giải phóng miền Nam Việt Nam)
- Headquarters: Pác Bó, Cao Bằng
- Newspaper: Cứu Quốc (National Salvation)
- Armed wing: People's Army of Vietnam
- Ideology: Anti-imperialism; Communism; Marxism–Leninism; Revolutionary socialism; Vietnamese nationalism; Francophobia; Sinophilia (after 1949); Japanophobia (until 1945)
- Slogan: phản Pháp – kháng Nhật – liên Hoa – độc lập "Oppose France – Resist Japan – Ally with China – Independence"

Party flag

The Việt Minh (Vietnamese: [vîət mīŋ̟], chữ Hán: 越盟), officially the League for Independence of Vietnam (Vietnamese: Việt Nam Độc lập Đồng minh or Việt Nam Độc lập Đồng minh Hội, chữ Hán: 越南獨立同盟(會), lit. 'Vietnamese Independence Alliance (Association)'; French: Ligue pour l'indépendance du Viêt Nam), was a communist-led national independence coalition formed at Pác Bó by Ho Chi Minh on 19 May 1941. Also known as the Việt Minh Front (Mặt trận Việt Minh), it was established by the Indochinese Communist Party (ICP) as a united front to achieve Vietnamese independence, the first step in a communist revolutionary project. With the collapse of Japanese authority at the close of World War II, the front moved swiftly to proclaim the Democratic Republic of Vietnam (DRV), the predecessor of today's Socialist Republic of Vietnam.

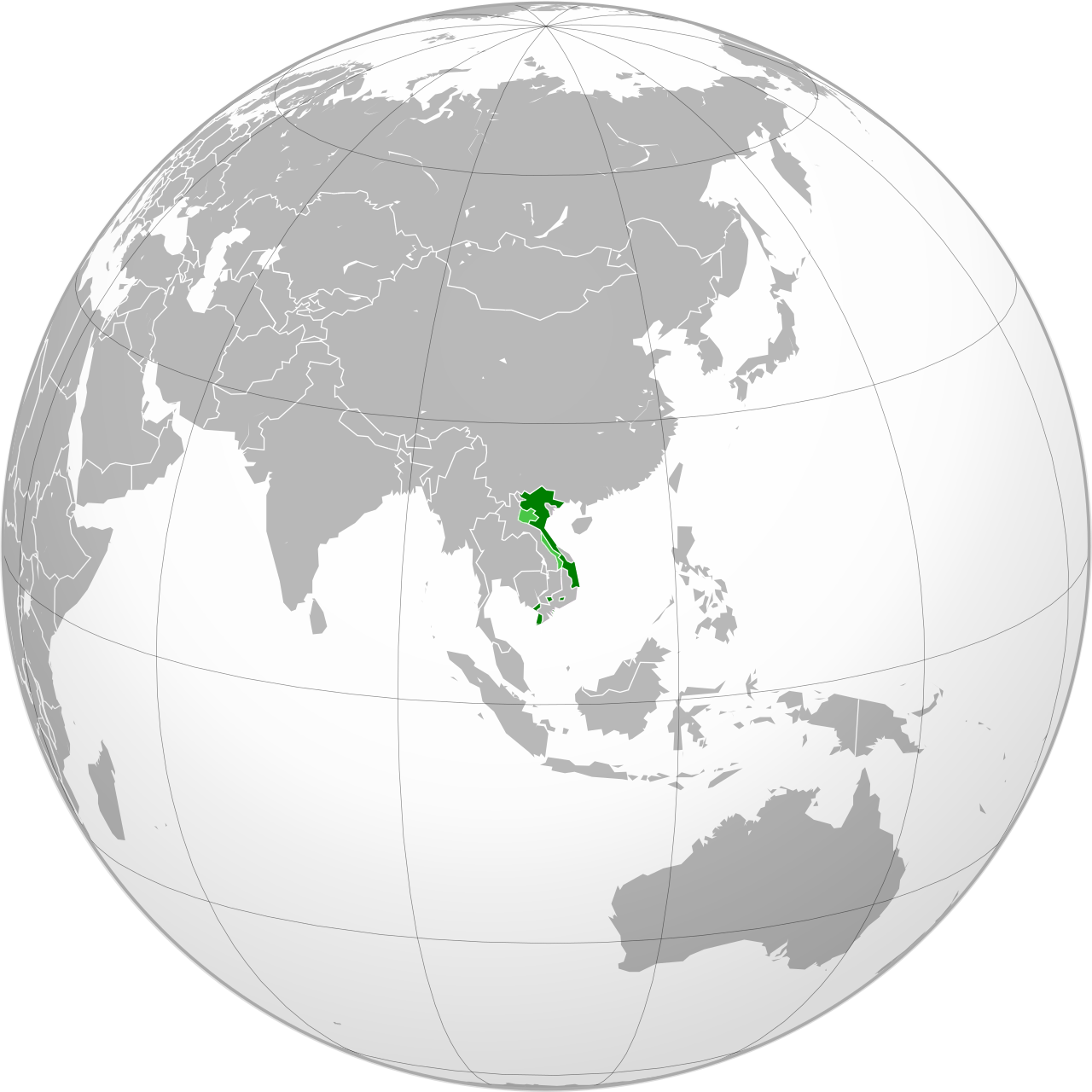
Việt Minh and allies extended controlled territories in early 1954

The ICP presented the Viet Minh as a broad-based coalition comprising various political groups. Accommodation of noncommunists, including the colonial-trained bureaucracy and officials of the Empire of Vietnam, initially helped bring the Viet Minh to power in 1945, but it also blunted the communist core's ability to implement radical socioeconomic policies. After 1950, with the recognition and assistance of communist China and the Soviet Union, the party purged remaining bourgeois elements.

Following the Japanese occupation completed in 1941, the Việt Minh opposed Japan with support from the Republic of China, and later from the US Office of Strategic Services. After World War II, the Việt Minh established the Democratic Republic of Vietnam and opposed the re-occupation of Vietnam by the French Union, resulting in the First Indochina War. It also opposed non-communist Vietnamese nationalists, such as the Việt Nam Quốc Dân Đảng, during civil conflicts, and later opposed the State of Vietnam as well as its successor, the Republic of Vietnam. Until 1948, the Việt Minh advocated putting aside the issue of class struggle and dictatorship of the proletariat to focus on gaining sovereignty for Vietnam. However, the organization's stance changed after being recognized by communist China and the Soviet Union in January 1950.

The political leader of Việt Minh was Ho Chi Minh. The military element was under the command of Võ Nguyên Giáp. Other founders were Lê Duẩn and Phạm Văn Đồng.

The Việt Nam Độc lập Đồng minh is not to be confused with the Việt Nam Cách mệnh Đồng minh Hội (League for the Vietnamese Revolution, abbreviated as Việt Cách) which was founded by Nguyễn Hải Thần. Việt Cách later briefly joined the Vietnamese National Coalition in 1946.

Today, the Vietnam Fatherland Front – a socio-political coalition led by the Communist Party of Vietnam forming the Vietnamese government – is recognized as the modern incarnation of the Việt Minh front in current Vietnamese politics.

== Foundation ==
The League for Independence of Vietnam (Viet Minh) was founded on 19 May 1941 in Pác Bó, Cao Bằng province (in northern Vietnam). Ho Chi Minh was the founder and his Indochinese Communist Party was the main leadership organization within Viet Minh.

== Leadership ==
Ho Chi Minh was the highest leader. Nguyễn Lương Bằng was appointed as the Direct of the General Department (from 1941 to 1951). Hoàng Văn Thụ was appointed as the Secretary of the General Department (from 1941 to 1943 when he was captured by colonial French), and then Hoàng Quốc Việt took over the position (from 1943 to 1951).

Nguyen Luong Bang, Hoang Van Thu and Hoang Quoc Viet were members of the Communist Party.

== Organization ==
At the national level, Viet Minh is governed by the General Department (Tổng bộ). Further down there were executive committees in provinces and cities; and executive commissions in communes.

However, due to political turmoil and civil unrest at the time, plus conflicts with Japanese and French forces, the Viet Minh's General Department was not completely elected. Hence the details about members of the General Department were very scarce and not fully understood.

Viet Minh established strongholds in northern and central Vietnam. But in southern Vietnam, Viet Minh faced many challengers such as Cao Đài, Hòa Hảo (religious sects) and Bình Xuyên (armed group).

== Components ==
=== Main members ===
The founding and core members of Viet Minh were the communists. Other non-communists also joined the front.

- Indochinese Communist Party: the General Secretary was Trường Chinh
- Democratic Party of Vietnam: the Secretary-General was Duong Duc Hien; joined in 1944
- Socialist Party of Vietnam: the Secretary-General was Phan Tu Nghia; joined in 1946
- Vanguard Youth: the chairman was Pham Ngoc Thach; joined in 1945. A small number of organization's leaders joined other political organizations.
- Bình Xuyên Force: the Commander was Dương Văn Dương; joined in 1945. A faction led by Lê Văn Viễn did not follow the Việt Minh and later supported the State of Vietnam and France
- National Salvation Army: the Commander was Chu Văn Tấn; merged with the Propaganda Unit of the Liberation Army into Vietnam Liberation Army in 1945

=== Other opposite parties ===
Even though many opposite parties fought against Viet Minh, many of their members joined Viet Minh and worked with the government of the Democratic Republic of Vietnam.

- Revolutionary League of Vietnam (Viet Cach): Dinh Chuong Duong, Bo Xuan Luat, Ho Duc Thanh, Truong Trung Phung...
- Vietnamese Nationalist Party (Viet Quoc): Phan Khôi, Chu Ba Phuong, Truc Khe...
- National Independent Party of Vietnam: Ngo Tan Nhon
- Vietnamese Trotskyists (Fourth Internationals): Truong Tuu, Le Van Sieu
- League for National Restoration of Vietnam: Ho Hoc Lam

=== Religious organizations ===
The majority of Buddhists supported Viet Minh. The majority of Catholics, Cao Đài, and Hòa Hảo initially supported the Viet Minh but later split into pro–Viet Minh, pro–State of Vietnam, and neutral factions.

- Buddhist Association for National Salvation: Thích Tịnh Khiết, Thích Minh Nguyệt, Thích Trí Thủ, Thích Mật Thể, Thích Trí Quang, Thích Trí Độ...
- Cao Đài Association for National Salvation: Cao Triều Phát, Nguyễn Văn Ngợi, Nguyễn Ngọc Tương...
- Catholic Association for National Salvation: Hồ Ngọc Cẩn, Võ Thành Trinh, Nguyễn Bá Luật, Phan Khắc Từ, Phạm Bá Trực...
- Hòa Hảo Association for Resistance War: a few followers joined the front but not well documented, a known pro-communist Hòa Hảo follower was Huynh Thien Tu
- Protestant Church: Bui Hoanh Thu, Duong Tu Ap, Tran Van De...

=== Peripheral wings ===
Viet Minh established many youth wing, woman wing and military wing. They aimed to draw supports from people of different backgrounds, classes, races, genders and religions.

- National United League of Vietnam (Hoi Lien Viet): the Leader was Huỳnh Thúc Kháng
  - National Salvation Youth Union: founded in 1931, today is the Ho Chi Minh Communist Youth Union
  - National Salvation Women's Union: founded in 1941, today is the Vietnam Women's Union
  - National Salvation Children's Union: founded in 1941, today is the Ho Chi Minh Young Pioneer Organization
  - National Salvation Workers' Union: founded in 1941, today is the Vietnam General Confederation of Labour

=== Military and security wings ===
- Vietnam Liberation Army: founded in 1944; merged from the Propaganda Unit of the Liberation Army and National Salvation Army; the commander was Võ Nguyên Giáp; today is the People's Army of Vietnam
- Vietnam Public Security Service: founded in 1945; the commander was Le Gian; today is the People's Public Security of Vietnam

== World War II ==
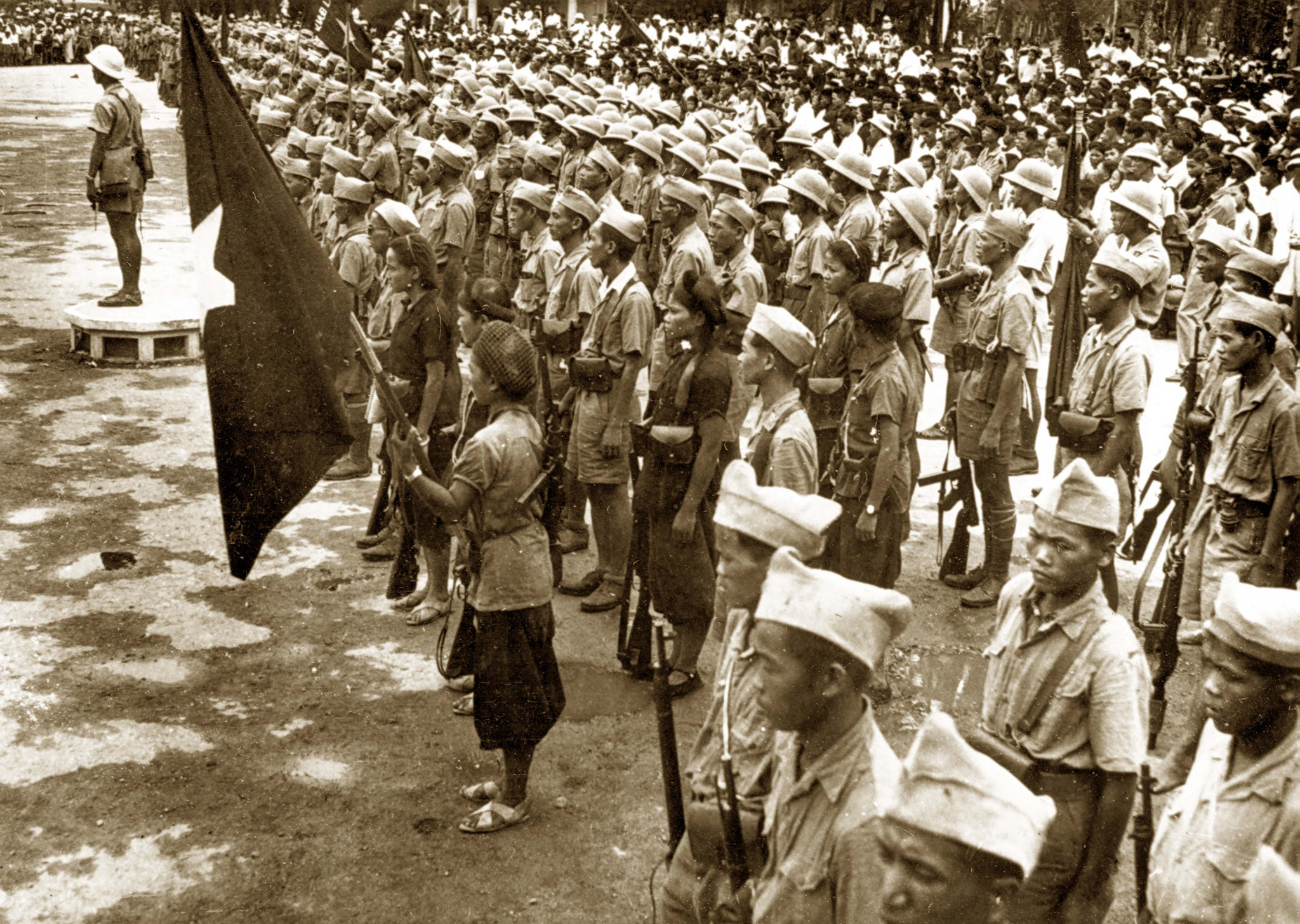
Viet Minh troops on 2 September 1945

The Việt Nam Độc lập Vận động Đồng minh Hội was previously formed by Hồ Học Lãm in Nanjing, China, at some point between August 1935 and early 1936, when Vietnamese nationalist parties formed an anti-imperialist united front. This organization soon lapsed into inactivity, only to be taken over by Ho Chi Minh and the ICP in 1941. During World War II, Japan occupied French Indochina. As well as fighting the French in the battles of Khai Phat and Na Ngan, the Việt Minh started a military campaign against the Japanese. For instance, a raid at Tam Dao internment camp in Tonkin on 19 July 1945 saw 500 Viet Minh kill fifty Japanese soldiers and officials, freeing French civilian captives and escorting them to the Chinese border. The Viet Minh also fought the Japanese 21st Division in Thái Nguyên, and regularly raided rice storehouses to alleviate the ongoing famine.

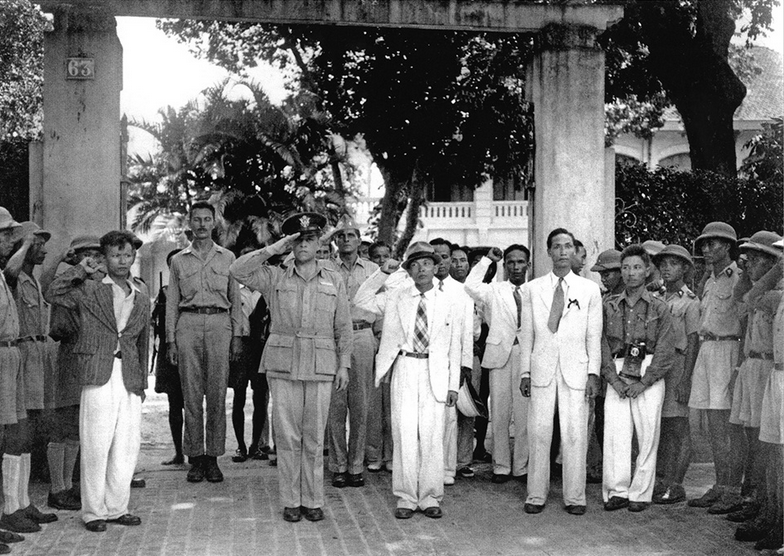
OSS officer Archimedes Patti standing with General Võ Nguyên Giáp at a parade held in honour of the American's contributions to the Viet Minh, 1945

As of the end of 1944, the Việt Minh claimed a membership of 500,000, of which 200,000 were in Tonkin, 150,000 in Annam, and 150,000 in Cochinchina. After the Japanese coup d'état in French Indochina, the Viet Minh and ICP prolifically expanded their activities. They formed national salvation associations (cuu quoc hoi) that, in Quảng Ngãi province alone, enlisted 100,000 peasants by mid-1945. This was backed by the Vanguard Youth (Thanh Nien Tien Phong) in Cochinchina, which expanded to 200,000 by early summer. In the northern provinces of Việt Bắc, their armed forces seized control, after which they distributed lands to the poor, abolished the corvée, established quốc ngữ classes, local village militias, and declared universal suffrage and democratic freedoms.

Due to their opposition to the Japanese, the Việt Minh received funding from the United States, the Soviet Union and the Republic of China. After the August Revolution's takeover of nationalist organizations and Emperor Bảo Đại's abdication to the Việt Minh, Ho Chi Minh declared Vietnam's independence by proclaiming the establishment of the Democratic Republic of Vietnam on 2 September 1945.^{[A]}

== First Indochina War ==
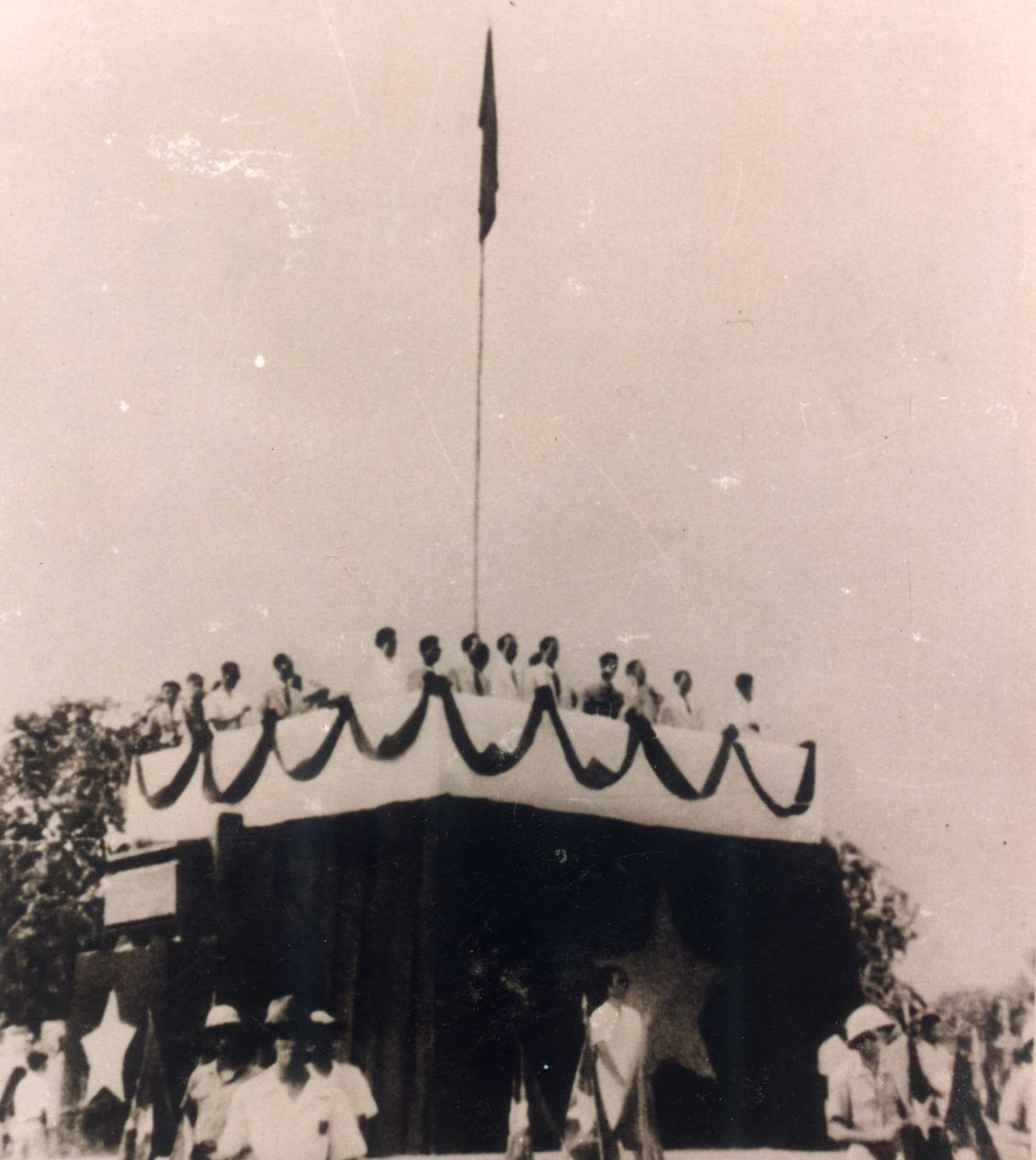
Ho Chi Minh declaring independence at Ba Dinh Square in Hanoi on 2 September 1945

Within days, the Chinese Kuomintang (Nationalist) Army arrived in Vietnam to supervise the repatriation of the Imperial Japanese Army in the North. In the South, Franco-British armies had attacked the Viet Minh since 23 September 1945. The Democratic Republic of Vietnam therefore existed only in theory and effectively controlled no territory. A few months later, the Chinese, Vietnamese and French came to a three-way understanding. The French gave up certain rights in China, the Việt Minh agreed to the return of the French in exchange for promises of independence within the French Union, and the Chinese agreed to leave. Negotiations between the French and Việt Minh broke down quickly in December 1946. What followed was nearly ten years of war against France. This was known as the First Indochina War or, to the Vietnamese, "the French War". The Viet Minh had also been in conflict with the nationalists and Trotskyists since August 1945.

The Việt Minh, who were short on modern military knowledge, created a military school in Quảng Ngãi province in June 1946. More than 400 Vietnamese were trained by Japanese defectors in this school. These soldiers were considered to be students of the Japanese. Later, some of them fought as generals against the Republic of Vietnam in the Vietnam War or, to the Vietnamese communists, "the American War". Young insurgents of the Việt Minh also received training in the use of modern firearms by some foreign volunteers, such as Stefan Kubiak.

French General Jean Étienne Valluy quickly pushed the Việt Minh out of Hanoi. His French infantry with armored units went through Hanoi, fighting small battles against isolated Việt Minh groups. The French encircled the Việt Minh base, Việt Bắc, in late 1947, they caused great damage to the Viet Minh but failed to decisively defeat the Việt Minh forces, and retreated soon after. According to the communists, the campaign was a Việt Minh "victory" over the well-equipped French force. While the war with the Viet Minh was ongoing, France decided to seek an alternative political solution by negotiating with the anti-communist nationalists led by former emperor Bao Dai, leading to the establishment of the unified and "independent" State of Vietnam within the French Union in June 1949. However, the new state remained indirectly controlled by France and was only gradually given power. The United States recognized the new country in February 1950 to help the French fight communism (but opposed colonialism) and opposed the Viet Minh's government that got recognized by the USSR and communist China in January.

The Việt Minh continued fighting lonely against the French until 1950 when they got a massive and important help from the Chinese communists, and later the border of China and Vietnam was linked together as a result of the campaign called Chiến dịch Biên giới ("Borderland Campaign"/Battle of Route Coloniale 4) that year. The newly communist People's Republic of China gave the Việt Minh both sheltered bases and heavy weapons with which to fight the French. With the additional weapons, the Việt Minh were able to take control over many rural areas of the country. Soon after that, they began to advance towards the French-occupied areas.

== Victory and dissolution ==
On 7 March 1951, Viet Minh and National United League of Vietnam (Hội Liên Việt) merged to form the Vietnamese United Front (Mặt trận Liên Việt). Nonetheless, people continued to refer to the new front as the Viet Minh. In late 1953, the Viet Minh began a land reform that ended in disaster.

The United Front became today's Vietnam Fatherland Front (Mặt trận Tổ quốc Việt Nam) on 10 September 1955.

Following the Viet Minh's victory at the Battle of Điện Biên Phủ, the French began negotiations to end the conflict. As a result of peace accords worked out at the Geneva Conference in Geneva, Switzerland, Vietnam was divided into North Vietnam and South Vietnam at the 17th Parallel with the French army retreating to the South and the Viet Minh army retreating to the North as a temporary measure until unifying elections could take place in 1956. Transfer of civil administration of North Vietnam to the Viet Minh was given on 11 October 1954. Ho Chi Minh was appointed Prime Minister of North Vietnam, which would be run as a socialist state. Ngo Dinh Diem, who was previously appointed Prime Minister of South Vietnam by Emperor Bảo Đại, eventually assumed control of South Vietnam.

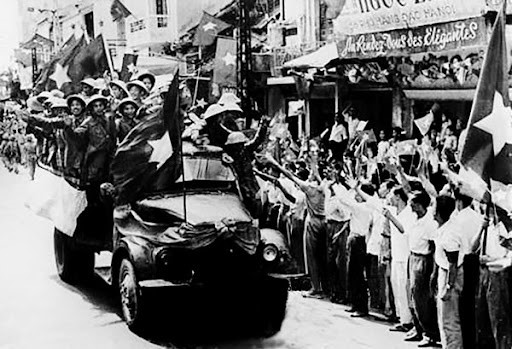
Viet Minh troops on parade in Hanoi

The Geneva Accords promised elections in 1956 to determine a national government for a united Vietnam. Neither the United States government nor Ngô Đình Diệm's State of Vietnam signed anything at the 1954 Geneva Conference. With respect to the question of reunification, the non-communist Vietnamese delegation objected strenuously to any division of Vietnam, but lost out when the French accepted the proposal of Việt Minh delegate Phạm Văn Đồng, who proposed that Vietnam eventually be united by elections under the supervision of "local commissions". The United States countered with what became known as the "American Plan", with the support of South Vietnam and the United Kingdom. It provided for unification elections under the supervision of the United Nations, but was rejected by the Soviet delegation. From his home in France, Vietnamese Emperor Bảo Đại appointed Ngô Đình Diệm as Prime Minister of South Vietnam. With United States support in rigging the referendum of 1955 using secret Central Intelligence Agency (CIA) funding, Diệm removed the Emperor and declared himself the president of the Republic of Vietnam. A year later, the republic's constitution was promulgated.

The United States believed Ho Chi Minh would win the nationwide election proposed at the Geneva Accords. In a secret memorandum, Director of CIA Allen Dulles acknowledged that "The evidence [shows] that a majority of the people of Vietnam supported the Viet Minh rebels." Diem refused to hold the elections by citing that the South had not signed and were not bound to the Geneva Accords and that it was impossible to hold free elections in the communist North. Vietnam wide elections never happened and Việt Minh cadres in South Vietnam secretly kept by the communists launched an insurgency against the government. North Vietnam also occupied portions of Laos to assist in supplying the insurgents known as the National Liberation Front (Viet Cong) in South Vietnam. As part of the global Cold War, the war gradually escalated into the Second Indochina War, called the "Resistance War against America" by Vietnamese communists and commonly known as the "Vietnam War" internationally.

== Influences on neighbouring countries ==
=== Khmer Viet Minh ===
The Khmer Việt Minh were the 3,000 to 5,000 Cambodian communist cadres, left-wing members of the Khmer Issarak movement regrouped in the United Issarak Front after 1950, most of whom lived in exile in North Vietnam after the 1954 Geneva Conference. Khmer Issarak and United Issarak Front were under leadership of Son Ngoc Minh, Tou Samouth, Sieu Heng, etc. It was a derogatory term used by Norodom Sihanouk, dismissing the Cambodian leftists who had been organizing pro-independence agitations in alliance with the Vietnamese. Sihanouk's public criticism and mockery of the Khmer Issarak had the damaging effect of increasing the power of the hardline, anti-Vietnamese, but also anti-monarchist, members of the Communist Party of Kampuchea (CPK), led by Pol Pot.

The Khmer Issarak and United Issarak Front were instrumental in the foundation of the Cambodian Salvation Front (FUNSK) in 1978. The FUNSK invaded Cambodia along with the Vietnamese Army and overthrew the Democratic Kampuchea Pol Pot state. Many of the Khmer Việt Minh had married Vietnamese women during their long exile in Vietnam.

=== Laotian Viet Minh ===
Lao Issara (Free Laos) was a political and military organization of Laotian communists, led by Phetsarath, Souphanouvong, Kaysone Phomvihane, Phoumi Vongvichit. Lao Issara received training and support from Việt Minh. Under French intervention, Lao Issara was split into non-communists and communists. Laotian non-communists under leadership of Pretsarath later established the Kingdom of Laos which was part of the French Union.

However Laotian communists rejected the French offer and fought side by side with Vietnamese communists during the First Indochina War. In 1950, Lao Issara was renamed to Pathet Lao (Laos Nation) under leadership of Souphanouvong, Kaysone Phomvihane, Phoumi Vongvichit, etc.

== See also ==
- Viet Cong
- Pathet Lao
- United Issarak Front
- August Revolution
- History of the Communist Party of Vietnam

== Notes ==
A.^{^} While the Viet Minh was absorbed into "Lien Viet" at the end of World War II, which itself was controlled by the Lao Dong (Workers' Party of Vietnam), many sources refer to the military movement of the Vietnamese Communist Party as the "Viet Minh" till the establishment of the Democratic Republic of Vietnam after the defeat of the French.
