= Sea (disambiguation) =

A sea is a large body of salty water.

Sea or SEA may also refer to:

== Places ==
- SEA, an acronym for Southeast Asia
- SEA, an acronym for Southeast Africa
- Sea, Somerset, a hamlet in South Somerset, England
- SEA, a common abbreviation for Seattle, Washington

== People with the name ==
- Sea Kumada (born 2001), Japanese child actress

== Arts, entertainment, and media ==
=== Music ===
- Sea (EP), an EP by Doves
- Sky Eats Airplane, or SEA, a digital metalcore band from Texas
- Streaming equivalent albums, see album-equivalent unit

=== Radio ===
- Sea 92FM, a New Zealand radio station
- Sea FM, an Australian radio network

=== Other uses in arts, entertainment, and media ===
- Sea (advertisement), an advertising campaign in 2007 to promote Smirnoff vodka
- Svensk exegetisk årsbok (SEÅ), an annual peer-reviewed academic journal of biblical studies and book reviews
- SEA Today, a defunct Indonesian television channel

== Companies and brands ==
- Sea Ltd, Singaporean internet services company
- Société d'Etudes Aéronautiques, aircraft manufacturers
- Svensk Elektrobil AB, was a Swedish company that made electric vehicles
- System Enhancement Associates, an American software developer, known for ARC file compression

== Organizations ==
- Scientists and Engineers for America, a pro-science political advocacy group
- Sea Education Association, an ocean science and sailing program
- Service d'enquête sur les accidents des transports publics, a former agency of the government of Switzerland
- Service des essences des armées, French army supply corps
- Servicio de Evaluación Ambiental, Chilean agency handling environmental permits
- Sistema Eléctrico de Aysén, a power grid in Chile
- Slovenian Environment Agency
- Socialist Environmental Alliance, a political party in Northern Ireland
- Society for Economic Anthropology
- Southern Economic Association
- Sports & Exhibition Authority of Pittsburgh and Allegheny County
- State education agency
- Swaziland Environment Authority, former name of Eswatini Environment Authority
- Syrian Electronic Army, a group of computer hackers supporting the government of Bashar al-Assad since 2011

== Science and technology ==
- .sea, a StuffIt Expander archive (or application)
- Schoof–Elkies–Atkin algorithm
- Search engine advertising, also referred to as search engine marketing
- Statistical energy analysis
- Sustainable Experience Architecture, a modular electric vehicle platform developed by Geely
- Mini-SEA (mini-Social cognition & Emotional Assessment), neuropsychological test battery

== Transportation ==
- SS Sea, an American steamship
- Seattle–Tacoma International Airport, Washington (IATA code: SEA)
- King Street Station, Seattle, Washington (Amtrak code: SEA)
- Seaham railway station, County Durham, England (UK National Rail code: SEA)

== Other uses ==
- Secondary Entrance Assessment
- Single European Act (1986/87), the first major revision of the 1957 Treaty of Rome
- Strategic environmental assessment
- A common abbreviation for the U.S. city of Seattle, Washington and its major professional sports teams:
  - Seattle Seahawks, the city's National Football League team
  - Seattle Mariners, the city's Major League Baseball team
  - Seattle Kraken, the city's National Hockey League team

== See also ==
- List of seas
- Seah (disambiguation)
- Seas (disambiguation)
- See (disambiguation)
- The Sea (disambiguation)
