= Khmer National Army =

Army of the Khmer Republic (1970-1975)

- កងទ័ពជាតិខ្មែរ; Armée nationale khmère
- Khmer National Army emblem (1970–1975)
- Active: 20 November 1946 – June 1970 as the Khmer Royal Army; 9 October 1970 – 17 April 1975 as the Khmer National Army
- Country: First Kingdom of Cambodia; Khmer Republic (Cambodia)
- Allegiance: King Sihanouk (1946–1970); Lon Nol (1970–1975)
- Branch: Ground forces
- Type: Army
- Role: Land warfare
- Size: 150,000 men (at height)
- Part of: Royal Khmer Armed Forces (1946–1970); Khmer National Armed Forces (1970–1975)
- Garrison/HQ: Norodom Boulevard, Phnom Penh (Headquarters), Khmer Republic
- Colours: Blue, red
- Anniversaries: 20 November – Army Day; 15 August – Armed Forces Day
- Engagements: First Indochina War; Cambodian Civil War; Vietnam War; Laotian Civil War

Commanders
- Notable commanders: Sosthene Fernandez; Sak Sutsakhan; Lon Non; Norodom Chantaraingsey

Insignia
- ANK flag (1970–1975)

The Khmer National Army (Khmer: កងទ័ពជាតិខ្មែរ; French: Armée nationale khmère, ANK) was the land component of the Khmer National Armed Forces (FANK), the official military of the Khmer Republic during the Cambodian Civil War between 1970 and 1975.

== History ==
The oldest and largest branch of the Cambodian armed forces in terms of personnel and matériel, the Khmer Royal Army (French: Armée Royale Khmère – ARK) was officially created on 20 November 1946, after the signing of a French–Khmer military agreement which defined the provisional organization of both the ARK and the mixed French-Cambodian troops. The terms of the agreement stipulated that the new armed forces would consist of indigenous territorial units stationed within Cambodia to help maintain order and a mobile reserve (French: Reserve Mobile) comprising 8,000 Khmer soldiers, to be divided on equal halves of 4,000 each between the ARK and the mixed infantry units of the French Far East Expeditionary Corps (CEFEO), placed at the disposal of the French High Commissioner for Indochina. The formation and instruction of the ARK units was entrusted to a French Military Training Mission (French: Mission Militaire Française d'Instruction Militaire), staffed by French Army officers and NCOs, who acted as instructors and military advisers.

Three days later, the first entirely Cambodian regular military unit, the 1st Khmer Rifle Battalion (French: 1ér Bataillon de Chasseurs Khmères – 1st BCK), was raised by the French Military Mission in Phnom Penh, formed by elements transferred from both the Khmer National Guard (French: Garde Nationale Khmère – GNK) and the Cambodian Rifle Regiment (French: Régiment de Tirailleurs Cambodgiens – RTC), comprising three rifle battalions, of the colonial French Union Army. A second rifle battalion (French: 2éme Bataillon de Chasseurs Khmères – 2nd BCK), created out from locally recruited Khmer irregular auxiliaries (French: Supplétifs) was raised at Kratie in December that year. Both battalions were posted to the mobile reserve in January 1947.

Led by a cadre of French officers and senior NCOs, and intended to be used on internal security operations to reinforce CEFEO regular troops, the new Khmer battalions saw their first combat in 1947 against Vietminh guerrilla forces in north-eastern Cambodia. Small-scale counter-insurgency operations, this time against the Cambodian nationalist Khmer Issarak rebel movement, continued over the next three years, during which the Khmer battalions gradually assumed responsibility for the defence of Battambang and Kampong Thom Provinces, which had been part of the territory returned to Cambodia by Thailand in early 1947.

=== The ARK in the First Indochina War ===
This period saw a rapid expansion of ARK units and by January 1947, its effective strength stood at about 4,000 men, of which 3,000 served in the GNK. In July 1949, a second French–Khmer military agreement was signed, granting Cambodian military forces further operational autonomy in the Siem Reap and Kampong Thom provinces. Under an additional protocol signed in June 1950, Cambodian provincial governors were assigned the responsibility for the pacification of the provinces under their jurisdictions; to accomplish this mission they were given each a counter-insurgency force consisting of one independent Khmer infantry company. Late that year, a military assistance agreement was signed between the United States and France, which provided for the expansion of indigenous military forces in Indochina, and by 1952 ARK strength had reached 13,000 men, outnumbering the French CEFEO forces stationed in Cambodia. New Khmer rifle battalions were formed, specialized combat-support units were established, and a framework for logistical support was set up.

A third Rifle Battalion (3rd BCK) was raised in August 1948 at Takéo, followed in January 1951 by other two rifle battalions (5th BCK and 6th BCK) at the French-run Pursat Infantry Training Centre (French: Centre d'Entrainement de Infanterie – CEI). Two armoured car squadrons were formed, the 1st Reconnaissance Squadron (French: 1ér Escadron de Reconnaissance Blindée – 1st ERB) in August 1950 and the 2nd Reconnaissance Squadron (French: 2éme Escadron de Reconnaissance Blindée – 2nd ERB) in July 1951 at Phnom Penh, and a Khmer Parachute Battalion (French: 1ér Bataillon Parachutiste Khmèr – 1st BPK) was officially created in 1 December 1952. Two additional infantry battalions were raised in April 1953 – 7th BCK in Siem Reap and 8th BCK at Ta Khmao in Kandal Province, bringing total strength up to 6,000 men, with about half serving in the Khmer National Guard and half in the mobile reserve. The latter at this time comprised three rifle battalions, with one of its battalions been allocated to French Union forces elsewhere in Indochina. Cambodian military units were given wider responsibility, including the protection of the rubber plantations along the middle Mekong River region, and surveillance of the coastal areas of the southern Cambodian provinces and of the eastern border areas with Cochinchina to prevent infiltration attempts by Vietminh guerrilla units.

Although French-trained Khmer junior officers and NCOs slowly began to take a leading role over time, the ARK was still kept firmly under the control of the French High Command through its military training mission, renamed in 1951 "French Military Mission to the Government of Cambodia" (French: Mission Militaire Française près du Gouvernment du Royaume du Cambodge). The ARK General Staff was filled entirely by French senior and intermediate rank officers, who did most of the command-and-control support, intelligence work and training, and supervised weaponry and equipment deliveries to the Khmer military units. By mid-1953, however, at the instigation of their youthful King Norodom Sihanouk, Khmer military personnel began not only to participate in anti-French nationalistic demonstrations calling for complete Cambodian independence, but they also deserted French-led units by the hundreds. Following a world tour to publicize his campaign for independence, termed the 'Royal Crusade for Independence' (which included a mixture of genuine enthusiasm, bravado, press leaks, overseas excursions and threats to arm the population), King Sihanouk retired to a "free zone of independence" set up at Battambang Province, where he was soon joined by 30,000 ARK troops and Police in a show of support and strength.

In October that year, the French High Command finally agreed to transfer responsibility for Cambodian national security to the ARK and for that effect, another French-Khmer military agreement was signed. Under the terms of this agreement, the French-led Khmer military units were to be transferred to the control of the Cambodian national authorities, and that an operational zone was to be created in the east bank of the Mekong and assigned to the French Union forces. The latter was held jointly by the French Lower Mekong Operational Group (French: Groupement Opérationnel du Bas Mékong – GOBM) and ARK units, which provided security to the entire length of Route 13 inside Cambodia. The only elements that remained subordinated to the French Commander-in-Chief in Cambodia were the Military Mission and the GOBM. The ARK and the Khmer National Guard were consolidated into a new national defense force comprising 17,000 men, the Cambodian National Armed Forces (French: Forces Armées Nationales Cambodgiennes – FANC). At this stage the FANC consisted of ground forces only, although plans were being laid by the French for the creation in a foreseeable future of Air and Naval components.

On 9 November 1953, the Kingdom of Cambodia officially proclaimed its independence from France. Meanwhile, the expansion of the newly created FANC continued with the addition that same month of two new light infantry battalions, the 9th BCK raised in Svay Rieng and the 10th BCK at Prey Veng. The Kingdom of Cambodia was granted full independence on 20 November that year and King Sihanouk officially took command of the 17,000-strong FANC, though France maintained the right to station CEFEO units in north-eastern Cambodia to guard its communications links with Tonkin.

In early 1954, the "Khmerization" of the FANC units still under the command of French officers and NCOs began to be implemented, with most of these cadres assuming the roles of technical advisors or instructors, while others kept their posts in the various unit headquarters' staffs and technical branch services. However, due to the lack of a clear development plan for the FANC, and to compensate for the shortages of trained officers, its officer corps was expanded by replacing the departing French cadres with poorly trained Khmer reserve officers, who were simply incorporated into the active duty officers' and NCO corps. Certain Khmer reserve officers were placed in the territorial commands, while the upper echelons of command were filled by Khmer senior civil servants hastily commissioned as military officers, whose grade was based on their civilian rank. In this system, a provincial governor or the president of a tribunal could become a Lieutenant colonel or Colonel without having ever received military training of any sort.

The FANC continued to expand in the following months to accommodate new ground units and branches of service. An autonomous Cambodian armored battalion (French: Bataillon Blindée Cambodgien – BBC) was set up by the French, equipped with US-made armored cars, half-tracks and scout cars, and a naval and riverine service, the Royal Khmer Navy (French: Marine Royale Khmère – MRK) was officially established on 1 March. By April 1954, the FANC consisted of ground and naval branches, with the former reverting to its original designation of Khmer Royal Army (ARK).

=== The neutrality years 1964–1970 ===
In response to the coup against President Ngô Đình Diệm in South Vietnam, Prince Sihanouk cancelled on 20 November 1963 all American aid, and on 15 January 1964 the U.S. MAAG aid program was suspended when Cambodia adopted a neutrality policy. The ARK continued to rely on French military assistance but at the same time turned to the Soviet Union, the People's Republic of China, Czechoslovakia, Britain, Belgium and West Germany for weapons, equipment and training.

=== Pre-1970 organization ===
The Royal Khmer Army's own military organization and tactical training reflected French traditions. By January 1970, ARK strength stood at about 35,000 officers and enlisted men and women, organized into 53 regiments (actually, battalions) and 13–15 regional independent companies; slightly over half were designated infantry battalions (French: Bataillons d'Infanterie), and the remainder light infantry battalions (French: Bataillons de Chasseurs) and border commando battalions (French: Bataillons Commando). Elite troops and some support units, including the Khmer Royal Guard (French: Garde Royale Khmère), Phnom Penh garrison, Airborne troops (French: Parachutistes or Troupes Aeroportées), Signals (French: Transmissions), Engineers (French: Génie), Artillery (French: Artillerie), Anti-Aircraft (French: Defense Antiaérienne), and Transport (French: Train or Transport) were organized into six larger formations termed Half-Brigades (French: Demi-Brigades). Other technical branch services such as Medical (French: Service de Santé, or simply Santé), Military logistics (French: Service de Matériel), Ordnance (French: Munitions), Military Fuel/Petrol, Oil and Lubricants – POL (French: Service de Essence), Quartermaster (French: Service de Intendance), Military Police (French: Prevôtée Militaire or Police Militaire – PM), Military Justice (French: Justice Militaire), Social and Cultural Services (French: Services Sociales et Culturelles), Geographic Services (French: Service Geographique), and Veterinary Services (French: Service Vétérinaire) were placed under the responsibility of the Service Directorates subordinated to the Ministry of National Defense.

Cambodia was divided since September 1969 into seven military districts termed "Military Regions" – MRs (French: Régions Militaires) encompassing one to ten military sub-districts (French: Subdivisions) of unequal size roughly corresponding to the areas of the country's 23 provinces and districts. They comprised the 1st MR (French: Région Militaire 1), 2nd MR (French: Région Militaire 2), 3rd MR (French: Région Militaire 3), 4th MR (French: Région Militaire 4), 5th MR (French: Région Militaire 5), and 6th MR (French: Région Militaire 6). Most ARK units were concentrated in the northeast at Ratanakiri Province and on the Phnom Penh area; the latter was the headquarters of the six main Half-Brigades and supporting services whereas infantry formations were deployed throughout the country. The small armoured corps was also organized into an Armoured Half-Brigade (French: Demi-Brigade Blindée Khmère) consisting of two independent tank battalions – one stationed at Phnom Penh and the other at Kampong Cham – and an armoured reconnaissance regiment, 1st ARR (French: 1re Régiment de Reconnaissance Blindée) at Sre Khlong in Kampong Speu Province. Although a sizeable reserve cadre of trained officers and NCOs did existed, there was a persistent lack of reserve units. Some units were posted to the General reserve forces, which consisted merely of the Phnom Penh garrison troops – a half-brigade made of two light infantry battalions – and the combat support units (signals, engineers, armoured, and artillery half-brigades). With the exception of a few specialized units, most of these formations actually fell below strength, were poorly trained and equipped in a haphazard way with an array of French, American, British, Belgian, West German, Czechoslovak, Chinese and Soviet weapon systems.

=== Expansion 1970–1971 ===
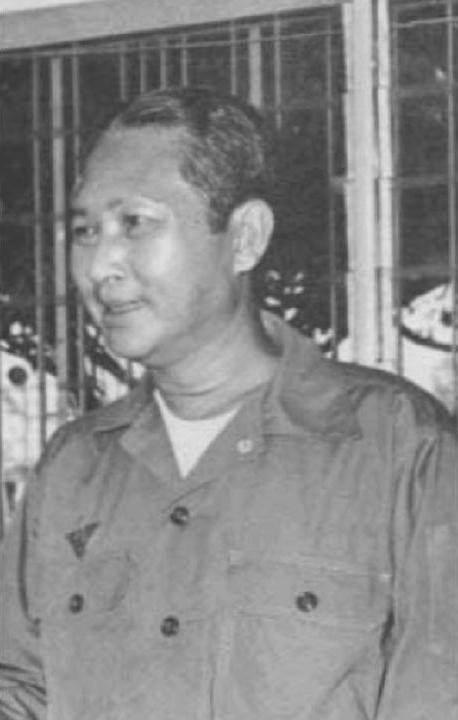
Marshal Lon Nol, President of the Khmer Republic, Phnom Penh, Cambodia, 31 March 1972.

Following the March 1970 coup, the new Head of State Marshal Lon Nol issued a general mobilization order and, after securing American, Thai and South Vietnamese military support, promptly set up ambitious plans to expand the Cambodian armed forces. Shortly after the coup, however, China and the Soviet Union severed their military assistance programs, and the French military mission suspended all cooperation with Cambodia, thus depriving its Army of vital training and technical assistance. By June 1970, the rechristened Khmer National Army (French: Armée Nationale Khmère – ANK), had rapidly expanded to 110,000 men and women, though most of them were untrained raw recruits organized into a confusing array of French- and American-modelled combat formations, staffed by elderly NCOs and inexperienced young officers.

At the same time, there were several changes regarding field organization. Regular infantry battalions were at first amalgamated into autonomous regiments (French: Régiments d'Infanterie Autonomes – RIA), soon abolished in favour of a brigade grouping several battalions. By early May 1970, twenty new Infantry Brigades (French: Brigades d'Infanterie – BI) had been created, but only fourteen – the 1st, 2nd, 3rd, 4th, 5th, 6th, 7th, 8th, 9th, 10th, 11th, 12th, 13th, and 14th Inf. Bdes – were properly manned, the other six – 15th, 16th, 17th, 18th, 19th, and 20th Inf. Bdes – were never brought to strength or remained on paper.

From mid-1970, Infantry units began to be formed into larger 15 Brigade Groups (French: Groupments Brigades d'Infanterie – GBI), each comprising two brigades and roughly the size of a Division, but lacking support units. Of these, only three were military effective by January 1972, other three were still undergoing training, and the remaining nine were only marginally reliable. The Artillery, Signals, Engineer, Transport, and Armoured Half-Brigades were also brought to brigade strength, with the latter becoming the 1st Khmer Armoured Brigade (1st Arm. Bde, 1re Brigade Blindée Khmère in French).

=== Re-organization 1972–1973 ===
To streamline the mass of ground forces' combat formations, a major reshuffle was implemented between July and December 1972 along American lines. The old organizational structure modelled after the French Army was abandoned in favour of a modern conventional organization based on the U.S. Army model.

By January 1973, all brigade group headquarters (HQs), 17 regimental HQs, 16 brigade HQs, and 13 battalions had been dissolved, replaced by newly created 32 infantry brigades, 202 infantry battalions, and 465 territorial infantry companies. Out of these totals, 128 battalions formed the maneuver elements for the 32 brigades, of which 20 would remain independent and 12 were to be distributed among new four Mechanized Infantry Divisions (French: Divisions d’Infanterie) created from existing Brigade Groups. A fifth division, the understrength 9th Guards Division was later raised in April 1974. The Armour, Artillery, Signals, Transport, and Engineer arms were left untouched by this reorganization and retained their separate brigade structure under their own commands. The General Reserve was also reorganized by Marshal Lon Nol in April 1972 by sub-dividing it into three groups: the Forces A, attached to a MR for combat operations; Forces B, the General Staff reserve comprising five brigades; and Forces C, two airborne battalions under the personal command of Lon Nol.

The ANK order-of-battle by mid-1973 thus consisted of:

- 4 infantry divisions
  - 1st Infantry Division (French: 1re Division d'Infanterie)
  - 2nd Infantry Division (French: 2éme Division d'Infanterie)
  - 3rd Infantry Division (French: 3éme Division d'Infanterie)
  - 7th Infantry Division (French: 7éme Division d'Infanterie)
- 9 independent infantry brigades
- 2 airborne brigades (one of which was never brought to strength, and was disbanded that same year)
- one armored brigade
- one Lake Brigade
- one battalion-sized Special Forces unit
- 5 support services' brigades
  - 1st Artillery Brigade (French: 1re Brigade d'Artillerie)
  - Signals Brigade (French: Brigade de Transmissions)
  - 1st Engineer Brigade (French: 1re Brigade de Génie)
  - 1st Transportation Brigade (French: 1re Brigade de Transport)
- 15 regional infantry brigades attached to the Military Regions (MR)
- one air defense half-brigade

Territorial units included:

- 58 infantry battalions assigned to each of the military sub-districts within the larger MRs
- 529 independent infantry companies
- 76 field artillery batteries

Cambodian Army strength stood at 220,000–230,000 troops on paper by mid-1972, but is estimated that the actual number was no less than 150,000, armed by the United States with US$1.18 billion-worth of weaponry and equipment. Its inventory included 241,630 rifles, 7,079 machine guns, 2,726 mortars, 20,481 grenade launchers, 304 recoilless rifles, 289 howitzers, 202 tracked armoured personnel carriers and 4,316 trucks.

== Elite forces ==
- Cambodian Airborne Brigade
- Para-Commando Battalion
- Khmer Special Forces
- Lake Brigade

== List of Khmer National Army commanders ==
=== Chiefs of Staff ===
- Lieutenant general Sisowath Sirik Matak – FANK Chief-of-Staff (1970–1972).
- Lieutenant General Sosthène Fernandez – FANK Chief-of-Staff and Commander-in-Chief of the ANK (1972–1975).
- Lieutenant general Sak Sutsakhan – Minister of Defence and commander of the ANK Special Forces.

=== Senior Staff officers ===
- Brigadier general (later, Major general) Thongvan Fanmuong – 1st Military Region 1 commander, later FANK Chief of Operations.
- Brigadier general (later, Major general) Ek Proeung – Member of the Armed Forces Council, head of the Security Council and later minister of the interior, general mobilization, pacification, security and religion.
- Brigadier general Mey Si Chan – FANK leading spokesman and head of the 3rd Bureau of the ANK General Staff.
- Brigadier general Sar Hor – Military Region 5 commander and Governor of Battambang province (1974–January 1975), later ANK deputy Chief-of-Staff (January–April 1975).
- Major (later, Brigadier general) Am Rong – Spokesman for the Khmer Republic High Command (1970–1975).

=== Notable field commanders ===
- Lieutenant general (later, General) Saukam Khoy
- Major general Mhoul Khleng
- Major general U Say
- Major general Sek Sam Iet – Governor of Battambang province (1968–1974).
- Brigadier general In Tam – Governor of Kampong Cham province and commander of the Kampong Cham military sub-district (1970–1971).
- Brigadier general Ung Nhach – Governor of Kampot province (1973–1975).
- Brigadier general Norodom Chantaraingsey – Commanding Officer of the 13th Infantry Brigade (a.k.a. the 13th "Tiger" Brigade) and Military Region 2 commander.
- Brigadier general Um Savuth – 1st Military Region 5 commander.
- Brigadier general Hou Hang Sin – 1st Commander-General of the Phnom Penh Special Military Region.
- Brigadier general Un Kauv – Commanding Officer of the 7th Infantry Division.
- Brigadier general Dien Del – Commanding Officer of the 2nd Infantry Division, later governor of Kandal province (1974–1975).
- Brigadier general Ith Suong – 1st Commanding Officer of the 1st Infantry Division, later commander of the 9th Guards Division.
- Brigadier general Uk Sauv – 2nd Commanding Officer of the 1st Infantry Division.
- Brigadier general Ngoun Ly Kheang – 3rd Commanding Officer of the 3rd Infantry Division.
- Brigadier general Deng Layom – Commanding Officer of the 6th Infantry Brigade, later commander of the 1st Khmer Armoured Brigade and 2nd Commanding Officer of the 7th Infantry Division.
- Brigadier general Khy Hak – 3rd Commanding Officer of the 7th Infantry Division.
- Brigadier general Mom Cheng Y – Deputy Commanding Officer of the 7th Infantry Division.
- Brigadier general Sok San – Commanding Officer of the 1st Artillery Brigade.
- Brigadier general Yang Yok Hang – Head of the Selective Service and last Commander-General of the Phnom Penh Special Military Region (March–April 1975).
- Brigadier general Teap Baen
- Brigadier general Tip Mam
- Brigadier general Thach Sary – Chief of the ANK Quartermaster Corps.
- Colonel Hin Num – Governor of Takeo province (1972–1975).
- Colonel Keth Reth
- Colonel (later, Brigadier general) Thach Reng – 1st Commanding Officer of the Khmer Special Forces (1971–1975).
- Colonel (later, Brigadier general) Lon Non – Commanding Officer of the 15th Infantry Brigade, later 1st Commanding Officer of the 3rd Infantry Division.
- Colonel Kim Phong – 2nd Commanding Officer of the Khmer Special Forces (April 1975).
- Lieutenant colonel (later, Brigadier general) Les Kosem – Commanding Officer of the 5th Special Brigade.
- Lieutenant colonel (later, Brigadier general) Chhim Chhuon – Chief of the ANK Military Police Corps, later Commander-General of the Phnom Penh Special Military Region.
- Lieutenant Colonel Lim Sisaath – Chief of the ANK Ordnance Corps.
- Lieutenant colonel Chak Bory
- Lieutenant colonel Im Chhou Deth – Aide to Maj. Gen. Sek Sam Iet, Governor of Battambang province.
- Captain Dominique Borella – Commanding Officer of the 1st Cambodian Parachute Brigade (1974–1975).

== Combat history ==
=== Early operations 1970–1971 ===
The FANK suffered its first major setback in February 1971 during Operation Chenla I, an offensive launched earlier in late August 1970 targeting North Vietnamese strongholds in northeastern Cambodia, when a Cambodian Army combined twelve battalion-strong task-force was annihilated by a PAVN counterattack that ripped apart many elite Cambodian military units, including some of the American-trained Khmer Krom volunteer battalions recruited straight out of South Vietnam. Almost simultaneously, on the night of 21–22 January 1971 a hundred or so-strong PAVN "Sapper" force (Vietnamese: Đắc Cộng) managed to pass undetected through the defensive perimeter of the Special Military Region (French: Region Militaire Spéciale – RMS) set by the ANK around Phnom Penh and carried out a spectacular raid on Pochentong airbase, virtually destroying the Khmer Air Force (KAF) on the ground. The raid forced the FANK High Command to recall and redeploy some units of its 'Chenla' task-force to protect the Cambodian capital and its environs, effectively bringing the entire operation to an end.

A second attempt to recover the lost momentum of Chenla I was made on August 21, 1971, with Operation Chenla II, which saw another FANK task-force being decimated again by an PAVN counterattack held later in December that year. Indeed, the final attack on Cambodian Army positions during that month virtually wiped out ten infantry battalions (including once again the sacrifice of the best Khmer Krom battalions) and resulted in the loss of another ten battalions-worth of equipment, which included two howitzers, four tanks, five armoured personnel carriers, one scout car, ten jeeps, and about two dozen other vehicles. Militarily and psychologically, the damage suffered during Operation Chenla II was a big one from which the Cambodian Army would never recover. From then on, the Republican government focused on consolidating its hold over the key urban centers, the main garrisons and the lower Mekong-Bassac river corridors, thus leaving most of the countryside virtually open to Khmer Rouge recruiting drives.

=== Operations 1972–1973 ===
During the Battle of Kampong Cham in September 1973, the FANK High Command launched Operation "Castor 21", a successful combined amphibious assault by a joint task-force of Marines, SEALs and the Cambodian Army's 80th Infantry Brigade with the assistance of the Khmer National Navy (MNK) into the enemy-held half of the city. The MNK ran some twenty convoys between Phnom Penh and Kampong Cham, despite sustaining heavy losses as the boats and landing crafts on the river transporting the FANK task-force units were exposed for six hours to enemy fire from the riverbanks.

=== Final operations 1974–1975 ===
In March 1974, the FANK carried out a second large-scale amphibious assault, Operation "Castor 50", during which another joint task-force of Army and Marine units was ferried up the Tonle Sap river to retake both Kampot, the capital of Kampot province and Oudong, the capital of Oudong Meanchey province from the Khmer Rouge, who were waiting for them at the predicted landing site with B-40 rocket launchers and Type 56 75 mm recoilless rifles. Although at the Battle of Oudong the FANK task-force lost four landing crafts, and some 25 soldiers were killed at debarkation, the MNK did manage to deliver thirty M113 APCs, six trucks, four M101A1 105 mm towed field howitzers, and no less than 2,740 Marine and Army troops, who succeeded in recapturing the burn-out town.

In January 1975, coinciding with the North Vietnamese spring offensive that shattered the South's defences apart, the Khmer Rouge closed in on Phnom Penh, already overcrowded with 250,000 civilian refugees, and besieged it. President Lon Nol, FANK Commander-in-Chief Gen. Sosthene Fernandez and other Khmer Republic officials could not coordinate an effective resistance and at the same time feed the refugees and residents of the Cambodian Capital. On April 1, Marshal Lon Nol resigned from the Presidency and left the Country with his entire family by plane to Bali, Indonesia, although most of the senior civilian and military government officials decided to stay. Later on April 17, the FANK Chief of the General Staff Lt. Gen. Sak Sutsakhan was evacuated together with his family and relatives of other officials by helicopter to Kampong Thom, thus effectively ending the FANK's existence as a coherent fighting force.

The last stand of the army of the ill-fated Khmer Republic in any form took place around Preah Vihear, a temple in the Dângrêk Mountains, close to the Thai border. Remnants of the ANK's 9th Brigade Group occupied the area for a few weeks in late April 1975, following the collapse of the Khmer Republic. Even though their government had surrendered, ANK soldiers continued to fiercely hold their ground for nearly a month after the fall of Phnom Penh against several unsuccessful attempts by Khmer Rouge forces to reduce this last holdout. The Khmer Rouge finally succeeded on May 22, after shelling the hill where the temple stands, scaling it, and routing the defenders, as Thai officials reported at the time.

== Aftermath ==
On 17 April 1975 the Khmer Rouge entered Phnom Penh, bringing the Cambodian Civil War to an end. Prime minister Long Boret, Lon Non and other FANK senior staff officers and top officials of the Khmer Republic government were summarily executed without trial at the Cércle Sportive complex, while Army troops in the city were disarmed, being subsequently taken to the Olympic Stadium and executed as well.

The same fate befell on the remaining Cambodian Army units and garrisons still holding on to the provincial capitals and some key towns. Throughout the country, thousands of demoralized Cambodian men and women who had the misfortune of being captured wearing the Army uniform – ranging from officers to NCOs, and even ordinary soldiers, regardless if they had committed any war crimes or not – were rounded up by Khmer Rouge guerrilla units and massacred. In Phnom Penh and elsewhere, some officers and enlisted men narrowly avoided capture by quickly changing to civilian clothes and went into hiding. While scores of surrendering Cambodian soldiers were simply shot by firing squad and had their bodies dumped into shallow graves dug in forest areas, a considerable number of them were sent to be 're-educated' in the new labor camps (best known as the "Killing Fields") promptly set up by the Khmer Rouge shortly after their victory, where they were forced to endure the camps' terrible living and working conditions until the 1978–79 Cambodian–Vietnamese War. Only a few Army personnel in April–May 1975 managed to escape by foot or by vehicle across the border into Thailand, where in the late 1970s they would provide the founding cadre for the anti-Vietnamese Sihanoukist National Army (ANS) and the Khmer People's National Liberation Armed Forces (KPNLAF) guerrilla forces.

== Weapons and equipment ==
=== Small-arms ===
During the First Indochina War, ARK Infantry battalions were issued with WWII-vintage MAS-36 (airborne units received the folding-stock MAS-36 CR39 paratrooper version), M1903 Springfield, and Lee–Enfield SMLE Mk III bolt-action rifles, MAS-49 semi-automatic rifles and MAS-49/56 semi-automatic carbines, along with Sten, M1A1 Thompson and MAT-49 submachine guns. FM 24/29, Bren, M1918A2 BAR, and M1919A6 light machine guns were used as squad weapons; a few M1917 Browning machine guns were also used as company weapons. Officers and NCOs received Modèle 1935A, MAS-35-S, FN P35 or Colt.45 M1911A1 pistols. In September 1950, the ARK began the process of standardisation on U.S. equipment, with infantry and airborne units taking delivery of the M1 Garand semi-automatic rifle, the M1/M2 Carbine (airborne units received the semi-automatic M1A1 paratrooper carbine), and the M3A1 Grease Gun, followed by the Browning M1919A4 .30 Cal Medium machine gun and the Browning M2HB .50 Cal Heavy machine gun. After U.S. military assistance was renounced in 1964, the ARK received from China, the Soviet Union and other Eastern Bloc countries substantial numbers of the Type 54 pistol, SKS semi-automatic rifle, Vz. 58 assault rifle, AK-47 assault rifle, Degtyaryov DP/DPM light machine gun, RPD light machine gun, SG-43/SGM Goryunov medium machine gun, DShKM Heavy machine gun, and RPG-2 and RPG-7 anti-tank rocket launchers. In addition, limited quantities of FN FAL and Heckler & Koch G3 battle rifles were reportedly acquired from Belgium and West Germany, but they were never adopted as standard weapons. ARK infantry and airborne formations were also equipped with crew-served weapons, comprising Brandt Mle 1935 60 mm, Brandt Mle 27/31 81 mm and M2 4.2-inch (107 mm) Mortars, M18A1 57 mm, M20 75 mm, B-10 82 mm and B-11 107 mm recoilless rifles.

In the early months of the Cambodian Civil War, most Cambodian infantry units fought the People's Army of Vietnam (PAVN) and Khmer Rouge with a mix of surplus World War II-vintage French and U.S. and modern Soviet and Chinese infantry weapons either inherited from Khmer Royal Army stocks or delivered as emergency aid by the Americans. ANK infantry battalions later sent to South Vietnam for retraining between February 1971 and November 1972 under the U.S. Army-Vietnam Individual Training Program (UITG) were issued upon their return to Cambodia M1917 Revolvers, Smith & Wesson Model 10 revolvers, Colt.45 M1911A1 and Smith & Wesson Model 39 pistols, M16A1 assault rifles, M1918A2 BAR light machine guns, Browning M1919A4 .30 Cal medium machine guns, Browning M2HB .50 Cal heavy machine guns, M79 grenade launchers, M72 LAW Anti-tank rocket launchers, M19 60 mm and M29 81 mm mortars and M40A1 106 mm recoilless rifles. Limited quantities of the Ithaca 37 pump-action shotgun, CAR-15 carbine, the M60 machine gun, the M203 grenade launcher, the M67 recoilless rifle, and the M202 FLASH Multishot incendiary rocket launcher were also provided to the ANK, eventually finding their way into Cambodian elite troops, such as the Khmer Special Forces and the Recondo companies. Although the UITG and MEDTC aid programs allowed the ANK to standardise on modern U.S. weapons, they never superseded entirely the earlier weaponry, particularly in the case of the territorial units and rear-echelon support formations.

=== Armoured vehicles ===
The ARK armoured corps inventory consisted of thirty-six M24 Chaffee light tanks, forty AMX-13 Light tanks and some M8 HMC 75 mm self-propelled howitzers; reconnaissance squadrons were provided with five M8 Greyhound armoured cars, fifteen M20 armoured utility cars, and fifteen Panhard AML-60 armoured cars. Mechanized infantry battalions were issued with M2 half-track cars, M3 half-tracks, fifteen M3A1 scout cars, BTR-40 and thirty BTR-152 armoured personnel carriers (APCs).

In October 1970, the ANK command sought to expand its armoured corps but, despite repeated requests for the delivery of more modern M41 Walker Bulldog light tanks and V-100 Commando armoured cars, they were declined by Washington. The Americans did delivered though a total of 202 M113 armoured personnel carriers (including seventeen M106A1 mortar carriers equipped with a 107 mm heavy mortar). Thus Cambodian armoured and mechanized infantry units continued to rely on their ageing fleet of U.S. M24 and French AMX-13 light tanks, M8, M20 and AML-60 armoured cars, M3A1 scout cars, M2 and M3 half-tracks, and Soviet BTR-40 and BTR-152 APCs until 1974, when mounting combat losses and maintenance problems forced the withdrawal of most of these vehicles (in particular the French ones, after France placed a spare parts embargo) from frontline service, being gradually replaced by M113 APCs.

=== Artillery ===
The ARK artillery corps fielded M116 75 mm pack field howitzers, ZiS-3 76 mm anti-tank guns, M101A1 105 mm towed field howitzers, twelve Soviet M-30 122 mm howitzers, Chinese Type 59-1 130 mm field guns, plus twenty towed Soviet BM-13 132 mm and ten towed BM-14 140 mm multiple rocket launchers (MBRL). Air Defense units were equipped with British-made Bofors 40 mm L/60 anti-aircraft guns, twenty-seven Soviet AZP S-60 57 mm anti-aircraft guns, Chinese Type 55/65 37 mm anti-aircraft guns, and eight Soviet KS-19 100 mm air defense guns.

In 1972–73 the ANK artillery corps was re-structured under U.S. lines, receiving additional twenty-five M101A1 105 mm towed field howitzers, M102 105 mm towed light howitzers, ten M114A1 155 mm towed field howitzers and eight tracked M109 155 mm self-propelled guns, meant to replace the Soviet and Chinese artillery pieces gradually withdrawn from service due to a lack of spare parts and ammunition.

=== Transport and liaison vehicles ===
Logistics were the responsibility of the ARK transport corps, equipped with a variety of liaison and transportation vehicles. The motor pool consisted in a mixed inventory totalling 150 vehicles, including WWII-vintage U.S. Willys MB ¼-ton (4x4) jeeps, Land Rover (4x4) Series I-II, Dodge WC-51/52 ¾-ton (4×4) utility trucks, Soviet GAZ-69A (4x4) field cars and GAZ-63 (4x4) 2-ton trucks. Heavier transport vehicles ranged from ex-French Army WWII-vintage U.S. GMC CCKW 2½ ton (6x6) and Chevrolet G506 1½ ton (4x4) trucks to Chinese Yuejin NJ-130 2.5 ton (4x2) trucks and Jiefang CA-30 general purpose 2.5 ton (6x6) trucks.

The ANK also received after 1970 a new influx of much-needed softskin transport and liaison vehicles. Early in the War, the Army Command was confronted with a serious logistical problem – the small number of outdated U.S., Soviet, and Chinese military trucks available from its transport corps soon proved insufficient to carry the increasing number of troops mobilized, let alone resupplying them over long distances. To remedy the inequities of its transportation system during the first year of the War, Army field commanders resorted to commandeering civilian buses and other commercial vehicles to get their troops to the front. In 1971–72, the transport corps was re-organized and expanded with the help of the U.S. and Australia, who provided 350 M151A1 ¼-ton (4x4) utility trucks (a number of which were converted into makeshift armoured cars for security and road convoy escort duties), Dodge M37 ¾-ton (4x4) 1953 utility trucks, M35A2 2½-ton (6x6) cargo trucks and M809 5-ton (6x6) cargo trucks. Also provided by the Australian Government were additional 600 militarized GMC/Chevrolet C-50 medium-duty trucks, GMC C7500 heavy-duty trucks, and International Harvester 7-ton and Dodge 7-ton commercial trucks with 100 trailers assembled in Australian plants.

== Uniforms and insignia ==
The Cambodian Army owed its origin and traditions to the Khmer colonial ARK and CEFEO troops on French service of the First Indochina War, and even after the United States took the role as the main foreign sponsor for the Khmer National Armed Forces at the beginning of the 1970s, French military influence was still perceptible in their uniforms and insignia.

=== Service dress and field uniforms ===
The basic Royal Cambodian Army (ARK) work uniform for all-ranks was a local copy of the French Army's tropical working dress (French: Tenue de toile kaki clair Mle 1945), consisting of a light khaki cotton shirt and pants modelled after the WWII US Army tropical "Chino" khaki working dress. The M1945 shirt had a six-buttoned front, two patch breast pockets closed by clip-cornered straight flaps and shoulder straps (French: Epaulettes) whilst the M1945 "Chino" pants featured two pleats at the front hips. In alternative, the short-sleeved M1946 (French: Chemisette kaki clair Mle 1946), which featured two pleated breast pockets closed by pointed flaps or the "Chino"-style M1949 (French: Chemisette kaki clair Mle 1949) shirts could be worn; a long-sleeved version also existed, based on the French M1948 shirt (French: Chemise kaki clair Mle 1948). Shorts (French: Culotte courte kaki clair Mle 1946) were also issued and worn according to weather conditions. In the field, Cambodian officers and enlisted men wore French all-arms M1947 drab green fatigues (French: Treillis de combat Mle 1947).

ARK Officers received the standard FARK summer service dress uniform in khaki cotton, which was patterned after the French Army M1946/56 khaki dress uniform (French: Vareuse d'officier Mle 1946/56 et Pantalon droit Mle 1946/56); for formal occasions, a light summer version in white cotton (which was the standard FARK full dress uniform) was also issued. The open-collar jacket had two pleated breast pockets closed by pointed flaps and two unpleated at the side closed by straight ones whilst the sleeves had false turnbacks; the front fly and pocket flaps were secured by gilt buttons. The uniform was worn with a matching Khaki shirt and black tie on service dress whereas the white version was worn with a white shirt and a black tie instead.

After March 1970, as part of the U.S.-sponsored MAP re-equipment program, the Cambodian Army (ANK) was provided with new American olive green tropical uniforms, the U.S. Army OG-107 utilities and the M1967 Jungle Utility Uniform, which quickly replaced the older ARK khaki working uniform and the drab green French fatigue clothing. As with the ARVN and the Royal Lao Army (RLA), the Cambodians soon produced their own interesting variety of versions of these jungle utilities or had tailors to modify them to suit their tastes and needs, with mix-and-match combinations being far from uncommon; it was not infrequent to see Cambodian male and female soldiers wearing an OG-107 shirt accompanied by a pair of M1967 Jungle Utility trousers. The OG-107 trousers were often converted by the addition of cargo pouches; shirts and jackets had their sleeves cut at elbow level, shoulder straps were added, single-buttoned pocket flaps could be replaced by two-button versions (with either clip or round corners) or concealed ones, and – a common practice for officers – the addition of a shoulder pocket on the upper left sleeve for ballpoint pens, which were the symbol of authority in Indo-Chinese armed forces. Sometimes fatigue shirts were converted into light bush jackets by adding two-buttoned patch pockets on the lower skirt. Olive green U.S. M-1951 field jackets were also issued to all-ranks.

Reflecting the increasing American influence, ANK senior officers adopted in 1970–71 a new dress uniform, which consisted of an Olive Green tunic and slacks worn with a white shirt and black tie. The cut of the four-buttoned tunic was a hybrid design resembling both the U.S. Army M-1954 "Class A" green dress and the earlier French-style M1946/56 khaki dress; it had two pleated breast pockets closed by pointed flaps and two unpleated at the side closed by straight ones whilst the sleeves had false turnbacks. The front fly and pocket flaps were secured by gilt buttons bearing the combined service emblem of the FANK General Headquarters. Female personnel were issued a service and working olive green OG-107-style short-sleeved blouse based on their male counterparts' versions, except that the blouse's front fly closed on the left side, being provided with two patch breast pockets closed by straight or pointed flaps and shoulder straps. The blouse was worn with a matching service and working olive green knee-length skirt.

=== Camouflage uniforms ===
French "Lizard" (French: Ténue Leopard) camouflage M1947/51, M1947/52 and M1947/53-54 TAP jump-smocks and M1947/52 TTA vests with matching trousers were issued to ARK airborne troops since the 1950s, though later shortages in the early 1970s limited its use to officers and NCOs only. Enlisted-rank paratroopers received a locally produced spotted camouflage uniform (known as the "Spot pattern") during the 1960s, which consisted of olive green and russet blotches on a pale green background. After 1970, "Highland" (ERDL 1948 Leaf pattern or "Woodland") and Tigerstripe patterns of U.S., Thailand (Thai Tadpole), and South Vietnamese (Tadpole Sparse) origin were also provided to the ANK, to which were soon added Cambodian-made copies. Cambodian students that attended the Para-Commando course at the Batujajar Airborne Commando School, near Bandung in Indonesia between March–November 1972, received the Indonesian Army's "flowing blood" (Indonesian language: Loreng Darah Mengalir) camouflage fatigues.

=== Headgear ===
The most common headgear for ARK/ANK all-ranks was a lightweight beret made of light khaki cotton cloth surnamed the "gourka", adopted by the French Army as the M1946 (French: Bérét de toile kaki clair Mle 1946) during the First Indochina War, who copied it from a tropical beret pattern previously worn by British troops in the Far East during WWII. Berets were worn pulled to the left in French fashion, with the colour sequence as follows: General Service – Light Khaki, Armoured Corps – Black, Paratroopers and Para-Commandos – Cherry-red (Maroon), Military Police and Regional Gendarmerie – Dark Blue; after 1970, ANK officers and enlisted men received Light Olive Drab, Black or Dark Green woollen berets, with the Special Forces adopting a Rifle Green beret, though berets made of "Tigerstripe" and "Highland" camouflage cloth were also issued to elite units. With the exception of the light khaki and camouflage versions – which were manufactured in three pieces –, all other corps' berets were made of wool in a single piece attached to a black (or tan) leather rim provided with two black tightening straps at the back, following the French M1946 (French: Bérét Mle 1946) or M1953/59 models (French: Bérét Mle 1953/59); these were usually worn with either the standard FANK shield-shaped, embroidered beret flash patterned after the Khmer Republic flag or the standard FANK beret badge, a miniature version of the ANK emblem issued in both embroidered and gilt or silver metal versions. French M1946 and M1957 light khaki sidecaps (French: Bonnet de police de toile kaki clair Mle 1946 and Bonnet de police de toile kaki clair Mle 1957) were also adopted by the ARK, but seldom used.

ARK officers received a light khaki service peaked cap based on the French M1927 pattern (French: Casquette d'officier Mle 1927) to wear with the khaki service dress, whilst a white summer top version was worn with the FARK white full dress uniform; both versions were worn with a gilded metal FARK cap badge bearing the royal coat-of-arms. After March 1970 these caps were replaced by an Olive Green version – incidentally, the change of colour made it to resemble more the U.S. M1954 Visor Cap – for wear with the new Americanized dress uniform adopted by the ANK, worn with a new distinctive gilded metal FANK cap badge now bearing the Khmer Republic coat-of-arms. An olive green sidecap was adopted by female personnel to wear with their Olive Green service and working uniform.

In the field, ARK officers and enlisted men wore a mixture of badgeless light khaki tropical berets, U.S. M-1951 cotton field caps, French M1949 bush hats (French: Chapeau de brousse Mle 1949), and privately purchased civilian bucket hats in Khaki or OG cotton cloth. Later, a khaki patrol cap resembling a simplified baseball cap version was adopted as the standard ANK fatigue headgear for all-ranks, though the South Vietnamese ARVN fatigue cap in OG cotton cloth, whose shape recalled the U.S. Marines utility cap, was sometimes seen. In addition, a wide range of OG or camouflage Boonie hats and baseball caps also found their way into the ANK from the U.S., South Vietnam and Thailand though they never displaced entirely the earlier headgear. Period photos do show that the old French bush hat remained popular with the troops, who also wore Cambodian-, Thai- or South Vietnamese-made versions in Olive Green, Khaki and camouflage cloth.

Steel helmets, in the form of the U.S. M-1 and French M1951 NATO (French: casque Mle 1951 OTAN) models were standard issue in the ARK, with paratroopers receiving either the U.S. M-1C jump helmet and its respective French-modified versions (French: Casque USM1 TAP type Métropole and Casque USM1 TAP type EO) or the airborne pattern of the French M1951 helmet, the M1951 TAP (French: Casque type TAP, modéle 1951). During the Republic, the ANK standardized on the M-1 model 1964 provided with the U.S. Army M59 Mitchell "Clouds" camouflage pattern cover, though some units retained the older U.S. and French steel helmets throughout the war. ARK armoured crews received the French M1951 and M1958/65 dark olive green leather crash helmets (French: Sous-casque radio-char modéle 1951, Sous-casque radio-char modéle 1958 and Sous-casque radio-char modéle 1965); after 1970, Cambodian M113 APC crewmen were issued the fibreglass U.S. Combat Vehicle Crew (CVC) T-56-6 helmet (dubbed the "bone dome"), though neither models offered any satisfactory protection against shrapnel or small arms rounds.

=== Footwear ===
White low laced leather shoes were worn with the FARK white cotton full dress, with brown shoes being prescribed to wear with the khaki working uniform, and later, black ones with the new ANK OG dress uniform. On the field, all Army personnel wore brown leather U.S. M-1943 Combat Service Boots and French M1953 "Rangers" (French: Rangers modéle 1953) or French Pataugas olive canvas-and-rubber jungle boots, white low tennis shoes, flip-flops and leather peasant sandals; paratroopers received the calf-length French M1950 or M1950/53 TAP (French: Bottes de saut modéle 1950 et 1950/53) brown or black leather jump-boot models. After 1970, the ANK standardized on the American black leather M-1967 model with DMS "ripple" pattern rubbler sole and Jungle boots, Canadian Bata tropical boots and South Vietnamese black canvas-and-rubber Indigenous Combat Boots, which replaced much of the older combat footwear.

=== Army Ranks ===
In deep contrast to the South Vietnamese ARVN and Laotian FAR, who replaced the French-style military ranks previously worn during the colonial period with their own devised rank insignia after 1954, the standard FARK rank chart continued to follow closely the French pattern. The Cambodian Armed Forces' system of military ranks was almost identical to the sequence laid out by the French Army 1956 regulations and common to all branches of service, differing only in some details.

Removable stiffened shoulder boards (French: pattes d'épaule) were worn by officers on their dress uniforms as per in the French practice, except that Cambodian Generals’ (French: Officiers géneraux) wore their stars above gold laurel-like leaf embroidery on the outer edge, and a miniature royal coat-of-arms featuring a combined crown-and-crossed swords device was incorporated on the inner end of the shoulder boards for all-ranks. The colour sequence of the FARK shoulder boards also varied according to the arm of service: general service – very dark blue or black; airborne troops – light green; medical corps – maroon. On both the khaki working and olive green (OG) field uniforms, Generals' and senior officers' ranks (French: Officiers supérieures) were usually worn on shoulder strap slides (French: passants d'épaule) but, if the issued combat jacket or shirt was not provided with buttoned shoulder straps, a single chest tab (French: patte de poitrine) pinned to the front fly following French practice could be worn instead. As for senior (French: Officiers subalternes) and junior NCOs (French: Sous-officiers), they wore metal or cloth chevrons pinned to the chest; NCOs serving in combat units were entitled to wear their chevrons pointed upwards whereas their counterparts assigned to non-combatant, rear-echelon support formations had to wear their chevrons pointed downwards. Privates (French: Hommes de troupe) wore no insignia.

This basic system was maintained during the Republic, though standard black shoulder boards without the royal crest were adopted in 1970 for all services and from 1972 onwards some Cambodian officers began wearing metal pin-on collar rank insignia, obviously inspired by American practice. Although the system of military ranks remained unchanged, the rank of Marshal (French: Maréchal) was created in 1970 for the President of the Khmer Republic and FANK Commander-in-Chief Lon Nol.

=== Rank insignia ===
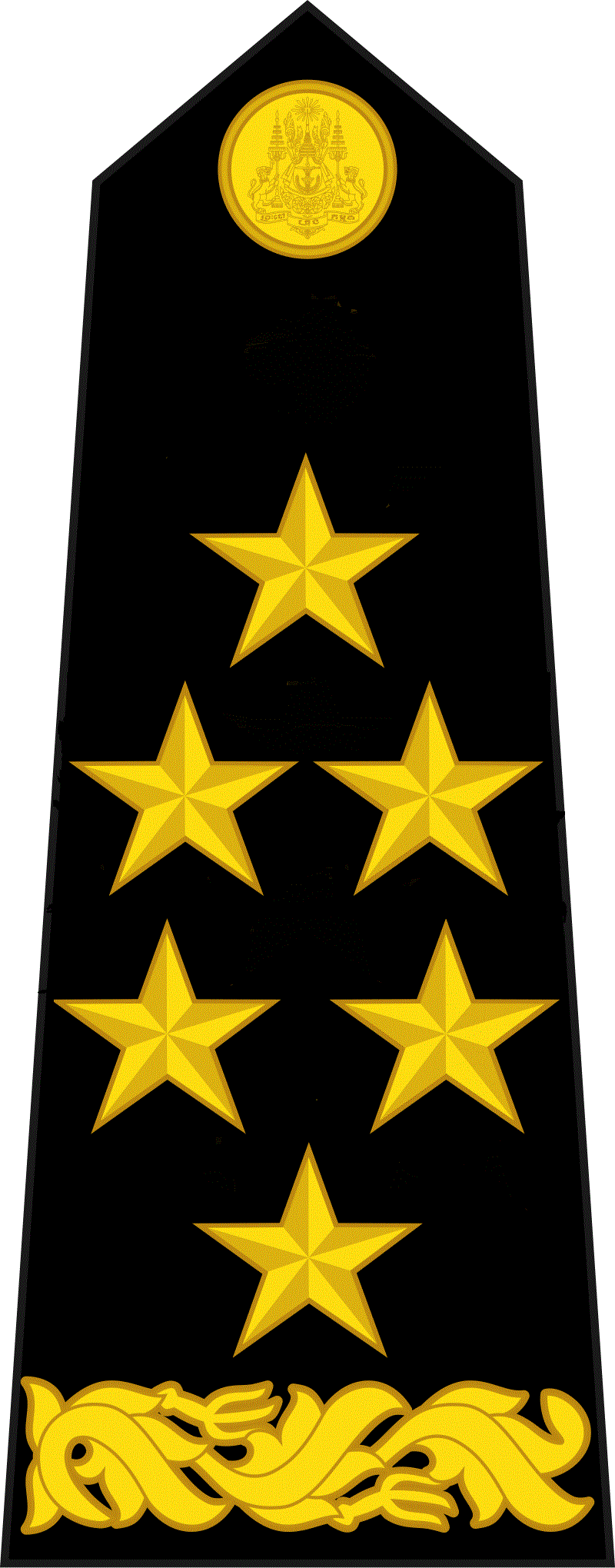
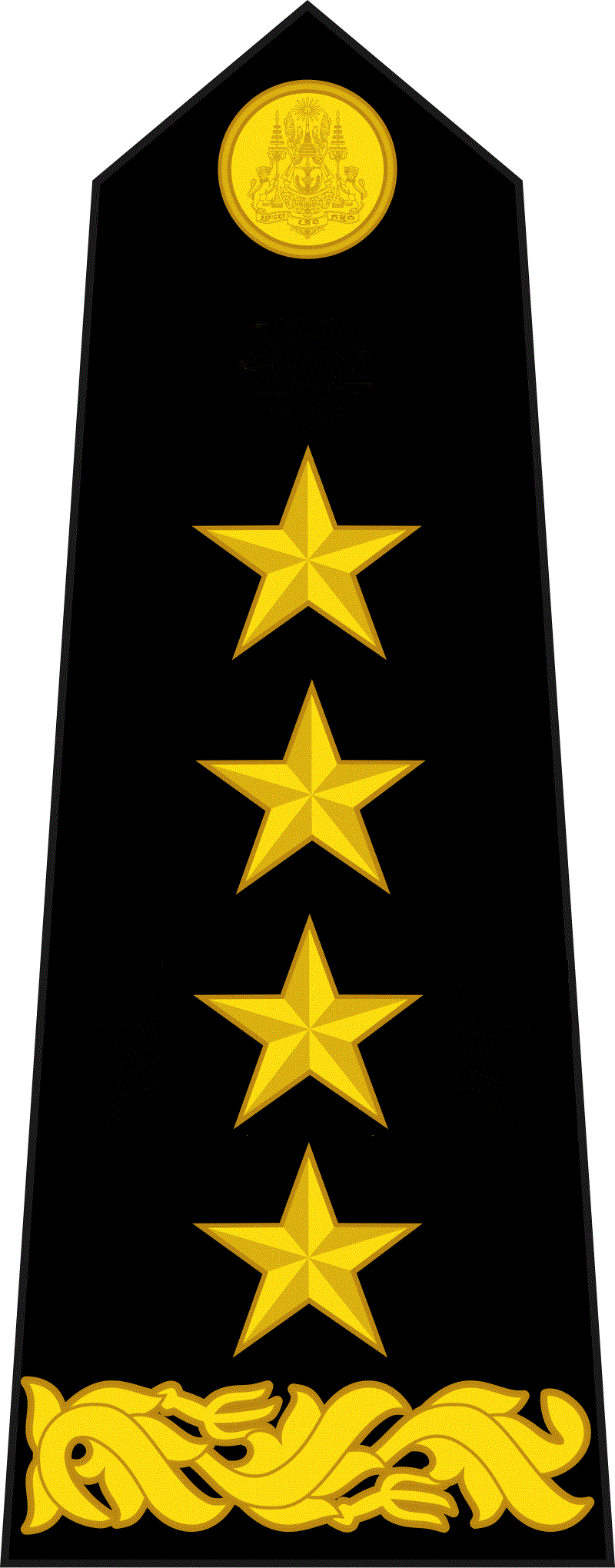
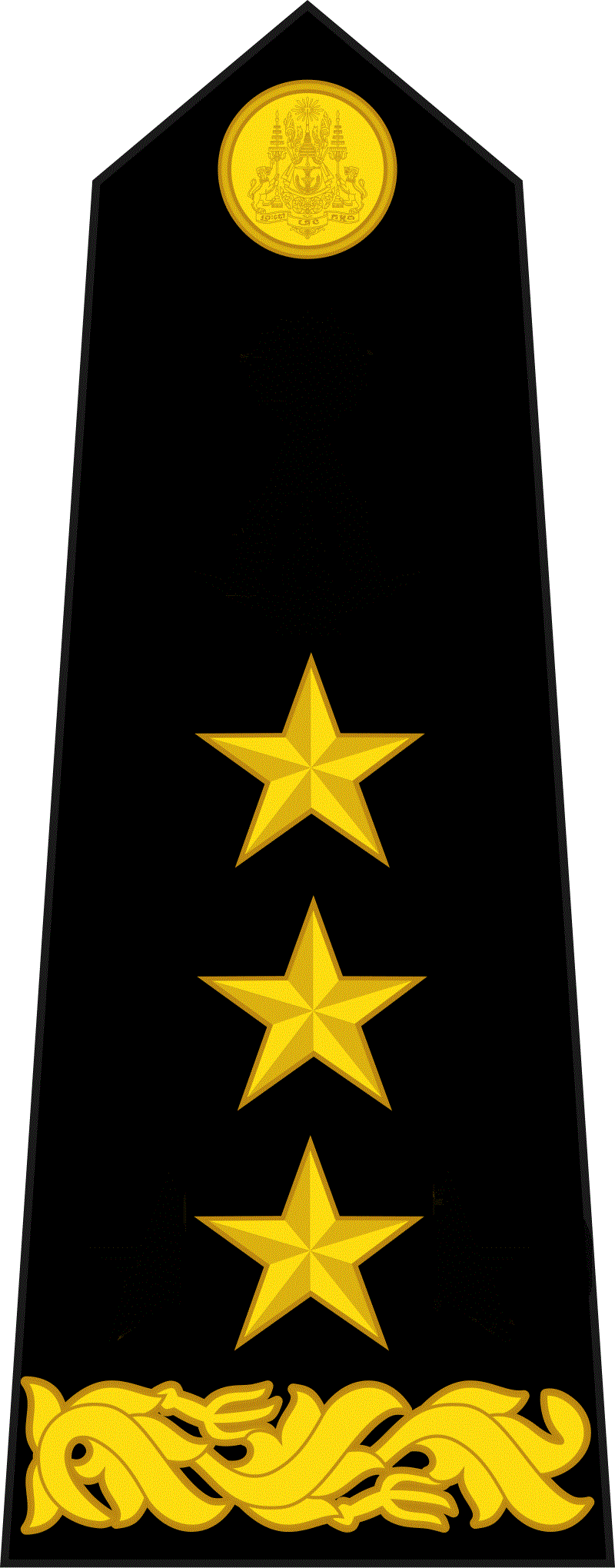
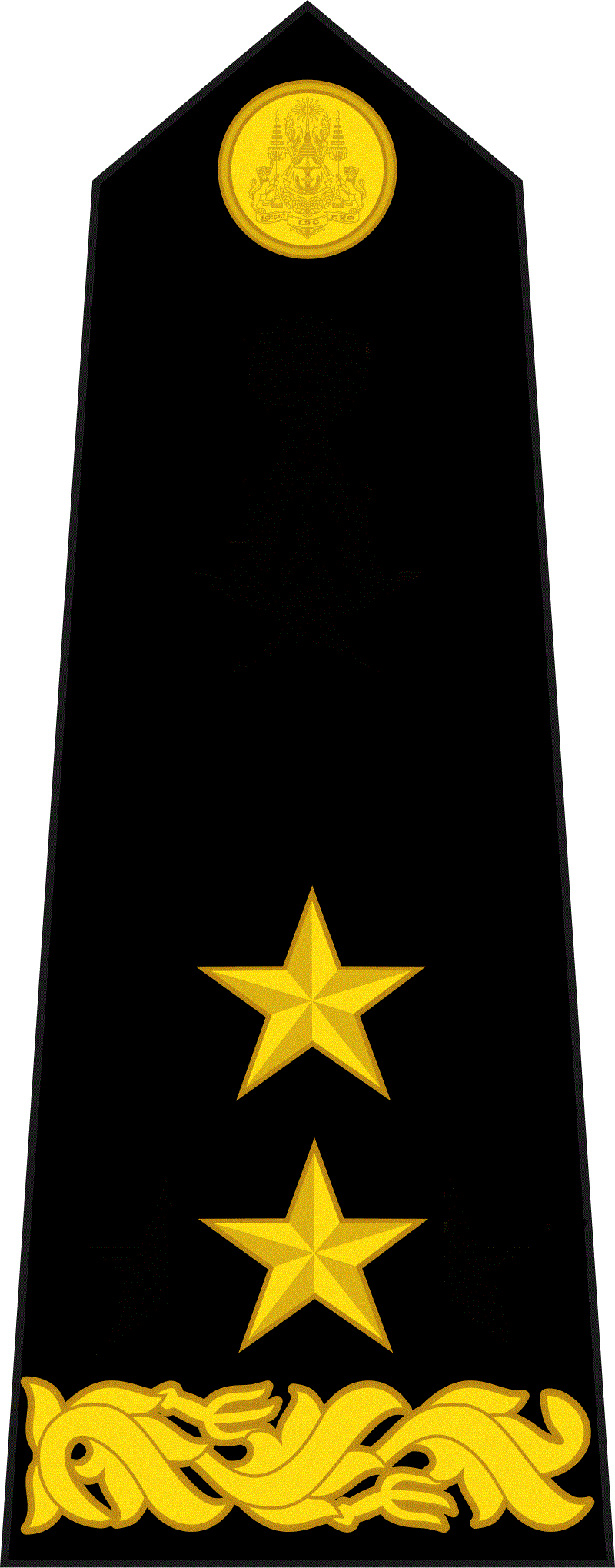
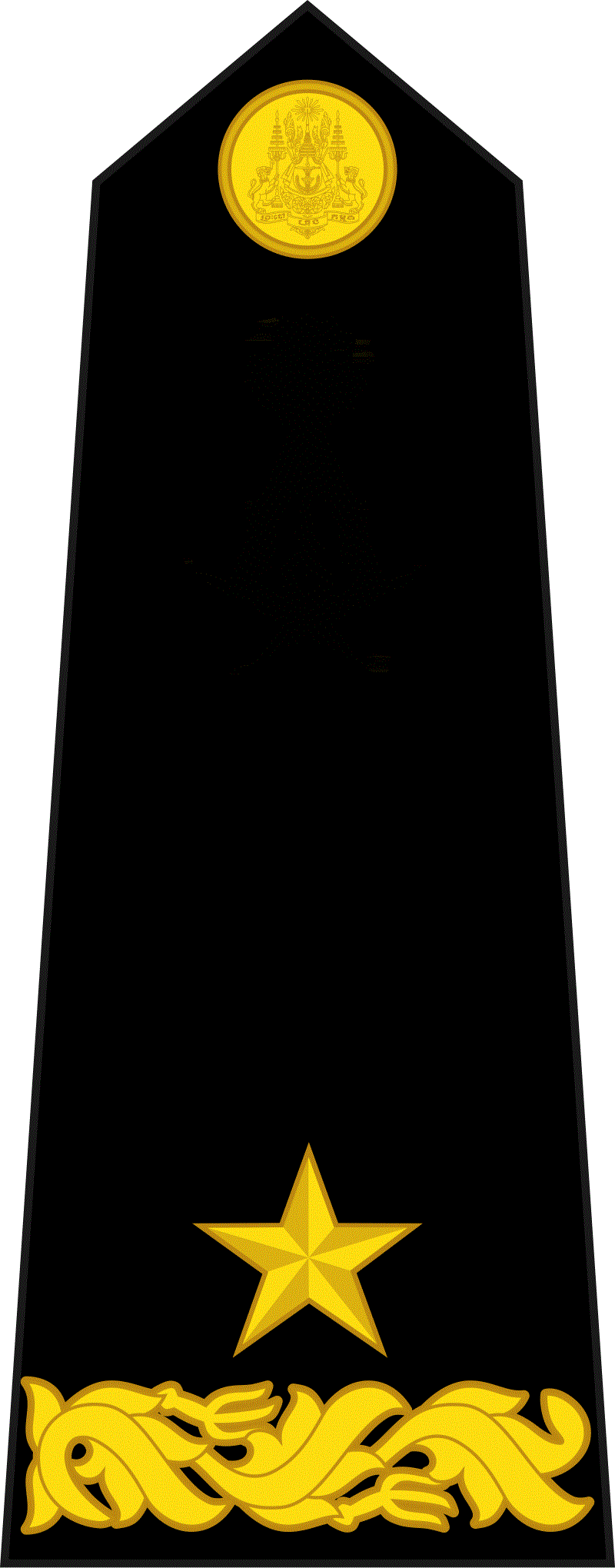
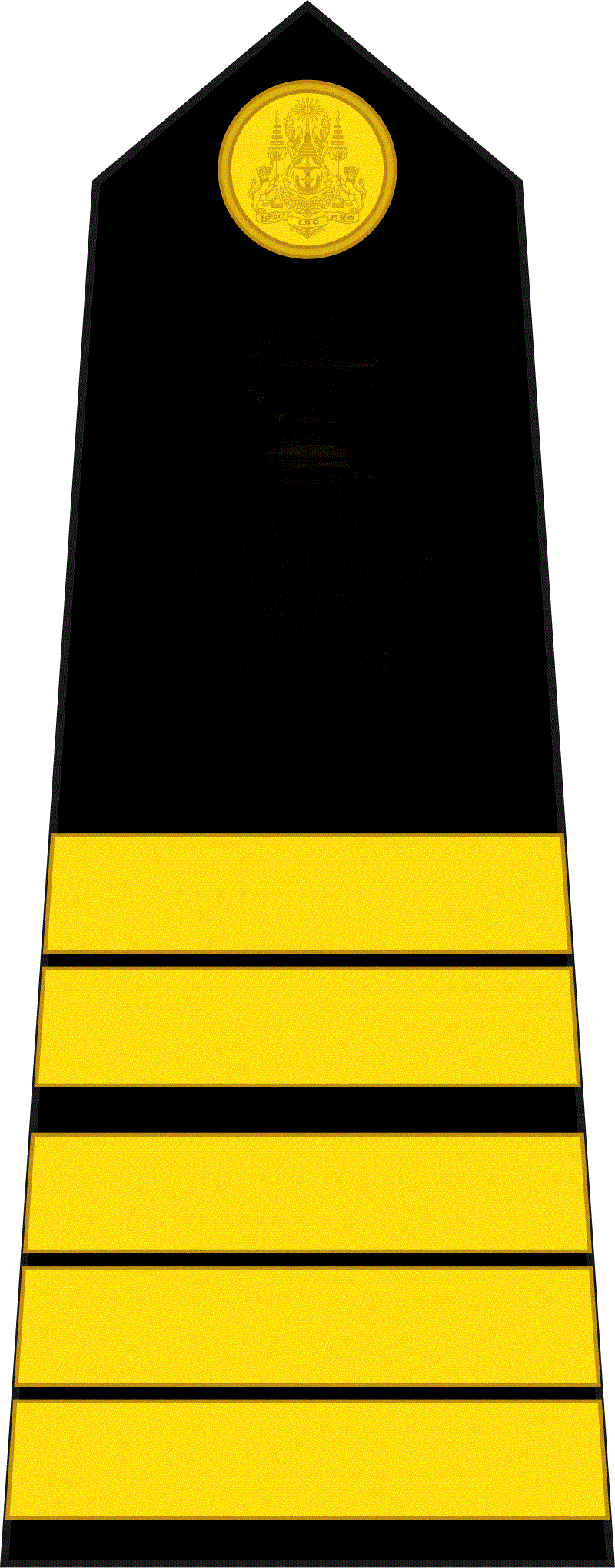
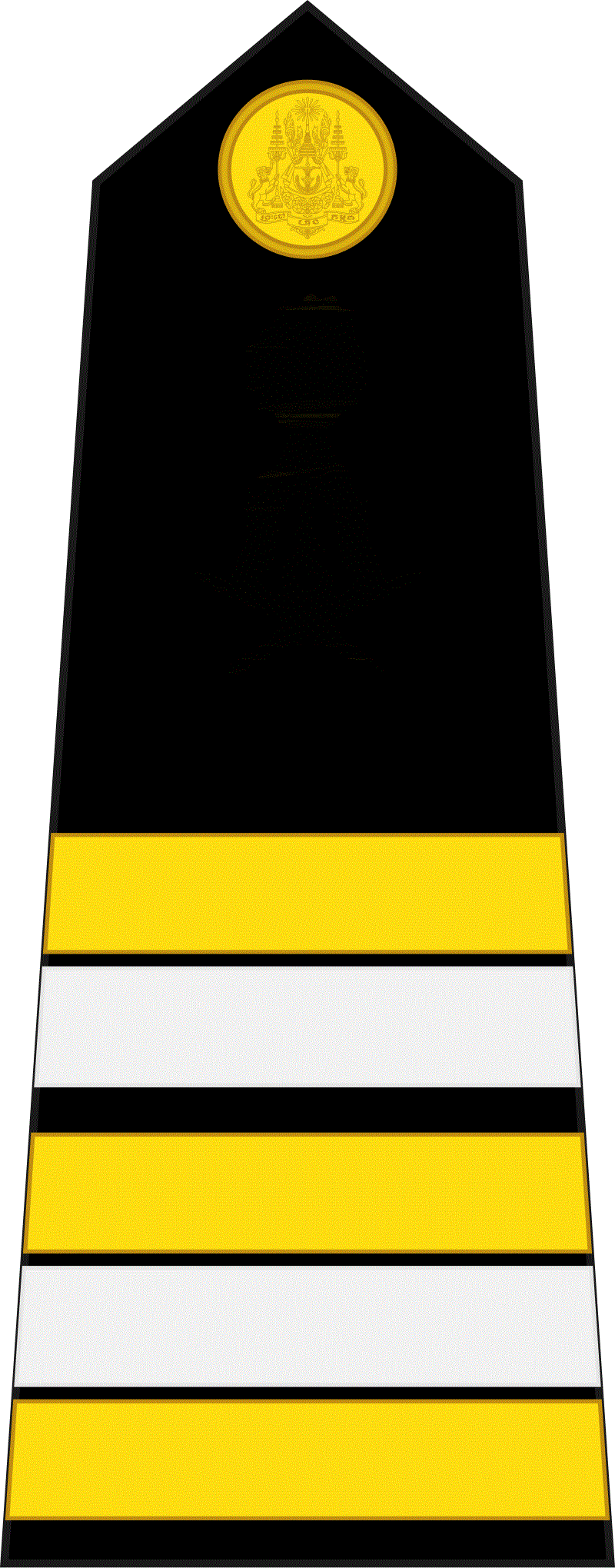
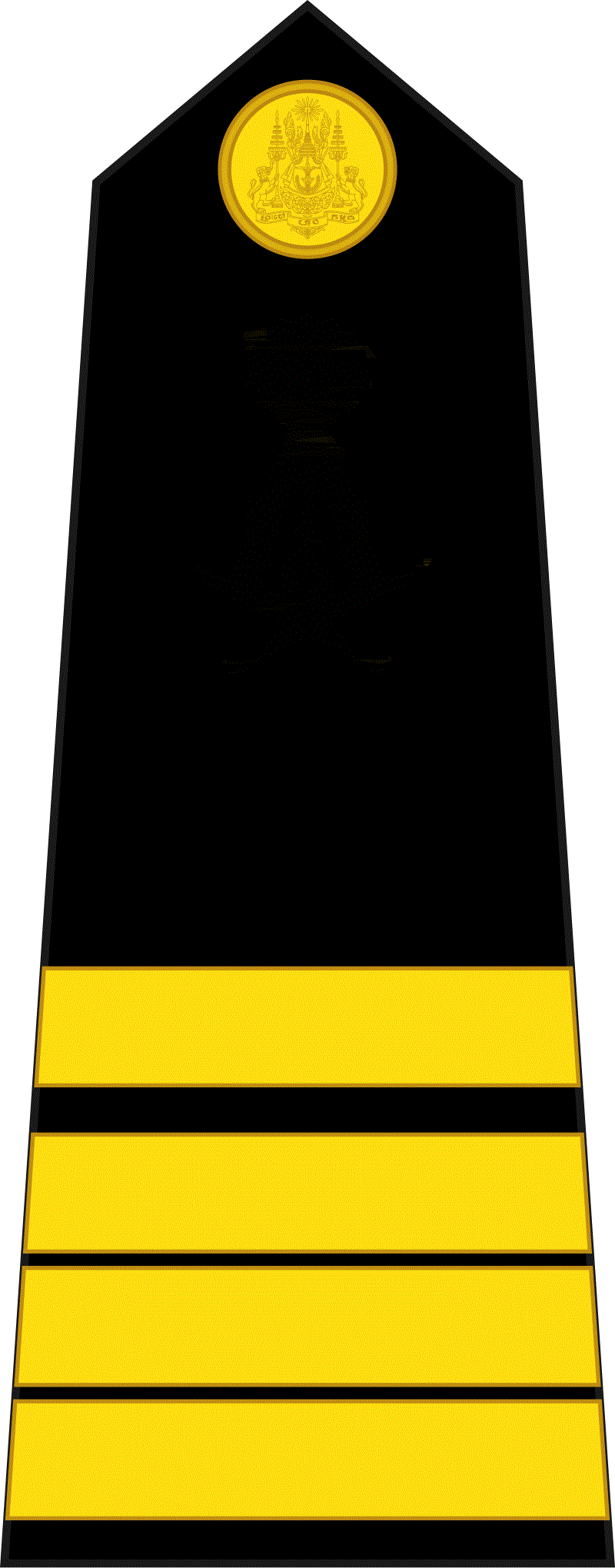
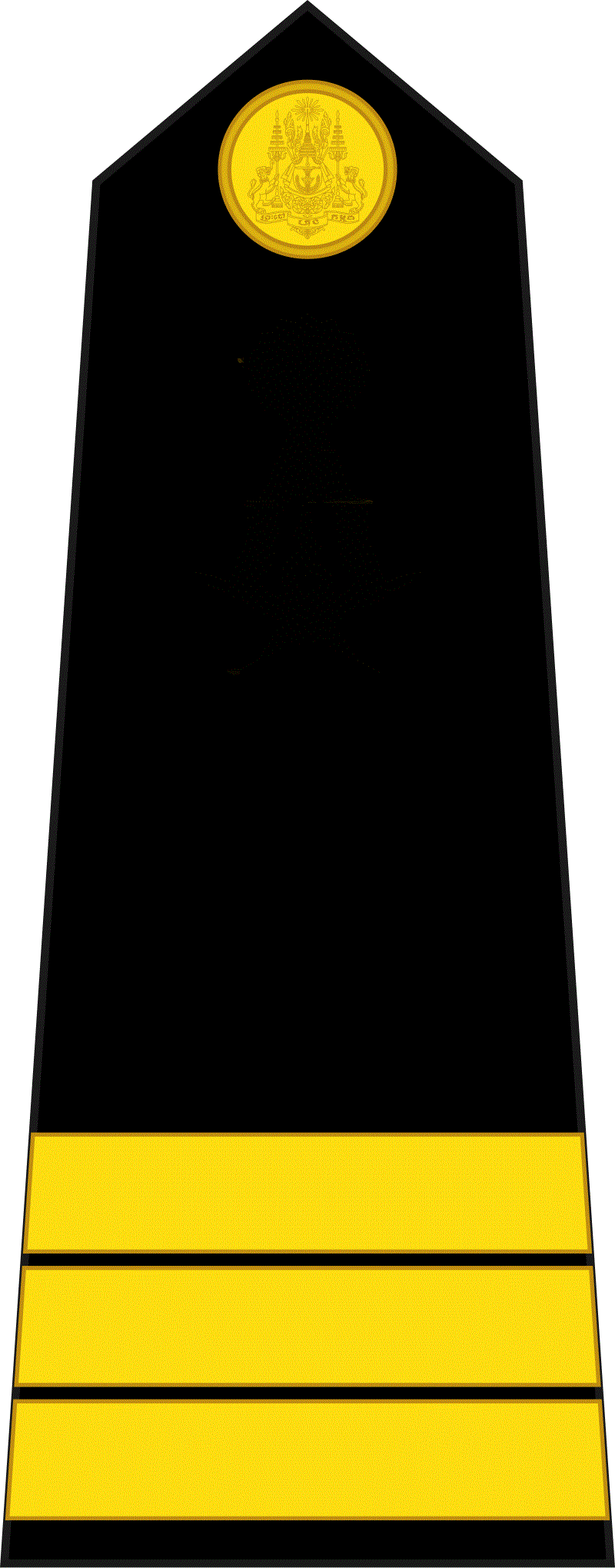
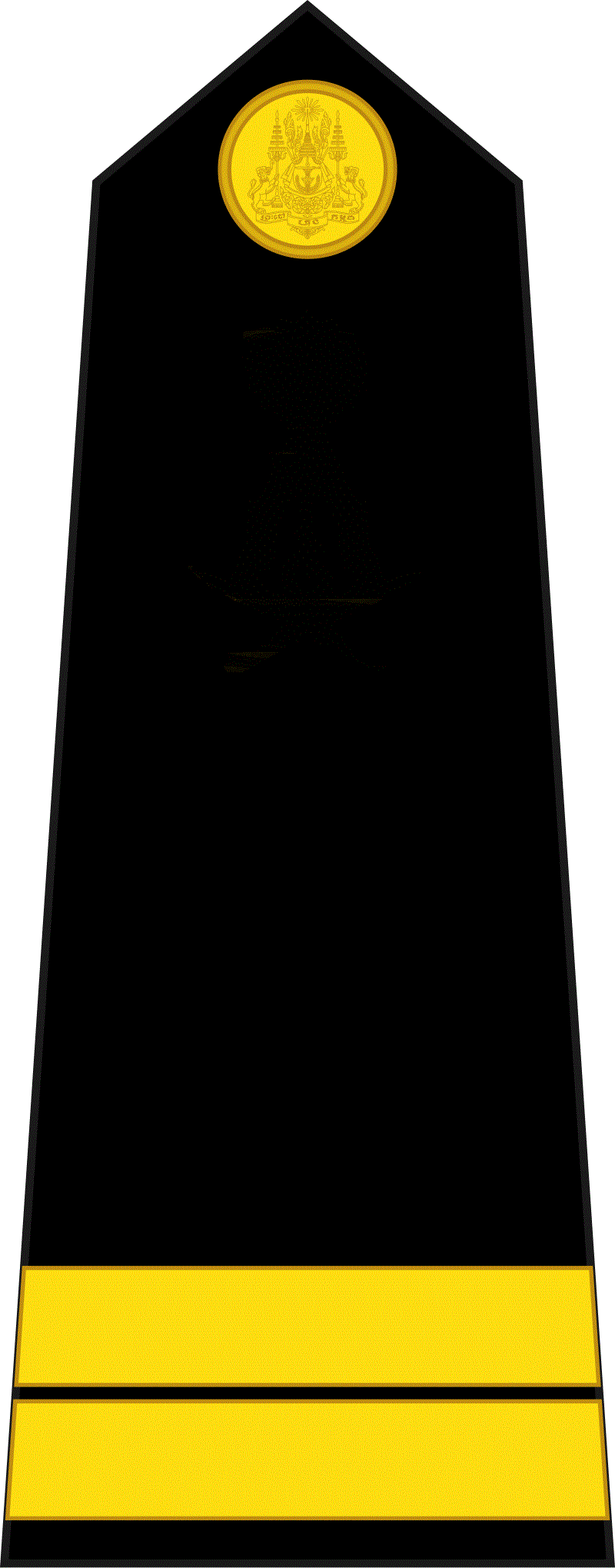
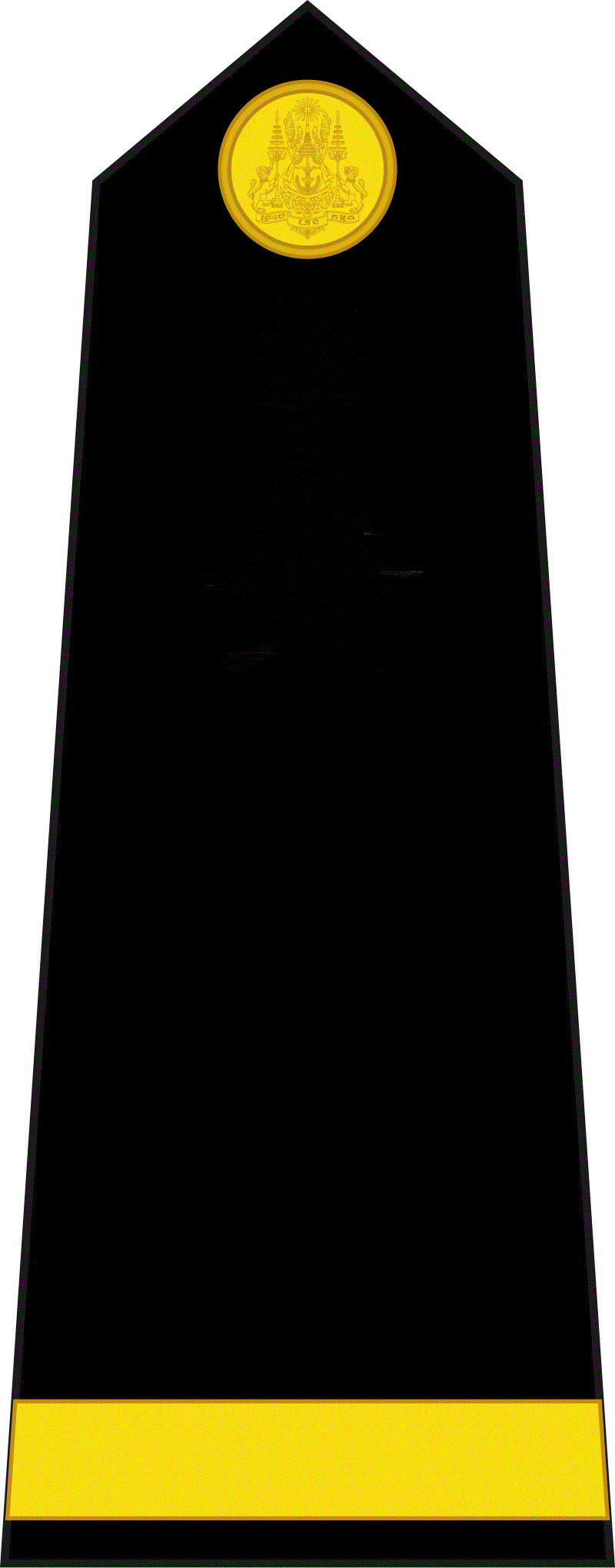
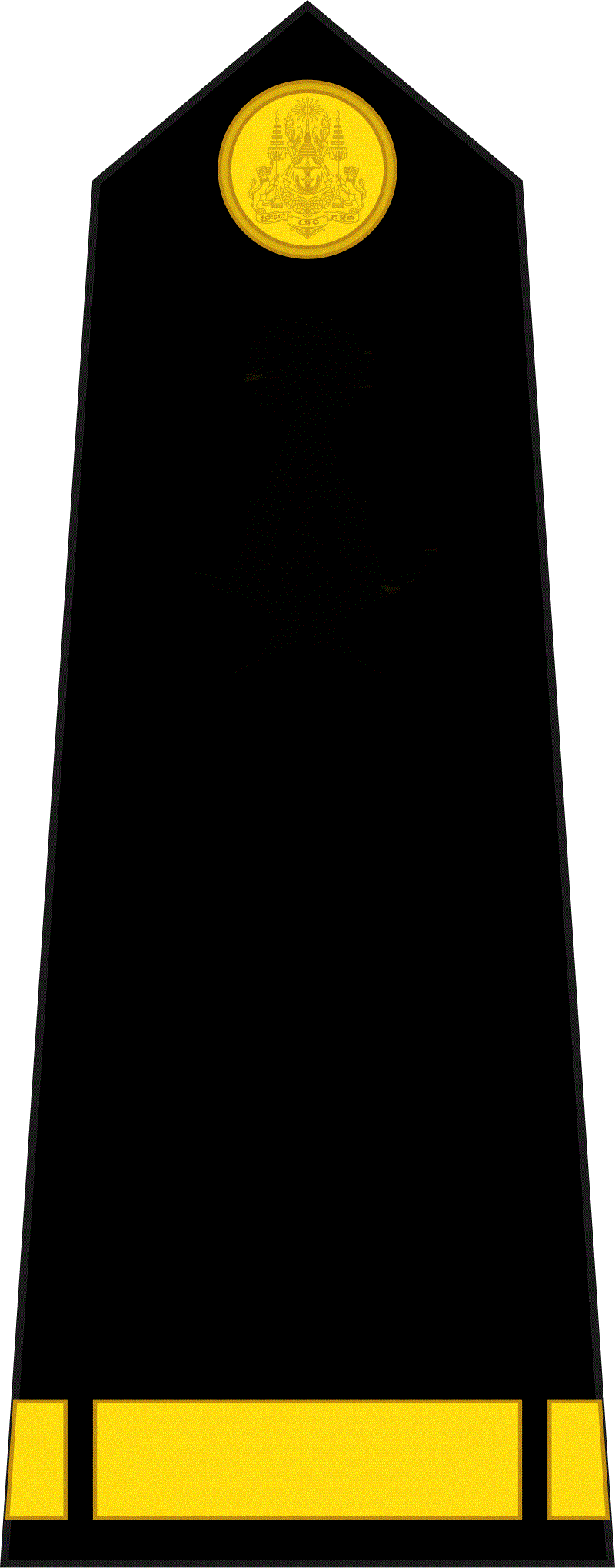
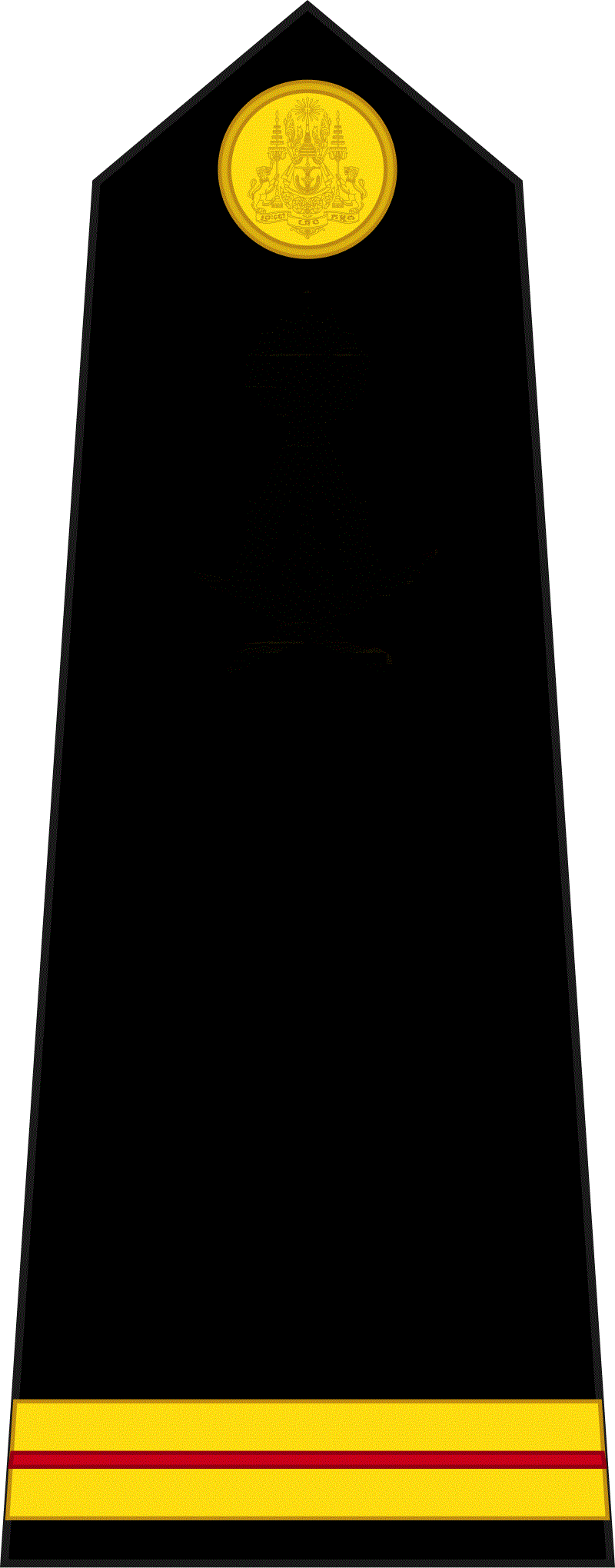
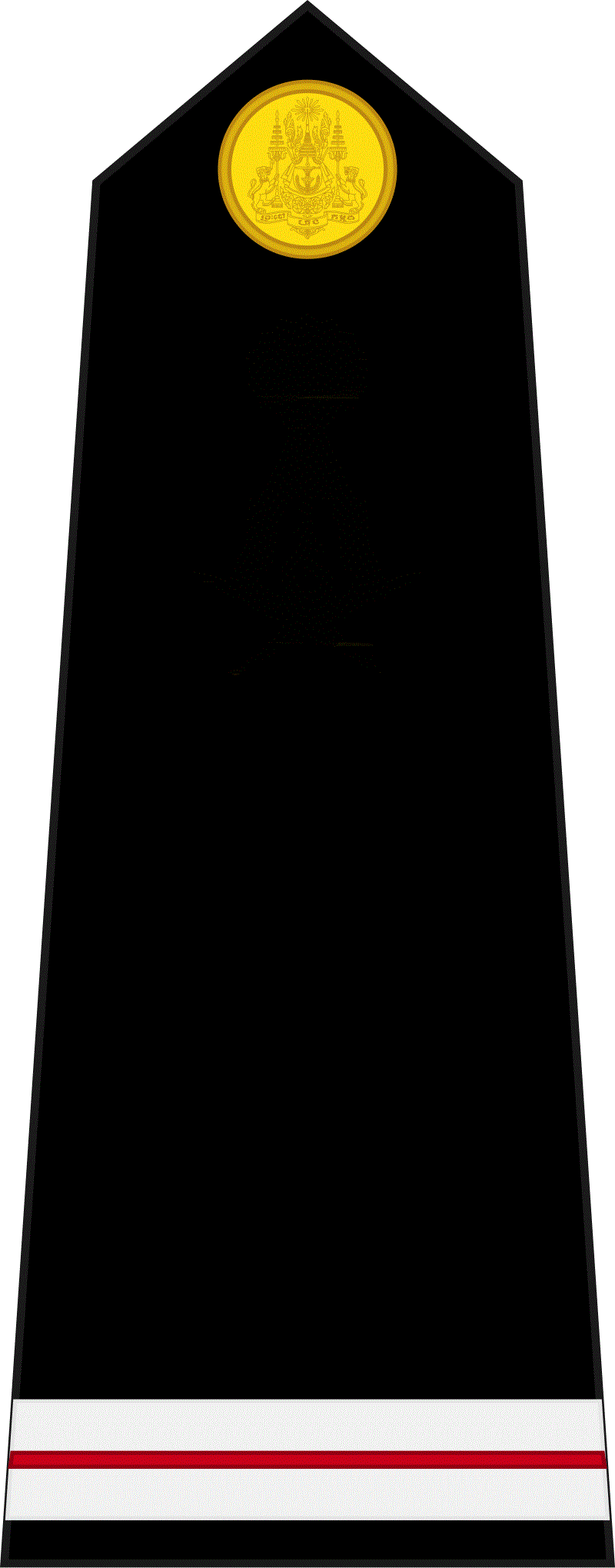
(Khmer Republic) Khmer National Army
(Khmer Republic) Khmer National Army	Maréchal; Senabramoukh	Général; Utdɑm nieyʊək	Lieutenant Général; Utdɑm aek	Major Général; Utdɑm too	Général de brigade Utdɑm trəy	Colonel; Vorak aek	Lieutenant-Colonel; Vorak too	Commandant; Vorak trəy	Capitaine; Aknu aek	Lieutenant; Aknu too	Sous-lieutenant; Aknu trəy	Aspirant; Prɨn baal aek	Adjudant-chef; Prɨn baal too	Adjudant; Pʊəl baal aek

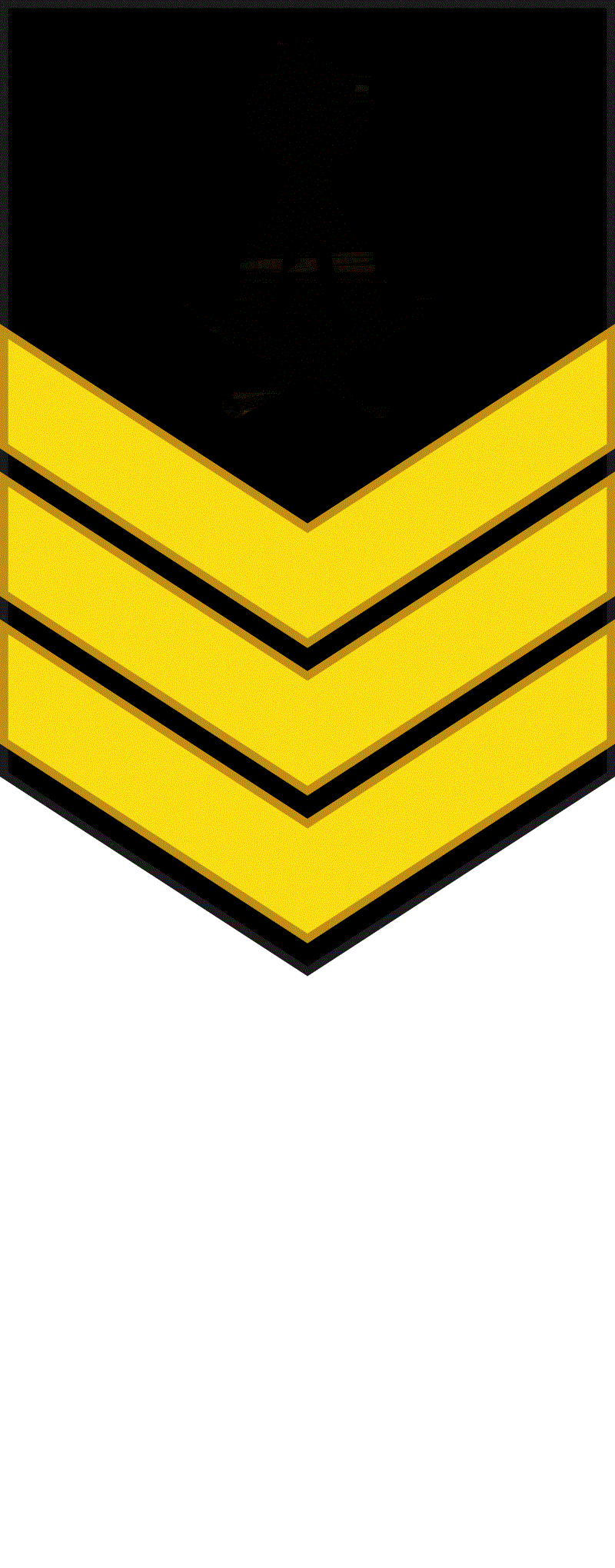
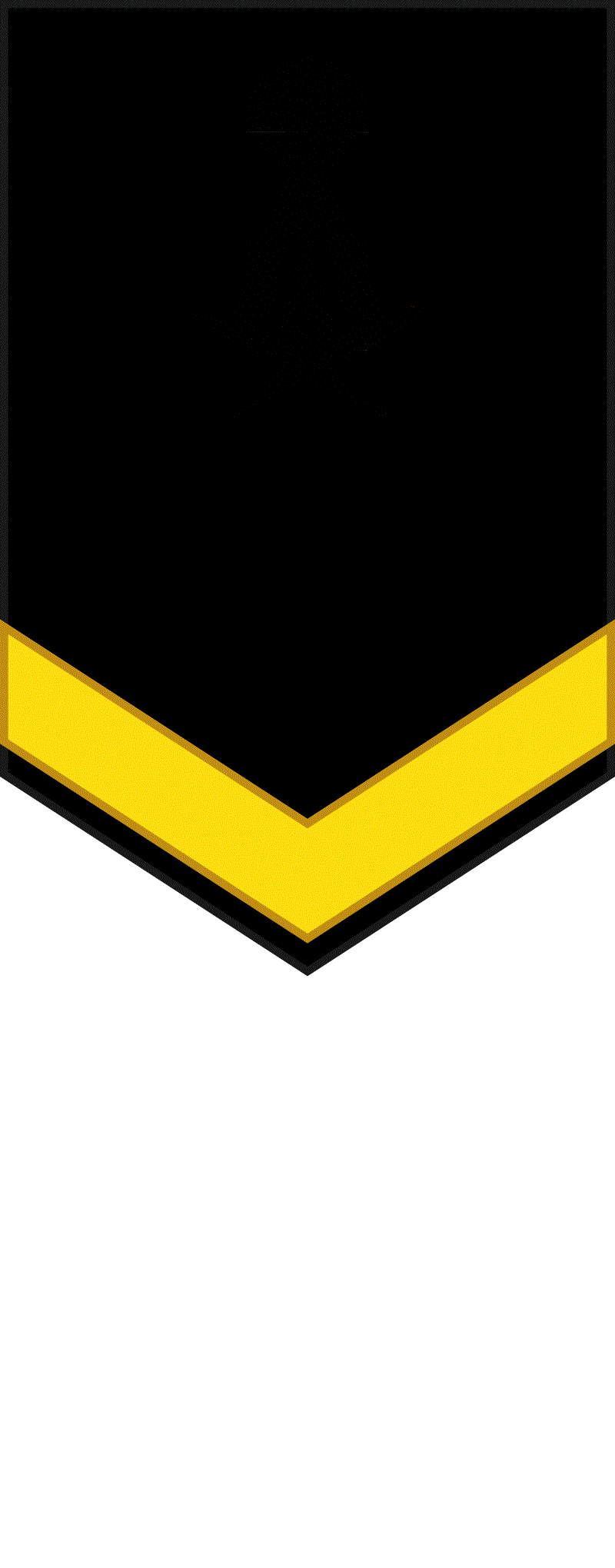
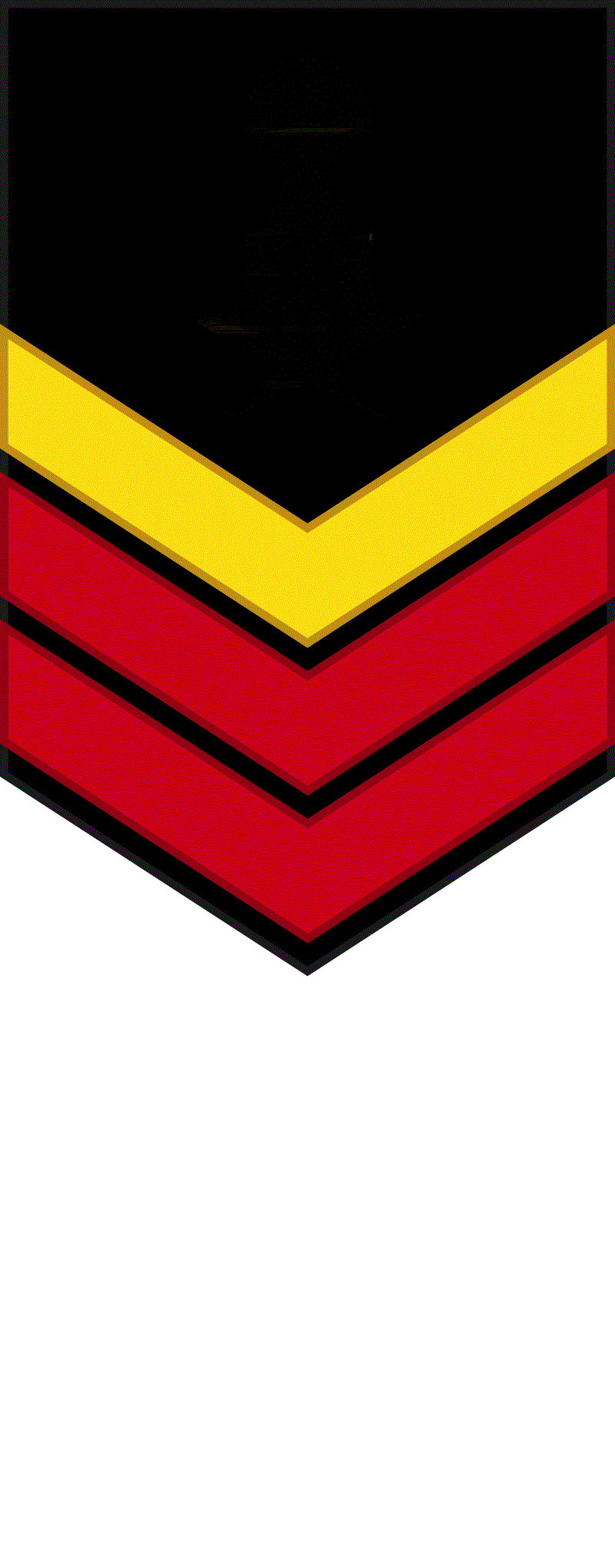
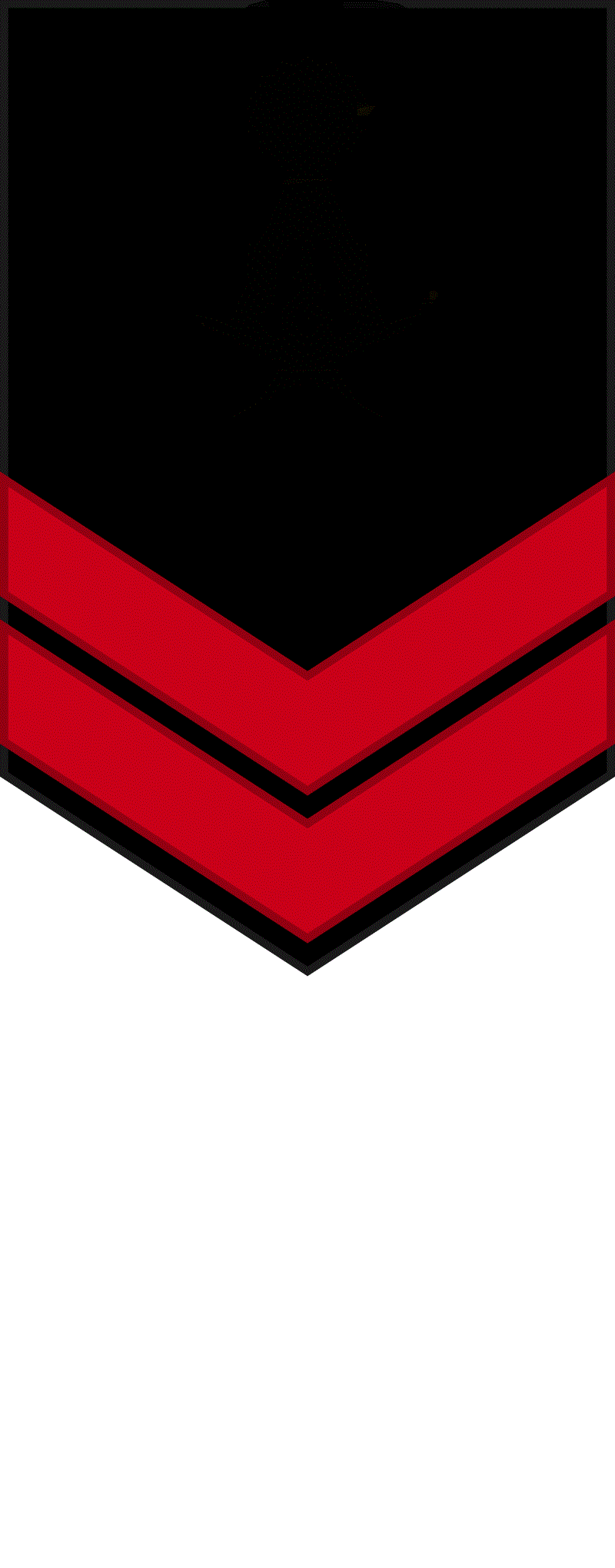
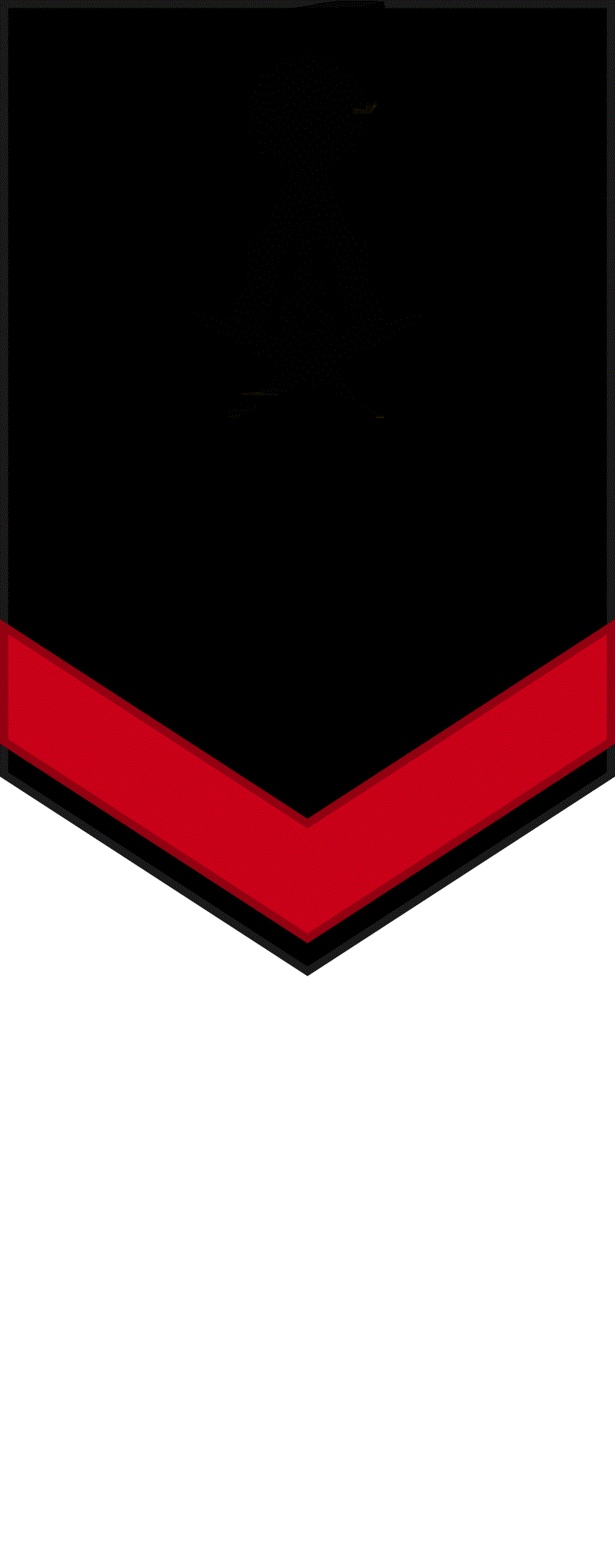
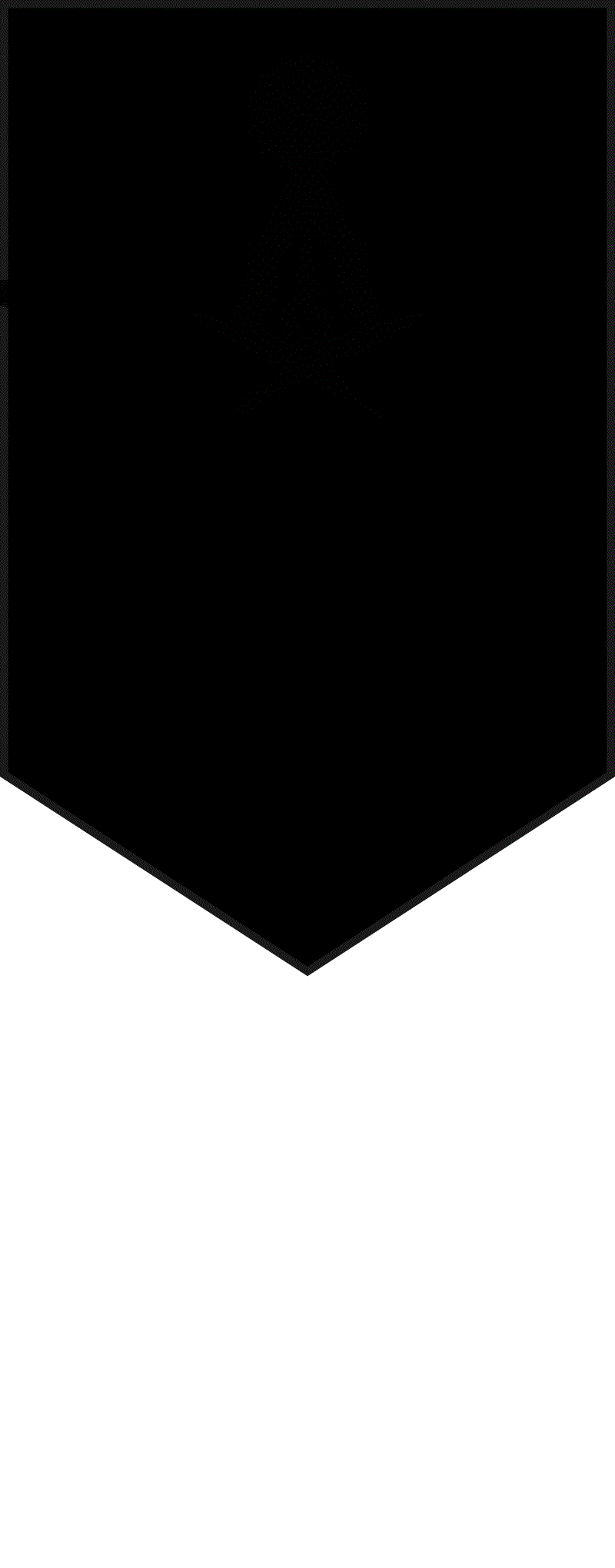
(Khmer Republic) Khmer National Army
(Khmer Republic) Khmer National Army	Sergent-chef; Pʊəl baal too	Sergent; Pʊəl baal trəy	Caporal-chef; Niey aek	Caporal; Niey too	Soldat de première classe Pʊəl aek	Soldat de deuxième classe Pʊəl too

=== Branch insignia ===
ARK skill and trade badges came in gilt metal and/or ennamelled pin-on versions, with cloth embroidered yellow or black-on-green subdued variants being introduced after 1970, though branch insignia were less frequently worn in the ANK. On dress and service uniforms, they were displayed on both collars by all-ranks if shoulder boards were worn, but in the field officers did not wore them on the shirt or jacket collars if metal pin-on collar rank insignia was being worn; enlisted ranks usually wore branch insignia on both collars. In 1972 yellow branch insignia embroidered on green tabs were seen worn over the right pocket, whilst armoured branch insignia in metal and silk woven forms were also worn above the right pocket.

- Infantry (French: Infanterie) – crossed rifles
- Airborne troops (French: Parachutistes or Troupes Aeroportées) – combined crossed rifles and open parachute canopy
- Signals (French: Transmissions)
- Engineer (French: Génie) – stylized Buddhist temple tower
- Artillery (French: Artillerie) – crossed cannons
- Anti-Aircraft (French: Defense Antiaérienne)
- Armoured units (French: Troupes Blindées) – stylized tank facing front inserted on an inverted horseshoe
- Transport (French: Train or Transport) – lightning bolt superimposed upon a flying spinning wheel or cutter
- Medical (French: Service de Santé, or simply Santé) – caduceus superimposed upon a red cross
- Military logistics (French: Service de Matériel) – combined winged trident symbolizing the Hindu God Shiva and anchor device, superimposed upon an eight-point star
- Ordnance (French: Munitions) – flaming grenade
- Military Fuel/Petrol, Oil and Lubricants – POL (French: Service de Essence)
- Quartermaster (French: Service de Intendance) – stylized mythical Cambodian swan (Hongsa) holding a key by the beak
- Military Police (French: Prevôtée Militaire or Police Militaire – PM)
- Military Justice (French: Justice Militaire) – combined balance scale and sword pointing upwards
- Social and Cultural Services (French: Services Sociales et Culturelles) – "Shiva" trident inserted on a circular wreath
- Geographic Services (French: Service Geographique) – combined Theodolite and Dumpy level superimposed on a shield
- Veterinary Services (French: Service Vétérinaire) – crown superimposed upon a purple cross

=== Unit insignia ===
Because of resistance by the royal government, the use of unit insignia was discouraged in the ARK and those that were allowed to wear unit crests and insignia, such as the paratroopers, wore them French-style on the left breast suspended from pocket hangers or cloth embroidered versions on the upper left sleeve. Metal and cloth parachutist wings were displayed above the right breast pocket, whilst foreign airborne qualification badges went over the left pocket. Like the South Vietnamese ARVN and the Laotian RLA, the Cambodian Army was given to creating unit insignia for formations even down to the company level and its use became more common in the ANK after 1970, with battalion insignia being worn by all ranks, although its placement varied greatly. When used in conjunction with brigade or Military Region insignia placed on the left shoulder, battalion insignia were worn on the right shoulder or over the right chest pocket, whilst when used in conjunction with divisional or brigade group insignia on the left shoulder, brigade insignia went to the right shoulder. Less frequently, brigade insignia could also be worn on the right pocket.

The FANK General Headquarters combined service patch usually went to the left shoulder, although some senior officers wore instead a gilt metal version of this insignia over the right chest. Cloth subdued nametapes were commonly worn in the ANK usually above the right shirt or jacket pocket on field dress; officers were occasionally seen with black plastic nameplates with white lettering on the left side in the service and dress uniforms.

== See also ==
- Army of the Republic of Vietnam (ARVN)
- Battle of Kampot
- Cambodian Civil War
- Civilian Irregular Defense Group program (CIDG)
- Kampuchea Revolutionary Army
- Kampuchean People's Revolutionary Armed Forces
- Khmer Republic
- Khmer Rouge
- Khmer Krom
- Khmer Serei
- List of weapons of the Cambodian Civil War
- MIKE Force
- Operation Chenla I
- Operation Chenla II
- Operation Freedom Deal
- Operation Prek Ta
- Royal Cambodian Armed Forces
- Royal Cambodian Army
- Royal Gendarmerie of Cambodia
- Royal Lao Armed Forces
