= Sosthène Fernandez =

Cambodian general (1923–2006)

- សូស្តែន ហ្វឺណានដេស

Commander-in-chief of Khmer National Armed Forces
- In office 1970–1975

Personal details
- Born: 28 November 1923 Phnom Penh, Cambodia, French Indochina
- Died: 11 July 2006 (aged 82) France

Military service
- Allegiance: First Kingdom of Cambodia; Khmer Republic
- Branch/service: Royal Cambodian Army; Khmer National Army
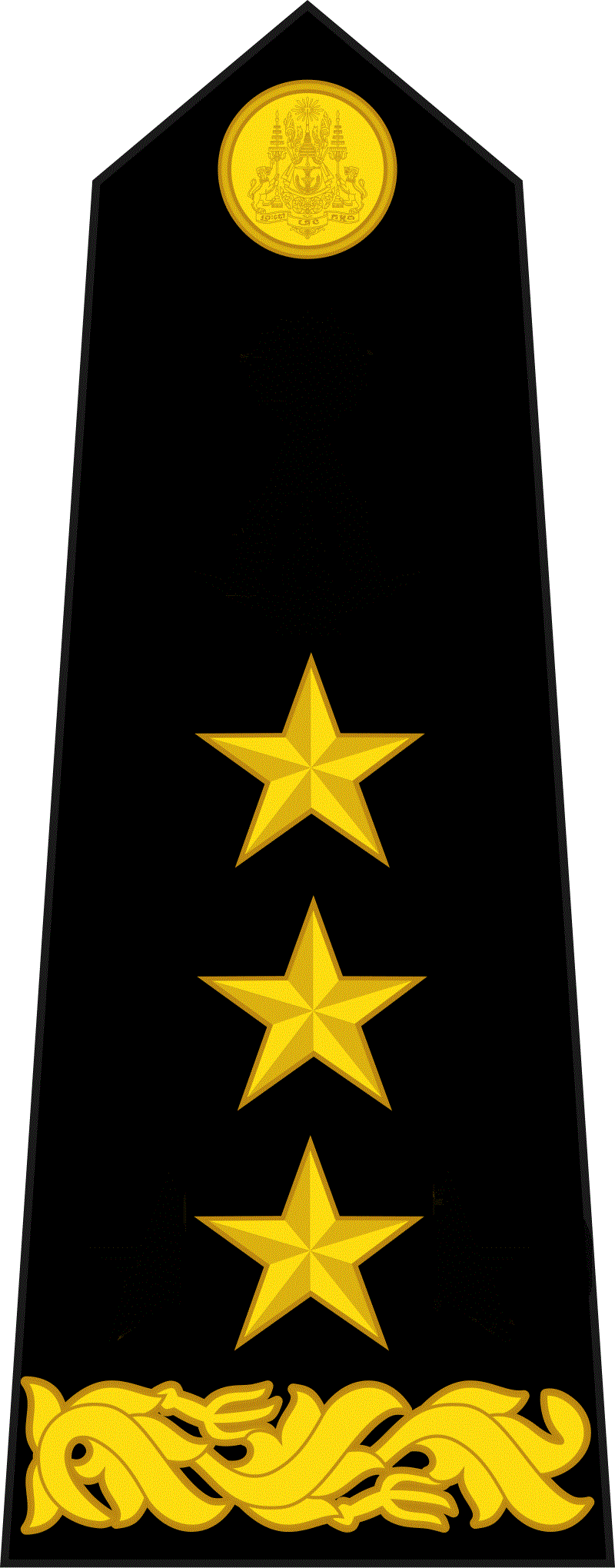
- Rank: Lieutenant general
- Commands: Chief of Police; FANK Chief-of-Staff; Commander-in-Chief of the ANK (1972–1975)

Lieutenant general Sosthène Fernandez (Khmer: សូស្តែន ហ្វឺណានដេស; born on 28 November 1923 in Phnom Penh; died 2006 in France) was the Commander-in-Chief of the Khmer National Armed Forces (FANK) and chief of general staff of the Khmer Republic after Prince Sihanouk was deposed as head of state in 1970. Prior to 1970, he was a prominent politician and a former chief of the police.

== Life and career ==
General Fernandez was born in Phnom Penh to Samson Fernandez, a magistrate and Health and Justice Minister of Filipino descent, and an ethnic Khmer mother born in Vietnam.

A grandson of a band master in the royal court, General Fernandez's Filipino roots traces back to San Narciso in the Philippine province of Zambales. King Norodom I made a royal visit to the Philippines in 1872, and brought with him Filipino musicians on his return to Cambodia. Among them was Ángel Labrador Fernández, a native of San Narciso, and a maestro who helped form and train the Royal Reed and Brass Band for King Norodom's court. Ángel's son, Samson, briefly joined the teaching service and was naturalized as a French subject in 1915 and took up law studies, and by 1928 was appointed as a local magistrate. In the 1940s, he co-founded the Liberal Party along with Prince Norindeth, and was elected to parliament in 1951 and served under various ministry portfolios, notably became the Health and Justice Minister of Cambodia in the 1950s and 1960s.

General Fernandez graduated and commissioned in the French military in 1947, and was assigned in Battambang where he met his wife. In the 1960s Colonel Fernandez served as Secretary of State for National Security.

In 1975, because of the cutting of US aid, the republican government's leaders wanted to stop the war unconditionally. However, Fernandez refused to negotiate with the Khmer Rouge if the government ordered FANK to lay down their arms during the negotiation; for this reason, he resigned as army chief. Fernandez and Lon Nol left the country before the Khmer Rouge took Phnom Penh in 1975. All the republicans wanted to stop the Civil War in Cambodia. Several others officials such as Long Boret, Lon Non and Prince Sisowath Sirik Matak remained in office until the Khmer Rouge captured Phnom Penh on 17 April 1975, thinking that they would be spared through the intercession of Norodom Sihanouk, who had sided with the communists. However, Long, Lon, and Prince Sirik Matak and other Khmer Republic officials were summarily executed by the victorious Khmer Rouge which has been commanded (dictated) by their communist organization of Angkar.

In 1998, General Fernandez returned to Cambodia to meet his former soldiers, and wrote a book about his life as the Commander-in-Chief of the Khmer National Armed Forces. He later left the country to become a roving ambassador.

== Death ==
In 2006, Fernandez died in France, aged 82, due to complications from diabetes.
