= Am Rong =

Cambodian soldier and filmmaker (1929–1975)

Personal details
- Born: 1929 Battambang, Cambodia, French Indochina
- Died: May 1975 (aged 45 – 46) Phnom Penh, Democratic Kampuchea
- Cause of death: Executed by the Khmer Rouge
- Occupation: Spokesman for the Khmer Republic; Soldier; filmmaker

Military service
- Allegiance: First Kingdom of Cambodia; Khmer Republic
- Branch/service: Royal Cambodian Army; Khmer National Army
- Years of service: 1953–1975
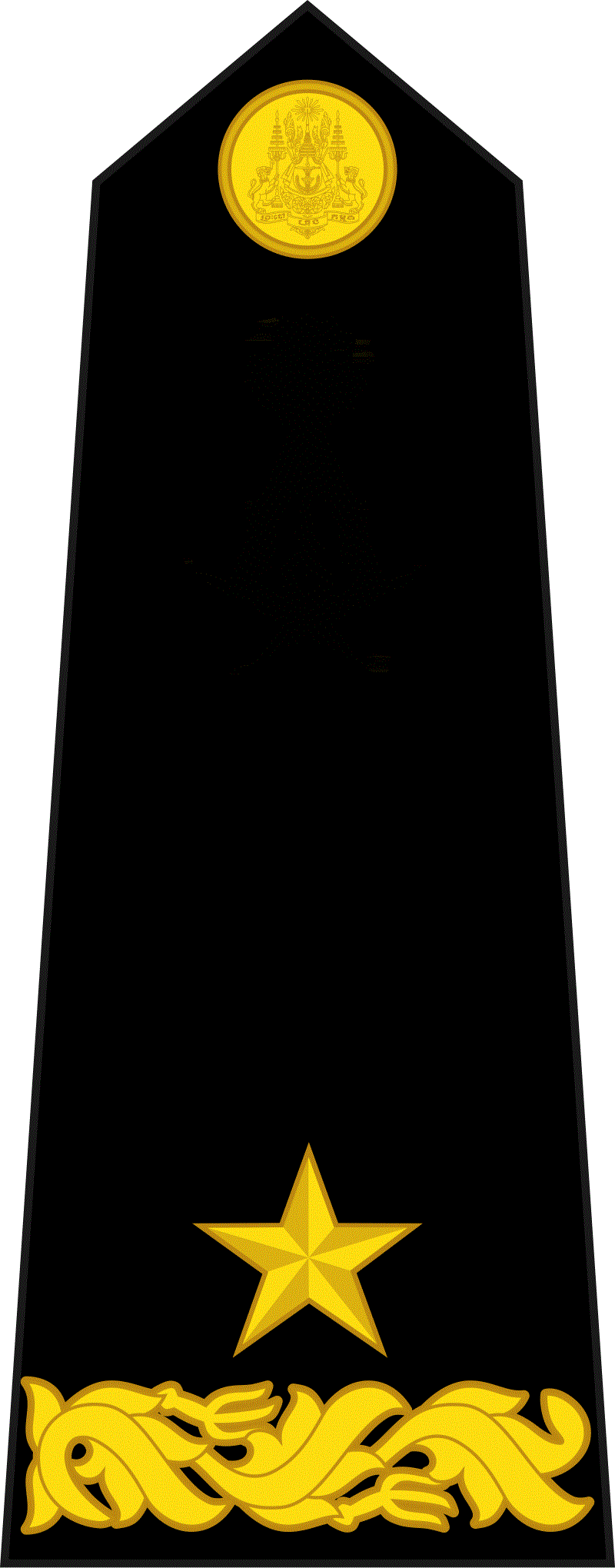
- Rank: Brigadier general
- Commands: Spokesman for the Khmer Republic High Command (1970–1975)
- Battles/wars: Cambodian Civil War

Brigadier general Am Rong (1929 – May 1975) was a Cambodian paratrooper officer and filmmaker, who acted as a spokesman on military matters for the Khmer Republic during the Cambodian Civil War. Western journalists commented on the irony of his name as he gave briefings which "painted a rosy picture of the increasingly desperate situation on the ground" during the war.

== Career ==
Born in 1929 at Battambang, and one of four children from a modest farming family, Am Rong was a graduate of the Royal School of Administration and the Royal Military Academy who joined the Royal Cambodian Army in 1953 and served as a paratrooper officer from 1956. Henry Kamm characterised Rong as "affable and intelligent", who had studied film in France at the IDHEC, the French state film school from 1962 to 1964. Given that Cambodia's then-ruler Prince Norodom Sihanouk had considered himself the premier filmmaker of the country and did not appreciate rivals, Rong found himself being commissioned Major, and the Army "created a film unit consisting of one lonely Major, who had little to do".

In the late 1960s, Lon Nol, then minister of defense, sponsored him on additional military training courses in France and in the United States. In 1970, and still Lon Nol's protégé, he was named spokesman for the Khmer Republic High Command, a post he held until 1975, being entrusted with the job of giving official war briefings to foreign journalists. By the end of the War, he had been promoted to Brigadier general, and a subordinate had been made information minister.

== Death ==
Upon the fall of Phnom Penh on 17 April 1975, Brig. Gen. Am Rong was arrested that same day by the Khmer Rouge, being held and interrogated by them at the Hotel Monorom (11.57°N 104.918°E) in downtown Phnom Penh until sometime in May. It is believed he was executed immediately after these interrogations.

== Films ==
Am Rong completed a number of short documentary films during his career. At least one, The Independence of Cambodia, is held by Rithy Panh's Bophana Audiovisual Center.

== See also ==
- Cambodian Civil War
- Cinema of Cambodia
- Khmer National Armed Forces
- Khmer Republic
- Khmer Rouge
