= Seas (disambiguation) =

Seas include marginal seas, areas of water, various gulfs, bights, bays, and straits.

Seas or SEAS may also refer to:

- Seas, a type of wind wave that develops over time
- SEAS, the ticker symbol for SeaWorld Entertainment at the New York Stock Exchange

== Schools ==
- School of Engineering and Applied Science (disambiguation), the name of several engineering schools at universities in the United States
- School of English and American Studies, an institute at the Eötvös Loránd University

== Science and technology ==
- Shipboard Environmental (data) Acquisition System, a program developed by National Oceanic and Atmospheric Administration to provide accurate meteorological and oceanographic data in real time from ships at sea through the use of satellite data transmission techniques
- Synthetic Environment for Analysis and Simulations

== Other ==
- Special Envoy for Monitoring and Combating anti-Semitism
