= The Sea =

The Sea may refer to:

- The sea, a body of salty water.

== Arts, entertainment, and media ==
=== Films ===
- La Mer (film) (The Sea), an 1895 French short, black-and-white, silent documentary film directed by Louis Lumière
- The Sea (1933 film), a Polish short documentary film directed by Wanda Jakubowska
- The Sea (1962 film), an Italian drama film directed by Giuseppe Patroni Griffi
- The Sea (2000 film), a Spanish drama film directed by Agustí Villaronga
- The Sea (2002 film), an Icelandic comedy-drama film directed by Baltasar Kormákur
- The Sea (2013 film), a British drama film directed by Stephen Brown
- The Sea (2025 film), an Israeli drama film

=== Literature ===
- The Sea (novel), a 2005 Booker Prize-winning novel by John Banville
- The Sea (play), a 1973 play by Edward Bond
- The Sea or The Proverb of the Sea, a poem by the philosopher and poet Khalil Gibran

=== Music ===
==== Groups ====
- The Sea (band), a Cornish rock band

==== Albums ====
- The Sea (Ketil Bjørnstad album), 1995
  - The Sea II, a 1998 album (recorded 1996) by Norwegian pianist Ketil Bjørnstad
- The Sea (Melanie C album), 2011
- The Sea (Corinne Bailey Rae album), 2010
- The Sea, a 1967 album by Rod McKuen

==== Songs ====
- "Beyond the Sea" (song), a song based on "La Mer"
- "The Sea", a song by Morcheeba from their 1998 album Big Calm
- "The Sea", a song by Corinne Bailey Rae from her 2010 album The Sea (Corinne Bailey Rae album)
- "The Sea", a song by Fotheringay from their 1970 album Fotheringay (album)
- "The Sea", a song by Romy from her 2023 album Mid Air (Romy album)
- "The Sea", a song by Sigismund von Neukomm

==== Symphonic music ====
- A Sea Symphony, a piece by Ralph Vaughan Williams
- The Sea (Bridge), an orchestral suite by Frank Bridge
- The Sea, a symphonic poem by Mikalojus Konstantinas Čiurlionis

== Other uses ==
- Sea (astronomy), an area of the sky with many water-related and few land-related constellations
- The Sea, an unconsidered competitor who finished sixth in the 1840 Grand National

== See also ==
- La mer (disambiguation)
- Sea (disambiguation)
- The Sea, the Sea, a novel by Iris Murdoch
