= School of Engineering and Applied Science =

The School of Engineering and Applied Science (SEAS) is the name of several engineering schools at United States universities:

- Fu Foundation SEAS at Columbia University
- Fred DeMatteis SEAS at Hofstra University in New York
- George Washington University SEAS
- Harvard University SEAS
- UCLA Henry Samueli SEAS
- McCormick SEAS at Northwestern University
- University of Pennsylvania SEAS
- University of Virginia SEAS
- Princeton University SEAS
- University at Buffalo SEAS
