= Seah =

Seah may refer to:

- Seah (surname), a surname in various cultures
- Seah (unit), a unit of dry volume of ancient origin used in Jewish law
- Seah Holdings, a South Korean conglomerate

== See also ==
- Seay, a surname
- Shea (disambiguation)
- Siah (disambiguation)
