= Operational Energy Service (France) =

Inter-service branch of the French Army

Badge of the SEA

The Service de l'énergie opérationnelle (SEO), formerly known as Service des essences des armées (SEA), which translates as the Operational Energy Service is an inter-service branch of the French Army subordinate to the head of the defence staff. Recruits are taken both from the French military as a whole and from civilian life. Ranks are based on training.

== History ==
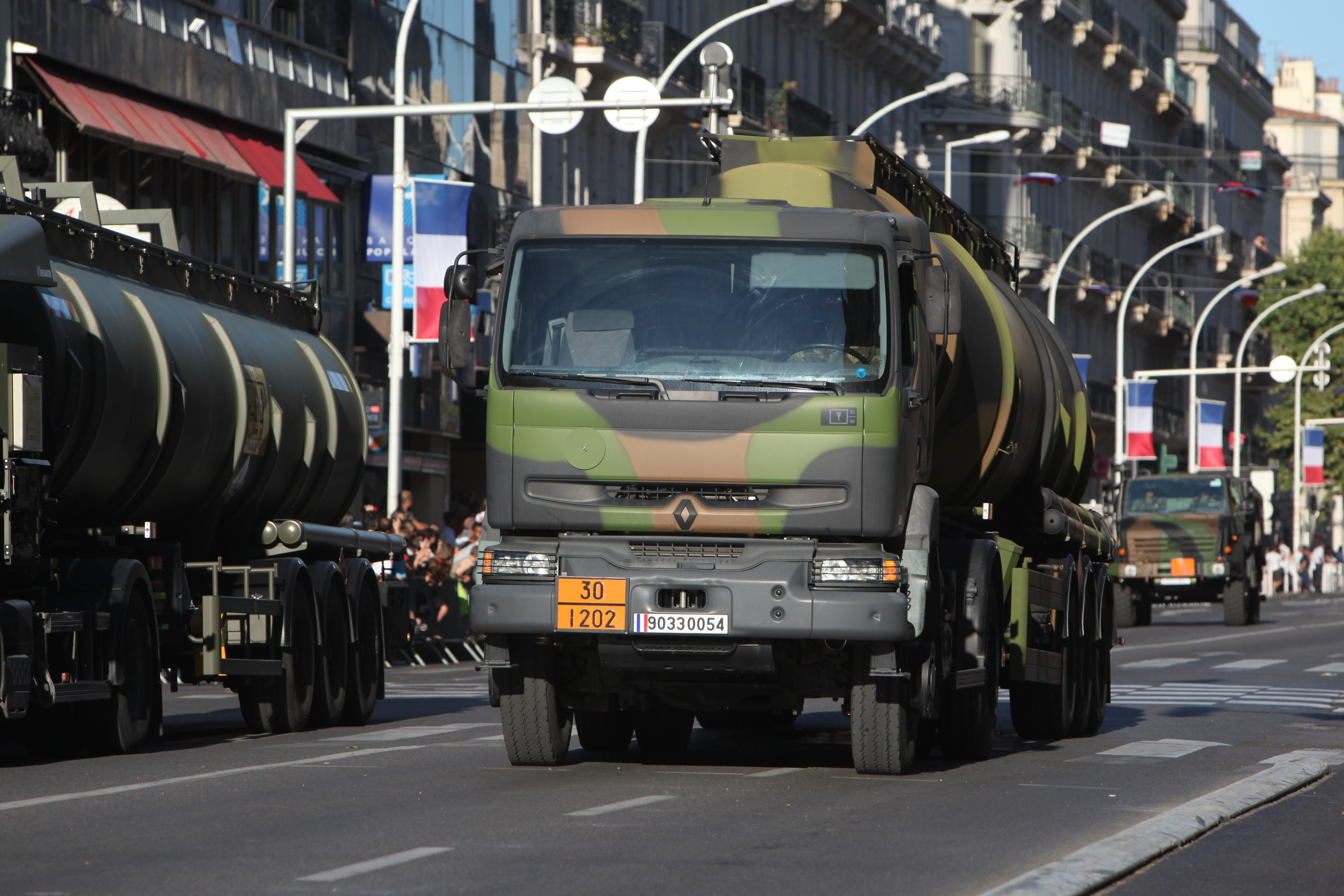
Tanker trucks of the Fuel Service during the Bastille Day parade in Toulon, 2011.

During the First World War, facing the increased use of mechanized warfare, the French armed forces needed to set up a new network for fuel supply. It was then composed of a service to stock and supply the fuel, and a transport service automobile to deliver it to the end users. At the same time, a wider service to provide petrol, oils and lubricants was created. After the war, from July 12 1920 the munitions service resumed the sourcing and stockpiling role, and the artillery the distribution role. Then on November 25 1940 - during the Vichy regime, these functions were combined into one unified service arm: it received the name Military fuel service (SEA), which it still bears.

The order of March 17 1945 defines the SEA as a central service in charge of refueling the whole of the armed forces. A 1991 decree further defined this mission. The service has "to assure at all times, in all places and in all circumstances the fuel support of the armed forces, while also acting as fuel advisor to the General Staff". It therefore supervises the supply of fuels and lubricants for the vehicles of the Army, Navy (outside of naval fuels of hold), Air Force, National Gendarmerie and the National Guard, as well as providing fuel advice.

== Unique Ranks in the SEA ==
The Ingénieurs Militaires des Essences ("Military Fuel Engineers") are engineer officers occupying posts involving scientific fuel research, technical fuel expertise, and administrative control of fuels. They hold the following grades:

- Ingénieur principal (equivalent to a "Commandant" in the French Air Force and Army and "Major" in the United States Armed Forces)
- Ingénieur en chef de deuxième classe (equivalent to a Lieutenant-Colonel)
- Ingénieur en chef de première classe (equivalent to a Colonel)
- Ingénieur général de deuxième classe (equivalent to a Général de brigade).
- Ingénieur général de première classe (equivalent to a Général de division). Director of the SEA.

The officiers of the Corps Technique et Administratif ("Technical and Administrative Corps") occupy supervisory posts and manage the SEA.

The Corps des Agents Techniques (Corps of Technical Agents) provides fuel and lubricant experts, specialists, and advisers to the SEA. Its sous-officers are in three grades:

- Agent Technique ("Technical Agent", equivalent to an Adjudant)
- Agent Technique en Chef ("Chief Technical Agent", equivalent to an Adjudant-Chef)
- Agent Technique Major ("Major Technical Agent", equivalent to a Major)
