= GRUNK =

Government-in-exile of Cambodia (1970–1976)

Royal Government of National Union of Kampuchea រាជរដ្ឋាភិបាលរួបរួមជាតិកម្ពុជា (Khmer) Gouvernement royal d'union nationale du Kampuchéa (French)
- 1970–1976
- Flag Royal arms
- Motto: ជាតិ សាសនា ព្រះមហាក្សត្រ; Chéatĕ, Sasânéa, Preăh Môhaksâtr "Nation, Religion, King"
- Anthem: នគររាជ; Nôkôr Réach "Majestic Kingdom"
- Status: Government-in-exile
- Capital: Phnom Penh
- Capital-in-exile: Beijing; Hong Kong
- Official languages: Khmer
- Recognised national languages: French
- Demonym: Kampuchean
- Government: Monarchy (under a coalition government)
- Monarch
  - 1970–1976: Norodom Sihanouk
- Prime Minister
  - 1970–1976: Penn Nouth
- Vice Prime Minister
  - 1970–1975: Khieu Samphan
- Historical era: Cold War
  - March 1970 coup d'état: 18 March 1970
  - Proclamation of GRUNK: 5 May 1970
  - Capture of Phnom Penh: 17 April 1975
  - Democratic Kampuchea: 5 January 1976
- Currency: Riel (៛) (KHR)
Preceded by	Succeeded by
Kingdom of Cambodia	Democratic Kampuchea
- Today part of: Cambodia; China; Hong Kong

The Royal Government of National Union of Kampuchea (French: Gouvernement royal d'union nationale du Kampuchéa, GRUNK; Khmer: រាជរដ្ឋាភិបាលរួបរួមជាតិកម្ពុជា) was a government-in-exile of Cambodia, based in Beijing and Hong Kong, that was in existence between 1970 and 1976, and was briefly in control of the country starting from 1975.

The GRUNK was based on a coalition (the FUNK, acronym for "National United Front of Kampuchea") between the supporters of exiled Head of State Prince Norodom Sihanouk and the Khmer Rouge ("Red Khmer", an appellation he had himself coined for the members of the Communist Party of Kampuchea). It was formed, with Chinese backing, shortly after Sihanouk had been deposed in the 1970 Cambodian coup d'état; the Khmer Rouge insurgents had until that point been fighting Sihanouk's Sangkum regime.

== Formation ==
In March 1970, Sihanouk was deposed in a coup led by rightist members of his own government: the Prime Minister Lon Nol, his deputy Prince Sisowath Sirik Matak, and In Tam. Sihanouk, who was on a trip abroad, initially called for a large-scale popular uprising against the coup via Beijing Radio on 23 March proclaiming a Government of National Union.

Sihanouk's own version of the Front's formation, published while it was still in existence, is rather different from versions given by later commentators. He stated that he had immediately decided to form a Government of National Union while on the plane between Moscow and Beijing, and that he was pleased to receive a message, dated three days after his subsequent radio broadcast, from the three "leading Khmers Rouges [...] three of our outstanding intellectuals" – Hou Yuon, Hu Nim and Khieu Samphan, all three of whom had been involved with Sihanouk's Sangkum in the 1960s.

In fact, it seems that Sihanouk arrived in Beijing uncertain as to what his next move should be, and it was only after a secret March 21 meeting with premier Pham Van Dong of North Vietnam and Zhou Enlai – the latter being a longstanding supporter of Sihanouk – that he finally decided to ally himself with the Cambodian communists he had been fighting for the past decade; it seems likely that a desire for revenge on Lon Nol, pride, and possible suspicions of an American role in the coup may have precipitated the decision. "I had chosen," Sihanouk commented later, "not to be with the Americans or the communists [...] It was Lon Nol who obliged me to choose between them."

The GRUNK was officially announced on May 5: it was immediately recognised by China.

The formation of the GRUNK under Sihanouk offered the Khmer Rouge leadership a way of obtaining both international recognition and of enlisting the support of the Cambodian peasantry, who were overwhelmingly royalist and conservative, in their fight against Lon Nol's Khmer Republic. Communist forces were rapidly swelled by rural Cambodians, attracted by Sihanouk's name and angry at the casualties caused by American bombing. For Sihanouk, the support of the communists enabled him to continue his bid to regain power and to secure the backing of the North Vietnamese (whose forces occupied swathes of rural Cambodia) and of China. However, it is likely that Sihanouk was conscious that the more hardline elements of the Khmer Rouge would seek his eventual removal; his plan therefore depended on attracting American support for his 'national unity' movement. As the Nixon administration had made a conscious decision to back Lon Nol, this was an unlikely gamble.

== Composition ==
The government was headed by Sihanouk as head of state. The Prime Minister was lawyer and veteran centrist politician Penn Nouth, Sihanouk's political adviser, who had several times served in this capacity both under the French colonial regime and as part of the Sangkum. Khieu Samphan – who remained within the "liberated areas" of Cambodia, allowing the GRUNK to claim not to be a government-in-exile – was deputy premier, minister of defense, and chief of the GRUNK's armed forces. Hou Yuon, a popular and relatively liberal figure amongst the communists, was given several portfolios including that of minister for cooperatives, while Hu Nim was Minister of Information. Nouth, Samphan, Yuon and Nim were all men with a high profile and levels of popularity amongst the Cambodian populace, particularly the latter two, who had often spoken in favour of the rights of the rural peasantry.

Command of the military was however in reality in the hands of Saloth Sar, whose presence in the senior levels of the Khmer Rouge (along with Nuon Chea, Son Sen and Ieng Sary) was kept essentially secret. The Front's military forces on the field, the Cambodian People's National Liberation Armed Forces (CPNLAF) were initially small, and most of the early fighting in the Cambodian Civil War was in fact carried out by North Vietnamese forces with CPNLAF assistance.

Sihanouk's relationship with the Khmer Rouge leadership was always rather strained. While Yuon, Nim, and Samphan had a long experience of being castigated and humiliated by Sihanouk during their years as Sangkum deputies and earlier, Sihanouk had a particular personal dislike for Ieng Sary, who in 1971 was assigned from Hanoi with the express mission of keeping Sihanouk under control. Sihanouk repeatedly (and quite incorrectly) accused him of being a North Vietnamese agent, and forced Sary to sit through risqué films obtained from the French embassy, revelling in his obvious discomfort. Sary, for his part, attempted to spread dissent in the royal entourage, and between Sihanouk and Penn Nouth.

Cabinet of GRUNK
Position	Name	Took office	Left office	Political faction	Notes
Head of State	Norodom Sihanouk	5 May 1970	April 1976	Sihanoukist	In Beijing
Prime Minister	Penn Nouth	5 May 1970	April 1976	Sihanoukist	In Beijing
Assistant Minister	Keat Chhon	1970		Sihanoukist	In Beijing
Vice Prime Minister, Minister of National Defense	Khieu Samphan	5 May 1970		Khmer Rouge	In Cambodia; As Vice Prime Minister since August 1970
Minister of Foreign Affairs	Sarin Chhak	5 May 1970		Sihanoukist	In Beijing
Vice Minister of Foreign Affairs	Pok Deuskomar	August 1970		Khmer Rouge	In Cambodia
Minister of Information	Hu Nim	5 May 1970		Khmer Rouge	In Cambodia
Vice Minister of Information and Propaganda	Tiv Ol	August 1970		Khmer Rouge	In Cambodia
Minister for Cooperatives	Hou Yuon	5 May 1970		Khmer Rouge	In Cambodia
Vice Minister of the Interior and National Security	Sok Thouk	August 1970		Khmer Rouge	In Cambodia
Minister of the Interior	Thiounn Mumm	5 May 1970		Khmer Rouge	In Beijing
Vice Minister of the Economy and Finance	Koy Thuon	August 1970		Khmer Rouge	In Cambodia
Minister for Special Missions	Chau Seng	5 May 1970		Sihanoukist	
Minister of Coordination	Thiounn Prasith	1970		Khmer Rouge	In Beijing
Minister of Public Health, Religion and Social Affairs	Dr. Ngo Hou	5 May 1970	?		
Vice Minister of Public Health, Religion and Social Affairs	Chou Chet	August 1970		Khmer Rouge	In Cambodia
Minister of Popular Education and Youth	Chan Youran	5 May 1970			
Vice Minister of Popular Education and Youth	Ieng Thirith	August 1970		Khmer Rouge	In Cambodia
Minister of Armaments	Duong Sam Ol	5 May 1970		Royal Cambodian Army	Major general
Minister of Justice	Chea San	5 May 1970	?		replaced by Phurissara
Minister of Justice	Samdech Norodom Phurissara	?		Sihanoukist	replaced Chea San
Minister of Public Works and Telecommunications	Huot Sambath	5 May 1970	?		replaced by Touch Phoeun
Minister of Public Works and Telecommunications	Tauch Phoeun	?		Khmer Rouge	replaced Huot Sambath
Minister of Health	Thiounn Thioeunn	?		Khmer Rouge	In Cambodia

== Takeover by Khmer Rouge ==
In the wake of CPNLAF military successes in March 1973, Sihanouk made a visit to the "liberated areas", appearing in photographs with Samphan, Yuon, and Hu Nim (as well as with Saloth Sar, though it is likely Sihanouk was unaware of the latter's seniority). The US initially dismissed the photographs as fakes, pointing out that the three senior cadres – known as the "Three Ghosts", as they had previously disappeared in the late 1960s and were widely presumed to have been murdered by Sihanouk's police – were thought to be dead. Later, a film of the visit was released, which seemed to confirm that the "Three Ghosts" were in fact alive.

Though Sihanouk was deliberately kept at a distance from the peasantry during the visit, the Khmer Rouge leadership seem to have been deeply troubled by the popular adulation with which his appearance was greeted. During 1973, local officials and military commanders with either Sihanoukist or Vietnamese links were quietly removed in the "liberated areas": political indoctrination began to once more criticise Sihanouk as a feudal figure, and by 1974 forces in the hardline South-Western zone (under the command of Ta Mok) began to identify themselves as Khmer Krahom ("Red Khmer") rather than as Khmer Rumdo ("Liberation Khmer"), which had often been used up to that point. Repression and forced collectivisation began to increase in the "liberated areas", particularly in the western part of the country, where the anti-Vietnamese, nationalist elements of the Khmer Rouge were in control: Hou Yuon was to cause considerable difficulties for himself by protesting at the speed with which collectivisation was being carried out. The term "Royal" (Khmer: Reach) was increasingly removed from the GRUNK's proclamations.

In public, Sihanouk had remained optimistic about the nature of the GRUNK regime, stating (for the benefit of Western supporters) that Khieu Samphan "was a socialist with the same basic ideology as the Swedish Prime Minister". However, the American government continued to refuse to deal with him, and in private he had serious concerns about the Khmer Rouge's intentions, stating "the Khmer Rouge will spit me out like a cherry stone" in an interview with an Italian journalist. The Chinese Premier Zhou Enlai warned Étienne Manac'h, the French ambassador, that the Americans' disregard of Sihanouk, and their continued bombing in support of Lon Nol's troops, would result in a far more violent end to the war. Despite these warnings the US continued to ignore Sihanouk, and the Chinese – with some reluctance – gradually began to transfer their direct support to the Khmer Rouge alone.

== After the fall of Phnom Penh ==
By the time of the Khmer Rouge's entry into Phnom Penh on 17 April 1975, the communists were firmly in control of the GRUNK, and communications between GRUNK members inside and outside of Cambodia were effectively cut off. Sihanouk was not even informed of the fall of Phnom Penh; he initially went to Pyongyang until Zhou Enlai persuaded him to return as Cambodian Head of State, despite severe misgivings on Sihanouk's part.

Sihanouk was given a ceremonial reception in Phnom Penh, but was deeply shocked by what he observed in the city. The death of his protector Zhou Enlai in January 1976 weakened Sihanouk's position further: after hearing of Khmer Rouge human rights abuses via foreign radio, he resigned in April 1976. According to his own account, the Khmer Rouge leadership initially dispatched Sary to attempt to persuade him to stay, but Sihanouk insisted on resigning, and was subsequently kept under effective house arrest; Khieu Samphan became Head of State. Penn Nouth was similarly removed; the first plenary meeting of the Representative Assembly of Democratic Kampuchea, held on April 11–13, 1976, confirmed a previously largely unknown "rubber plantation worker" named Pol Pot as Prime Minister. Pol Pot was later revealed to be the former radio technology student and Khmer Rouge cadre Saloth Sâr.

Most of the remaining Sihanoukists in the GRUNK were soon to be executed, such as Sihanouk's leftist cousin Prince Norodom Phurissara, who is thought to have been tortured and killed at a 're-education' centre in 1976, and Chea San, former GRUNK Minister of Justice, who was killed at Tuol Sleng; only Penn Nouth avoided a similar fate. Of the prominent Khmer Rouge members of the GRUNK, Hou Yuon had disappeared by 1975 and by 1976 was almost certainly dead. Communist intellectuals Hu Nim and Chau Seng were to be 'purged' and executed at Tuol Sleng in 1977; Khieu Samphan continued as Khmer Rouge Head of State, perhaps protected by his reputation for unswerving loyalty to Pol Pot, though his role was largely symbolic.

== Events after the fall of Democratic Kampuchea ==
After the Vietnamese invasion of 1978, the defeat of the Khmer Rouge and the subsequent establishment of the People's Republic of Kampuchea, Sihanouk was asked by the Khmer Rouge leadership to present the case of Democratic Kampuchea at the United Nations. Sihanouk publicly broke with the Khmer Rouge, demanding that they be expelled from the UN as mass murderers. The Khmer Rouge attempt at establishing a new front organization – Patriotic and Democratic Front of the Great National Union of Kampuchea – to re-legitimize their thoroughly discredited 'Democratic Kampuchea' regime met with little success at first.

By June 1982, however, Sihanouk and his FUNCINPEC organisation had re-entered into an uneasy association with the Khmer Rouge in the Coalition Government of Democratic Kampuchea, which still occupied the Cambodian seat at the United Nations. The third partner in the coalition was the 'third force' of Son Sann's Khmer People's National Liberation Front.

== See also ==
- Cambodian Civil War
- Khmer Republic
- Khmer Rouge
- Khmer National Armed Forces
- Sihanoukist National Army
- Vietnamese invasion of Cambodia
