= National United Front of Kampuchea =

Cambodian organization (1970–1975)

- រណសិរ្សរួបរួមជាតិកម្ពុជា
- Flag of Cambodia. Other flags were used, for example, the Khmer Rouge used their own flag. It consisted of a yellow Angkor Wat on a red background
- Founding leader: Norodom Sihanouk (Khmer Rumdo/GRUNK); Pol Pot (Khmer Rouge)
- Founded: 18 March 1970
- Dates active: 1970–1975
- Dissolved: 17 April 1975
- Merger of: Khmer Rumdo; Khmer Rouge
- Country: State of Cambodia (March – October 1970); Khmer Republic (until 1975) Kampuchea (from 1975; until 1976)
- Allegiance: Prince Sihanouk; GRUNK (1970–1975) Kampuchea (1975–1976)
- Headquarters: Beijing, China (1970–1975); Phnom Penh, Cambodia (1975–1976)
- Newspaper: Tung Padevat (1975–1976)
- Ideology: Monarchism; Sihanoukism; Khmer nationalism Anti-Imperialism

The National United Front of Kampuchea (French: Front uni national du Kampuchéa or Front uni national khmer, FUNK; Khmer: រណសិរ្សរួបរួមជាតិកម្ពុជា, Rônâsĕrs Ruŏbruŏm Chéatĕ Kâmpŭchéa) was an organisation formed by the deposed then Chief of State of Cambodia, Norodom Sihanouk, in 1970 while he was in exile in Beijing.

== History ==
The front was supposed to be an umbrella organization of forces that opposed Lon Nol's seizure of power; however, the Communist Party of Kampuchea/Khmer Rouge guerrillas formed the basic military force of the Front. Apart from the communists, there were two distinct factions that participated in the insurgency: the pro-Sihanouk royalists (Khmer Rumdos), who never held real power in the front, and secondly, the pro-North Vietnamese cadres of Khmer Issarak.

The territories controlled by the guerrillas were nominally led by a Royal United National Government of Kampuchea (GRUNK). The government was based in Beijing. Sihanouk remained the head of state in that government, Penn Nouth was the prime minister and Khieu Samphan the deputy prime minister, minister of defense and commander-in-chief of the GRUNK forces. The possibility to exploit peasant masses' traditional adherence to Cambodia's monarchs greatly helped the Khmer Rouge to recruit members to the front. China, the USSR and North Vietnam backed the 'Royal Government', whereas North Vietnamese retained a more pro-Sihanouk stance as the Khmer Rouge began to consolidate their positions in 1971. The deposed king remained a figurehead of the front and nominal head of state until Khmer Rouge victory over Lon Nol in 1975.

== FUNK Central Committee ==
On 5 May 1970, the politburo members of the FUNK Central Committee were:

- Chairman: Penn Nouth
- Politburo members:
  - Chau Seng (Khmer Rouge)
  - Hu Nim (Khmer Rouge)
  - Major Gen. Duong Sam Ol (Royal Cambodian Army)
  - Huot Sambath
  - Chan Youran
  - Khieu Samphan (Khmer Rouge)
  - Chea San
  - Sarin Chhak
  - Hou Yuon (Khmer Rouge)
  - Thiounn Mumm

== See also ==
- Cambodian Civil War
- Viet Minh
- Khmer Rouge
- Coalition Government of Democratic Kampuchea
- Kampuchean United Front for National Salvation
- Patriotic and Democratic Front of the Great National Union of Kampuchea

== Bibliography ==
- Milton Osborne, Sihanouk, Prince of Light, Prince of Darkness. Silkworm 1994
