= Thiounn Mumm =

Cambodian scientist and Minister of the Democratic Kampuchea (1925–2022)

Thiounn Mumm (Khmer: ជួន មុំ, 8 December 1925 – 22 March 2022) was a Khmer civil servant, who served as Minister under the Khmer Rouge. He was also the first Cambodian to attend the Ecole Polytechnique. While some considered him a "racist political dynast" and condemned him for his collaboration with the atrocious regime of the Democratic Kampuchea, he defended himself from adhering to the ideologies of communism and presented himself merely as a Khmer nationalist.

== Biography ==
=== From youth at the Palace to exile in France ===
Thiounn Mumm was born in Phnom Penh on 8 December 1925 as the third child of Thiounn Hal and Bounchan Moly in the wealthy bureaucratic family of Thiounn, his grandfather, who had been Minister of the Palace since 1904. His father Thiounn Hal was the first Cambodian to obtain lycee and university qualification in France. His mother Bunnchan Moly, was the sister of Lon Nol's future Minister of Cults, Bunchan Mol, the author of Kuk noyobay. His two older brothers Prasith and Thioeunn would also join the Khmer Rouge while little is known of his younger brother Thioum. After the death of their grandfather, three of the brothers with three other Cambodian students travelled to France with King Norodom Sihanouk in 1946 and remained there to pursue their studies. Mumm was admitted to the Classe préparatoire aux grandes écoles of Lycee Louis-le-Grand where he studied mathematics for two years.

=== From Polytechnicien to revolutionary ===
In 1948, Mumm successfully passed the contest to enter the Ecole Polytechnique and was the first Cambodian ever to do so, before specializing in telecommunications at the École nationale supérieure des télécommunications in Paris in 1952. In 1954, he married Monique Michele, with whom he had two children.

Mumm was a central figure within the small circle of Cambodians in France, setting up the Khmer students' association (Association des Etudiants Khmers) at the Indochina House of the Cité Universitaire in Paris, until the association was dissolved in 1952 and the unofficial meetings continued at Mumm's private house in Sceaux. "Part mentor, part older brother, part bully and part leader", among his protégés was the young Pol Pot, whom he introduced to the French Communist Party in 1952. Momm would become one of the most important ideologues of the [Khmer Communist] party.

Among Khmer Communists, however, Thiounn Mumm seems to have best understood Marxism; he coldly analyzed Cambodian society and wanted to raise the educational level of the people.

— Marie-Alexandre Martin, Cambodia: a shattered society

In 1954 following the independence of Cambodia, Thiounn returned to Cambodia and failed to be elected as a radical democrat candidate with the Pracheachon party in the 1955 general election along with Keng Vannsak, which decided him to return to France in April 1955, where he started working in 1956 as an engineer for the French national centre for Scientific research (CNRS) in the physics-mathematics section. He published various research papers on nuclear physics and mathematics, particularly the singular solutions of Dirac equations and the theory of the De Broglie double solution. He also collaborated on research projects with French physicist Georges Lochak.

In 1957, Thiounn Mom hosted Prince Norodom Sihanouk during the celebration of the 2500th anniversary of the birth of the Buddha for the inauguration of the Maison du Cambodge at the Cité Internationale in Paris.

=== From assistant of Prince Sihanouk to minister of the Khmer rouge ===
Mumm worked in France as an engineer until Lon Nol's coup d'état in 1970. At Prince Sihanouk's request, Thiounn joined him in Beijing in April 1970 and he worked to coordinate the anti-American coalition until the fall of Phnom Penh in 1975, with other cadres such as his brother Thiounn Prasith and Keat Chhon. Thiounn Mumm, as “ Finance Minister ” of Sihanouk, spent a week in the Soviet Union from June 26 to July 3, 1970, and had talks with the Deputy Foreign Minister, Nikolay Firyubin, probably hoping to persuade the Russians to recognise Sihanouk's government. As international representative, Mumm used the prestige of his name and his scientific talent, and one can understand that for the Democratic Kampuchea he was a "national living patrimony".

At a communist congress in Beijing in 1971, Huot Sambath, Brigadier General Hu Nim, Sarin Chhak, Chea San, Thiounn Mumm, and Hak Seang Layny were chosen at the Cambodian leaders to coordinate the "national liberation struggle". While in China, Mumm was alone responsible for drafting the political programme of the National United Front of Kampuchea which Sihanouk had set up. In September 1975, Sihanouk and Thiounn travelled on the same plane to Cambodia.

From the beginning, Thiounn Mumm had been critical of the anti-intellectual violence among the Khmer Rouge, criticizing the auto-da-fé at the Cathedral of Phnom Penh or at the French School of the Far East, and this criticism may have resulted in a certain distrust of Pol Pot, despite years of comradery since Paris. Mumm was recruited by Vorn Vet at the Ministry of Industry through the recommendation of Ieng Sary that Mumm knew since his time in Paris. where he directed a chemistry lab. At the Fourth Party Congress in Phnom Penh in September 1978, Pol Pot unveiled a plan for a revolutionary technical education system, sharing the stage with Mumm, who was in charge of putting an "intellectual gloss" to the program. From September 1978, on Vom Vet's orders, Mumm became directed the then Soviet Institute in Phnom Penh, to reeducate the youth of Cambodia and train a new generation of cadres in an attempt of the Angkar to display a "human face". Thiounn Mumm was the president of Phnom Penh Academy of Sciences and Technology before the Vietnamese occupation of the capital.

On January 7, 1979, a few hours before the arrival of the Vietnamese troops, he was warned to leave the city, which he complied with, and went to the Cardamom Mountains. He sought asylum at a refugee camp in Thailand until the danger of being killed by Vietnamese hired guns was too great. After travelling undercover for ten months in the provinces of Cambodia under Vietnamese control, Thiounn reached the areas still under the control of the Khmer Rouge and joined the government of the Democratic Kampuchea of Khieu Samphan that he served as head of the science and technology commission. He represented the new Democratic Kampuchea government and held the rank of minister, leading him to head the Cambodian delegation at both ICMAS and UNESCO. In 1980, Thiounn Mumm led a delegation of the Democratic Kampuchea to Spain. In late 1982, when the Coalition Government of Democratic Kampuchea was formed between the Khmer Rouge, Sihanouk and Sun Sen, Thiounn returned to France on his diplomatic visa, left the party, and was reunited with his family.

== Contribution ==
=== A Khmer rouge intellectual who refused to be called a Communist ===
Thiounn Mumm, though he confessed his interest for communism, denies ever join a Communist party or adhering to the ideology. He was appalled by the economic program of Pol Pot. Though his support for the Khmer rouge may have been more "khmer" than "rouge", the political program he penned was clearly a socialist centralized program. Questioned by Henri Locard, Thiounn Mumm compared the revolutionary "Khmer Rouge" project to peasant revolts of Christian Anabaptist inspiration in Europe in the 16th century.

=== The myth of Angkor in nationalist propaganda ===
The nationalism of Thiounn was epitomized by the myth of Angkor which became an essential component of Khmer Rouge utopia. Henri Locard; however remarks how dubious this comparison was:

Angkorian civilization conceived of power as a mission of service to the people and established the primacy of the general interest over that of the individual. The happiness and well-being of the people was the end of all power!

— Thiounn Mumm, Political program, 1975

Beyond this propaganda, Thiounn Mumm may have had a true concern for the heritage of Angkor Wat, despite destructions and vandalism taking place during the Khmer Rouge regime. On May 20, 1982, Thiounn Mumm, as minister of culture and education and concurrently minister in charge of the State scientific and Technological commission of the Democratic Kampuchea, was the first to point out the threat to the historic site of Angkor that the Vietnamese occupation of Cambodia entailed.

== Posterity ==
Thiounn Mumm died in Paris on 22 March 2022, at the age of 96. His son, Nicolas Thiounn, is a professor of Urology at the European Hospital Georges-Pompidou in Paris.

== Bibliography ==
- Toth Putry, Lok Brịddhācāry Paṇḍit Juon Mumm [Le vénérable docteur Thiounn Mumm], Phnom Penh, Éditions Angkor, 2019, 199 p.
