= Khmer Rumdo =

Guerrilla fighter group during the Cambodian Civil War

Khmer Rumdos
- ខែ្មររំដោះ
- Flag of Cambodia, generally associated with the Khmer Rumdo guerilla forces
- Dates active: 1970 - 1975
- Dissolved: 17 April 1975
- Merged into: National United Front of Kampuchea (1970 - 1975)
- Country: Cambodia
- Allegiance: National United Front of Kampuchea (1970 - 1975)
- Headquarters: Beijing, China
- Ideology: Monarchism
- Part of: National United Front of Kampuchea (FUNK)

The Khmer Rumdos (Khmer: ខ្មែររំដោះ) were one of several groups of guerrillas operating within the borders of Cambodia during the Cambodian Civil War of 1970–1975. Alternatively, it is spelt Khmer Rum or Khmer Rumdoh ("Liberation Khmer" in the Khmer language). They were a part of the National United Front of Kampuchea (Front Uni National du Kampuchea, FUNK), an association between Prince Norodom Sihanouk, who had been ousted from power in 1970, and the communist Khmer Rouge.

== Origin and history ==
Although the boundaries between the different factions were somewhat confused, the Khmer Rumdo are generally identified as those elements which were nominally loyal to Prince Sihanouk, but which were also leftist and supported by North Vietnam.

The faction had its origins partly in the history of the Communist Party of Kampuchea and of the early Khmer Issarak (independence) movement. Many of the early Cambodian communists had strong links with the Viet Minh, received training and support from the Communist Party of Vietnam, and in many cases supported Sihanouk as a figure of national unity. These cadres retained senior positions in many of the areas east of the Mekong and near the Vietnamese border. The 'Khmer Rumdo' forces, accordingly, were recruited largely in the east of the country.

They were differentiated from the forces loyal to the hardline 'Centre' of the Communist Party of Kampuchea, who were strongest in the west and south-west, and who were generally referred to by European and American observers as the Khmer Rouge (a name originally coined by Sihanouk to refer to Cambodian communists in general). The 'Centre', led by Saloth Sar, Son Sen and Ieng Sary, had a strongly nationalistic ideology, and did not cooperate so much with North Vietnam, receiving most of its support from China; it also disliked Sihanouk, regarding him as a 'feudal' figure. There were even periodic reports of clashes between the 'Centre' troops on the one side, and the eastern forces (and their Vietnam People's Army support) on the other – although both factions coordinated their efforts against the Khmer National Armed Forces (FANK), the armed forces of Lon Nol's Khmer Republic.

During the early part of the Civil War, the Khmer Rumdo were estimated to be by far the stronger element of the Cambodian forces opposing Lon Nol. In August 1971, the Khmer Republic official In Tam estimated the non-Vietnamese insurgents to number around 10,000: of these, he was forced to admit that only 4000 were true 'Khmer Rouge', the remainder being made up of Sihanoukists and Khmers fighting what they regarded as an "American occupation".

After Sihanouk's 1973 visit to the 'liberated areas', however, where he was greeted with vocal support from the peasants, the 'Centre' began to quietly remove both the Sihanoukists and pro-Vietnamese cadres from the administration in the areas they controlled. By 1974, it was reported that the forces loyal to the 'Centre' were using the term Khmer Krahom – i.e. Red Khmer or Khmer Rouge – to identify themselves, rather than 'Khmer Rumdo'.

As time went by there were reports that Khmer Rumdo were, in some cases, directly involved in activities against the Khmer Rouge administration within the 'liberated areas'. There were at least three incidents in Region 35 (Kampot Province) in late 1973 in which Khmer Rumdo forces took part in action against hardline Communist Party troops, and rallied peasants protesting against attempts by Party cadres to requisition rice crops. By early 1974, a large pro-Sihanouk force was reported to be attempting to gain military control of main roads in the province. In Region 37 in the Western Zone, 742 Khmer Rumdo surrendered en masse to the Lon Nol regime in March 1974, claiming they were part of a force of ten thousand who would follow if Nol gave them operational autonomy to carry on their fight against their Communist Party rivals.

== The administration in eastern Cambodia, 1970–75 ==
Accounts obtained from refugees stated that not only did the eastern forces, under the command of Chan Chakrey, dress differently to the Khmer Rouge (wearing green military fatigues rather than the black peasants' clothing adopted by Khmer Rouge soldiers) but that in their zones of control they behaved with considerably more moderation (captured FANK officers, for example, were merely ordered to perform labour, rather than being executed as was invariably the case with the Khmer Rouge). There is also evidence that there was a greater degree of religious and economic freedom permitted in the eastern areas, even after the fall of the Lon Nol regime in 1975.

== Purges after 1975 ==
The senior Khmer Rouge leaders who had publicly collaborated with Sihanouk, either prior to 1970 or in the 'Unified Front', were either killed (as in the case of Hou Yuon and Hu Nim) – or marginalised (as in the case of Khieu Samphan) – after the establishment of Democratic Kampuchea.

The Eastern Zone was purged by the Party Centre in 1976–77. Chakrey was executed in Tuol Sleng Detention Centre in 1976, the first high-ranking official to be sent there; while So Phim, the Eastern Zone Secretary, committed suicide. Some of the ousted Eastern Zone cadres – such as Heng Samrin – would later go on to lead the People's Republic of Kampuchea after the 1979 Vietnamese invasion.

== See also ==
- National United Front of Kampuchea
