= Thiounn Prasith =

Cambodian politician and diplomat (1930–2023)

Thiounn Prasith ជួន ប្រសិទ្ធិ

Permanent Representative of Cambodia to the United Nations
- In office 1979–1991

Deputy Permanent Representative of Cambodia to the United Nations
- In office 1991–1993

Personal details
- Born: 3 February 1930 Phnom Penh, Cambodia
- Died: 2 June 2023 (aged 93) Le Kremlin-Bicêtre, Paris, France
- Party: Communist Party of Kampuchea
- Spouse: Christine Gouret
- Children: 2 daughters, 1 son
- Parents: Thiounn Hal (father); Bunchan Moly (mother)

Thiounn Prasith (Khmer: ជួន ប្រសិទ្ធិ; 3 February 1930 – 2 June 2023) was a Cambodian politician and diplomat who worked for the Khmer Rouge regime.

Born in Phnom Penh, he had two famous elder brothers: Thiounn Thioeunn, Minister of Health; and Thiounn Mumm, Ministry of Industry. He was also a grandson of Thiounn. In September 1949, Thiounn Prasith went to study in France. He joined Cercle Marxiste ("Marxist Circle"), a Marxist–Leninist organisation which was created by Pol Pot and other two comrades. In late December 1955, he returned to Cambodia, and was appointed deputy manager of "operations" of the royal railways. In June 1963 he left for France for health reasons. After the 1970 coup, Thiounn Prasith joined GRUNK in Beijing. He was appointed the Minister of Coordination by Norodom Sihanouk.

During the Khmer Rouge's regime, Thiounn Prasith worked as an interpreter in Ministry of Foreign Affairs. He was also a close adviser to Ieng Sary. After the Pol Pot regime fell in the course of the Vietnamese invasion of 1979, he went to the United Nations in New York together with Sihanouk and Keat Chhon. From 1979 to 1991 was appointed the permanent UN ambassador. He defended the Khmer Rouge before the United Nations. Later, he was appointed the deputy ambassador. He retired in 1993. After retirement, he was reported to be living in the New York suburb of Mount Vernon. As a former Khmer Rouge officer, he was not welcomed in the United States. In 1995, State Department vowed to deport him. Later, he moved to France in 2001. On 8 June 2009, he was interviewed in Paris. He died in Le Kremlin-Bicêtre, Paris on 2 June 2023, at the age of 93.
