= So Nem =

Cambodian politician

So Nem is the former minister for national education of Cambodia. He was the joint founder with Chau Sengof of La Nouvelle Dèpêche (The New Dispatch) newspaper in the 1960s. He was a member of the national assembly.

== See also ==
- Bun Chanmol
