= Bunchan Mol =

Cambodian author and political activist

- ប៊ុណ្ណចន្ទ ម៉ុល
- Born: 1921; French Indochina
- Died: 1975 (aged 53–54); Khmer Republic
- Occupations: Political activist, writer
- Notable work: Political Prison (1972); Charet Khmer (1973)

Bunchan Mol (Khmer: ប៊ុណ្ណចន្ទ ម៉ុល) was a Cambodian political activist and writer who was executed by the Khmer Rouge after the fall of Phnom Penh. According to political scientist Sorpong Peou, his best-selling political pamphlet, Charet Khmer (Khmer: ចរិតខ្មែរ, 'The Khmer character'), is "perhaps the most widely read book among Cambodians".

== Biography ==
=== The youngest prisoner after the Umbrella Demonstration ===
Bunchan Mol was born in Cambodia in 1921 close to the Royal Palace as the fourth son of the district governor of Ta Khmau. In 1934, at age 13, he was sent by his family to join the Buddhist monkhood at Wat Langka under the modernist abbot Lvea Em.

In 1940, he left the monkhood to start Khmer boxing and became one of the top fighters. After taking part in the Umbrella Demonstration led by Son Ngoc Thanh against the French protectorate in Phnom Penh in 1942, he was the youngest prisoner at age 22 sent along with all monks such as Hem Chieu and other political activists to Con Son Prison, which housed thousands of convicts from Cambodia, Laos and Vietnam. There he became famous by being victorious in kickboxing tournaments organized by the prison wards. They were liberated by the Japanese forces in January 1945, after Hem Chieu died from dysentery.

=== Cofounder of the Khmer Issarak ===
As Mol returned to Cambodia, his nationalist spirit was unaltered; indeed, it was inflamed. He started publishing the Nokor Wat newspaper again. After the Japanese capitulation in 1945, he co-founded the Khmer Issarak, an anti-French and anti-colonial movement. However, after this, the French troops arrested Son Ngoc Thanh, on 16 October 1945, and Mol feared for his life. Therefore, he fled to live with an uncle in the Pok family and was married to a girl from the House of Abhaiwongse in Battambang which was part of the strategy of marital alliances of this old Thai dynasty to keep control over the Northwest of Cambodia. At the same time, as a disciple of non-violence, he rejected the guerilla methods of the Khmer Issarak and quickly parted with their politburo.

In 1951, he became a member of former Prime Minister Ieu Koeus's Democratic Party. At that time, Bunchan Mol reconnected with the descendants of Thiounn, who had also been removed from the inner circle of the Royal Palace by King Sihanouk. His younger sister, Bunchan Moly, was married to Thiounn Hol, whose father was Thiounn Mumm, and who was associated with others important Khmer Rouge cadres. Disgruntled by this opposition, King Norodom Sihanouk dissolved the parliament in 1953. After a meeting with Sihanouk, despite having the King's assurance that they would be safe, Bunchan Mol and other members of the Democratic Party were brutalized, stones were thrown at them resulting in bruises and injuries.

=== Writer and propagandist of nationalist ideology until the last day of the Khmer Republic ===
In September 1970, along with So Nem, former minister of national education in Cambodia, Mol led a delegation of Cambodian Buddhists delegates to a meeting in Korea. There, he redacted an appeal made by the Buddhist association of Cambodia concerning the aggression committed by Vietcong North Vietnamese forces against Cambodia which was maintaining a neutral policy until the coup d'état of 1970. In the new Khmer Republic, Mol worked under Lon Nol as an undersecretary of propaganda and religion.

In 1972, he published his autobiography, Kuk Noyobay (Khmer: គុកនយោបាយ, 'Political Prison') which was an immediate bestseller. Three months after the book first came out, a new edition was already in print. In 1973, he published another book which was a political essay about the moral decay and necessary renewal of the Khmer character.

As many influential intellectuals in his generation, he was among the first people executed in April 1975 when the Khmers Rouges entered Phnom Penh and imposed the regime of terror and plunder.

== Legacy: defining the Khmer character ==
A Khmer does not want any others other than himself to become more popular and cannot trust anyone else enough to let the latter soar higher than himself. He must be the supreme leader who stands over and above everyone else.

— Bunchan Mol, The Khmer Character

Bunchan Mol's 1972 autobiography entitled Political Prison has become a classic of the canonical literature of post-war Cambodia. His bestseller was followed by another book about The Khmer Character. He wanted to rekindle the spirit of "Khmer Builders of Angkor" and "Khmer Breed of Angkor Warriors" for the future of Cambodia With lasting peace and prosperity for all Cambodians. He was particularly critical of figures such as the blood-thirsty governor of Siem Reap, Dap Chhuon. However, some have seen his criticism as damning judgement on Khmer character: "Bun Chanmol reflects on the deep-seated mistrust that had marked leadership throughout Khmer history." He laments on the "bestial nature and divisions of the Khmer Issarak liberation movement." Thus, some have concluded that there is nothing specific about the Khmer character in his book and that it only expresses his own resentment. His Khmer nationalism was also tainted with a strong anti-Vietnamese sentiment. In fact, he considered that "Yuon [Vietnamese] supported Sihanouk in order to conquer the remaining Cambodian territory and destroy the Khmer race". His role in the nationalist movement was praised by the Khmer historian Bun Than in his 1995 book Pravoat Neak Tasou Khmer (The History of Khmer Heroes). Thereafter, his analysis of the corruption of the Khmer character during the Cambodian Civil War and the necessity to return to the heroic character of past heroes of Cambodia inspired Hun Sen who recommended that the book be printed and read again in 1995 and it continues to inspire younger Khmer generations in the third millennium.

== Bibliography ==
- Mol, Bunchan; Taing, Rinith (2021). "From Political Prison". Manoa. 34 (1): 205–211. doi:10.1353/man.2021.0061. S2CID 250437699.
