= Chau Seng =

Cambodian politician

- ចៅ សេង
- Born: March 15, 1929; Tri Tôn, Châu Đốc Province, Cochinchina, French Indochina
- Died: 1977 (aged 47–48); Democratic Kampuchea
- Occupation: Politician
- Organization: Sangkum

Chau Seng (Khmer: ចៅ សេង, 15 March 1929 – 1977) was a Cambodian left-wing politician.

Seng was a Khmer Krom. Born in the commune of Tri Tôn, Châu Đốc Province, Cochinchina (in present-day An Giang Province, Vietnam), he was a cousin of Chau Sen Cocsal Chhum. Educated in France, in Paris, he became a communist. On his return to Cambodia, he became Norodom Sihanouk's private secretary. He joined the Sangkum on 13 April 1957 together with Hou Yuon and Hu Nim. In the same year, Chau Seng was elected a member of National Assembly. After that he was appointed under-secretary, and later secretary of state for education. In 1967, he was the rector of the Buddhist University. Seng made a national attempt at Cambodianization, however it failed.

After the Cambodian coup of 1970 in which Sihanouk was ousted by Lon Nol, Chau Seng served as the Minister for Special Missions of the GRUNK government, the Beijing-based government-in-exile that was formed as a coalition between Sihanouk and the communists.

Seng was arrested, tortured and later executed by the Khmer Rouge at S-21 prison in 1977.
