= Hu Nim =

Cambodian politician (1932–1977)

- Hu Nim, wearing the krama, as a member of the GRUNK

Personal details
- Born: 25 July 1932 Kampong Cham, Cambodia, French Indochina
- Died: 6 July 1977 (aged 44) Tuol Sleng, Phnom Penh, Democratic Kampuchea
- Cause of death: Torture murder
- Party: Communist Party of Kampuchea (CPK) (1970 - 1977)
- Other political affiliations: GRUNK (1970 - 1976); Sangkum (c.1960s - 1970)
- Spouse: Kim Lang/Comrade Yeat (m. 1952)
- Education: Royal University of Phnom Penh

Hu Nim (Khmer: ហូ នឹម, 25 July 1930 or 1932 – 6 July 1977), alias "Phoas" (ភាស់), was a Cambodian Communist intellectual and politician who held a number of ministerial posts. His long political career included spells with the Sangkum regime of Prince Norodom Sihanouk, the Communist guerrilla resistance, the GRUNK coalition government-in-exile, and the administration of Democratic Kampuchea, when the country was controlled by the Communist Party of Kampuchea (the Khmer Rouge).

Nim had a reputation as one of the most independent-minded and outspoken members of the Khmer Rouge, and was eventually arrested, tortured and executed at Tuol Sleng security prison in 1977 during a party purge.

== Early life ==
Hu Nim was born in 1932 (25 July 1932 according to some sources) in the village of Korkor, Kampong Siem District, Kampong Cham Province to a Sino-Khmer family. Unlike many of his later colleagues in the Party intelligentsia, he came from a poor background. In his 'confession' I would like to report to the Party about my history, extracted under torture at Tuol Sleng, Nim was to relate that "my father, Hou, died in 1936 when I was just six years old. I then lived in the care of my mother, named Sorn, a poor peasant. She earned her living by offering household services to people". His mother, who remarried a landless peasant farmer, eventually sent him to live with Sam Khor at a pagoda in Mien, Prey Chhor District.

Brought up by Sam Khor, Nim was given the chance to study at Kampong Cham junior school, going on to the Lycee Sisowath in the capital, Phnom Penh. Here, he stayed at the Unnalom Monastery, with his studies being funded by the family of his future wife, Kim Lang, later known as Comrade Yeat. In the early 1950s, Nim - in common with many other later Communists - became associated with the left-leaning, pro-independence Democratic Party. As his confession stated, he was a part of the party's radical People's Movement wing, the Pracheachollana, led by Um Sim and associated with the republican nationalist Son Ngoc Thanh.

Nim married in 1952, and subsequent to finishing his studies worked briefly as a teacher. After further studies in Law and Economics he moved into government work, and secured a full-time post at the Ministry of the Interior. He continued his work for the Democratic Party up to the 1955 elections, which handed power to Prince Norodom Sihanouk's Sangkum movement amidst an atmosphere of extreme political intimidation and possible vote-rigging.

== Studies in France ==
The Democratic Party's policies had offered talented Cambodians the chance to study in France on a government scholarship; several future Communists, including Saloth Sar (Pol Pot), Khieu Samphan, Ieng Sary and Hou Yuon, had studied abroad under this system, falling under the influence of the French Communist Party in the process. Hu Nim was to take this route in 1955: intending to become a customs officer, he studied at the Customs School and law school in Paris, travelling several hours every day by Metro to get to his place of study. Amongst the expatriate community, he met Hou Yuon and several other future colleagues, although stating in his 'confession' that "political activities were not carried out because my studies required so much attention".

Nim returned to Cambodia in 1957 to work as a customs official, but from this point his political involvement was to increase substantially. Whether or not he had taken part in political activity in France, his position was to move steadily to the left following the winding-up of the Democratic Party during the same year.

== Under the Sangkum 1958-67 ==
Sihanouk, having effectively destroyed the ability of the Democratic Party and the socialist Pracheachon opposition to function, now made an attempt to co-opt young leftists into the Sangkum movement; amongst the prospective candidates Hou Yuon, Chau Sau, Uch Ven and Hu Nim all won seats. Nim became Under-Secretary of State in the office of the Prime Minister, and held a variety of junior ministerial posts over the next nine months. More significantly, he began to build up a substantial base of support in his Kampong Cham constituency, which he was to represent for the next nine years, becoming one of the most visible and well-known Cambodian leftists.

By the early 1960s, Nim had joined the staff of the Sihanoukist daily newspaper Neak Cheat Niyum, and after a trip to Beijing was asked to form the Khmer-Chinese Friendship Association; he also travelled to Pyongyang and to Hanoi, where he met Ho Chi Minh. Continuing his studies in law at the University of Phnom Penh, he completed his doctoral thesis, on land tenure and social structure, in 1965.

The 1966 elections resulted in domination of the Sangkum by its rightist elements, though thanks to his local popularity, Hu Nim (along with Hou Yuon) was able to retain his seat, despite Sihanouk actively campaigning against him. He was briefly made part of a leftist "counter-government" set up by Sihanouk to balance Lon Nol's right-wing cabinet, but from this point the political tide was to turn against the remaining leftists who had not already joined the Communist underground movement.

The situation was inflamed in March–April 1967 by a revolt in the far north-east of the country, the Samlaut Uprising, that was blamed by Sihanouk on left-wing agitation, and specifically, though most likely incorrectly, on the activities of the remaining openly leftist politicians: Hou Yuon, Khieu Samphan, Chau Seng and Hu Nim. The first two men, threatened with arrest, a military tribunal, and calls from right-wing members of the Assembly for their immediate execution, fled to join the Communist guerrillas in late April. Hu Nim was later to write that he initially joined them, but returned to the capital after a few days, having been persuaded by senior cadre Vorn Vet that it might be profitable to continue engagement with Sihanouk and persist in anti-government agitation.

Sihanouk, however, was to respond by calling Nim "dangerous", and to ban the Khmer-Chinese Friendship Association. An attempt by Nim to submit a petition for its reinstatement backfired dramatically, when it was discovered that the cadres who had collected the thumbprints used for signatures had done so under false pretences: Sihanouk called a meeting where he admonished Nim in person as "a little hypocrite" whose "words carry the scent of honey, but [who] hides his claws like a tiger", adding that he "had the face of a Vietnamese or Chinese".

In this climate, it was unsurprising that Nim soon received instructions from Vorn Vet to take to the forests. On 5 October, Sihanouk warned him that he would be "subjected to the military tribunal and the execution block"; he left for the Cardamom Mountains, escaping waiting intelligence agents, two days later. Like Hou Yuon and Khieu Samphan, Nim was widely assumed to have been murdered by Lon Nol's security police.

== The GRUNK ==
Hu Nim was to spend the next three years in the Cardamoms as part of the Communist guerrilla movement.

After the Cambodian coup of 1970, however, in which Sihanouk was deposed by Lon Nol, the situation was to change dramatically. Sihanouk established a Beijing-based government-in-exile, the GRUNK, in collaboration with his former communist enemies, and Hu Nim - now described by Sihanouk as one "of our outstanding intellectuals" was made one of its most prominent figures as Minister for Information.

There were soon disagreements between Nim and the Party 'Centre' led by Saloth Sar (Pol Pot) and Ieng Sary, as Nim - along with Hou Yuon and Khieu Samphan - opposed the party line on the collectivisation of agriculture in the "liberated" areas. Nim was to gain a reputation as one of the more outspoken members of the Party, being generally in favour of more moderate economic policies.

== Democratic Kampuchea ==
Nim was to continue in his post as Minister of Information after the 1975 Communist victory in the Cambodian Civil War, and the establishment of Democratic Kampuchea after the remaining Sihanoukists were purged from the administration. He gained a certain amount of international prominence as the regime spokesman during the Mayaguez incident.

Nim was later implicated in a confession made by Northern Zone commander Koy Thuon, another former schoolteacher, and was arrested by the Party security apparatus on 10 April 1977. Over a period of several months, he was brutally tortured in security prison S-21, where the leader of the interrogation unit was the feared Mam Nai. Nim appears to have only reluctantly implicated himself in 'counterrevolutionary' activity, even displaying what in relative terms seems "extraordinary courage" by including criticism of the Party Standing Committee in his notes. By the time of his last confession on 28 May he wrote: "I have nothing to depend on, only the Communist Party of Kampuchea. Would the Party please show clemency towards me," adding "I am not a human being, I am an animal". He was finally killed on 6 July.

The historiography of the Vietnamese-backed People's Republic of Kampuchea regime, which ousted the Khmer Rouge in 1979, was to emphasise Nim's role as a 'moderate' socialist, with the result that his story is still prominently featured in the Tuol Sleng museum.
