= Fondation Louis-de-Broglie =

Coordinates: 48.846701°N 2.402973°E

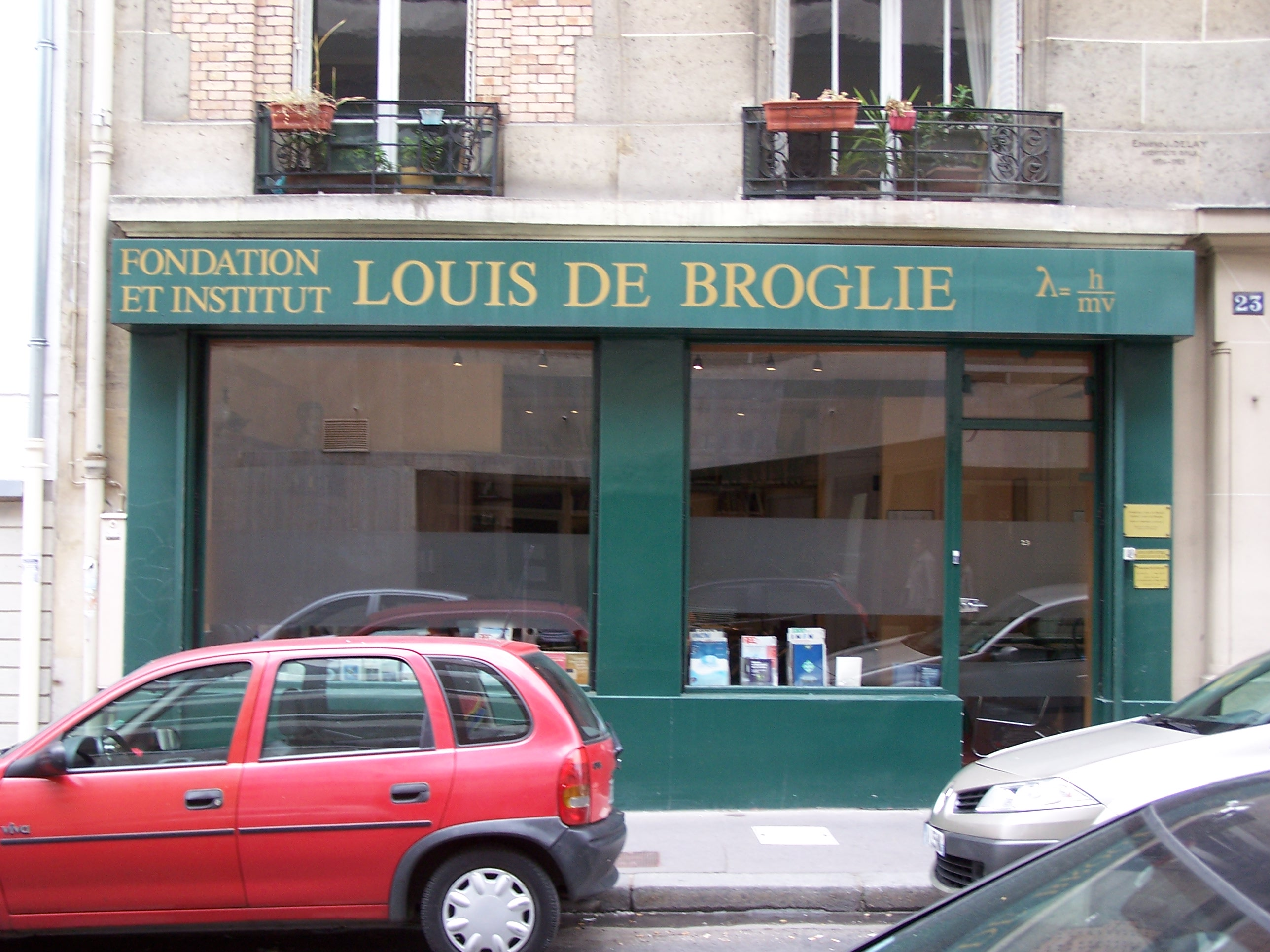
Institut Louis-de-Broglie

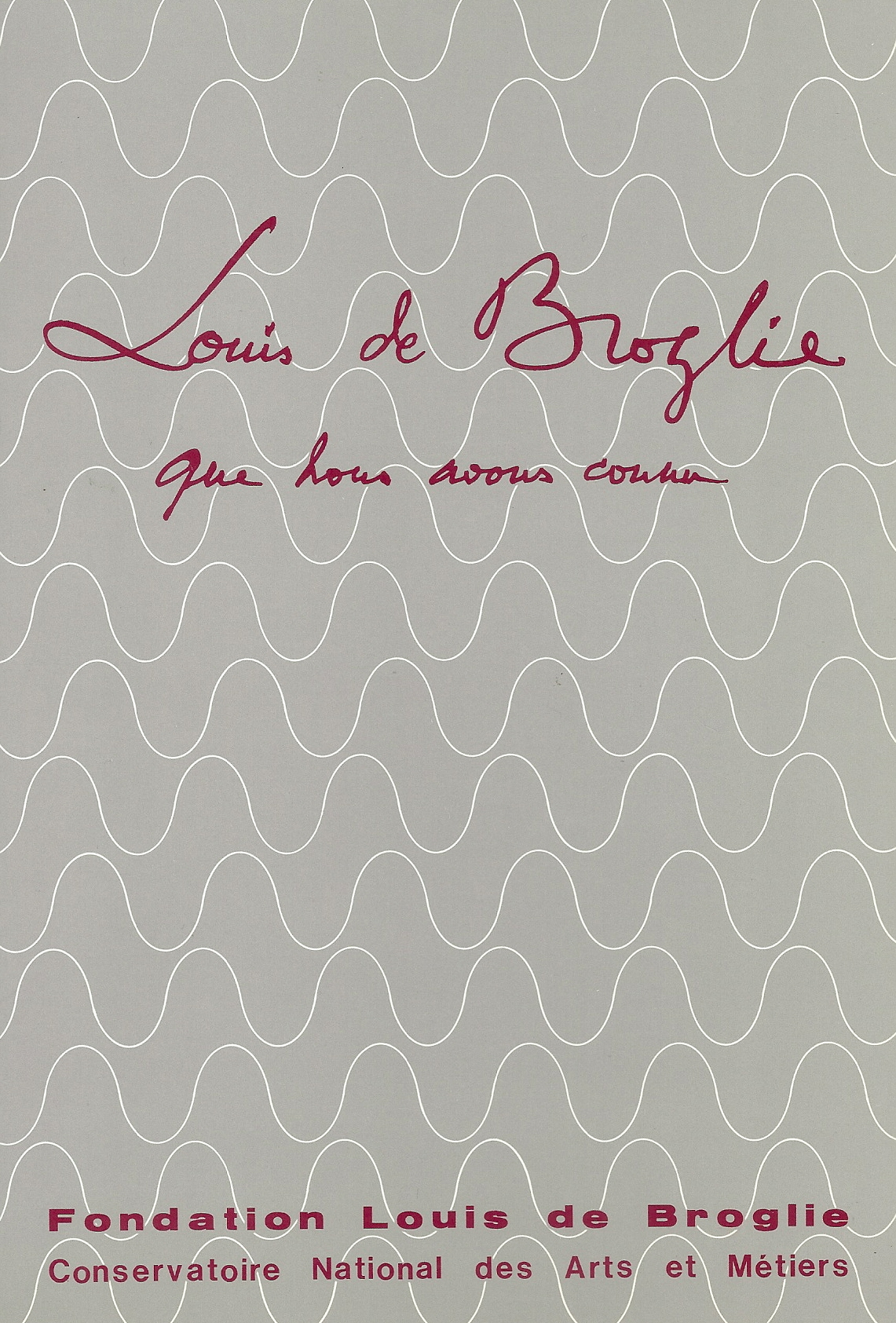
Fondation Louis de Boglie - Archives Philippe Binant

The Fondation Louis-de-Broglie is a French foundation for research into physics. The foundation is located at the French Academy of Sciences in Paris.

== Overview ==
The Fondation Louis-de-Broglie was created at the Conservatoire national des arts et métiers in 1973 by Louis de Broglie on the occasion of the fiftieth anniversary of the discovery of matter waves. Louis de Broglie bequeathed the foundation property acquired thanks to his Nobel prize in physics.

The foundation receives a grant from the Fondation de France.

== Annales de la Fondation Louis de Broglie ==
Annales de la Fondation Louis de Broglie
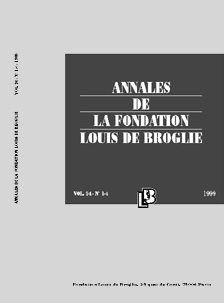
- Discipline: Physics (General)
- Language: English
- Edited by: Michel KARATCHENTZEFF

Publication details
- History: 1975–present
- Publisher: Fondation Louis-de-Broglie (France)
- Frequency: Biannually
- Open access: Yes (Diamond/platinum OA)

Standard abbreviations
- ISO 4: Ann. Fond. Louis de Broglie

Indexing
- ISSN: 2108-6397
- OCLC no.: 793458473

Links
- Journal homepage; Online access

Since 1975 the foundation has published the peer-reviewed, open access, scientific journal Annales de la Fondation Louis de Broglie. Much of the published work centers on the De Broglie–Bohm theory or pilot wave theory of quantum mechanics.

The annals is or has been indexed and abstracted in the following bibliographic databases:

- INSPEC
- Naver
- Norwegian Register for Scientific Journals, Series and Publishers
- Publons
- Scimago
- Scopus
- WorldCat (OCLC)
- Zentralblatt MATH, only up to 2014.

== Presidents ==
- 1973-1991: Louis Néel (Nobel Laureate in Physics)
- 1991-2000: René Thom (Fields Medal recipient)
- 2001–2021: Georges Lochak
- 2021–: Christian de Pange
