= Georges Lochak =

French physicist (1930–2021)

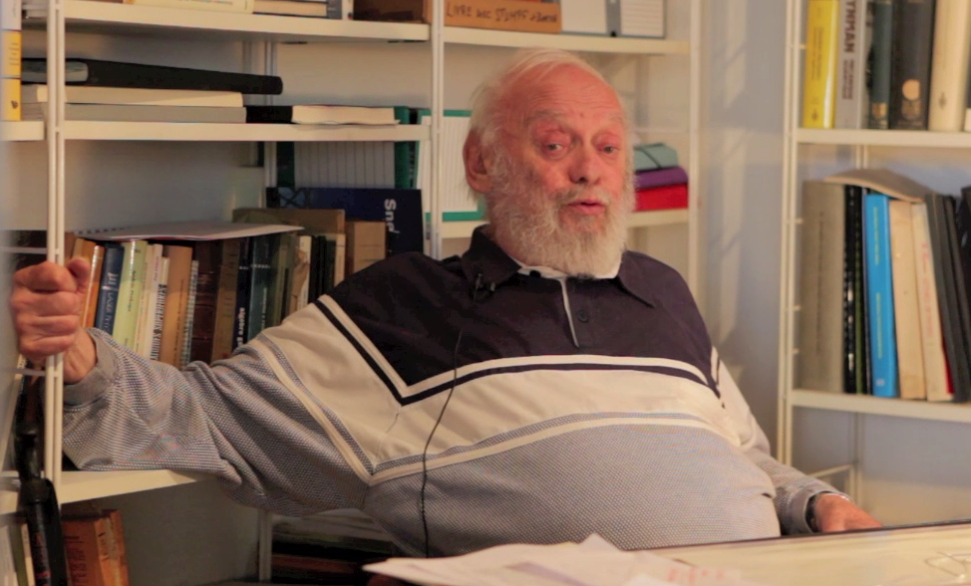
- Born: 12 February 1930; Paris, France
- Died: 4 February 2021 (aged 90); Paris, France
- Citizenship: French
- Education: University of Paris; Institut Henri Poincaré
- Known for: De Broglie–Bohm theory; Magnetic monopole
- Scientific career
- Fields: Physics
- Workplaces: Institut Henri Poincaré; Joint Institute for Nuclear Research; Joliot-Curie-Laboratory for Nuclear Physics; CNRS; Fondation Louis-de-Broglie

Georges Lochak (12 February 1930 – 4 February 2021) was a French physicist known for his work on magnetic monopoles.

== Biography ==
Georges Lochak was born on 12 February 1930 to a Russian family exiled in France due to the Russian Revolution and Russian Civil War. Lochak studied physics and mathematics at the Sorbonne and the Institut Henri Poincaré from 1950 to 1954.

Lochak worked at the Institute Henri Poincaré, the Joint Institute for Nuclear Research (Dubna, Russia) and the Joliot-Curie-Laboratory for Nuclear Physics (University of Paris-Sud). By the time of his retirement in 1996 he was the former director of research at CNRS.

Lochak worked closely with Nobel laureate Louis de Broglie throughout the later part of de Brogile's life and he is currently president of the Fondation Louis-de-Broglie.

Lochak died in Paris on 4 February 2021, at the age of 90.

== Bibliography ==
- Andrade e Silva, J. L.; Lochak, G (1969). Quanta. New York: McGraw-Hill. LCCN 68013139. OCLC 10284.
- Diner, S.; Fargue, D.; Lochak, G. (1982). La Pensee physique contemporaine : science et humanisme en notre temps. Paris: Gauthier-Villars. ISBN 2-904111-00-X. LCCN 83121910. OCLC 299379707.
- de Broglie, Louis; Lochak, G. (1982). Les incertitudes d'Heisenberg et l'interprétation probabiliste de la mécanique ondulatoire : avec des notes critiques de l'auteur. Paris: Gauthier-Villars. ISBN 2-04-015411-6. OCLC 11629332.
- Diner, S.; Lochak, G.; Fargue, D. (1986). Dynamical Systems: A Renewal of Mechanism: Centennial of George David Birkhoff. Singapore: World Scientific. ISBN 9971-5-0150-3. LCCN 86015707. OCLC 13795100.
- de Broglie, Louis (1987). Lochak, G. (ed.). Un itinéraire scientifique. Paris: La Découverte. ISBN 2-7071-1680-7. LCCN 87176955. OCLC 416397137.
- Lochak, G.; Diner, S.; Fargue, D. (1989). L'Objet quantique : comment l'esprit vient aux atomes. Paris: Flammarion. ISBN 2-08-211178-4. OCLC 22358176.
- Lochak, G. (1992). Louis de Broglie : un prince de la science. Paris: Flammarion. ISBN 2-08-211553-4. LCCN 93105795. OCLC 407462654.
- Lochak, G. (1994). La Géométrisation de la physique. Paris: Flammarion. ISBN 2-08-211210-1. LCCN 95150261. OCLC 31630835.
- Borne, T.; Lochak, G.; Stumpf, H. (2001). Nonperturbative Quantum Field Theory and the Structure of Matter. Dordrecht; Boston: Kluwer Academic Publishers. ISBN 0-7923-6803-7. LCCN 00069267. OCLC 228049616.
- Lochak, G. (2002). Défense et illustration de la science : Le savant, la science et l'ombre. Paris: Ellipses. ISBN 2-7298-0962-7. OCLC 50144929.
- Lochak, G. (2008). Voyage au centre de la science au XXe siècle : sur les traces de Louis de Broglie. Paris: Hermann. ISBN 978-2-7056-6727-6. LCCN 2008485432. OCLC 465991502.
