= Duong Sam Ol =

Cambodian politician

General Duong Sam Ol (Khmer: ដួង សាំអុល) is the former Minister for National Defense of Cambodia. He was a Politburo member of the NUFK Central Committee.
