= Sarin Chhak =

Cambodian statesman and diplomat

Minister of Foreign Affairs
- In office 17 April 1975 – 4 April 1976
- Prime Minister: Penn Nouth
- Preceded by: Keuky Lim
- Succeeded by: Ieng Sary

Personal details
- Born: Khin Kaing; 2 January 1922 Takéo, Cambodia
- Died: 1979 (aged 57) Hanoi, Vietnam
- Party: National United Front of Kampuchea (1970–1976); Sangkum (1955–1970)
- Education: Phnom Penh University (LLB); University of Paris (PhD)

Sarin Chhak (Khmer: សារិន ឆាក; 2 January 1922 – 1979) was a Cambodian statesman and diplomat who served as Minister of Foreign Affairs from 1975 to 1976. He died in 1979 in Vietnamese custody following the Vietnamese invasion of Cambodia.

He was an expert in borders. He graduated with a PhD from the University of Paris in 1966 with his thesis titled Les frontières du Cambodge (The Borders of Cambodia).
