= Étienne Manac'h =

Étienne Manac'h (later known as Étienne Manoël Manac'h; February 3, 1910 – 1992) was a French career diplomat and author.

== Life ==
=== Early life ===
Étienne Manac'h was born in Plouigneau, Brittany. He attended Morlaix Collège from 1922 until 1925, and following the family's move to Paris attended the Lycée Buffon, where he received his baccalauréat in 1929. After the classe préparatoire at the Lycée Louis-le-Grand he studied philosophy at the Sorbonne, graduating in 1931 and obtaining his Diplôme d'études supérieures in 1934. After teaching in France and military service, he went on to teach philosophy and French literature at Galatasaray High School, Istanbul between 1938 and 1942.

=== Diplomatic career ===
In 1941 he started working for the Free French movement in Turkey, heading operations there from 1942, and was charged with developing clandestine contacts to members of the Résistance working in Vichy French embassies in the Balkan States. From 1945 to 1951, he was stationed in Czechoslovakia, first as Embassy Secretary in Prague, then as consul general in Bratislava. Along with other Western diplomats, he was expelled from the country in 1951, allegedly for espionage and support for "elements hostile to the regime". Between 1951 and 1969, he held various posts, including director of the cabinet of the socialist Minister of State Guy Mollet (1958–1959) and director of Asie-Océanie à l'Administration Centrale (Central Administration for Far Eastern Affairs) at the foreign ministry (Quai d'Orsay) from 1960–1969, where he was influential in setting up negotiations between Washington and Hanoi during the Vietnam War. From 1969 to 1975, Manac'h served as French ambassador to the People's Republic of China.

=== Controversy surrounding possible activity as a Soviet agent ===
Manac'h was a member of the French Communist Party from 1934 to 1939, thus leaving himself vulnerable to accusations of espionage (after the war he became a socialist and was a member of the SFIO from c. 1959 to 1969). During the Second World War, he had official contacts to the Soviet secret service and later as a diplomat he was responsible for relations with the Soviet Union and other Eastern European countries.

=== Later life ===
In 1975 he retired to Pont-Aven in his native Brittany, buying the house Lezaven, where the painter Paul Gauguin had his studio. He died there, 17 years later.

== Bibliography ==
- Compagnons d’Europe / Hervé Kerven [pseudon.]. - Paris, Julliard, 1949
- Mémoires d'Extrême Asie / Étienne M. Manac'h (3 vol., Paris, Fayard, 1977–1982)
- Emilio: récit à voix basse / Étienne M. Manac'h ; [avec la collab. de Nella Masutti]. - Paris, Plon, 1990.
- Journal intime 1926-1939: Paris, Berlin, Moscou, Istanbul / Étienne Manac'h. - Morlaix, Skol Vreizh, 2008.
- Journal intime 1939-1951: De la France libre à la Guerre froide / Étienne Manac'h. - Morlaix, Skol Vreizh, 2010.
