= Koy Thuon =

Cambodian politician (1933–1977)

- កុយ ធួន
- Born: 1933; French Indochina
- Died: 1977 (aged 43–44); Democratic Kampuchea
- Occupation: Politician

Koy Thuon (Khmer: កុយ ធួន Kŏy Thuŏn, 1933–1977) was a Cambodian politician, intellectual and a member of the Central Committee of the Khmer Rouge. A former high school teacher, he had joined the revolutionary movement in the 1960s and had risen to become Finance Minister of Democratic Kampuchea and leader of the Northern Zone before being arrested along with all his colleagues and associates in 1977, sent to the infamous S-21 concentration camp. He was replaced by Ta Pok as the leader of the Northern Zone and executed the same year he was arrested.

According to a refugee interviewed by François Ponchaud, the new people were treated decently before the purge. However, according to another refugee interviewed by Michael Vickery, conditions generally deteriorated afterwards. Executions widely increased in scope, formerly being restricted in general to ex-soldiers of the Khmer Republic and high officials, to target new people, local peasants, and party cadres.
