= Keat Chhon =

Cambodian politician

Samdech Setha Vitou Pheakdey Keat Chhon GCRS
- គាត ឈន់
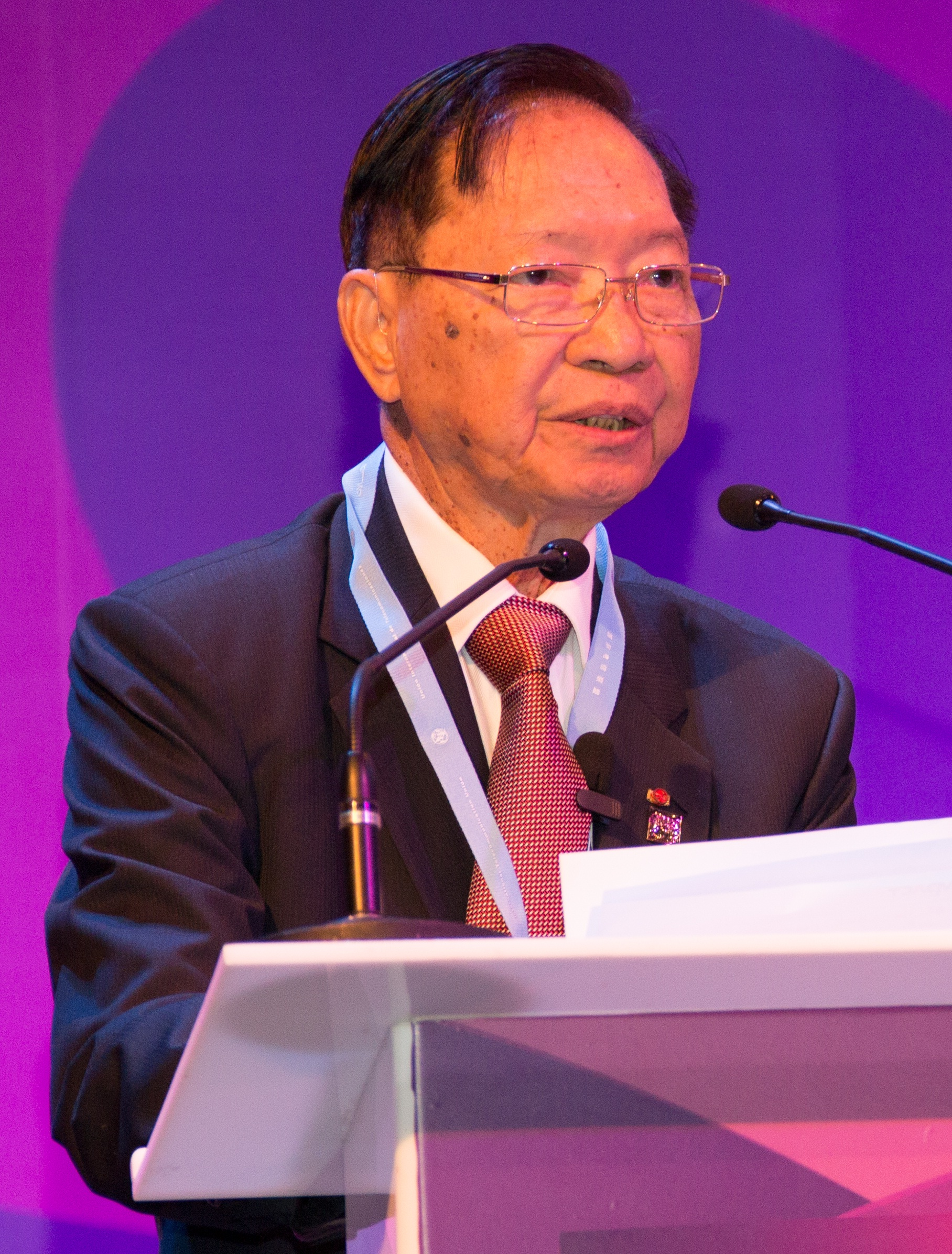
- Chhon in 2013

Minister of Economy and Finance
- In office 24 October 1994 – 23 September 2013
- Prime Minister: Norodom Ranariddh; Ung Huot; Hun Sen
- Preceded by: Sam Rainsy
- Succeeded by: Aun Pornmoniroth

Deputy Prime Minister of Cambodia
- In office 25 September 2008 – 4 April 2016
- Prime Minister: Hun Sen

Member of Parliament for Phnom Penh
- In office 25 November 1998 – 29 July 2018

Member of Parliament for Kampong Cham
- In office 14 June 1993 – 25 November 1998

Personal details
- Born: 11 August 1934 (age 92) Chhloung, Kratié, Cambodia, French Indochina
- Party: Cambodian People's Party
- Spouse: Lay Neari
- Education: Institut national des sciences et techniques nucléaires

Keat Chhon (Khmer: គាត ឈន់; born 11 August 1934) is a Cambodian politician. He belongs to the Cambodian People's Party and was elected to represent Phnom Penh in the National Assembly of Cambodia in 2003. He was the Minister for Economy and Finance from 1994 to 2013. By 2018, he has retired from all public offices.

He is one of the only political leaders to have served in the current government of Cambodia after serving under the Khmer rouge along with five other government officials: Senate President Chea Sim, Foreign Minister Hor Namhong, National Assembly President Heng Samrin and Cambodian People's Party Senators Ouk Bunchhoeun and Sim Ka.

According to researchers Justin Corfield and Laura Summers, he is "one of the most experienced technocrats in the government [of Cambodia], [who] has succeeded in imposing greater budgetary controls on spending for years".

== Biography ==
=== From Chhlong to Saclay: rise of the first Cambodian atomic engineer ===
Keat Chhon was born in the village of Chhlong in the Kratié Province on 11 August 1934. At 13 or 14, he was admitted at the Sihanouk College in Kampong Cham. In 1951, he moved to Phnom Penh to attend the Lycee Sisowath, one of the country's leading secondary schools.

In 1954, Mr. Chhon headed for France, having obtained a student grant. Among Cambodian students, future Khmer Rouge leaders such as Ieng Sary and Khieu Samphan were also students in France at the time. In 1958, he simultaneously pursued two diplomas, one in marine engineering and the other in mathematics and physics. In 1960, Keat obtained a diploma in atomic engineering, from the Saclay Institute of Nuclear Science and Technology in France. At university, he met a certain Lay Neary, a Cambodian of Vietnamese descent, who he married, and in 1961, they returned together to Cambodia with their first child in their arms.

As a young engineer, he participated in the construction of the railroad tracks between Sihanoukville and Phnom Penh, and the Olympic Stadium, with Khmer architect Vann Molyvnann.

=== Minister of Industry under the Sangkum ===
Under the Sangkum, Keat Chhon was appointed Minister of Industry by Norodom Sihanouk. Until 1962, industry grew at an annual rate of 8 percent, but after 1964, the economy went into recession, because of the rise and violence and the decline in construction according caused by Sihanouk's refusal of American aid. In 1964, Chhon was named rector of Kampong Cham University, the country's first university outside Phnom Penh. In the summer of 1966, Keat Chhuon lead the Cambodian delegation to the summer physics colloquium of the Beijing symposium "paying a glowing tribute to the Chinese people's revolutionary spirit". in 1967, Keat Chhon was named Secretary of State.

=== High ranking official under the Khmer Rouge ===
Chhon fled to Beijing with Prince Sihanouk after he was deposed in March 1970 to head the overseas Khmer Rouge resistance fighting against the US-backed Lon Nol regime, who had bombarded his university in Kampong Cham on April 28, 1970, and massacred many Vietnamese living in Cambodia.

He was a close assistant of Prince Sihanouk travelling with him to Hanoi or parts of Cambodia under Khmer Rouge control in 1973. And then, in March 1975, Chhon headed for Cambodia with Khmer Rouge leader Ieng Sary and seven young intellectuals, during the fall of Phnom Penh.

Under the Khmer Rouge regime, he worked under the direction of Ieng Sary in the General Political Department of the Foreign Ministry (B-1), along Thiounn Prasith and other major figures of the regime. Keat Chhon accompanied then-King Norodom Sihanouk on an official visit as figurehead of Democratic Kampuchea to the United Nations secretary-general in October, 1975. He was also accused of being Pol Pot's secretary and adviser by then opposition leader Sam Rainsy.

His wife and two children were to be arrested and taken to the S-21 extermination camp—also known as Tuol Sleng—on January 10, 1979, but the Vietnamese forces walking into Phnom Penh on January 7, 1979, and Chhon fled to Beijing with Prince Sihanouk once again.

=== Exile in France and Zaire ===
During a meeting of the Non-Aligned Movement in Cuba in September 1979, Chhon had his first contact with future Prime Minister Hun Sen, who was foreign minister of the Phnom Penh government at the time. After spending some time on the Thai border at the Khmer Rouge outpost, Keat Chhon obtained refugee status in France in 1983, where he worked in a small engineering firm. In 1988, he started working with the United Nations for a mission in economic development project in Zaire, where he stayed until 1992.

=== Minister of Economy and Finance since the return of democracy ===
==== Reopening the Cambodian economy to the world ====
Having met again with Hun Sen in 1987 and 1988 on behalf of Prince Sihanouk, he took part in the signing of the Paris Peace Agreements in October 1991 and returned to Cambodia on behalf of the United Nations Transitional Authority in 1992 where he joined the Cambodian People's Party. In 1993, he was named as an adviser to the Government of the State of Cambodia and Senior Minister in Charge of Development. In that position, he managed to renew the economic ties of Cambodia beyond the collapsing Soviet economic system. He encouraged the passing of the Law on Investment in 1994 which was considered "liberal" and providing "very generous [...] incentives to investors compared to other countries." While he internally reformed his own ministry weeding out "ghost" staff whose salaries are being pocketed by others, he also opened his country internationally by developing political ties with the ASEAN in order to promote the “integration of [the] Cambodian economy in the region and the world." In November 1994, with the trust of both co-Prime Ministers Prince Norodom Ranariddh and Hun Sen, he was named in replacement of Sam Rainsy as Minister of Economy and Finance, a position which he held until 2004.

==== Balancing Cambodian politics and national budget ====
In April 1995, Sam Rainsy filed a lawsuit against Finance Minister Keat Chhon seeking maximum damages allowed for defamation by UNTAC law in the Phnom Penh Municipal Court after Keat Chhon's public comments in Cambodia that Rainsy was attempting to get all foreign aid to the government suspended inferring that his replacement was guilty of corruption while finance minister.

In January 1996, his relationship with Second Prime Minister Hun Sen came to a high point of tension as the latter accused him of being responsible of over-zealous import inspections by the government-contracted Swiss firm Societe Generale de Surveillance, which led in major loss of profits in the import-export sector, as some speculated Cham Prasidh was eyeing to replace him.

The ball is now at His Excellency Keat Chhon's feet. You kick it or not, you already know me very well.

— Hun Sen, 12 January 1996

In December 1996, the national budget was still recovering and suffering from corruption and diversion of states revenues, as minister in charge of rehabilitation and development, Keat Chhon, unwillingly conceded the government's need to diminish the part of the national budget allocated to the department of education.

On July 5, 1998, Keat Chhon, Minister for Economy and Finance, was in Paris attending the meeting of the Consultative Group for Cambodia and assuring the aid donors about the due process of the elections. He was with Ung Huot, Minister of the Foreign Affairs, when he learned of violence exploding in Cambodia, leading Prince Rannaridh to flee the country. These events led to a certain delay in the admission of Cambodia as member of the ASEAN.

==== Facing land disputes and government waste in a booming economy ====
Keat Chhon became Senior Minister, Minister of Economy and Finance from 2004 to 2008 and since 2008 he has been the Deputy Prime of the Minister for the Minister of Economy and Finance. In that position, despite the 2008 financial crisis, he had to face the growing number of land disputes, in which his own sister was directly involved, and the need to reduce government waste, through more transparency. While the economic growth was real, the government replied to accusations of leaving aside the poor by increasing government social welfare programs, while still continuing land evictions from shanty towns in order to develop new neighbourhoods. The economic boom also entailed a rise in prices, such as gas, which the government tried to control, while Keat Chhon was accused in September 2011 of trying to shut down foreign NGOs interfering in Cambodian politics. That same year, after many delays since 2007, Keat Chhon also opened the Cambodia Securities Exchange (CSX).

=== Retirement ===
Along with two other long-serving ministers—Foreign Minister Hor Namhong, Minister of Land Management Im Chhun Lim, Deputy Prime Minister Keat Chhon retired in March 2016 out of old age.

== Family ==
He is married to Lay Neari and has two children.

== Legacy ==
=== Reforming the banking sector in Cambodia ===
From 1996 to 2002, as Minister of Economy and Finance, Keat Chhon led a dramatic reform of the banking sector in Cambodia "to support the flight to quality of the banking system". These "impressive performances" led to the dispersion of many actors of the hypertrophied banking sector; three quarters of the banks operating in Cambodia in 1996 had their licenses revoked or had left voluntarily.

These measures [were] necessary to establish a sound banking system, promote savings, and increase the confidence of the public in the banking system.

— Keat Chhon, Speech at the 34th Annual meeting of the Board of Governors of the Asian Development Bank, May 19, 2001

=== Resisting to the 1997 Asian financial crisis ===
After the Cambodian economy, as other Asian economies, had suffered from the 1997 Asian financial crisis and experienced economic downturn, Keat Chhon was able to see signs of restored confidence and recovery through consumer confidence encouraged by adequate policies and measures with the assistance of the international community and especially of the World Bank and the International Monetary Fund. It was a particular effort of Cambodian diplomacy to negotiate this help after the 1997 Cambodian coup d'état in order to solve what Keat Chhon warned would be an "inflationary spiral and monetary wildness". The international recognition of the 1998 Cambodian general election under the supervision of the National Election Committee headed by Chheng Phon contributed to this normalization of international recognition of the government of Cambodia.

=== Spreading English in Cambodia ===
While Cambodia is a member of the Organisation internationale de la Francophonie, and while Keat Chhon had been closer to China at an earlier stage of his life, he encouraged the move of government institutions towards the use of English as lingua franca insisting the staff "need to know three or four foreign languages" with "English [being] the first priority.

=== From Chinese communism to a free-market economy ===
Along with many survivors of his generation, Keat Chhon championed the transition of the Cambodian economy from a centralized communist economy on the Chinese maoist model to a free-market economy. This move was not merely practical but quite conscious, as Keat Chhon increasingly defended the rule of law:

Cognisant of the correlation between the rule of law and economic growth … our responses to the crises respect the rule of law and economic freedom.

— Keat Chhon

== Honors ==
- Grand Cordon of the Order of the Rising Sun (2017)
- Honorary Doctorate in Development Economics from the University of Cambodia (2005)
- Honorary Doctorate in Business Administration, Charles Sturt University (2003)

== Bibliography ==
- Aun Porn Moniroth, Keat Chhon, and Vongsey Vissoth. Managing the Challenges of Globalization. January 1998, Economics and Finance Institute, Phnom Penh, Cambodia.
- Aun Porn Moniroth and Keat Chhon, Economic Development in Cambodia in the ASEAN context: policies and strategies, 1998, Cambodian Institute for Cooperation and Peace, Phnom Penh, Cambodia.
- Gardère, Jean-Daniel (2016-08-15). Une histoire cambodgienne: Les 4 vies de l'étonnant M. Keat Chhon (in French). Editions L'Harmattan. ISBN 978-2-14-001576-2.
