= Vorn Vet =

Cambodian politician

- វ៉ន វេត
- Vorn Vet in 1978

Deputy Prime Minister for Economy and Finance
- In office 30 March 1976 – November 1978

Personal details
- Born: Sok Thuok (សុក ធួក); 1931 French Indochina
- Died: 1978 (aged 46–47) Democratic Kampuchea

Vorn Vet (Khmer: វ៉ន វេត; 1931–1978), born Sok Thuok (សុក ធួក), was a Cambodian politician who served as deputy prime minister for the economy of Democratic Kampuchea. He was responsible for appointing Kang Kek Iew to his position as head of Special Security. He was murdered at the S-21 security camp in 1978 after he led an unsuccessful coup d'état in December 1978 against the regime of Pol Pot.
