= Hou Yuon =

Cambodian politician

Personal details
- Born: 1930 Kampong Cham Province, Cambodia, French Indochina
- Died: Unknown; possibly August 1975 Kampuchea
- Party: Communist Party

Hou Yuon (Khmer: ហ៊ូ យន់, 1930 – August 1975 (or later)) was a veteran of the communist movement in Cambodia. A member of the Communist Party of Kampuchea, also known as the Khmer Rouge, he served in several ministerial posts during the 1960s (as a member of the non-communist government of Prince Norodom Sihanouk) and 1970s.

Yuon, who repeatedly clashed with other members of the Khmer Rouge leadership on policy issues, disappeared after 1975. Reports vary concerning the circumstances of his death.

== Early career ==
Hou Yuon was born in Kampong Cham in 1930 to a family of Sino-Khmer descent. In common with several other future members of the Khmer Rouge, he studied at the Lycée Sisowath, though unlike the majority of his colleagues at that school, he was from a poor background: his father was a peasant who grew rice and tobacco.

He went on to study economics and law, earning a doctorate from the University of Paris. The doctoral dissertation he wrote expressed basic themes that were later to become the cornerstones of many of the economic policies adopted by Democratic Kampuchea. The central role of the peasants in national development was espoused in his 1955 thesis, The Cambodian Peasants and Their Prospects for Modernization (French: La paysannerie du Cambodge et ses projets de modernisation), which challenged the conventional view that urbanization and industrialization are necessary precursors of development.

Yuon, who enjoyed great personal popularity - he was described as having "truly astounding physical and intellectual strength" - became an important figure in the community of radical Cambodian expatriates in Paris. He was a unanimous choice as head of the Khmer Students' Association (KSA). In 1952, along with Saloth Sar, Ieng Sary, and other leftists, Yuon gained notoriety by sending an open letter to the then-King Norodom Sihanouk, calling him the "strangler of infant democracy." After the French authorities closed down the KSA, Yuon and Khieu Samphan helped to establish a new group, the Khmer Students' Union, in 1956.

After returning to Cambodia, Hou Yuon became a teacher of French at a new private high school, the Lycée Kambuboth, which he helped establish.

== In Cambodian domestic politics 1958-67 ==
Sihanouk, by now Prime Minister of an independent Cambodia, invited a number of prominent leftists, including Hou Yuon, into his Sangkum party and government to provide a balance to the right-wing. Yuon was to serve in several ministries between 1958 and 1963. He was eventually forced to resign after losing a vote of no-confidence in the National Assembly; he was considered to have committed lèse majesté by not following Sihanouk's demands closely enough. However, despite his open public disagreements with Sihanouk - he once accused Sihanouk of using scarce electric power to light his own street, and was the target of Sihanouk's most furious personal tirades - he approved of the Sangkum policies of nationalisation implemented after 1964.

In 1964, Yuon was also to publish a revision of his 1956 book The Co-Operative Question, which now formally proposed an alliance between socialists and Sihanouk's regime. It contained an in-depth study of how co-operative organisation might help poorer farmers and peasants, particularly in avoiding the need to use unscrupulous money-lenders, and redress the urban "oppression" of rural areas: though contrary to the line later adopted by the Khmer Rouge, Yuon identified that city workers or landowning peasants did not themselves oppress the poor peasantry.

In the 1966 National Assembly elections, Sihanouk abandoned his previous policy of nominating one candidate for each electoral district. Most leftist Sangkum deputies now had to compete with members of the traditional elite: only Hou Yuon, Hu Nim and Khieu Samphan chose to stand, their task made harder by Sihanouk actively campaigning against them: nevertheless, Yuon won by a large margin in his constituency, receiving 78% of the vote. Later that year he was briefly made part of a "counter-government" set up by Sihanouk to balance the right-wing cabinet of Prime Minister Lon Nol. However, after the Samlaut Uprising of 1967, Yuon was accused by Sihanouk of stirring up unrest, and threatened with arrest and possible execution: he fled to join the communist maquis, led by Saloth Sar (Pol Pot), Ieng Sary and Son Sen, in the forests.

== In the GRUNK ==
After the Cambodian coup of 1970 in which Sihanouk was ousted by Lon Nol, Yuon became a part of the GRUNK, the Beijing-based government-in-exile that was formed as a coalition between Sihanouk and the communists. Yuon was made Minister for Cooperatives, and caused serious rifts between himself and other members of the Khmer Rouge leadership by protesting at the speed with which collectivisation was being carried out in the 'liberated' areas. As early as 1970, he had publicly criticised Pol Pot, complaining that the Party was using his name as a "screen" by making him a "puppet minister". He also argued against the abolition of markets, allegedly warning Pol Pot and Nuon Chea "If you go on like this, I give your regime three years. Then it will collapse".

Yuon's outspoken criticisms of Khmer Rouge policy led to him spending a brief period in a 're-education' camp, K6, in 1974. However his personal friendship with Pol Pot and his general popularity, both with the peasantry and with expatriate Cambodian intellectuals, led to a period of reinstatement in the Party leadership during 1975.

== Death ==
Yuon's death is thought to have been ordered by his fellow-members of the Khmer Rouge sometime after they seized power in 1975. His previous tendency to openly criticise the regime's excesses appears to have continued unabated: when entering Phnom Penh, which had been divided into several sectors each run by the administration of a different zone of the country, he is reported to have remarked "It's Berlin!". Several accounts exist of his death, the most common of which is related to the controversial order to evacuate Phnom Penh given after the communist victory, which Yuon is known to have opposed. In one version, related by a CPK cadre from Kampong Cham, Yuon was said to have been shot in August 1975 by a group of Khmer Rouge soldiers after he sympathetically addressed a group of evacuees at Prek Por, Srey Santhor District, and his body thrown into the Mekong.

Other witnesses claim that Yuon was seen at a camp in Stung Treng late in 1976, and most probably either died of disease, or committed suicide, while being held in the camp system. Another Khmer Rouge source claimed that Yuon was mistakenly shot by a bodyguard after being recalled to Phnom Penh.

It has been noted that in Khmer Rouge discourse after 1978, Yuon was referred to in terms indicating that he had been posthumously rehabilitated.
