= List of ambassadors of the United States to Cambodia =

Ambassador of the United States to Cambodia
- ឯកអគ្គរដ្ឋទូតនៃសហរដ្ឋអាមេរិកប្រចាំនៅកម្ពុជា
- Seal of the United States Department of State

- Flag of a United States ambassador

- Incumbent; Christopher J. Anderson since November 7, 2026
- Nominator: President of the United States
- Appointer: The president; with Senate advice and consent
- Inaugural holder: Donald R. Heath as Envoy Extraordinary and Minister Plenipotentiary
- Formation: June 29, 1950; 76 years ago
- Website: U.S. Embassy – Phnom Penh

This is a list of ambassadors of the United States to Cambodia.

Until 1953 Cambodia had been French protectorate as a part of French Indochina, but became independent on November 9, 1953. The United States had appointed its first envoy to Cambodia, Donald R. Heath, in 1950. Heath was a non-resident minister who was commissioned to Cambodia, Laos, and Vietnam, while resident in Saigon.

Diplomatic relations between Cambodia and the United States were broken twice: The first time between 1965 and 1969, and the second time in 1975 just before the Khmer Rouge regime gained control of the country. Relations were finally restored in 1991.

The U.S. Embassy in Cambodia is located in Phnom Penh.

== Ambassadors ==
Name	Portrait	Appointed	Presentation of credentials	Termination of mission	President
Donald R. Heath		June 29, 1950	July 11, 1950	October 2, 1954	Harry S. Truman (1945–1953)
Donald R. Heath		June 29, 1950	July 11, 1950	October 2, 1954	Dwight D. Eisenhower (1953–1961)
Robert McClintock		August 18, 1954	October 2, 1954	October 15, 1956	Dwight D. Eisenhower (1953–1961)
Carl W. Strom		October 11, 1956	December 7, 1956	March 8, 1959	Dwight D. Eisenhower (1953–1961)
William C. Trimble		February 16, 1959	April 23, 1959	June 8, 1962	Dwight D. Eisenhower (1953–1961)
William C. Trimble		February 16, 1959	April 23, 1959	June 8, 1962	John F. Kennedy (1961–1963)
Philip D. Sprouse		June 28, 1962	August 20, 1962	March 3, 1964	John F. Kennedy (1961–1963)
Philip D. Sprouse		June 28, 1962	August 20, 1962	March 3, 1964	Lyndon B. Johnson (1963–1969)
Randolph A. Kidder		July 9, 1964	did not present credentials	September 18, 1964	Lyndon B. Johnson (1963–1969)
Office vacant from 1964 to 1970.
Emory C. Swank		September 3, 1970	September 15, 1970	September 5, 1973	
Emory C. Swank		September 3, 1970	September 15, 1970	September 5, 1973	Richard Nixon (1969–1974)
John Gunther Dean		March 14, 1974	April 3, 1974	April 12, 1975	Richard Nixon (1969–1974)
John Gunther Dean		March 14, 1974	April 3, 1974	April 12, 1975	Gerald Ford (1974–1977)
Office vacant from 1975 to 1994.
Charles H. Twining		May 13, 1994	May 17, 1994	November 20, 1995	
Charles H. Twining		May 13, 1994	May 17, 1994	November 20, 1995	Bill Clinton (1993–2001)
Kenneth M. Quinn		December 12, 1995	March 28, 1996	July 25, 1999	Bill Clinton (1993–2001)
Kent M. Wiedemann		June 7, 1999	August 31, 1999	May 16, 2002	Bill Clinton (1993–2001)
Kent M. Wiedemann		June 7, 1999	August 31, 1999	May 16, 2002	George W. Bush (2001–2009)
Charles A. Ray		November 15, 2002	January 4, 2003	July 11, 2005	George W. Bush (2001–2009)
Joseph A. Mussomeli		June 27, 2005	September 22, 2005	December 25, 2008	George W. Bush (2001–2009)
Carol A. Rodley		October 24, 2008	January 20, 2009	September 29, 2011	George W. Bush (2001–2009)
Carol A. Rodley		October 24, 2008	January 20, 2009	September 29, 2011	Barack Obama (2009–2017)
William E. Todd		April 2, 2012	June 8, 2012	August 14, 2015	Barack Obama (2009–2017)
William A. Heidt		September 14, 2015	December 2, 2015	November 28, 2018	Barack Obama (2009–2017)
William A. Heidt		September 14, 2015	December 2, 2015	November 28, 2018	Donald Trump (2017–2021)
W. Patrick Murphy		August 8, 2019	October 19, 2019	May 18, 2024	Donald Trump (2017–2021)
W. Patrick Murphy		August 8, 2019	October 19, 2019	May 18, 2024	Joe Biden (2021–2025)
Christopher J. Anderson		November 7, 2026	November 10, 2026	Incumbent	Donald Trump (2025–present)

Source: List of U.S. Ambassadors to Cambodia

=== Interim ===
- Bridgette L. Walker (August 12, 2024–May 15, 2026)
- Benjamin Chiang (May 15, 2026–June 22, 2026)
- Aleks Zittle (June 22, 2026–November 7, 2026)

== See also ==
- Cambodia – United States relations
- Foreign relations of Cambodia
- Ambassadors of the United States
