= Joseph A. Mussomeli =

American lawyer (born 1952)

Joseph Adamo Mussomeli
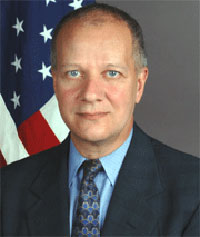
- Born: May 26, 1952 (age 74); New York City, New York, U.S.
- Other name: Ambassador Joseph Adamo Mussomeli

Joseph Adamo Mussomeli (born May 26, 1952) is an American diplomat who has worked for the United States Department of State and is the former U.S. Ambassador to the Republic of Slovenia and the Kingdom of Cambodia.

== Early life ==
Mussomeli's grandparents on both sides of the family immigrated to America from Sicily around the turn of the 19th century. Mussomeli was born in New York City on May 26, 1952. His father, Mariano Mussomeli, was an officer in the United States Army and served in both World War II and the Korean War. As such, Joseph moved around the US somewhat in his youth, and also lived for some time in Germany.

By his high school years, his family had settled down in Cherry Hill, New Jersey. He graduated from Camden Catholic High School in 1970, going from there to Rutgers University-Camden for two years before taking time off to hitch-hike through Europe. Upon returning to the United States, he attended Trenton State College (now The College of New Jersey) and graduated summa cum laude in 1975, earning a BA in Political Science. In 1978, he earned a Juris Doctor degree from Rutgers School of Law-Newark.

== Career ==
After law school, Mussomeli spent some years working in the legal field, working as a Deputy Attorney General of New Jersey, before entering the US Foreign Service in September 1980. His first overseas posting was in Cairo, Egypt, as a general service officer (GSO). After that, he returned to Washington, D.C., where he worked at the Department of State as staff assistant to the Undersecretary for Security Assistance. His next overseas assignment was in Embassy Manila, Philippines, as a consular officer from 1984 to 1986, to which he would later return in 2002 as Deputy Chief of Mission (DCM). Before that time, however, his tours included: North Korea Desk Officer (1986–1988), Senior Watch Officer (1989–1990), Economic Counselor in Colombo, Sri Lanka (1990–1992), Inspector for the Office of Inspector General (1992–1994), Political Counselor in Rabat, Morocco (1995–1998), Deputy Chief of Mission in Manama, Bahrain (1998–2001), and as a member of the Senior Seminar (2001–2002). During his second tour in the Philippines as DCM, he served as Chargé d'affaires for a year while the Ambassador, Frank Ricciardone, was away. On June 24, 2005, the United States Senate confirmed him as U.S. Ambassador to the Kingdom of Cambodia. He then went on to serving as the Director of Human Resources/ELCDA at the U.S. Department of State in Washington, D.C., for one year. In May 2008, he served for one year in Kabul, Afghanistan as the Assistant Chief of Mission. On September 29, 2010, the United States Senate confirmed him as the U.S. Ambassador to the Republic of Slovenia. He left Slovenia in 2015.

Mussomeli has received several awards including the 2010 Arnie Raphael Award, the 2008 Presidential Distinguished Service Award, two Superior Honor Awards, one Group Superior Honor Award, and two Meritorious Honor Awards.

== Family and hobbies ==
Mussomeli's late wife was Sharon Flack Mussomeli. He has three children: Isaac, Thomas, and Lucca. In his spare time, Mussomeli enjoys writing poetry and short plays, going on walks, reading about history, and playing tennis and bocce ball.

Diplomatic posts
| Preceded by Francis J. Ricciardone Jr. | United States Ambassador to the Philippines; Chargé d'affaires a.i. 2005 | Succeeded by Darryl N. Johnson; Chargé d'affaires a.i. |
| Preceded by Charles A. Ray | United States Ambassador to Cambodia; 2005–2008 | Succeeded by Carol A. Rodley |
| Preceded by Yousif Ghafari | United States Ambassador to Slovenia; 2010–2015 | Succeeded by Brent R. Hartley |
