= Cambodia–United States relations =

- Cambodia: United States

Diplomatic mission
- Embassy of Cambodia, Washington, D.C.: United States Embassy, Phnom Penh

Envoy
- Ambassador Chum Sounry: Ambassador Christopher J. Anderson

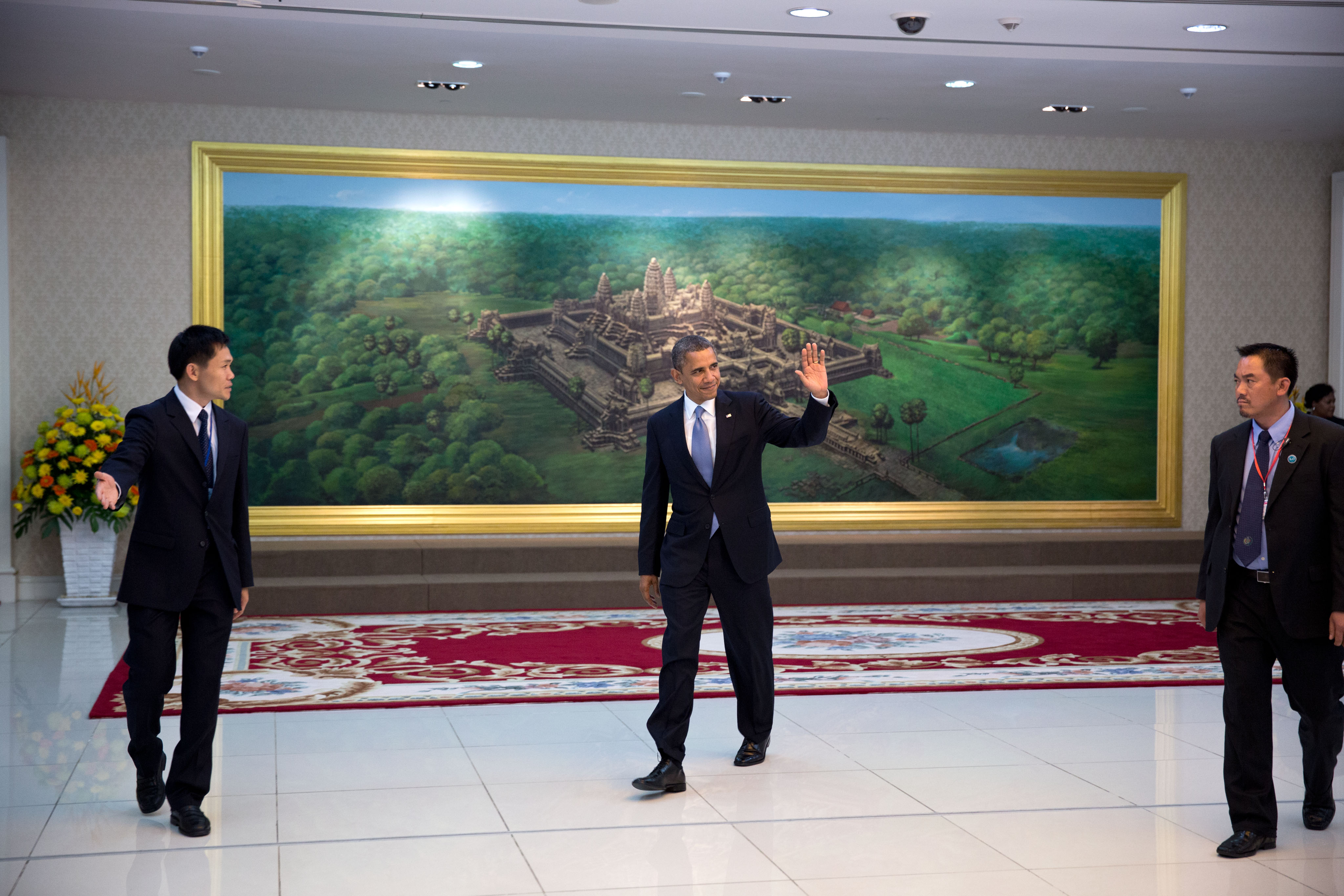
Barack Obama arriving at the Peace Palace, Phnom Penh, 2012

Bilateral relations between the United States and Cambodia, while strained throughout the Cold War, have strengthened considerably in modern times. The U.S. supports efforts in Cambodia to combat terrorism, build democratic institutions, promote human rights, foster economic development, and eliminate corruption.

According to a 2011 Gallup poll, 68% of Cambodians approved of the job performance of the United States under the Obama administration, with 7% disapproving, the most favorable opinion for any surveyed Asia–Pacific nation. In a 2012 Gallup Poll, 62% of Cambodians approved of U.S. leadership, with 8% disapproving. President Barack Obama's visit to Phnom Penh in 2012 made history as the first U.S. presidential visit to Cambodia.

== History ==
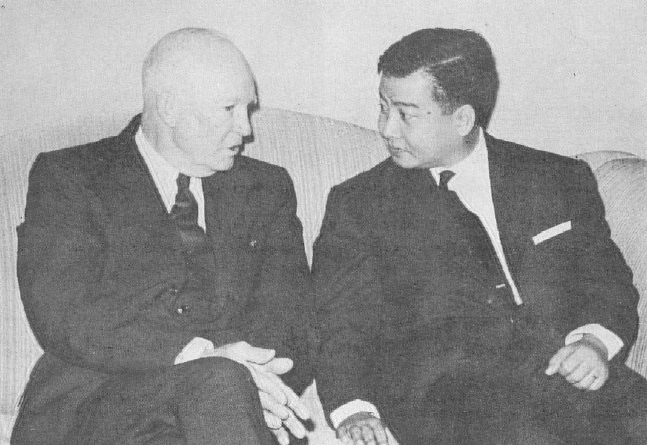
President Dwight D. Eisenhower and Prince Norodom Sihanouk in 1959

Between 1955 and 1963, the United States provided $409.6 million in economic grant aid and $83.7 million in military assistance. This aid was used primarily to repair damage caused by the Indochina War, to support internal security forces, and for the construction of an all-weather road to the seaport of Sihanoukville, which gave Cambodia its first direct access to the sea and access to the southwestern hinterlands. Relations deteriorated in the early 1960s. Diplomatic relations were broken by Cambodia in May 1965, but were reestablished on July 2, 1969. U.S. relations continued after the establishment of the Khmer Republic until the U.S. mission was evacuated during the fall of Phnom Penh on April 12, 1975.

During the 1970–1975 war, the United States provided $1.18 billion in military assistance to the Khmer National Armed Forces in their fight against the Khmer Rouge as well as $503 million in economic assistance. The United States condemned the brutal character of Democratic Kampuchea between 1975 and 1979. Relations worsened after the Mayaguez incident when the Liberation Navy of Kampuchea captured the SS Mayaguez and the U.S. Marine Corps responded by raiding the island of Koh Tang. However, the fact that this regime was toppled in the Cambodian–Vietnamese War by Vietnam, which the United States regarded as a hostile power, led to U.S. condemnation of the Vietnamese invasion. The United States recognized the Coalition Government of Democratic Kampuchea (which included the Khmer Rouge) as the legitimate government of Cambodia. Ben Kiernan claimed that the U.S. offered material support to the Khmer Rouge after the Vietnamese invasion. Other sources have disputed these claims, and described extensive fighting between the U.S.-backed forces of the Khmer People's National Liberation Front and the Khmer Rouge.

Concurrent with these efforts, the United States supported ASEAN's efforts in the 1980s to achieve a political settlement of the Cambodian Civil War that would include the Khmer Rouge in the government. This was accomplished on October 23, 1991, when the Paris Conference reconvened to sign a comprehensive settlement.

The U.S. Mission in Phnom Penh opened on May 13, 1994, headed by career diplomat Charles H. Twining Jr., who was designated U.S. Special Representative to the SNC. On January 3, 1992, the U.S. lifted its embargo against Cambodia, thus normalizing economic relations with the country. The United States also ended blanket opposition to lending to Cambodia by international financial institutions. When the freely elected Royal Government of Cambodia was formed on September 24, 1993, the United States and the Kingdom of Cambodia immediately established full diplomatic relations. The U.S. Mission was upgraded to a U.S. embassy, and in May 1994 Mr. Twining became the U.S. ambassador. After the factional fighting in 1997 and Hun Sen's legal machinations to depose First Prime Minister Norodom Ranariddh, the United States suspended bilateral assistance to the Cambodian Government. At the same time, many U.S. citizens and other expatriates were evacuated from Cambodia and, in the subsequent weeks and months, more than 40,000 Cambodian refugees fled to Thailand. The 1997 events also left a long list of uninvestigated human rights abuses, including dozens of extrajudicial killings. Since 1997 until recently, U.S. assistance to the Cambodian people has been provided mainly through non-governmental organizations, which flourish in Cambodia.

== Present status ==
Since 2017, relations between the two countries have grown increasingly strained under calls by the United States to halt what it says is significant democratic backsliding and closer military ties with the People's Republic of China. According to the U.S. State Department, the Cambodian government's crackdown on journalists, human rights activists, and political opposition has transformed the country from a developing democracy inclusive of independent media to a "de facto one-party—and increasingly authoritarian—state intolerant of dissent." In late 2017, the government of Cambodia banned the Cambodia National Rescue Party (CNRP), the nation's largest opposition party, short of the 2018 national assembly election, clearing the way for the ruling Cambodian People's Party (CPP) which prompted the United States to impose sanctions on senior Cambodian officials in hopes of reversing the nation's apparent descent into authoritarianism.

Of further concern to the United States, Cambodia has greatly reduced its military partnership with the U.S. and strengthened its military ties with China. In 2017, Cambodia suspended all combined military operations with the United States and began training with the People's Liberation Army (PLA). In 2019, the Wall Street Journal published a report detailing a secret deal between Beijing and Phnom Penh to allow the stationing of PLA troops at Ream Naval Base. In 2020, Cambodia demolished a Cambodian Navy tactical headquarters funded and built by the United States and after broke ground on the new Beijing-funded Ream Naval Base. At the groundbreaking ceremony, Wang Wentian, China's ambassador to Cambodia, announced that the project would deepen the "iron-clad partnership" between the two nation's militaries. Souring military and political relations with the Washington and improving relations with Beijing have caused many to speculate that Cambodia views China as a closer ally.

Following the 2023 general election, the U.S. took steps to impose visa restrictions on individuals it deemed had "undermined democracy" and also implemented a pause of certain foreign assistance programs. The U.S. State Department also named jailed union leader Chhim Sithar as one of its Human Rights Defender Award recipients for 2023. She is the first Cambodian to receive this award.

=== US economic actions on Cambodia ===
By the 2020s, Cambodia's solar panel industry, initially supported by Chinese investment, experienced challenges due to US actions against Chinese production in other countries. These resulted with manufacturers shifting strategies or shutting down. In 2023, solar exports peaked at US$2.4 billion, but by the first half of this year, exports fell to US$4.4 million. Cambodia was slapped with a 49% tariff by the Trump administration, the highest tariff given by the US to any Southeast Asian nation, on April 2, 2025, but was lowered to 19% on August 1. Cambodian prime minister Hun Manet urged business and communities for "industrial recalibration" as the country faces US economic pressures.

In May 2025, the US Treasury proposed banning Cambodian firm Huione Group in the US due to money laundering concerns. Reuters identified Cambodian businessman Hun To, cousin of Prime Minister Hun Manet, as a director of Huione Pay within the group.

Subsequently, in October 2025, the US Department of Justice indicted and charged Chen Zhi, Chairman of Prince Holding Group and a close ally to Hun Sen over fraud practices and pig butchering scams and seized 15 billion U.S. dollars in crypto assets.

== Gallery ==
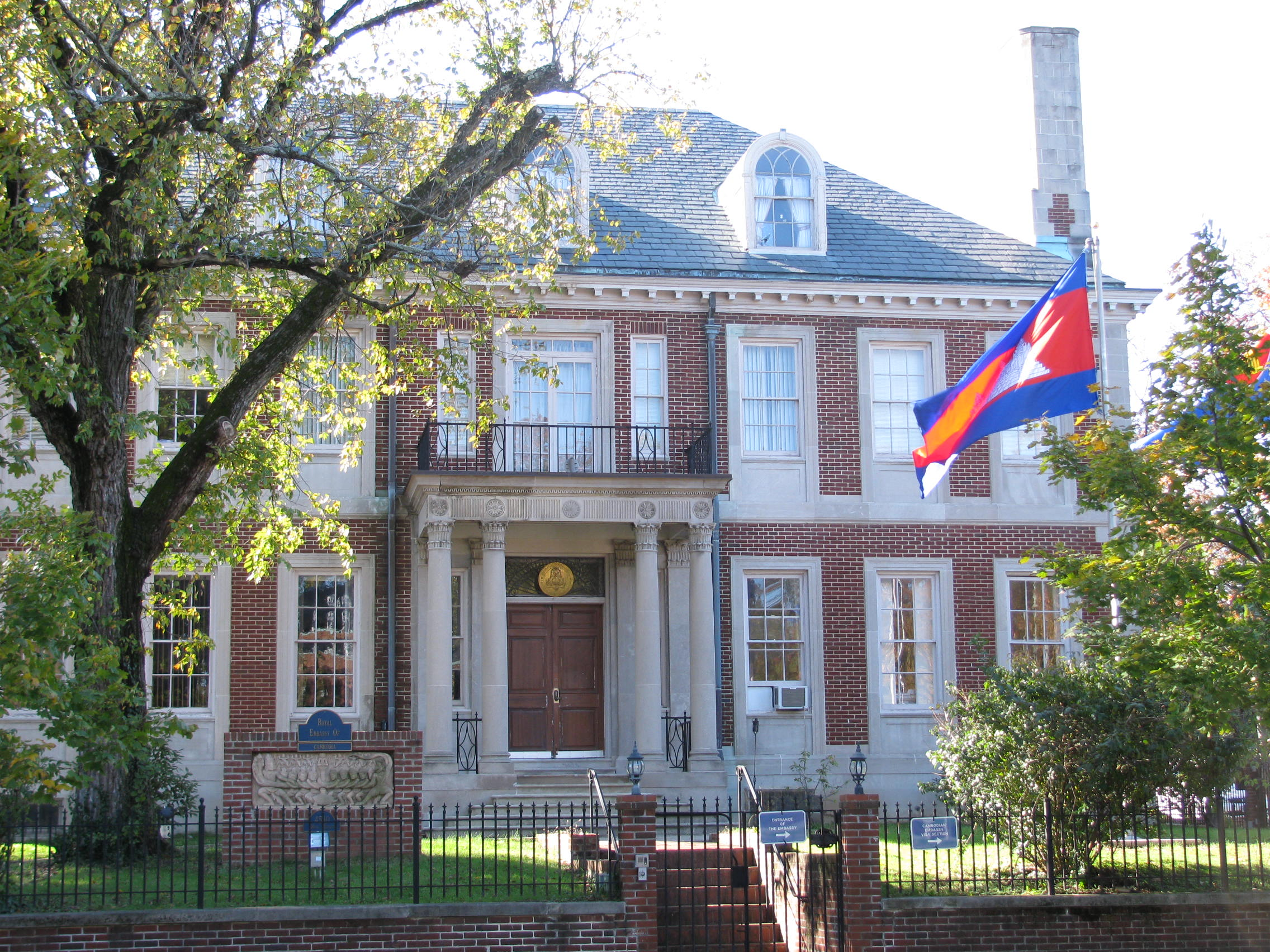
Cambodian embassy in Washington

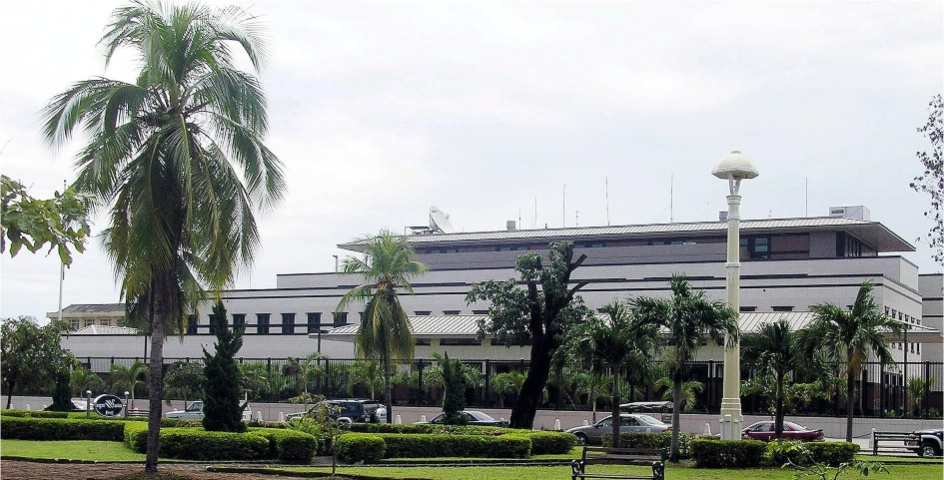
The United States embassy in Phnom Penh

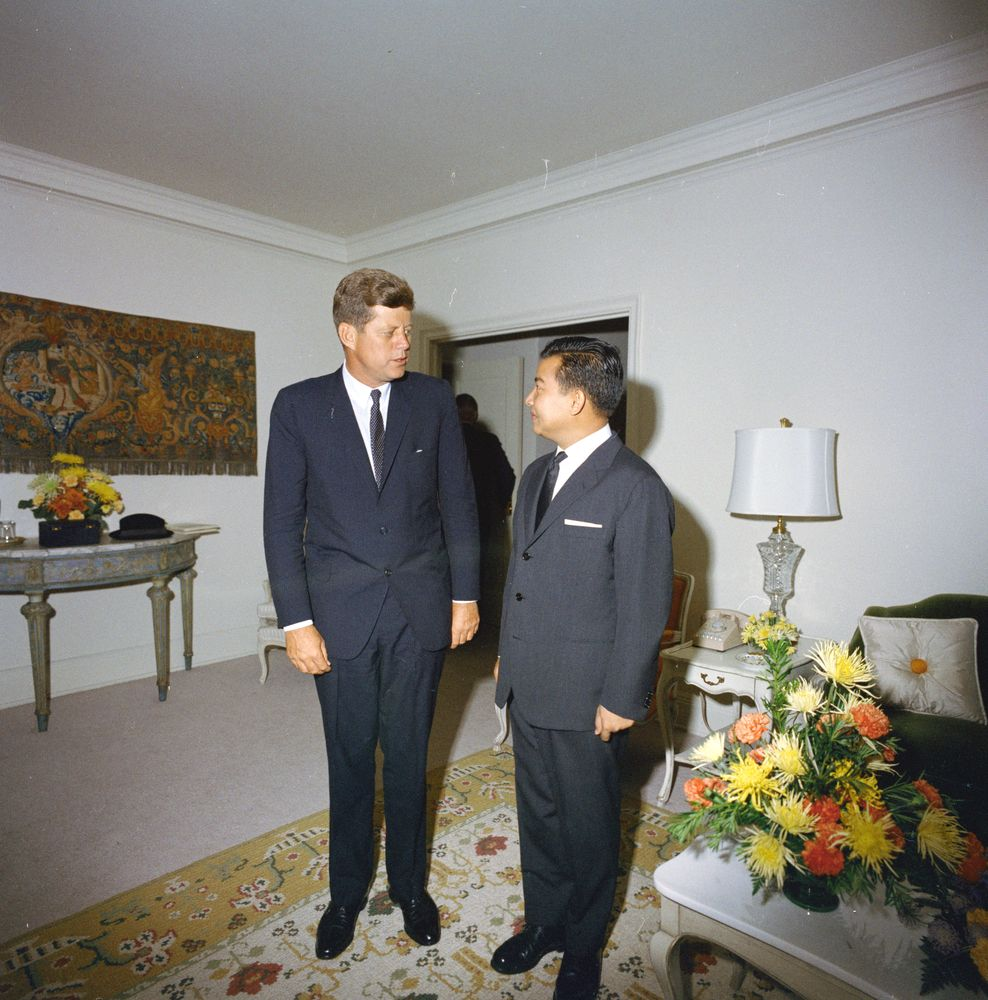
President John F. Kennedy with Prince Norodom Sihanouk in New York City in September 1961

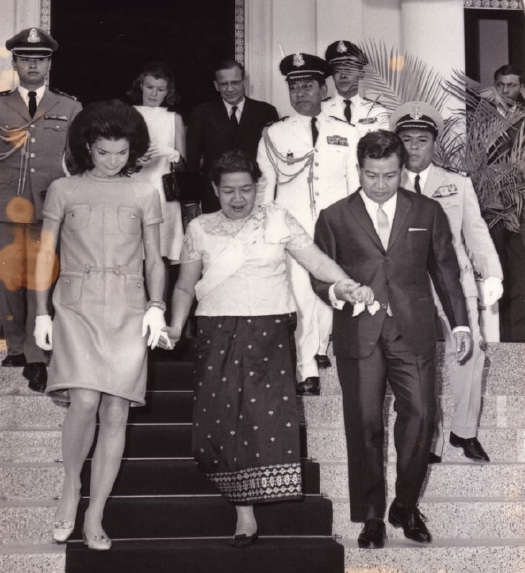
Former First Lady Jacqueline Kennedy with Queen Sisowath Kossamak and Prince Norodom Sihanouk in 1967

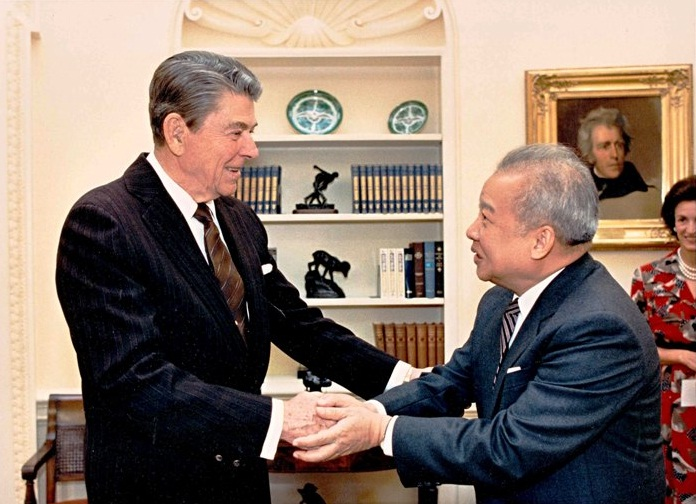
Prince Norodom Sihanouk and President Ronald Reagan in 1988

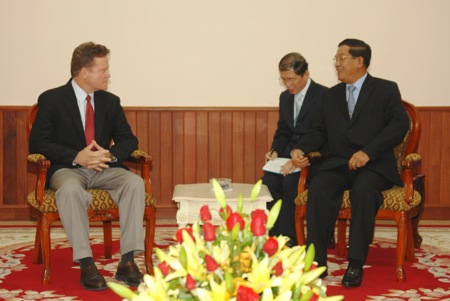
Virginia Senator Jim Webb meeting with Prime Minister Hun Sen on August 19, 2009, in Phnom Penh

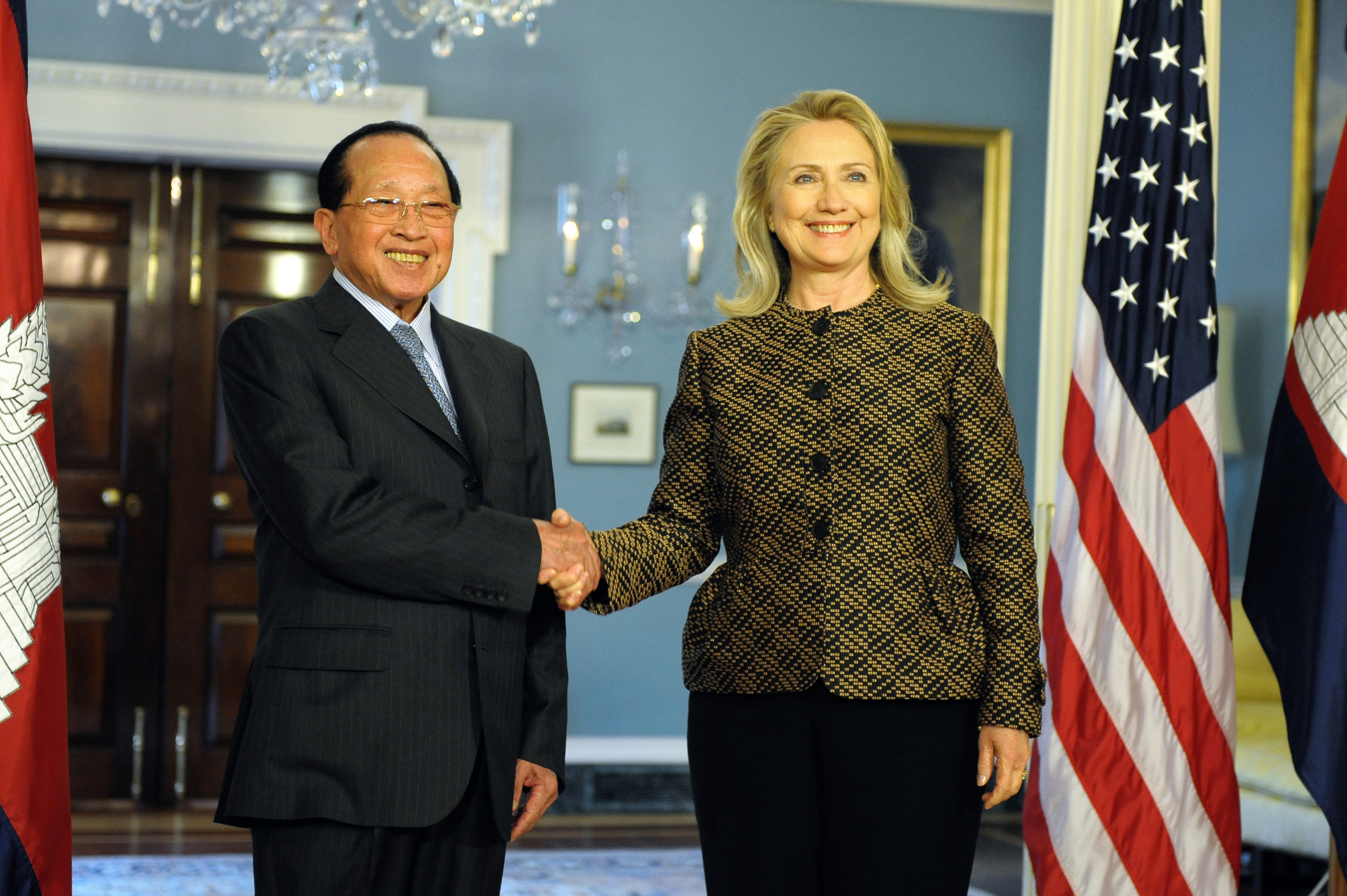
Secretary of State Hillary Clinton with Minister of Foreign Affairs Hor Namhong at the Department of State, Washington, D.C.

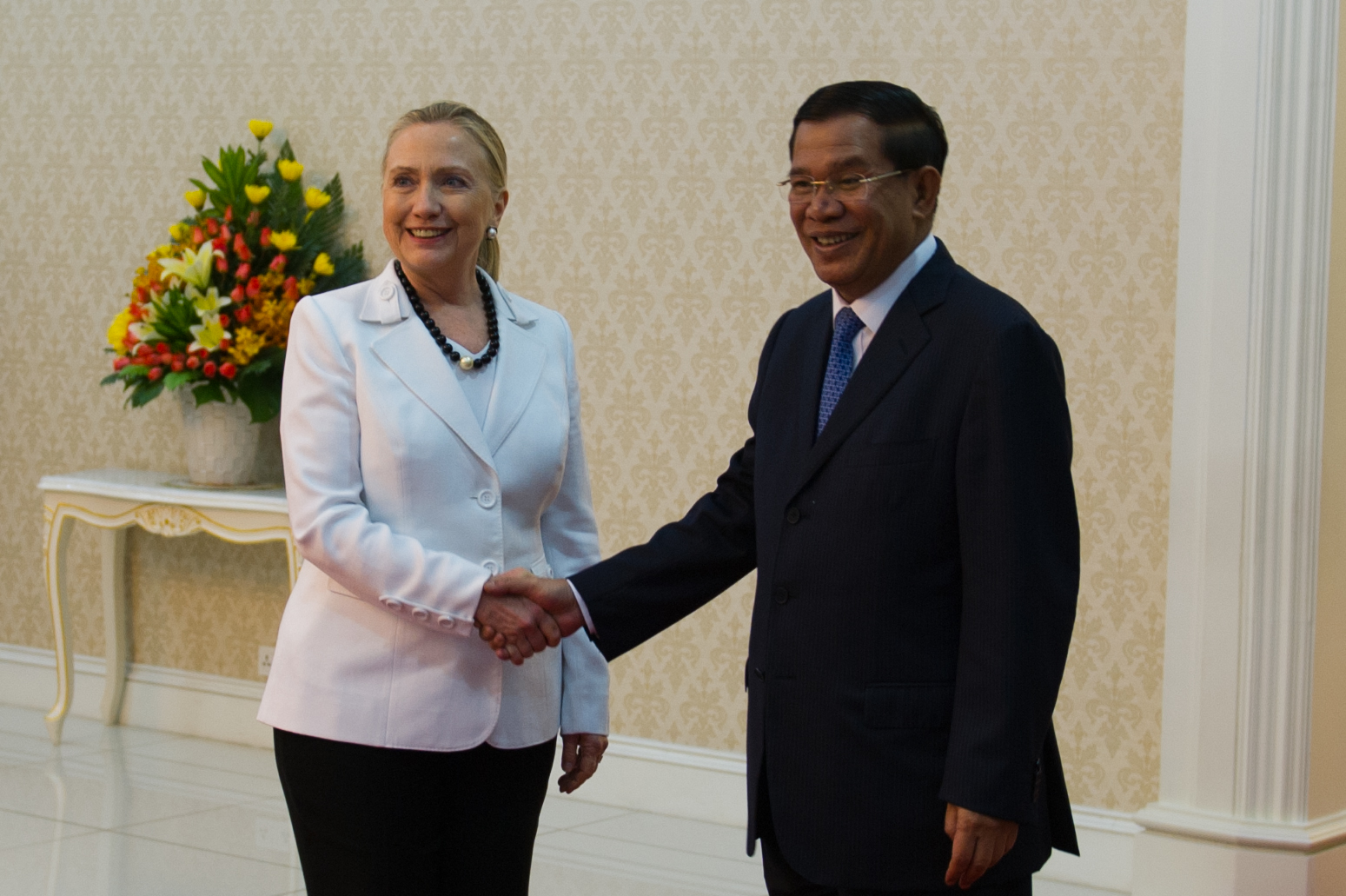
Prime Minister Hun Sen shakes hand with Secretary of State Hillary Clinton before their meeting in Phnom Penh; July 11, 2012.

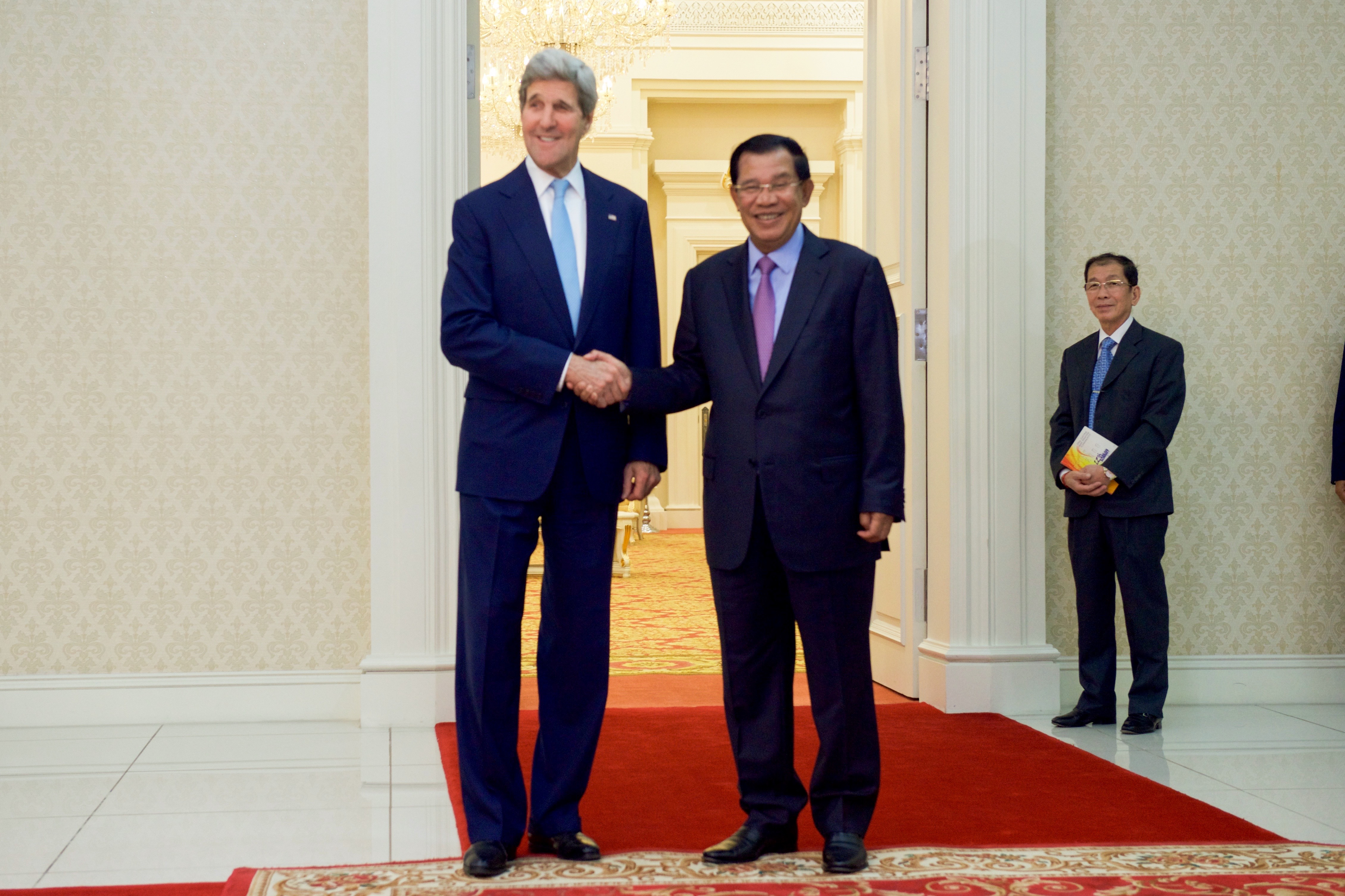
Secretary of State John Kerry with Prime Minister Hun Sen on January 26, 2016

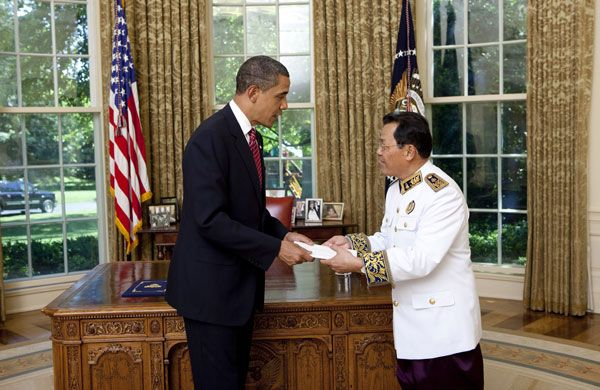
Ambassador Hem Heng presents credentials to President Barack Obama at the White House on May 20, 2009.

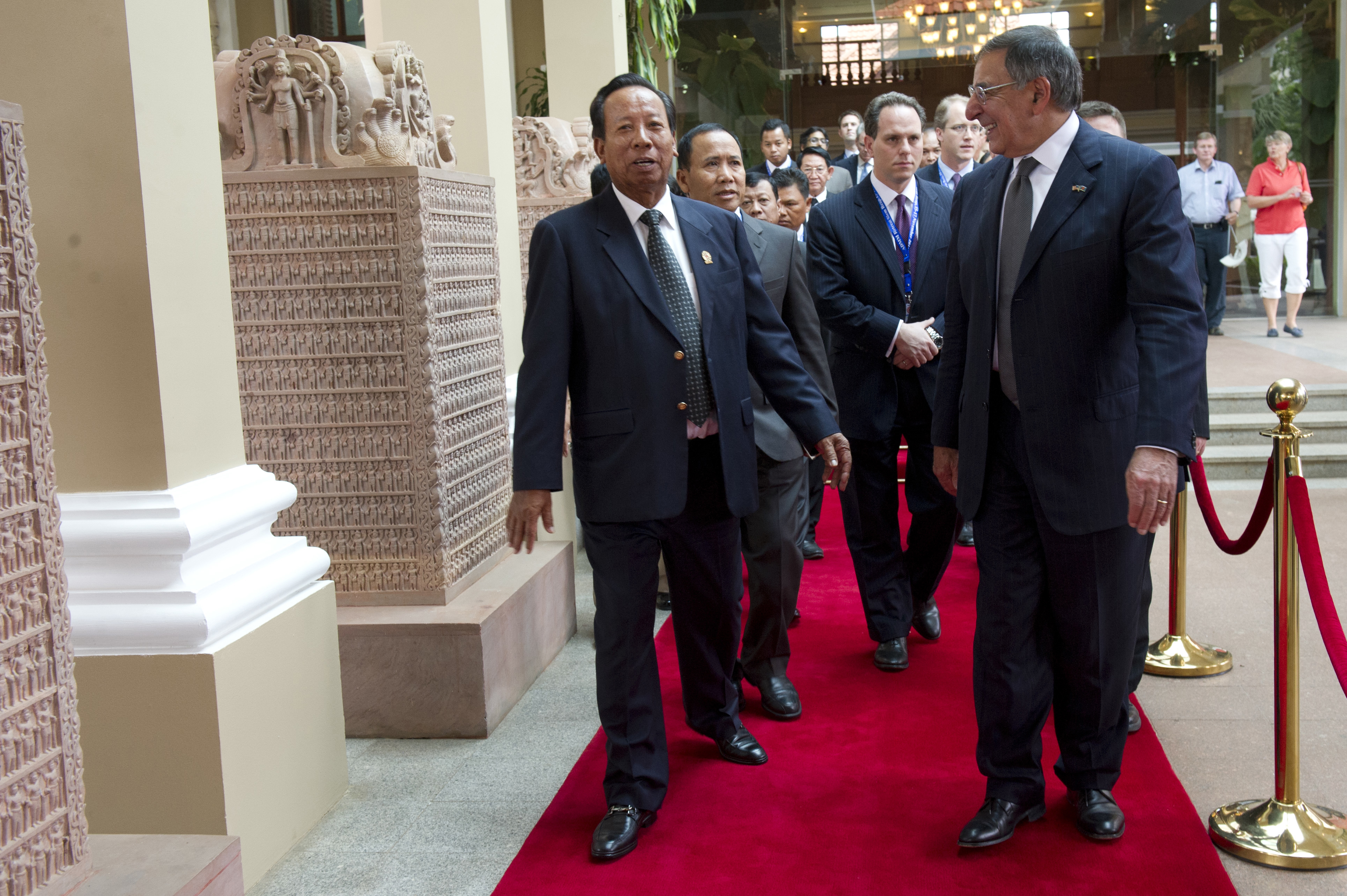
Secretary of Defense Leon E. Panetta walks with Minister for National Defense Tea Banh during a meeting in Siem Reap, Cambodia, in 2012.

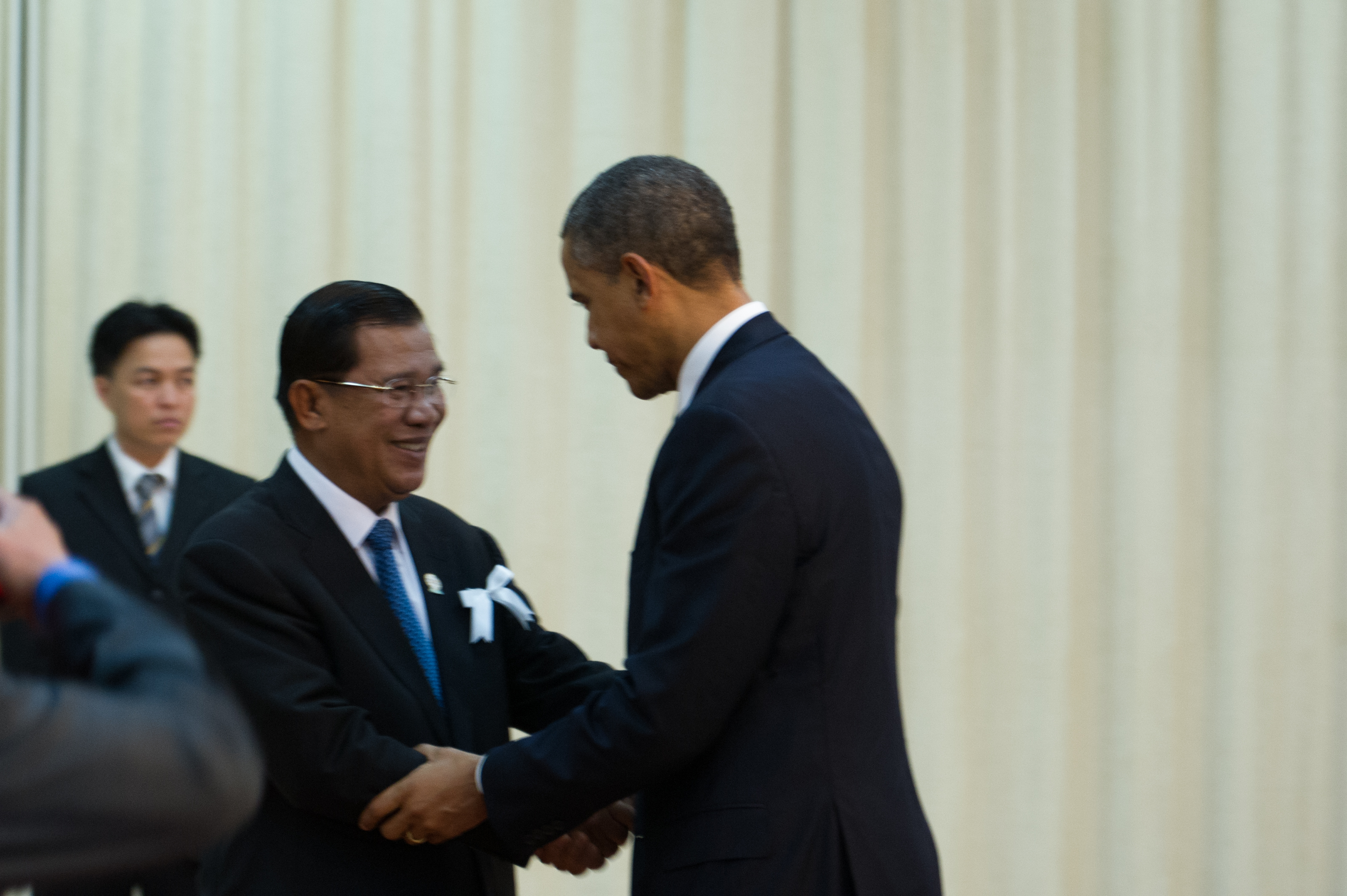
President Barack Obama is welcomed by Prime Minister Hun Sen at the Peace Palace in Phnom Penh, November 19, 2012.

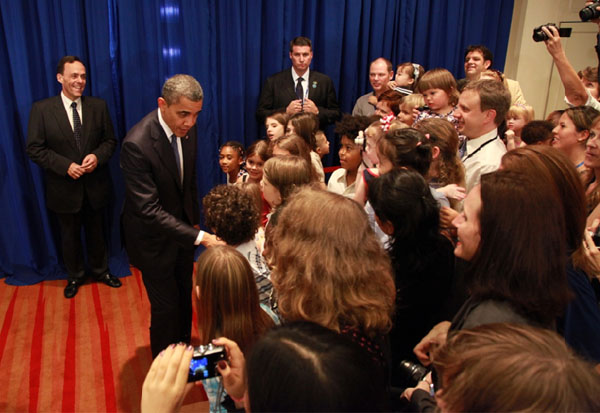
President Barack Obama visits the United States embassy in Phnom Penh.

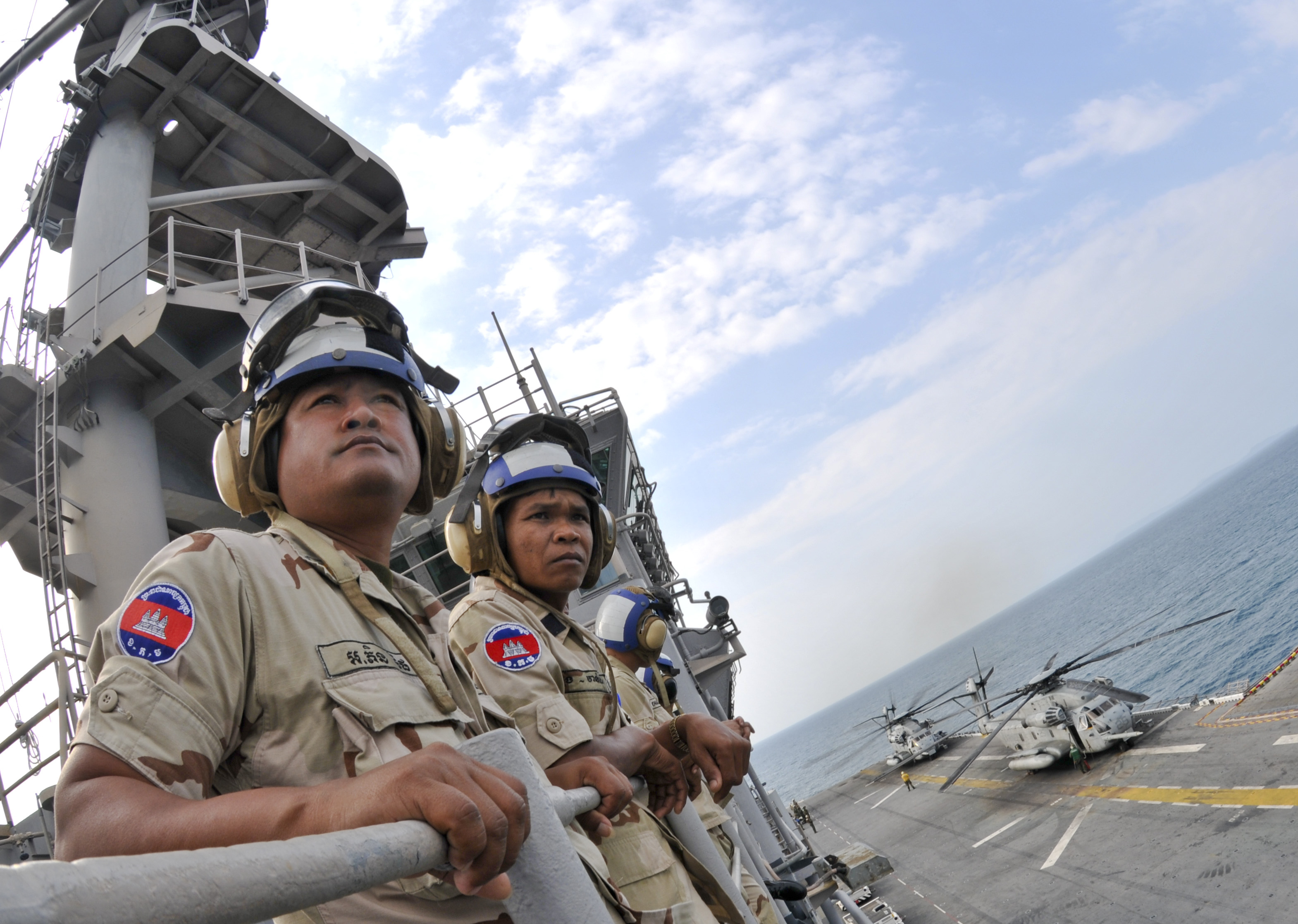
Royal Cambodian Navy officers observe flight quarters during the Cambodia-U.S. Maritime Exercise 2011.

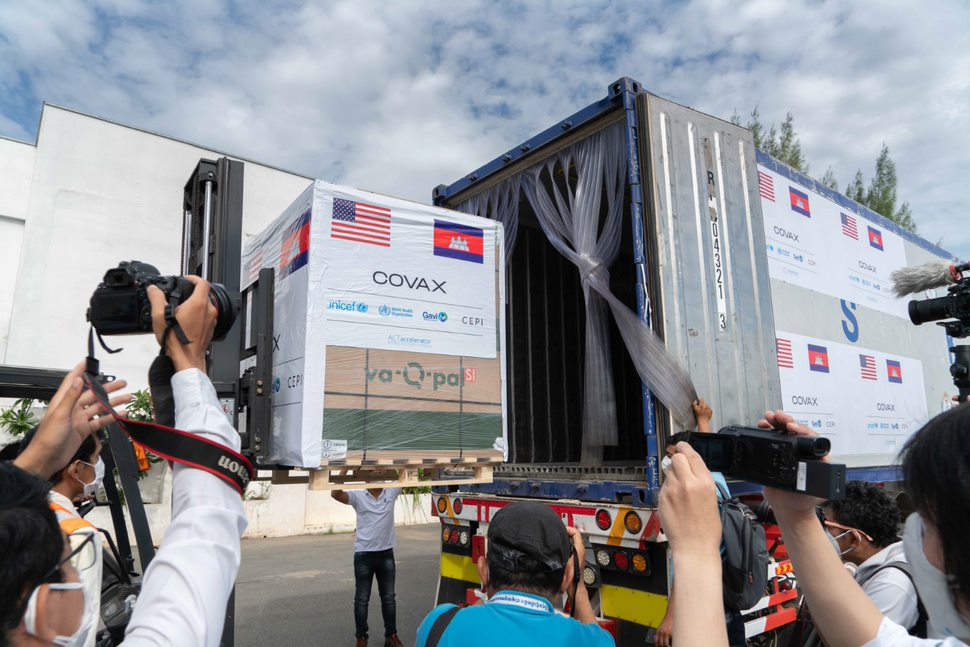
The U.S. delivers Janssen COVID-19 vaccines to Cambodia as part of the COVAX program in 2021.

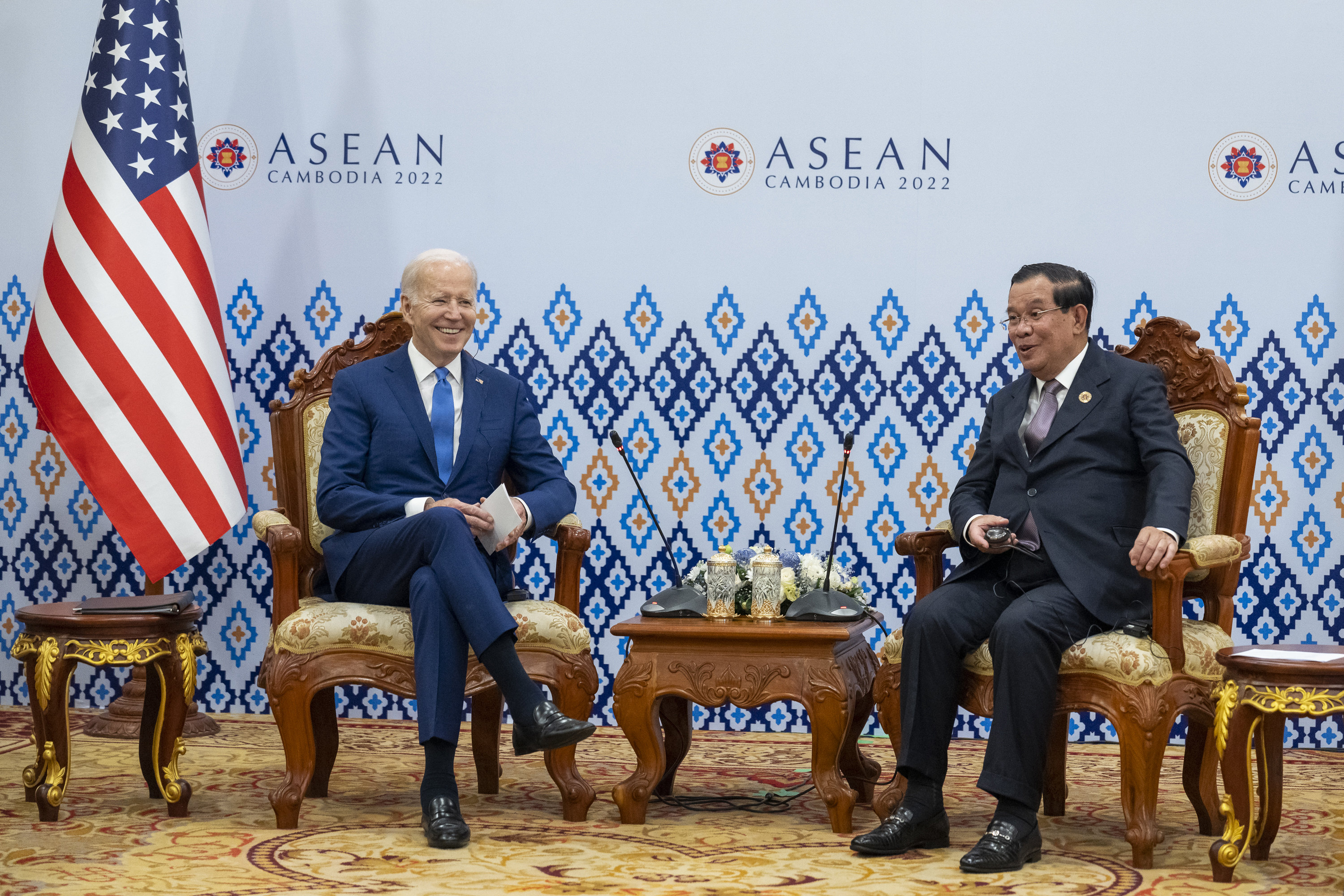
Prime Minister Hun Sen meets with President Joe Biden during the ASEAN Summit in Phnom Penh on November 12, 2022.

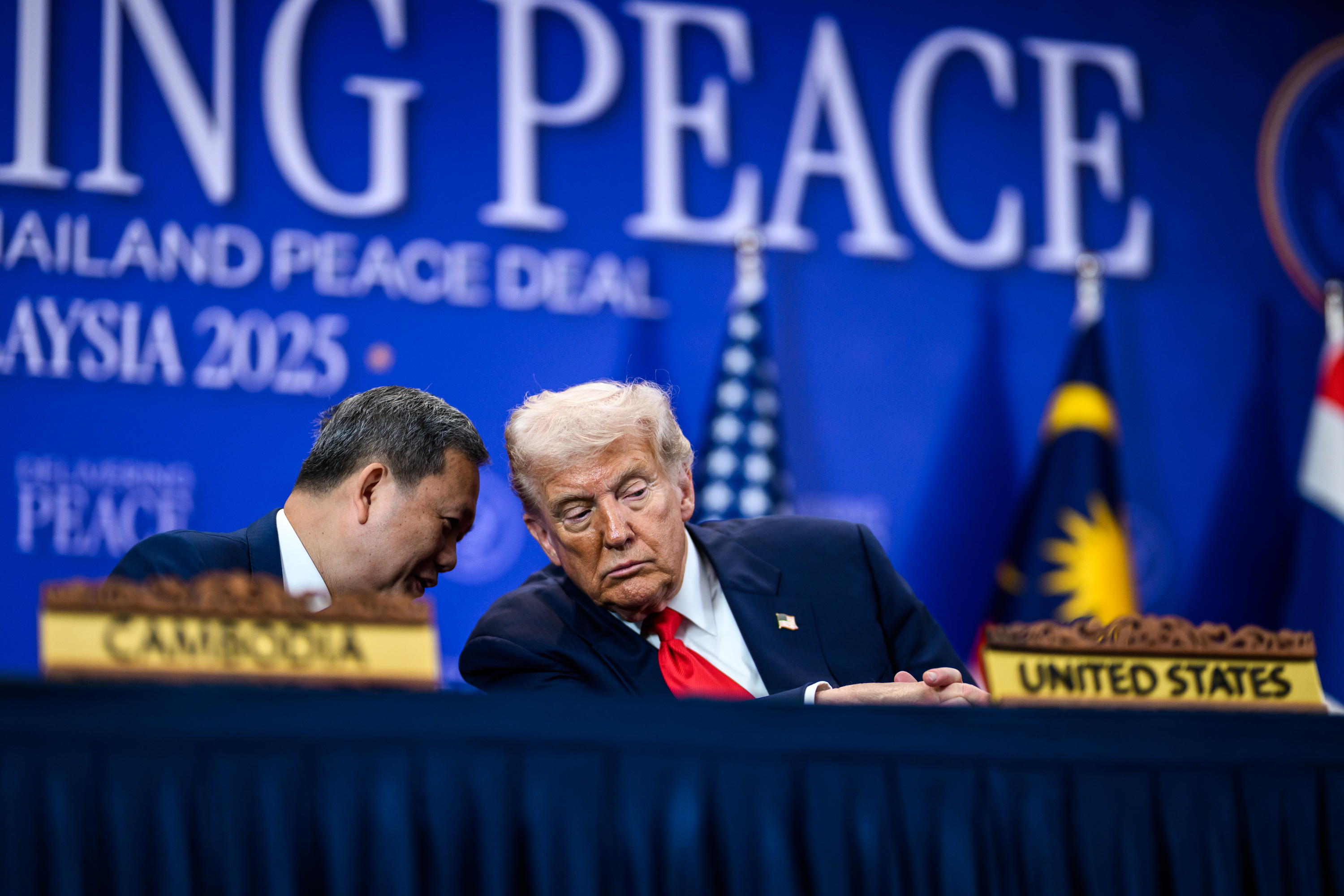
Prime Minister Hun Manet speaks with President Donald Trump prior to the signing of the Kuala Lumpur Peace Accord, 26 October 2025.

== Principal U.S. Officials ==
- Ambassador: W. Patrick Murphy

== Diplomatic missions ==
The U.S. embassy is located in Phnom Penh, near Wat Phnom. It is one of the biggest embassies in Phnom Penh. It is located on the site of the former Cercle Sportif (also known as the Club Sportif Khmer) and following the capture of Phnom Penh by the Khmer Rouge on 17 April 1975 was the scene of the execution of various high-ranking leaders of the Khmer Republic including Lon Non, Long Boret and Sisowath Sirik Matak.

== See also ==
- Cambodian American
- List of Cambodian Americans
- Deportation of Cambodian Americans
- Reagan Doctrine
- CIA activities in Cambodia
