= Susan Thornton =

American diplomat

Susan A. Thornton
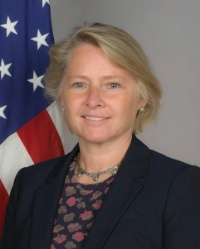

Former Assistant Secretary of State for East Asian and Pacific Affairs
- In office March 9, 2017 – July 2018
- President: Donald Trump
- Preceded by: Daniel Russel
- Succeeded by: W. Patrick Murphy (Acting)

Principal Deputy Assistant Secretary of State for East Asian and Pacific Affairs
- In office February 2016 – July 2018
- Preceded by: Scot Marciel
- Succeeded by: W. Patrick Murphy

Personal details
- Spouse: Michael Joseph Daley
- Education: Johns Hopkins SAIS; Bowdoin College

Susan Ashton Thornton is a former American diplomat. She served as acting Assistant Secretary of State for East Asian and Pacific Affairs during the first Trump administration.

== Biography ==
Prior to joining the State Department, Thornton worked at the Foreign Policy Institute where she studied and wrote about Soviet politics and contemporary Russia. She speaks Russian and Mandarin Chinese. Thornton is a career diplomat who has worked at the State Department since 1991. She has previously served as the Principal Deputy Assistant Secretary for the Bureau of East Asian and Pacific Affairs (EAP) since February 2016 and before that, she worked as the Deputy Chief of Mission to the United States Embassy in Ashgabat, Turkmenistan, Deputy Director of the EAP Office of Chinese and Mongolian Affairs, Economic Unit Chief in the EAP Office of Korean Affairs. Before that she served as First Secretary at the Embassy in Beijing, China, Political/Economic Section Chief at the Consulate General in Chengdu, China, along with other overseas assignment at the Embassy in Yerevan, Armenia and Consulate General in Almaty, Kazakhstan.

She was appointed as acting Assistant Secretary of State for East Asian Affairs on March 9, 2017, and on December 24, she was nominated as the Assistant Secretary of State by President Trump.

Susan Thornton retired in August 2018 after then-Secretary of State Rex Tillerson stepped down. She was never confirmed by the U.S. Senate due to being considered "too soft on China." In particular, US Senator Marco Rubio (R-FL) stated that he would do all he can to prevent Susan Thornton from being confirmed.

She is a board member of the National Committee on U.S.- China Relations.

== Publications ==
=== Articles ===
- On Hong Kong, the United States Must Find Its Voice, Lawfare, August 2, 2019 (co-authored with Ryan Hass)

Political offices
| Preceded by Daniel Russel | Assistant Secretary of State for East Asian and Pacific Affairs; Acting; 2017–2018 | Succeeded by W. Patrick Murphy; Acting |
| Preceded by Scot Marciel | Principal Deputy Assistant Secretary of State for East Asian and Pacific Affairs; 2016–2018 | Succeeded by W. Patrick Murphy |
| Preceded by Kin W. Moy | Deputy Assistant Secretary of State for China, Mongolia and Taiwan; Bureau of East Asian and Pacific Affairs; 2014–2016 | Succeeded by Laura Stone; Acting |
