= Ek Sereywath =

Retired Cambodian ambassador

- ឯក សេរីវឌ្ឍ

Cambodian Ambassador to the Philippines
- In office 1999–2003
- Succeeded by: Hos Sereythonh; Tuot Panha

Cambodian Ambassador to the United States
- In office designated February 10, 2005 accredited: March 8, 2005 – May 20, 2009
- Preceded by: Roland Eng
- Succeeded by: Hem Heng

Personal details
- Born: 1954 (age 71–72) Phnom Penh
- Education: In 1974 Master of Arts in political science from the Sciences Po.: From 1974 to 1975 he studied Southeast Asian affairs at the University of Paris.

Ek Sereywath (born 1954) is a retired Cambodian ambassador.

== Career ==
- In 1970 he left Cambodia and spent the Khmer Rouge years in Paris.
- From 1978 to 1980 he was journalist for Le Figaro.
- From 1983 to 1985 he was editor of a newsletter at the Cambodian center in Paris.
- From 1985 to 1993 he represented the Cambodian royalist party as deputy director and then as director at the FUNCINPEC Information Office.
- In 1993, Ek was elected to the National Assembly of Cambodia where he was five years representative
- For six months in 1993 he was vice minister at the Ministry of Information.
- From 1993 to 1996 he was vice minister at the Ministry of National Defense.

From 1999 to 2003 he was ambassador in Manila (Philippines).

- In 2004, Ek held a seat in the Cambodian Senate.
- On February 10, 2005 he was designated ambassador in Washington, D. C. where he was accredited from March 8, 2005 to May 20, 2009.
