= Kenneth M. Quinn =

American diplomat

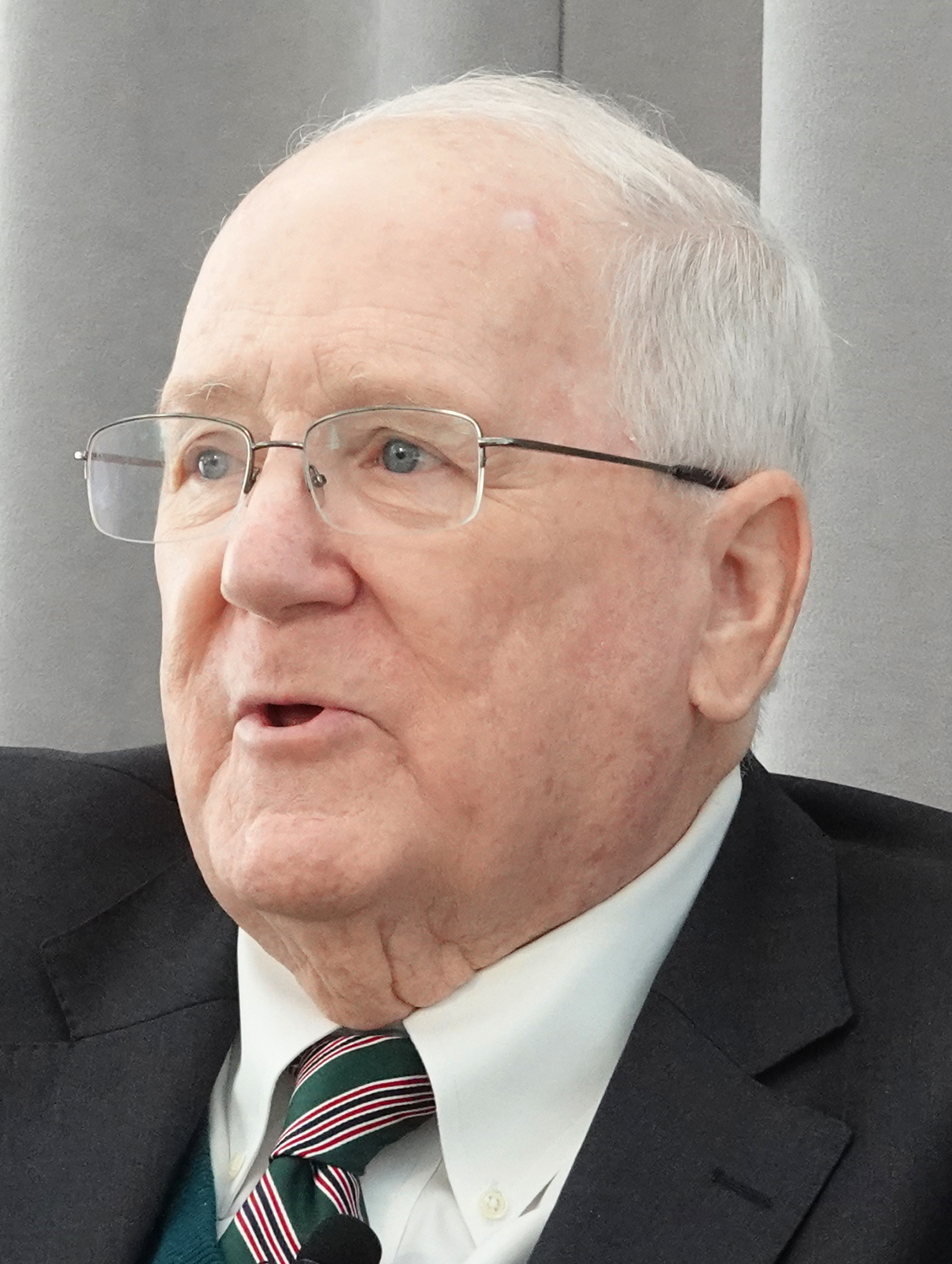

10th United States Ambassador to Cambodia
- In office December 12, 1995 – July 25, 1999
- President: Bill Clinton
- Preceded by: Charles H. Twining
- Succeeded by: Kent M. Wiedemann

Personal details
- Born: May 26, 1942 (age 84) New York, New York, U.S.
- Spouse: Le Son Quinn
- Education: Loras College (B.A.); Marquette University (M.A.); University of Maryland (Ph.D.)
- Profession: Diplomat

Kenneth M. Quinn (born May 26, 1942) is the former President of the World Food Prize Foundation and a former career U.S. Foreign Service Officer. He was the president of the foundation for 20 years from January 1, 2000 to January 3, 2020. Before assuming that role, Quinn spent 32 years working for the U.S. State Department. He has served as the United States Ambassador to Cambodia, Deputy Assistant Secretary of State, as well as a member of the National Security Council staff at the White House.

== Biography ==
Quinn was born in New York City in 1942, and he attended high school in Dubuque, Iowa. Quinn received his undergraduate degree from Loras College in Dubuque, Iowa. He went on to earn graduate degrees in international relations from Marquette University in Milwaukee, Wisconsin and the University of Maryland. He and his wife, Le Son, have three children.

== Diplomatic career ==
Quinn was a 32-year career member of the U.S. Senior Foreign Service before he retired and joined the World Food Prize Foundation. He entered the United States Foreign Service in 1968. During the Vietnam War he served almost six years in Vietnam, first as a USAID Rural Development adviser in the Mekong Delta and later as head of a MACV District Advisory team. He later served elsewhere in Southeast Asia as well as in Vienna and Washington, DC. Quinn is fluent in Vietnamese and acted as interpreter for President Gerald Ford.

=== Awards ===
Quinn has received a number of awards, including the State Department's Award for Heroism and Valor for his work in Cambodia and Vietnam. For his combat operations participation in Vietnam, Quinn received the U.S. Army Air Medal, and he remains the only civilian ever to win this honor. He also is a three-time recipient of the American Foreign Service Association's Rivkin and Herter Awards for courage in challenging policy.

Quinn is also a member of the Chicago Council on Global Affairs.

Diplomatic posts
| Preceded by Charles H. Twining | United States Ambassador to Cambodia; 1996–1999 | Succeeded by Kent M. Wiedemann |
