= William E. Todd =

American diplomat (born 1961)

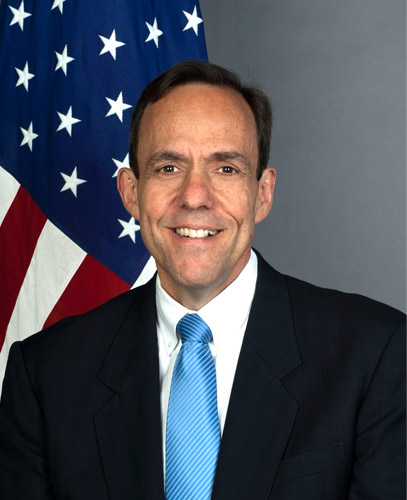

Deputy Under Secretary of State for Management
- In office May 2019 – March 22, 2021
- President: Donald Trump; Joe Biden

Director General of the Foreign Service
- Acting; June 12, 2017 – February 1, 2019
- President: Donald Trump
- Preceded by: Arnold A. Chacón
- Succeeded by: Carol Perez

Assistant Secretary of State for South and Central Asian Affairs
- Acting; January 20, 2017 – June 12, 2017
- President: Donald Trump
- Preceded by: Nisha Desai Biswal
- Succeeded by: Alice Wells (acting)

Principal Deputy Assistant Secretary for South and Central Asian Affairs
- In office August 14, 2015 – May 17, 2019
- President: Barack Obama; Donald Trump; Joe Biden
- Preceded by: Richard Hoagland

United States Ambassador to Cambodia
- In office April 2, 2012 – August 14, 2015
- President: Barack Obama
- Preceded by: Carol A. Rodley
- Succeeded by: William Heidt

United States Ambassador to Brunei
- In office September 15, 2008 – June 6, 2010
- President: George W. Bush; Barack Obama
- Preceded by: Emil Skodon
- Succeeded by: John McIntyre

Personal details
- Born: William Edward Todd; 1961 (age 64–65)
- Spouse: Ann Buckingham
- Children: 4
- Education: Longwood University

William Edward "Bill" Todd (born 1961) was appointed in May 2019 as Deputy Under Secretary for Management. He also served as the Acting Under Secretary of State for Management from February 2018 to May 2019. He retired from the Department of State in May 2021.

== Previous responsibilities ==
Ambassador Todd was the Acting Assistant Secretary for South and Central Asian Affairs from January 2017 and had served as the Principal Deputy Assistant Secretary for the same bureau since August 2015.

President Barack Obama nominated him to be the United States Ambassador to Cambodia on December 1, 2011. Ambassador Todd was confirmed on March 29, 2012 by the U.S. Senate and sworn in on April 17, 2012. He officially became the United States Ambassador to Cambodia when King Norodom Sihamoni accepted his credentials on June 8, 2012. During his time in Cambodia he focused on the advancement of democracy, human rights, regional stability, counterterrorism and trade and investment and directed a very successful large and complex development and assistance program that improved the daily lives of the average Cambodian. He also authored a widely read weekly newspaper column called, "Ask the Ambassador."

Before his appointment to Cambodia, he served as the Coordinating Director of Development and Economic Affairs at the U.S. Embassy in Kabul. While in Afghanistan, he was responsible for all nonmilitary civilian assistance in Afghanistan, including implementation of the largest foreign assistance program and budget in U.S. history. In this capacity he also directed civilian field operations with an American staff of over 600, including 350 civilians embedded with the military in most of Afghanistan's 34 provinces and at five regional Provincial Reconstruction Teams (PRTs).

== Career highlights ==
Ambassador Todd was a career member of the Senior Executive Service for over 20 years.

=== 2008 to 2010 ===
From 2008 to 2010, Ambassador Todd was the U.S. Ambassador to Brunei Darussalam. During his time in Brunei, he focused on regional stability, counterterrorism, democratization, and trade and investment.

=== 2006 to 2008 ===
Prior to serving as Ambassador to Brunei, Ambassador Todd was the Acting Inspector General of the Department of State in 2008 and Deputy Inspector General from 2006 to 2008. In both capacities, he directed all Office of Inspector General activities, domestically and abroad, including at 260 diplomatic missions in 163 countries.

=== 2002 to 2006 ===
From 2002 to 2006, Ambassador Todd served in the Bureau of International Narcotics and Law Enforcement Affairs (INL) at the Department of State. Over this period he served in several INL senior positions, including Principal Deputy Assistant Secretary (PDAS), Deputy Assistant Secretary for International Civilian Police and Rule of Law Programs and for the Office of Asia, Africa, Europe and the Middle East, as well as Executive Director and Controller. As PDAS, he was the Chief Operating Officer for global programs, including all post-conflict activities. His leadership placed him at the forefront of international programs for rule of law, police training, and counternarcotics efforts in some of the most volatile regions of the world, including Iraq, Afghanistan, and Colombia. Ambassador Todd managed more than 4,000 employees and contractors in more than 75 theaters of operation.

== Ambassadorial nomination ==
In February 2020, Todd was nominated to be the next U.S. Ambassador to Pakistan. On January 3, 2021, his nomination was returned to the President under Rule XXXI, Paragraph 6 of the United States Senate. Todd's nomination was opposed by Senator Cory Booker on the floor of the Senate. During Ambassador Todd's hearing, Senator Robert Menendez asked him about "retaliation against career public servants" and demanded that Todd "commit to appear for a transcribed interview regarding political retaliation," which Todd refused to do. Todd responded:

[T]o reduce it to very practical levels, for me to do a voluntary transcribed interview, I am going to have to hire an attorney. That attorney is going to cost $25,000 or $30,000. I am a career employee. You know how much I make. [...] Sir, I have made multiple attempts to meet with your committee. I have offered probably two or three times a month for the last 6 months. I have been unable to get a meeting. [...] That has been my position for 6 months.

== Family life ==
Ambassador Todd is married to Ann Buckingham-Todd and has four children: William, Chris, John, and Caitlyn. He is the son of Jack and Marie Todd. He holds a B.S. from Longwood College and is also a Certified Public Accountant, licensed in the State of Virginia.

Diplomatic posts
Preceded by Emil Skodon	United States Ambassador to Brunei; 2008–2010	Succeeded by John McIntyre
Preceded by Carol Rodley	United States Ambassador to Cambodia; 2012–2015	Succeeded by William Heidt
