= Consulate General of the United States, Osaka =

Coordinates: 34°41′48.6″N 135°30′6.9″E

Consulate-General of the United States in Osaka-Kobe
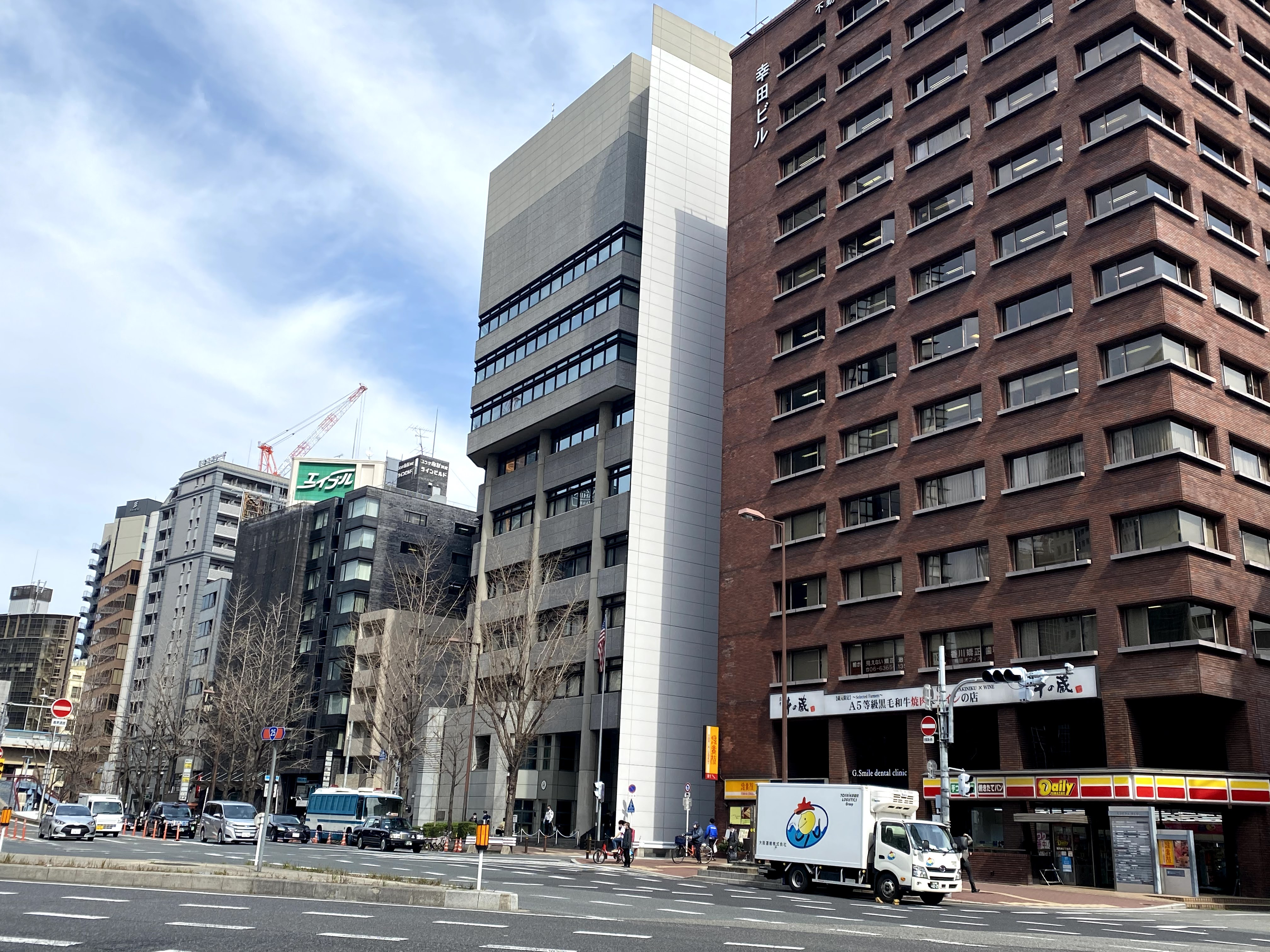
- The U.S. Consulate-General located in Kita-ku, Osaka
- Location: Japan
- Address: 2-11-5, Nishitenma, Kita-ku, Osaka 530-8543
- Jurisdiction: Kansai region (excluding Mie Prefecture), Shikoku region, Chugoku region, Hokuriku region (excluding Niigata Prefecture)
- Consul General: Jason Richard Cubas
- Website: jp.usembassy.gov

The Consulate-General of the United States in Osaka-Kobe (Japanese: 駐大阪・神戸米国総領事館), commonly referred to as the U.S. Consulate-General in Osaka, is a consular post of the United States in Osaka City, Osaka Prefecture, Japan. The inclusion of "Kobe" in the name stems from its previous location in Kobe City, Hyogo Prefecture.

The consulate has a public relations division known as the Kansai American Center.

Its jurisdictional area covers the Hokuriku region (excluding 3 prefectures of Niigata Prefecture), Kansai region (excluding 2 prefectures and 4 cities of Mie Prefecture), Chugoku region (excluding some towns and cities of Yamaguchi Prefecture), and all 4 prefectures of the Shikoku region.

== History ==
In 1867, it was established in Kobe as the U.S. Consulate in Kobe. The consulate in Kobe was closed in 1941 due to the outbreak of the Pacific War between Japan and the U.S. However, it reopened in 1953 after Japan's return to the international community.

In 1961, the Kobe consulate was elevated to the U.S. Consulate-General in Kobe. In 1987, the consulate in Kobe was relocated to Osaka, initiating its operations as the Consulate-General of the United States in Osaka-Kobe.

On January 1, 1985, a bomb-related terrorist incident occurred in Chuo Ward, Kobe. The incident was orchestrated by the Chūkaku-ha, a radical leftist group in Japan. Around 5:57 am, three mortar rounds were fired at the U.S. Consulate in Kobe. Out of the three, two landed within the consulate's premises and one hit a nearby road. Fortunately, no one was harmed. The mortar-launching device was discovered attached to a bench in a nearby park. Following the incident, a man claiming to represent the "Chukaku-ha Revolutionary Army" claimed responsibility for the attack to various media outlets. This act was believed to have been carried out in protest against the strengthening of the Japan-U.S. alliance, as the Prime Minister at the time, Yasuhiro Nakasone, was scheduled to visit the U.S. on the same day.

== Consul general ==
Term	Name	Start date	End date	Notes
	Ralph J. Blake	June 1952		
	William C. Sherman	1968	1970	
	William H. Bruns			Records show service in 1975 and 1977
	Robert Ludan		2002	
	Alexander Almazov	2002	2005	
	Daniel R. Russel	August 2005	August 2008	
	Edward K.H. Dong	September 2008	2011	
	Patrick Joseph Linehan	August 2011	July 2014	Head of the Kansai Consular Corps
	Allen S. Greenberg	August 2014	2017	
	Karen Kelley	August 2017	July 2020	
	Colin Fishwick	July 2020	September 2020	Acting Consul General
	Richard Mei Jr.	September 2020	2023	
	Jason Richard Cubas	2023	(Incumbent)	

== See also ==
- Japan–United States relations
- Embassy of the United States, Tokyo
