= Emil Skodon =

American diplomat (born 1953)

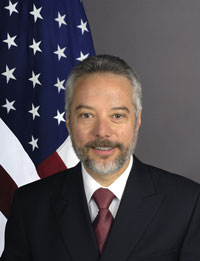
Emil Skodon

Emil Skodon (born November 25, 1953, in Chicago, Illinois) is a former United States diplomat and a career foreign service officer. He was the U.S. ambassador to Brunei until August 1, 2008. He was sworn in as ambassador on September 7, 2005, and presented his credentials to the Sultan of Brunei on November 1. A career diplomat and Minister Counselor in the Senior United States Foreign Service, Skodon had previously been Deputy Chief of Mission at the American Embassy in Rome, Italy, since August 2002. He retired from the Foreign Service following his service in Brunei and is currently an independent consultant living in Washington, DC.

Skodon is one of the few U.S. officials to have personally experienced both the Iraqi attack on Kuwait in 1990 and the Al-Qaeda terrorist attack on Washington in 2001. Prior to his Rome assignment, Skodon was detailed to the U.S. Air Force as Foreign Policy Advisor to the USAF Chief of Staff. He was in the Pentagon during the September 11, 2001 attacks, and afterwards helped coordinate the diplomatic and military response. Skodon was Counselor for Economic Affairs at the American Embassy in Kuwait from 1989 to 1991, and was in Kuwait when Iraq invaded in August 1990. After Iraqi authorities reneged on their promise of safe passage for an evacuation convoy led by Skodon and prevented U.S. diplomats from leaving Iraq, he served as Acting Deputy Chief of Mission at the U.S. Embassy in Baghdad. In his book "The Politics of Truth," Ambassador Joseph Wilson, who was the U.S. Chargé d'Affaires in Baghdad at the time, described Skodon as "the one indispensable person in our operation, the perfect Mr. Inside to my Mr. Outside." Skodon departed Iraq in December 1990 after U.S. hostages were released.

Skodon also served as Director of the State Department Office of Australian, New Zealand, and Pacific Island Affairs from 1998 to 2000, Deputy Chief of Mission at the American Embassy in Singapore from 1995 to 1998, and United States Consul General in Perth, Australia from 1991 to 1995. He was also assigned to the economic sections of U.S. embassies in Vienna (1984–88) and East Berlin (1979–81). He served in the State Department Office of Southern African Affairs (1982–84) and at the U.S. Embassy in Bridgetown, Barbados (1977–78). He has received several State Department Superior Honor and Meritorious Honor awards. He was awarded the Outstanding Civilian Service Award by the U.S. Army in recognition of his work as Deputy Chief of Mission in Rome, and the Decoration for Exceptional Civilian Service by the U.S. Air Force for his contributions to Air Force operations during Operation Enduring Freedom.

He holds BA and MBA degrees from the University of Chicago, and has studied German, Arabic, and Italian at the Foreign Service Institute. He is a member of the National Trust for Historic Preservation, the Washington Institute for Foreign Affairs, the Asia Society, and the Chaine des Rotisseurs. He is married and has two daughters.

Diplomatic posts
Preceded by Gene B. Christy	United States Ambassador to Brunei; 2005–2008	Succeeded by William E. Todd
