= John Gunther Dean =

American diplomat (1926–2019)

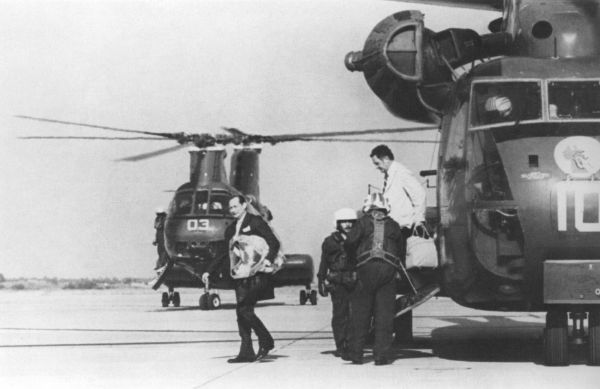
- Ambassador Dean arriving in Thailand, 1975

United States Ambassador to India
- In office September 6, 1985 – November 7, 1988
- President: Ronald Reagan
- Preceded by: Harry G. Barnes, Jr.
- Succeeded by: John R. Hubbard

United States Ambassador to Thailand
- In office October 26, 1981 – June 6, 1985
- President: Ronald Reagan
- Preceded by: Morton I. Abramowitz
- Succeeded by: William Andreas Brown

United States Ambassador to Lebanon
- In office October 10, 1978 – June 23, 1981
- President: Jimmy Carter; Ronald Reagan
- Preceded by: Richard Bordeaux Parker
- Succeeded by: Robert Sherwood Dillon

United States Ambassador to Denmark
- In office November 6, 1975 – July 18, 1978
- President: Gerald Ford; Jimmy Carter
- Preceded by: Philip K. Crowe
- Succeeded by: Warren Demian Manshel

United States Ambassador to the Khmer Republic
- In office April 3, 1974 – April 12, 1975
- President: Richard Nixon; Gerald Ford
- Preceded by: Emory C. Swank
- Succeeded by: Position abolished

Personal details
- Born: Gunther Dienstfertig; February 24, 1926 Breslau, Germany
- Died: June 6, 2019 (aged 93) Paris, France
- Spouse: Martine Duphenieux
- Children: 3
- Education: Harvard University (B.S., M.A.); University of Paris (J.D.)
- Profession: Diplomat

John Gunther Dean (born Gunther Dienstfertig; February 24, 1926 – June 6, 2019) was an American diplomat. From 1974 to 1988, he served as the United States ambassador to five nations under four American presidents. He is also notable for surviving an assassination attempt likely perpetrated by Israel.

== Early life ==
Dean was born as Gunther Dienstfertig in Breslau, Germany, into a Jewish family, the son of Lucy (Askenazy) and prominent lawyer Joseph Dienstfertig. As a child, he attended the exclusive Von Zawatzki Schule in Breslau. Escaping the rise of Nazism, the family left Germany in December 1938 and arrived in the United States in February. His original first name was Gunther; however, an immigration officer expanded it to John Gunther, to avoid it sounding “too German.” In March 1939, the family changed its surname from Dienstfertig to Dean at the City Court of New York, to better integrate into their neighborhood in Queens. They eventually arrived in Kansas City, Missouri, where his father briefly lectured at the University of Kansas.

== Education ==
Graduating from high school in Kansas City at the age of 16, he went on to Harvard University. Dean interrupted his education 1944 to serve in the United States Army. In 1946, he then returned to Harvard and obtained his undergraduate degree (B.S. Magna Cum Laude, 1947). He received his doctorate in law from the Sorbonne (1949), and returned to Harvard again to obtain a graduate degree in international relations (M.A., 1950).

== Career before the Foreign Service ==
In 1944, Dean became a naturalized United States citizen. He interrupted his education and served in the United States Army from 1944 to 1946, utilizing his language skills with the Office of Military Intelligence. Dean was trained at Fort Belvoir, after which he was sent to a top-secret intelligence site named Post Office Box 1142. There, he helped American authorities debrief scientists from Nazi Germany. After he left he was offered a job in the newly formed Central Intelligence Agency, which he refused on advice from his father.

In 1950 Dean worked in government service as an economic analyst with the European Headquarters of the Economic Cooperation Administration in Paris, France. From 1951 to 1953 he was an industrial analyst with ECA in Brussels, Belgium. From 1953 to 1956 he was assistant economic commissioner with the International Cooperation Administration in French Indo-China with accreditation in Saigon, Phnom Penh, and Vientiane.

== Diplomatic career ==
Dean passed the Foreign Service Examination in 1954. He formally began his service as an officer with the U.S. Department of State in the spring of 1956. From 1956 to 1958 he served as a political officer in Vientiane, Laos, and then from 1959 to 1960 he opened the first American consulate in Lomé, Togo. From 1960 to 1961 he was Chargé d'affaires in Bamako, Mali where he again opened the first American consulate. He then became the officer in charge of Mali-Togo affairs in the Department of State from 1961 to 1963. Dean was awarded a Meritorious Service Award from the Department for his work there in 1963. Also in 1963 Dean was an adviser to the U.S. delegation to the 18th Session of the United Nations General Assembly, and during 1964–1965 he was an international relations officer in the NATO section of the Department of State. Dean went to Paris in 1965 as a political officer and served there until 1969. From 1969 to 1970 he was a fellow at Harvard's Center for International Affairs in Cambridge, Massachusetts.

He was then detailed to the U.S. military as Deputy to the Commander of Military Region 1 in South Vietnam where he served as Regional Director for Civil Operations and Revolutionary Development Support (CORDS) until 1972. While in Da Nang, South Vietnam, he helped to protect the Cham Museum for which he was officially thanked in 2005 by the Vietnamese and French authorities. From 1972 to 1974 he was the deputy chief of mission/Chargé d'affaires in Vientiane, Laos. He is credited for having helped the establishment of a coalition government which saved thousands of lives after the Fall of Saigon in 1975. Dean was appointed Ambassador to Cambodia in March 1974 and served until all American personnel were evacuated on April 12, 1975.

In August 1980, while serving as ambassador to Lebanon, Dean was the target of an assassination attempt, which, evidence dictated, was directed by Israel. According to him:

Weapons financed and given by the United States to Israel were used in an attempt to kill an American diplomat! Undoubtedly using a proxy, our ally Israel had tried to kill me.

Dean's suspicions that Israeli agents may have also been involved in the mysterious aircraft crash in 1988 that killed Muhammad Zia-ul-Haq, the president of Pakistan, led to a decision in Washington to declare him mentally unfit, which forced his resignation from the foreign service after a thirty-year career. Later he was rehabilitated by the State Department, given a distinguished service medal and the insanity charge was confirmed to be phony by a former head of the department's medical service.

Dean retired from the U.S. Foreign Service in 1989. Dean's freelancing efforts to get the Reagan Administration to reverse its policies on Afghanistan, Pakistan, and India angered high administration officials, and he left government service soon thereafter.

== Personal life ==
Dean spoke four languages: English, French, German, and Danish. He was the first U.S. Ambassador to Denmark who learned and spoke Danish, thus gaining significant respect from its people. He was married to the French-born Martine Duphenieux, and they had three grown children. He lived in Switzerland and France but remained active on foreign affairs issues and went to the United States often. He died in June 2019 at the age of 93.

While stationed in Paris (1965–69), Dean played a major role in bringing the U.S.-North Vietnam peace talks to Paris in 1968. In Lebanon, Dean was helpful in obtaining the release of the first American hostages in Tehran. In India, Dean helped bring about the withdrawal of Soviet troops from Afghanistan according to an agreed time table.

In the film The Killing Fields, Dean is portrayed by Ira Wheeler. The evacuation of Phnom Penh scene was filmed near Bangkok in 1983 and Wheeler met Dean, who was then the U.S. Ambassador to Thailand.

== Bibliography ==
Book published 2009 DANGER ZONES: A Diplomat's Fight for America's Interests, published by the Association for Diplomatic Studies and Training.

Diplomatic posts
| Preceded by Emory C. Swank | United States Ambassador to the Khmer Republic; 1974 – 1975 | Succeeded by None (Diplomatic ties temporarily severed in 1975) |
| Preceded by Philip K. Crowe | United States Ambassador to Denmark; 1975 – 1978 | Succeeded by Warren Demian Manshel |
| Preceded by Richard B. Parker | United States Ambassador to Lebanon; 1978 – 1981 | Succeeded by Robert Sherwood Dillon |
| Preceded by Morton I. Abramowitz | United States Ambassador to The Kingdom of Thailand; 1981 – 1985 | Succeeded by William Andreas Brown |
| Preceded by Harry G. Barnes, Jr. | United States Ambassador to India; 1985 – 1988 | Succeeded by John Randolph Hubbard |
