= Warren D. Manshel =

American diplomat (1924–1990)

Warren Demian Manshel (January 6, 1924 – February 25, 1990) was an investment banker; an editor and publisher; and a diplomat.

== Early life, education and career ==
Warren Manshel was born in France and immigrated to the United States from Germany with his family prior to World War II. He enlisted in and served in the U.S. Army during World War II, ultimately licensing several Allied-influenced newspapers and a new German news agency. Following World War II, Manshel enrolled at Harvard University, where he earned his bachelor's, master's and doctoral degrees in government. As a teaching fellow at Harvard, he shared an office and friendship with Henry Kissinger, later to receive the Nobel Peace Prize as U.S. Secretary of State. Upon earning his doctorate, Manshel was awarded Harvard's prestigious 1952 Chase Prize in International Relations for the "most publishable document advancing peace" for his preemptive, scholarly work on the unification of post-war Europe.

Shortly after Harvard, Manshel became director and chief administrative officer at the Council for Cultural Freedom, an anti-Communist organization of American and European intellectuals (1954-1955). He then joined Coleman & Company in New York in 1955, eventually becoming its managing partner and director of institutional research; and retired from the firm in 1977. An expert investment banker, Manshel also co-founded the European Options Exchange in Belgium in 1978, now a unit of Euronext. He also was a member of the Board of Overseers at Harvard University. Following his diplomatic service in 1981, Manshel served as a member of the board of directors for a Dreyfus Funds company.

== The Public Interest and Foreign Policy magazines ==
Manshel, a neo-liberal, continued to cultivate his influential role as a social, political and international relations intellectual throughout the 1960s and 1970s. In 1965, he co-founded and published The Public Interest magazine with Irving Kristol. During Warren Manshel's tenure as its publisher, The Public Interest gave voice to leading and emerging intellectuals, including Seymour Martin Lipset, Peter Drucker, Leon Kass, Daniel Patrick Moynihan and Francis Fukuyama.

In 1970, Manshel launched the influential Foreign Policy magazine with his friend Samuel P. Huntington, later the author of Clash of the Civilizations, and in conjunction with Carnegie Endowment for International Peace. Manshel hired Richard Holbrooke as the first managing editor for Foreign Policy - later to become a U.S. Assistant Secretary of State, U.S. Ambassador to Germany, U.S. Ambassador to the United Nations, peace negotiator for the Dayton Accords, and U.S. Presidential Envoy to the Middle East. Manshel served as editor and publisher of Foreign Policy until his death in 1990. Under his direction, Foreign Policy gave voice to intellectuals in academia, finance, politics and government. Foreign Policy is now owned by The Slate Group, a business unit of The Washington Post Company.

== Political advisor, diplomat ==
A member of the Council on Foreign Relations, and an expert in social, economic and political affairs, and international relations, Manshel was tapped to serve as confidante to prominent national political figures in the United States including Senator Daniel Patrick Moynihan (D-NY); Senator and presidential candidate Eugene McCarthy (D-MN); Senator and presidential candidate Frank Church (D-ID); and Vice President and Democratic Nominee for President Walter Mondale (D-MN). In recognition of his body of work, President Jimmy Carter appointed Warren Demian Manshel as U.S. Ambassador to Denmark, a position he held with distinction from 1978 to 1981.

== Manshel Lecture on American Foreign Policy, Harvard University ==
To underscore the importance that Ambassador Warren Demian Manshel and his wife and partner Anita Coleman placed on social and political justice, and international relations, friends and family endowed the Warren and Anita Manshel Lecture on American Foreign Policy at the Weatherhead Center for International Affairs (WCFIA) at Harvard University. To date, Manshel Lecturer and honorees have included:

- Irving Kristol, co-founder, The Public Interest, The National Interest
- Senator Daniel Patrick Moynihan (D-New York)
- Anthony Lake, Assistant to the President for National Security Affairs
- Ambassador Richard C. Holbrooke, former Assistant Secretary of State
- Jorge Castañeda, former Secretary of Foreign Relations of Mexico
- Richard W. Fisher, President, Federal Reserve Bank of Dallas
- The Most Reverend Desmond Tutu, Archbishop, Nobel Laureate for Peace
- Baroness Shirley Williams, Privy Councillor; Liberal Democrats, House of Lords
- Seymour Hersh, Investigative Journalist, The New Yorker

== Sources ==
- United States Department of State: Ambassadors to Denmark
- The Political Graveyard: Warren Demian Manshel

Diplomatic posts
Preceded by John Gunther Dean	U.S. Ambassador to Denmark; 1978-1981	Succeeded by John Langeloth Loeb, Jr.
