= List of ambassadors of Cambodia to the United States =

Coordinates: 38.94592°N 77.03679°W

Ambassador of Cambodia to the United States
- ឯកអគ្គរាជទូតខ្មែរប្រចាំនៅសហរដ្ឋអាមេរិក
- Royal Arms of Cambodia
- Incumbent; Chum Sounry since June 2018
- Style: His Excellency
- Residence: Washington, D.C.
- Nominator: Prime Minister
- Appointer: HM The King
- Term length: No fixed term
- Inaugural holder: Nong Kimny
- Formation: 20 June 1951; 75 years ago
- Website: Royal Embassy of Cambodia - Washington, D.C.

The Cambodian ambassador to the United States is the official representative of the government of Cambodia in Phnom Penh to the government of the United States in Washington, D.C.

== List of representatives ==
Diplomatic agrément	Diplomatic accreditation	Ambassador	Observations	Head of state	President
June 5, 1951			LEGATION OPENED	Norodom Sihanouk	Harry S. Truman
June 5, 1951	June 20, 1951	Nong Kimny		Norodom Sihanouk	Harry S. Truman
July 1, 1952			LEGATION RAISED TO EMBASSY	Norodom Sihanouk	Harry S. Truman
June 19, 1952	July 1, 1952	Nong Kimny		Norodom Sihanouk	Harry S. Truman
June 8, 1970	June 11, 1970	Sonn Voeunsai	He was director general of the Royal Railways of Cambodia. In May 1965, the Cambodian Government asked for agreement for their newly appointed Ambassador in Paris, Mr Sonn Voeunsai, to be accredited also in London. (accredited 26 Nov. 1965; resident in Paris)	Cheng Heng	Richard Nixon
August 1, 1970			Name changed from Cambodia to KHMER REPUBLIC	Cheng Heng	Richard Nixon
June 5, 1973	June 14, 1973	Um Sim		Lon Nol	Richard Nixon
August 30, 1975			EMBASSY CLOSED	Norodom Sihanouk	Gerald Ford
May 28, 1995	September 15, 1995	Houth Var		Norodom Sihanouk	Bill Clinton
September 14, 1999	November 29, 1999	Roland Eng	(* 1947) In 1996 he was Ambassador to Thailand.	Norodom Sihanouk	Bill Clinton
February 10, 2005	March 8, 2005	Ek Sereywath		Norodom Sihamoni	George W. Bush
January 29, 2009	May 20, 2009	Hem Heng		Norodom Sihamoni	Barack Obama
June 25, 2015	August 2, 2015	Chum Bunrong		Norodom Sihamoni	Barack Obama
June 25, 2015	August 2, 2015	Chum Bunrong		Norodom Sihamoni	Donald Trump
June 2018	September 17, 2018	Chum Sounry		Norodom Sihamoni	Donald Trump

- Cambodia–United States relations
