= Foreign Policy =

American news magazine and website

- Cover of the Summer 2023 issue
- Editor: Ravi Agrawal
- Categories: News magazine, news site
- Frequency: Four issues annually
- Format: Digital | Print
- Total circulation: 35,000 (December 2021)
- Founder: Samuel P. Huntington; Warren Demian Manshel
- Founded: December 1970; 55 years ago
- Company: Graham Holdings Company
- Country: United States
- Based in: Washington, D.C.
- Language: English
- Website: foreignpolicy.com
- ISSN: 0015-7228
- OCLC: 38481287

Foreign Policy is an American news publication founded in 1970 focused on global affairs, current events, and domestic and international policy. It produces content daily on its website and app, and in four print issues annually.

Foreign Policy magazine and ForeignPolicy.com are published by The FP Group, a division of Graham Holdings Company (formerly The Washington Post Company). The FP Group also produces FP Events, Foreign Policy's events division, launched in 2012.

== History ==
Foreign Policy was founded in late 1970 by Samuel P. Huntington, a professor of Harvard University, and his friend Warren Demian Manshel to give a voice to alternative views about American foreign policy at the time of the Vietnam War. Huntington hoped it would be "serious but not scholarly, lively but not glib".

In early 1978, after six years of close partnership, the Carnegie Endowment for International Peace acquired full ownership of Foreign Policy. In 2000, a format change was implemented from a slim quarterly academic journal to a bimonthly magazine. It also launched international editions in Europe, Africa, the Middle East, Asia and Latin America.

In September 2008, Foreign Policy was bought by The Washington Post Company (now Graham Holdings Company). In 2012, Foreign Policy grew to become the FP Group—an expansion of Foreign Policy magazine to include ForeignPolicy.com and FP Events.

== Style ==
According to its submission guidelines, Foreign Policy article aim to "strike the balance" between informed specialist research and general readability, and tend to be written in plain rather than "wonky" language.

== Editorial stance ==
Foreign Policy endorsed Democratic candidate Hillary Clinton in the 2016 US presidential election. This was the first time in its 50-year history the magazine endorsed a candidate.

== Awards ==
Since 2003, Foreign Policy has been nominated for eight National Magazine Awards, winning six: three for its print publication and three for its digital publication at ForeignPolicy.com. FP is the only independent magazine that has won consecutive digital national magazine awards every year from being established in 2009.

2003

- Foreign Policy won the National Magazine Award for Outstanding Achievement and General Excellence in the under 100,000 circulation category.

2007

- Foreign Policy won the National Magazine Award for General Excellence in the 100,000 to 250,000 circulation category.
- Foreign Policy was presented as a Gold Winner by the Eddie Awards for "Who Wins in Iraq", in the Consumer News/Commentary/General Interest category.

2008

- Folio Magazine Gold Editorial Excellence (Eddie) Award – Consumer Magazine, News/Commentary/General Interest (single article), "What America Must Do" by Kenneth Rogoff, Jan/Feb 2008.
- FP's "What America Must Do" feature received the Eddie Award as a Gold Winner for the Consumer News/Commentary/General Interest category for a Single Article.
- Folio Magazine Silver Editorial Excellence (Eddie) Award – Consumer Magazine, News/Commentary/General Interest (single article), "A World Enslaved" by Benjamin Skinner, Mar/Apr 2008.
- Folio Magazine Silver Editorial Excellence (Eddie) Award – Consumer Magazine, News/Commentary/General Interest (full issue), May/June 2008.
- Media Industry Newsletter's (min) "Best of the Web" Award in the blog category for Passport a blog by the editors of Foreign Policy.

2009

- Foreign Policy won the National Magazine Award for General Excellence in the 100,000 to 250,000 circulation category.
- Forbes RealClearWorld designated ForeignPolicy.com as a top international news site.

2010

- Foreign Policy's "The Best Defense" column authored by Tom Ricks received the Digital National Magazine Award for best blog.

2011

- Foreign Policy and former editor-in-chief Susan Glasser were presented with a special citation for the Edward Weintal Prize for Diplomatic Reporting.
- "Turtle Bay", the reported blog by journalist Colum Lynch, won the Digital National Magazine Award for best reporting for a series of hard-hitting investigative articles about the United Nations.

2012

- Foreign Policy won an Overseas Press Club award for General Excellence for the best overall international coverage on a website.
- FP's "Qaddafi Files" won the National Magazine Award for Multimedia.

2014

"Surveillance State" illustration

- Foreign Policy received its first design recognition for "The Surveillance State", appearing in its annual Global Thinkers issue in December 2013. The illustration by Oliver Munday accompanied the marquee story by novelist William T. Vollmann, who discussed "the surveillance state" we knowingly live in after the revelations of wide-reaching surveillance by the NSA. Munday's illustration for FP appeared in the American Illustration annual award book (#33).
- Foreign Policy writers won multiple awards from the United Nations Correspondents Association. Senior diplomatic reporter Colum Lynch received the silver medal for the Elizabeth Neuffer Memorial Prize for his three-part series on the UNAMID peacekeeping mission in Darfur. FP contributor James Reinl won the gold medal in The United Nations Foundation Prize for print for his reporting on Somalia and Kenya, including his story in Foreign Policy titled "Crazy Town" about PTSD in Somalia.

2016

- Foreign Policy contributors received two Overseas Press Club awards for excellence in international reporting. Honorees included Tristian McConnell for his 2015 piece called "Close Your Eyes and Pretend to be Dead", detailing the deadly attack on Nairobi's Westgate Mall in 2013. Christina Larson also received the award for her profile of the entrepreneur Zhao Bowen entitled "The Zhao Method" and featured FP's September/October 2015 print edition.
- Foreign Policy and photographer Andrew Quilty received the George Polk Award in photography for the three part photo series titled "The Man on the Operating Table", showing the destruction following airstrikes on Médecins Sans Frontières (MSF) hospital in Kunduz, Afghanistan in October 2015.

== See also ==
- Foreign policy of the United States
