= Charles A. Ray =

American diplomat

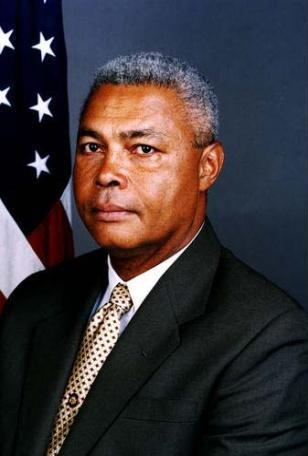

United States Ambassador to Zimbabwe
- In office December 9, 2009 – August 7, 2012
- President: Barack Obama
- Preceded by: James D. McGee
- Succeeded by: David B. Wharton

U.S. Deputy Assistant Secretary of Defense for POW/Missing Personnel Affairs
- In office September 2006 – August 2009
- President: George W. Bush; Barack Obama
- Preceded by: Jerry D. Jennings
- Succeeded by: Robert J. Newberry

United States Ambassador to Cambodia
- In office January 4, 2003 – July 11, 2005
- President: George W. Bush
- Preceded by: Kent M. Wiedemann
- Succeeded by: Joseph A. Mussomeli

Personal details
- Born: 1945 (age 80–81) Center, Texas, U.S.
- Spouse: Myung Wook-soe
- Children: Four
- Education: Benedictine College; Univ. of Southern California; National Defense University
- Occupation: Ambassador
- Profession: Diplomat, Soldier, Author
- Awards: Bronze Star Medal with oak leaf cluster Humanitarian Service Medal
- Website: Official Blog of Ambassador Charles A. Ray

Military service
- Branch/service: United States Army
- Years of service: 1962–1982
- Rank: Major
- Battles/wars: Vietnam War

Charles Aaron Ray (born July 5, 1945) is an American former diplomat who acted as the U.S. ambassador to Zimbabwe between 2009 and 2012. He is a former Foreign Service officer and career member of the Senior Foreign Service who held the position of U.S. ambassador twice, and retired with the rank of minister-counselor. He is also a retired U.S. Army officer who was decorated twice for his actions in combat during the Vietnam War, and later served as the deputy assistant secretary of defense for POW/missing personnel affairs.

== Early life, education, and military service ==
Born in Center, Texas, Ray earned his bachelor's degree from Benedictine College in 1972, his Master of Science from the University of Southern California, and his second Master of Science from the National Defense University.

Ray joined the United States Army in 1962 and retired 20 years later with the rank of major. During his time with the Army, he served in Vietnam (1968–1969, 1972–1973), Germany, Okinawa, and South Korea. In the course of his 20-year Army career, he earned two Bronze Stars and an Armed Forces Humanitarian Service Medal.

== Early diplomatic career ==
After retiring from the U.S. Army in 1982, Ray went to work for the U.S. State Department. During his tenure at the State Department, he served as deputy chief of mission at the U.S. Embassy in Freetown, Sierra Leone, in the State Department's Bureau of Political-Military Affairs, and at the U.S. Consulate General Offices in Guangzhou and Shenyang, China. In 1998, he became the first U.S. consul general in Ho Chi Minh City in Vietnam.

== Ambassador to Cambodia ==
President George W. Bush appointed Ray Ambassador to Cambodia in November 2002. Ray arrived in Phnom Penh on December 26, 2002, and served there until July 2005.

== Return to Texas ==
After serving in Cambodia, Ray returned to Texas to become diplomat-in-residence at the University of Houston, where he recruited students to serve in the State Department and the Foreign Service. In that capacity, he was also responsible for community affairs and outreach with high schools and civic groups.

== Deputy Assistant Secretary of Defense ==
In September 2006, President Bush appointed Ray as Deputy Assistant Secretary of Defense for POW/Missing Personnel Affairs. He reported to Secretaries of Defense Donald Rumsfeld and Robert Gates on administrative and policy matters relating to missing personnel. He was also responsible for creating policies and procedures for determining the status of all Americans missing in action, including rescuing all Americans endangered by combat operations.

== Ambassador to Zimbabwe ==
President Barack Obama nominated Ray as U.S. ambassador to Zimbabwe on August 5, 2009. He was confirmed by the U.S. Senate and sworn into office on October 20, 2009. He arrived at his post in Harare in November, 2009. His assignment in Harare ended in August 2012. He returned to the United States, and on September 1, 2012, retired from public service.

== Author ==
In June 2008, Ray's first book, Things I Learned From My Grandmother About Leadership and Life, was published. His second book, Taking Charge: Effective Leadership for the Twenty-First Century, was published in March 2009. He has authored more than 100 works of fiction and nonfiction, most of which can be seen at h is web site, http://charlesray-author.com/. In addition to his independently published books, he writes westerns for Outlaws Publishing, LLC, Rusty Spurs Publishing, and Dusty Saddle Publishing, including a series of books on the life of Bass Reeves, one of the first African-American deputy U.S. marshals west of the Mississippi River. A complete list of his books can be seen at his Amazon Author Page, https://www.amazon.com/Charles-ray/e/B006WMLEZK.

== Personal ==
Ray is married and has four children.

Diplomatic posts
Preceded by Kent M. Wiedemann	United States ambassador to Cambodia; 2002–2005	Succeeded by Joseph A. Mussomeli
Preceded by James D. McGee	United States ambassador to Zimbabwe; 2009–2012	Succeeded by David B. Wharton
