= Kent M. Wiedemann =

American diplomat

Kent Mans Wiedemann served as U.S. Ambassador to the Kingdom of Cambodia from 1999 to 2002, Chargé d'Affaires ad interim to Burma from 1996 to 1999, and as Deputy Assistant Secretary of State for East Asian and Pacific Affairs, 1998 to 1999. He was director of the office of Chinese Affairs at the Department of State between 1989 and 1991. Other diplomatic postings with the US Department of State were in Poland, China, Singapore and Israel. Wiedemann was a Peace Corps Volunteer in Micronesia from 1967 to 1969.

Wiedemann received his undergraduate degree from San Jose State University in 1967 and an M.A from the University of Oregon in 1973.

Diplomatic posts
Preceded by Marilyn Meyers	Chargé d'Affaires ad interim to Burma; 1996–1999	Succeeded by Priscilla A. Clapp
Preceded by Kenneth M. Quinn	United States Ambassador to Cambodia; 1999–2002	Succeeded by Charles A. Ray
Preceded by	Deputy Assistant Secretary of State for East Asian and Pacific Affairs; 1998–1999	Succeeded by
