= Chum Bunrong =

Cambodian diplomat

His Excellency Chum Bunrong

Cambodian Ambassador to the United States
- In office 3 August 2015 – 16 May 2018
- Monarch: Norodom Sihamoni
- Prime Minister: Hun Sen
- Preceded by: Hem Heng
- Succeeded by: Chum Sounry

Cambodian Ambassador to Mexico
- In office 3 August 2015 – 16 May 2018
- Prime Minister: Hun Sen

Personal details
- Born: 3 April 1950 (age 76)
- Party: Cambodian People's Party
- Children: 4

Military service
- Allegiance: Khmer Republic
- Branch/service: Khmer National Army
- Years of service: 1972–1975
- Rank: Second lieutenant
- Battles/wars: Cambodian Civil War

Chum Bunrong (born 3 April 1950) served as the Cambodian Ambassador to the United States and Mexico from 2015 to 2018.
