= Emory C. Swank =

American diplomat

Emory Coblentz "Coby" Swank (January 29, 1922 – June 3, 2010) was the United States ambassador to Cambodia from 1970 to 1973.

== Personal life ==
Swank was born in Frederick, MD and graduated magna cum laude from Franklin & Marshall College in 1942 where he was a member of Sigma Pi fraternity and Phi Beta Kappa. He earned his master's degree in the English Language and Literature from Harvard University in 1943. He entered the U.S. Army during World War II and was awarded the Bronze Star in Europe. He married Margaret Katherine (Meg) Whiting in 1949. He is described as being 5-foot-10, 170 pounds, soft-spoken, and formal in dress. For years, he did fifty pushups per day.

== State Department Career ==
At the end of the war Swank spent one semester as an English instructor at Franklin and Marshall. In 1946 he began his career with the U.S. State Department. He was fluent in Russian and French and graduated from the National War College

He served in China, Djakarta, and Romania. From 1961 to 1963 he was a special assistant to Secretary of State Dean Rusk. He was appointed deputy chief of mission in Laos in 1964. In 1967 he was named chief deputy to ambassador Llewellyn Thompson in Moscow. In 1968 he was the U.S. signee for a space treaty between Great Britain, Russia, and the United States.

== Cambodia ==
Swank was the first U.S. Ambassador to Cambodia after the U.S. reestablished diplomatic relations with the country in 1969. On September 7, 1970, shortly after arriving in Phnom Penh, he survived an assassination attempt when someone rolled a bomb carrying bicycle towards his car that did not got off. He did not know about the attempt until several hours later.

He boosted the embassy's staff from sixty to two hundred. He passed on orders to Cambodian leader Lon Nol but thought that the U.S. should be doing more to help the country and warned of a civil war. He clashed with State Department leaders about policy towards the country and was eventually reassigned to a dead-end desk job advising NATO. He would later say that his time in Cambodia had been the most frustrating of his career. He would spend two years advising NATO before retiring in 1975.

== Cleveland Council on World Affairs ==
From 1977 to 1987 Swank lived in Cleveland, OH where he headed the Cleveland Council on World Affairs. He revitalized the group by forming a motivated and efficient staff, improving finances and fundraising, and attracted an array of outstanding speakers on international issues which brought in new members. He successfully applied for grants from various foundations, led a Model United Nations, and ran programs for high schools. He also helped start the Akron Council on World Affairs.

After retirement he wrote a book of poems and lectured on cruise ships.

Diplomatic posts
Preceded by Randolph A. Kidder	United States Ambassador to Cambodia; 1970–1973	Succeeded by John Gunther Dean
