= Marilyn Meyers =

American diplomat

Marilyn Ann Meyers (born 1942) is a former American diplomat. She served as Chargé d'Affaires ad interim to Burma from September 1994 to October 1996.

Meyers grew up in Memphis, Tennessee. She completed her undergraduate education at Southwestern at Memphis (now called Rhodes College) with receiving a BA degree with honors in International Studies in 1964. With a Woodrow Wilson Fellowship, she attended the Paul H. Nitze School of Advanced International Studies of Johns Hopkins University where she obtained an MA degree in International Studies in 1966.

Diplomatic posts
Preceded by Franklin Huddle	Chargé d'Affaires ad interim to Burma; 1994–1996	Succeeded by Kent M. Wiedemann
