= William A. Heidt =

American diplomat

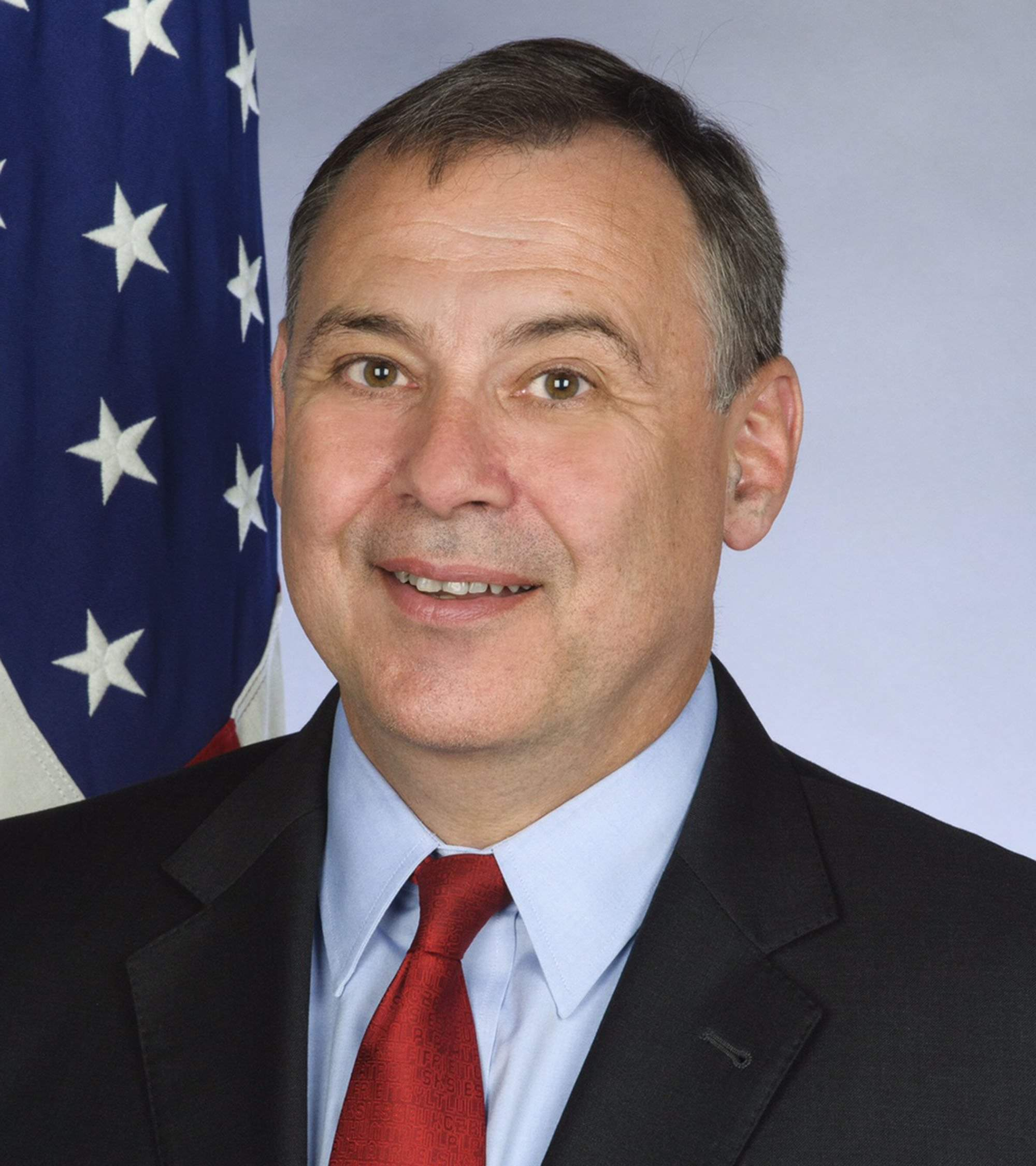

United States Ambassador to Cambodia
- In office September 14, 2015 – November 28, 2018
- President: Barack Obama; Donald Trump
- Preceded by: William E. Todd
- Succeeded by: W. Patrick Murphy

Personal details
- Born: 1961 (age 64–65) Erie, Pennsylvania, U.S.
- Spouse: Sotie Kenmano
- Children: Allen Heidt
- Education: Pennsylvania State University (BA); George Washington University (MA)

William A. "Bill" Heidt (born 1961) is an American diplomat who was the United States Ambassador to Cambodia from 2015 to 2018. He was nominated on April 7, 2015, by President Barack Obama to succeed William E. Todd. He was confirmed by the U.S. Senate on August 5, 2015. and sworn in on September 14, 2015. His term ended on November 28, 2018.

Heidt earned a bachelor's degree in Foreign Service and International Politics from Pennsylvania State University and a master's degree in International Relations from George Washington University.

Diplomatic posts
| Preceded by William E. Todd | United States Ambassador to Cambodia; 2015–2018 | Succeeded by W. Patrick Murphy |
