= Daniel R. Russel =

American diplomat (born 1953)

Daniel Russel
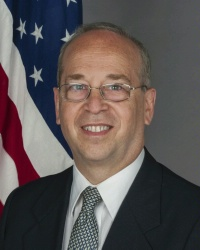

25th Assistant Secretary of State for East Asian and Pacific Affairs
- In office July 16, 2013 – March 8, 2017
- President: Barack Obama; Donald Trump
- Deputy: Scot Marciel
- Preceded by: Kurt Campbell
- Succeeded by: David R. Stilwell

Personal details
- Born: December 12, 1953 (age 72) New Rochelle, New York, U.S
- Education: Sarah Lawrence College; University College London

Daniel R. Russel (born December 12, 1953) is an American diplomat who served as the Assistant Secretary of State for East Asian and Pacific Affairs from 2013 to 2017. Prior to his appointment as Assistant Secretary, Russel was Special Assistant to the President and National Security Staff Senior Director for Asian Affairs. He was a major figure in the Obama administration's "pivot towards Asia" strategy.

Russel is currently Vice President for International Security and Diplomacy at the Asia Society Policy Institute in New York.

== Early career and education ==
Russel is from New Rochelle, New York. He was educated at Sarah Lawrence College and University College, University of London, UK. Before joining the Foreign Service, he was manager for an international firm in New York City.

== Diplomatic career ==
Daniel Russel served as Assistant Secretary of State for East Asian and Pacific Affairs and is a Senior Foreign Service career member. Prior to his appointment as Assistant Secretary on July 12, 2013, Russel served at the White House as Special Assistant to the President and National Security Council (NSC) Senior Director for Asian Affairs. During his tenure there, he helped formulate President Barack Obama's strategic rebalance to the Asia Pacific Region, including efforts to strengthen alliances, deepen U.S. engagement with multilateral organizations, and expand cooperation with emerging powers in the region.

Prior to joining the NSC in January 2009, he served as Director of the Office of Japanese Affairs and had assignments as U.S. Consul General in Osaka-Kobe, Japan (2005-2008); Deputy Chief of Mission at the U.S. Embassy in The Hague, Netherlands (2002-2005); Deputy Chief of Mission at the U.S. Embassy in Nicosia, Cyprus (1999-2002); Chief of Staff to then Under Secretary of State for Political Affairs, Ambassador Thomas R. Pickering (1997–99); Special Assistant to the Under Secretary of State for Political Affairs (1995–96); Political Section Unit Chief at U.S. Embassy Seoul, Republic of Korea (1992–95); Political Advisor to the Permanent Representative to the U.S. Mission to the United Nations, Ambassador Pickering (1989–92); Vice Consul in Osaka and Branch Office Manager in Nagoya, Japan (1987–89); and Assistant to the Ambassador to Japan, former Senate Majority Leader Mike Mansfield (1985–87).

In 1996, Russel was awarded the State Department's Una Chapman Cox Fellowship sabbatical and wrote America’s Place in the World, a book published by Georgetown University.

Political offices
Preceded by Kurt Campbell	Assistant Secretary of State for East Asian and Pacific Affairs; 2013–2017	Succeeded by Susan Thornton; Acting
