= Christopher J. Anderson =

American diplomat

United States Ambassador to Cambodia
- Incumbent
- Assumed office November 7, 2026
- President: Donald Trump
- Preceded by: W. Patrick Murphy

Personal details
- Education: University of Wisconsin–La Crosse (BA); Pennsylvania State University (MPM)

Military service
- Allegiance: United States
- Branch/service: United States Army
- Years of service: 2009–2012
- Battles/wars: War in Afghanistan

Christopher J. Anderson is an American public servant. President Donald J. Trump nominated him to serve as U.S. Ambassador to Cambodia in 2025. Prior to being nominated as Ambassador, he served in the U.S. Army and held various staff positions in the U.S. Senate. He was sworn in as the U.S. Ambassador to Cambodia on September 15, 2026 after more than two years of vacancy. He began his tenure on November 7, 2026 and presented his credentials to King Norodom Sihamoni on November 10.

== Early life and education ==
Anderson earned his undergraduate degree from the University of Wisconsin - La Crosse. He received a master's degree in project management from Penn State in 2022.

== Career ==
From 2009 to 2012, Anderson served in the U.S. Army as a combat engineer, deploying to Afghanistan in 2011.

Anderson held junior roles in the Senate from 2012 to 2015, working for Senators Ron Johnson and Senator Bill Cassidy. From 2016 to 2017, Anderson worked as Senator Cassidy's military legislative aide.

From 2017 to 2021, Anderson worked in the Office of Congressional and Legislative Affairs for the Department of Veterans Affairs.

Starting in May 2022, Anderson worked as a senior aide to Senator Steve Daines, advising on national security policy. He was listed as a contributor to Project 2025.

In August 2026, the Senate voted to confirm Anderson's nomination as part of an "en bloc" package of several dozen presidential nominations.

Diplomatic posts
Preceded by W. Patrick Murphy	United States Ambassador to Cambodia; 2026–present	Incumbent
