= W. Patrick Murphy =

American diplomat (born 1963)

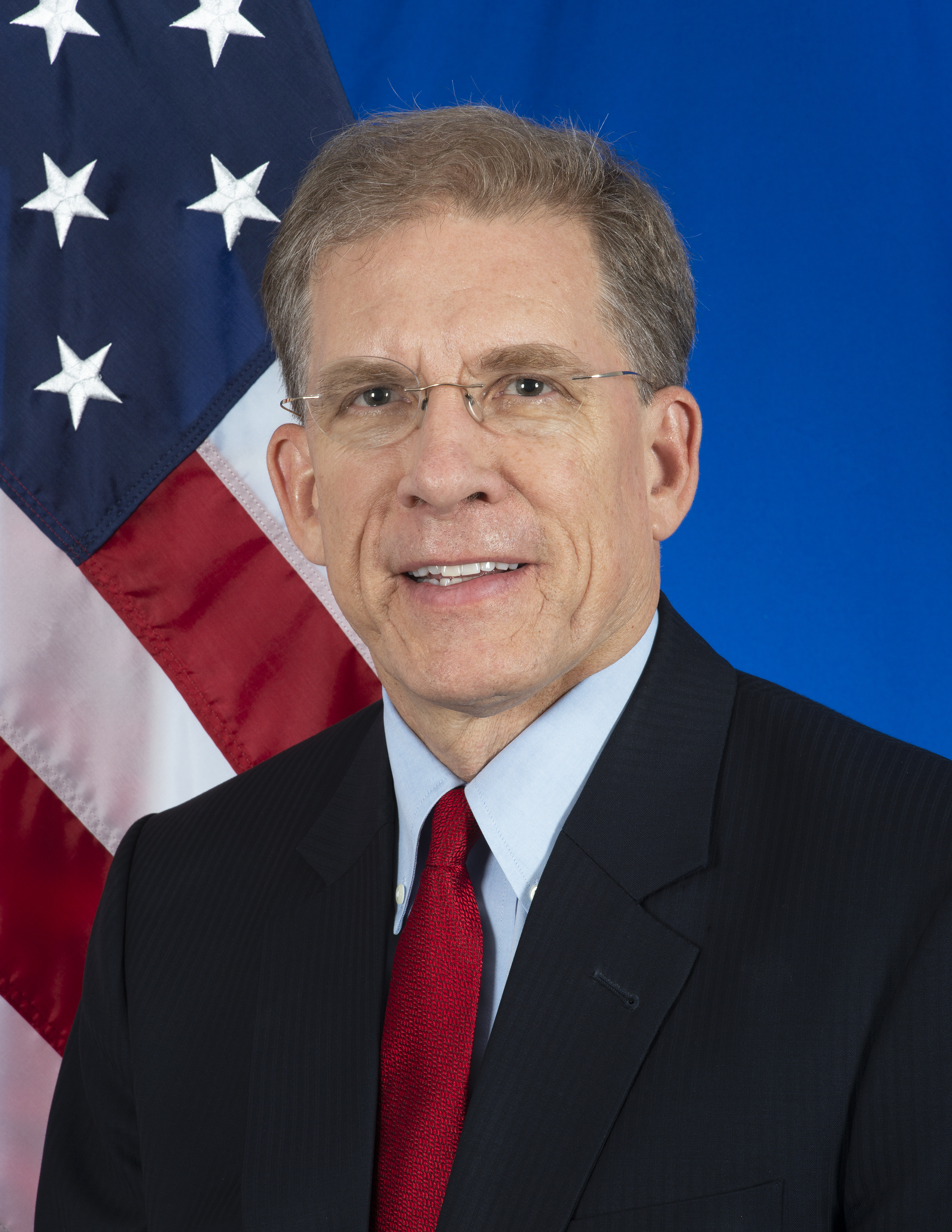

United States Ambassador to Cambodia
- In office August 8, 2019 – May 18, 2024
- President: Donald Trump; Joe Biden
- Preceded by: William Heidt
- Succeeded by: Christopher J. Anderson

Personal details
- Born: Warren Patrick Murphy; 1963 (age 62–63)
- Spouse: Kathleen Norman
- Children: 3
- Education: Johns Hopkins University (MA); National War College (MS); University of Vermont (BA); Institut européen·European Institute
- Occupation: Senior Foreign Service Office

Warren Patrick Murphy (born 1963) is a career U.S. diplomat. A Senior Foreign Service Officer, he served as the Principal Deputy Assistant Secretary of State for the Bureau of East Asian and Pacific Affairs from 2018 to 2019, fulfilling the duties of Acting Assistant Secretary, and Deputy Assistant Secretary of State for Southeast Asia and Multilateral Affairs, 2016–2018. He previously served as Chargé d'affaires and Deputy Chief of Mission in the Kingdoms of Thailand and Lesotho. He was nominated on January 16, 2019 to be Ambassador Extraordinary and Plenipotentiary of the United States of America to the Kingdom of Cambodia. He was the longest-serving U.S. ambassador to Cambodia in history.

== Early life and education ==
Murphy was raised and educated in Vermont, graduating from Brattleboro Union High School (BUHS). In 1985, he obtained a B.A. from the University of Vermont in Political Science and Canadian Studies.

Following his graduation from UVM, Murphy served as a Peace Corps Volunteer in Cameroon and obtained an M.A. in 1991 in International Relations and Canadian Studies from the School of Advanced International Studies (SAIS) at Johns Hopkins University. In 2009, Murphy received a M.S. as a distinguished graduate in National Security Strategy from the National War College.

== Diplomatic career ==
Since his first mission at the U.S. Consulate General in Guangzhou, China, Murphy has completed diplomatic assignments in Thailand, Burma (Myanmar), Iraq, Lesotho, Guinea, and Mali. His experience also includes various positions in Washington, including Acting Special Representative and Policy Coordinator for Burma, Office for Mainland Southeast Asia Director, senior political advisor for the Haiti Working Group, and desk officer for Burma, and Laos.

Murphy's nomination to be the U.S. ambassador to Cambodia was submitted to the Senate on August 16, 2018. He appeared before the Senate Committee on Foreign Relations on December 4, but no further action was taken during the 115th Congress. Murphy's nomination was resubmitted to the 116th Congress on January 16, 2019, and reported favorably by the Senate Committee on Foreign Relations on April 3. It was confirmed by voice vote of the full Senate on August 1, 2019. Murphy presented his credentials to Cambodian King Norodom Sihamoni on October 19, 2019.

== List of diplomatic missions ==
- 2019–2024: Ambassador to Cambodia
- July 2018–June 2019: Principal Deputy Assistant Secretary of State for East Asian and Pacific Affairs (Acting Assistant Secretary)
- 2016–2018: Deputy Assistant Secretary of State for Southeast Asia and Multilateral Affairs
- 2013–2016: Deputy Chief of Mission and Chargés d'affaires ad interim (2014-2015), Embassy Bangkok, Thailand
- 2012–2013: Special Representative and Policy Coordinator for Burma, Acting
- 2011–2012: Director, Mainland Southeast Asia
- 2010–2011: Deputy Director, Mainland Southeast Asia
- 2009–2010: Team Leader, Ninewa Provincial Reconstruction Team, Iraq
- 2006–2008: Deputy Chief of Mission and Chargé, Embassy Maseru, Lesotho
- 2003–2006: Political and Economic Counselor, Embassy Rangoon, Burma
- 2000–2002: Senior Advisor, Haiti Working Group
- 1998–2000: Burma and Laos Desk Officer
- 1995–1998: Political and Economic Chief, Embassy Conakry, Guinea
- 1993–1995: Vice Consul, Consulate General Guangzhou, China
- 1990: Graduate intern, Political and Economic Section, Embassy Bamako, Mali

== Awards and honors ==
Murphy received a dozen of the Department of State's commendations, including the Department of the Army's Superior Civilian Service Award and the National Defense University President's Award. He was also a finalist for the Secretary of State's 2005 Human Rights and Democracy Achievement Award.

== Publications ==
Murphy, W. Patrick, & Vandal, Thomas (July 15, 2010). Winning in Iraq by Working Together. The Washington Times. Sewell, John W., & Murphy, W. Patrick (1992). The United States and Japan in Southeast Asia: Is a Shared Development Agenda Possible? The U.S.-Japan Economic Relationship in East and Southeast Asia, XIV(1), Significant Issues Series, 115–138. Asia-Pacific Association of Japan and the Center for Strategic and International Studies.

== Personal life ==
Murphy speaks French, Burmese, Cantonese, and Spanish. He and his wife Kathleen have one son, Seamus, and two daughters, Meghan and Gillian.

Diplomatic posts
Preceded by William Heidt	United States Ambassador to Cambodia; 2019–2024	Succeeded by Christopher J. Anderson
Vacant
