= Hem Heng =

Cambodian diplomat

His Excellency Hem Heng
- ហែម ហេង
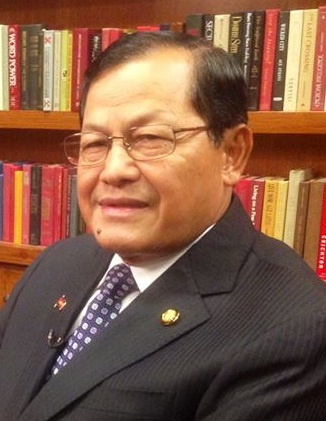

Cambodian Ambassador to the United States
- In office 1 October 2008 – 3 August 2015
- Monarch: Norodom Sihamoni
- Prime Minister: Hun Sen
- Preceded by: Ek Sereyvath
- Succeeded by: Chum Bunrong

Personal details
- Born: 8 November 1951 (age 74) Kampong Cham, Cambodia
- Party: Cambodian People's Party
- Children: 3
- Education: University of Delhi (MA)

Hem Heng (Khmer: ហែម ហេង; born 8 November 1951) is a Cambodian diplomat who was the Cambodian ambassador to the United States from 2008 to 2015. Prior to his appointment, Heng served as an adviser to foreign minister Hor Namhong and has worked in the Ministry of Foreign Affairs. He has had more than 30 years' experience in foreign affairs.

== Biography ==
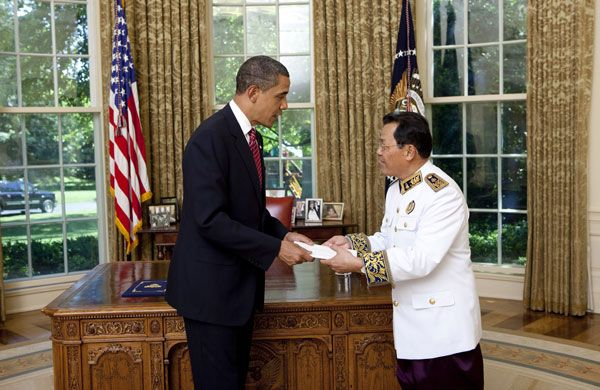
Hem Heng presenting his credentials to U.S. President Barack Obama at the White House in 2009.

Hem Heng was born on 8 November 1951 in Kampong Cham Province. A diplomat with more than 30 years' experience in foreign affairs, he studied at the Agricultural School of Prek Leap and graduated in 1970. His diplomatic career started in June 1979, following the overthrow of the Khmer Rouge, when he joined the Ministry of Foreign Affairs and International Cooperation. From 1983 to 1985, he worked as the bureau chief in the ministry's Protocol Department. Following this duty, his first foreign assignment took him to Hanoi, Vietnam, where he served as second secretary in the Cambodian embassy.

He was made deputy director of the Economic Cooperation Department in 1992 and served in this role for four years. During this period he attended the Royal School of Administration in Phnom Penh, earning a Certificate in Public Administration (1993). In 1996, Heng was promoted to deputy director general of the ASEAN Directorate for the foreign ministry.

In 1998, he was posted to India, serving as minister counselor in the Cambodian embassy. While in New Delhi, he attended the Indian Academy of International Law and Diplomacy, earning a degree in 1999 in international law, international organizations and diplomacy. He also received his Master of Arts in political science from the University of Delhi in 2001. From 2004 to 2006, Heng was Director of Information and Documentation for the foreign ministry and concurrently was an adviser to the deputy prime minister until October 2008, when he was appointed ambassador to the United States.

== Personal life ==
Heng speaks Khmer, English and French. He is married and has three sons.

Political offices
Preceded by Ek Sereyvath	Ambassador of Cambodia to the United States; 2008–2015	Succeeded by Chum Bunrong
