= Charles H. Twining =

American career Foreign Service officer (born 1940)

Charles H. Twining Jr. (born November 1, 1940) is an American diplomat. A career Foreign Service Officer, he served as chargé d'affaires ad interim to Benin (July 1982 – October 1983), Representative to Cambodia (Presentation of Credentials on November 11, 1991) and then Ambassador Extraordinary and Plenipotentiary (1994–1995) and served concurrent appointments to Cameroon and Equatorial Guinea from 1995 to 1998.

On October 19, 2014, while driving in an armored diplomatic convoy in South Sudan, a South Sudanese soldier fired two bullets at close range into a U.S. Embassy vehicle., At the time, Twining was the chargé d'affaires.

== Biography ==
Twining was born in Baltimore, Maryland on November 1, 1940. He grew up on a farm in Glen Arm, Maryland and attended Glen Arm, Maryland, graduating in 1958. He attended the University of Virginia, Class of 1962. When he graduated, Twining volunteered with Operation Crossroads Africa. When he returned, he attended the Paul H. Nitze School of Advanced International Studies.

== Cambodia ==
The highest-ranking American diplomat to serve in Cambodia since the mid-1970's, Twining went on record saying that while he did not think the Khmer Rouge would return to power, he would not rule it out.
