= Carol A. Rodley =

American diplomat

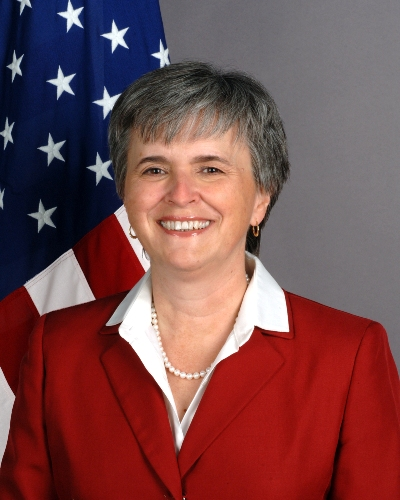
Carol A Rodley

Ambassador Carol A. Rodley is the director of resolution to act at Inclusive Security. She was dean of the Leadership and Management School at the State Department's Foreign Service Institute and was the US ambassador to Cambodia from 2008 to 2011.

During her tenure in Cambodia, she believed the private sector was the key to Cambodia's development so she “promoted foreign investment in Cambodia by reducing corruption, advocated strongly for the US Government to remove Cambodia from its Marxist-Leninist country list, and eliminated barriers for small and medium enterprises to obtain financing.”,

A native of Massachusetts and Smith College graduate, Rodley was acting assistant secretary and principal deputy assistant secretary in the Bureau of Intelligence and Research from 2003 to 2006.
