= Line 4A (Phnom Penh Bus Rapid Transit) =

Bus route in Phnom Penh, Cambodia

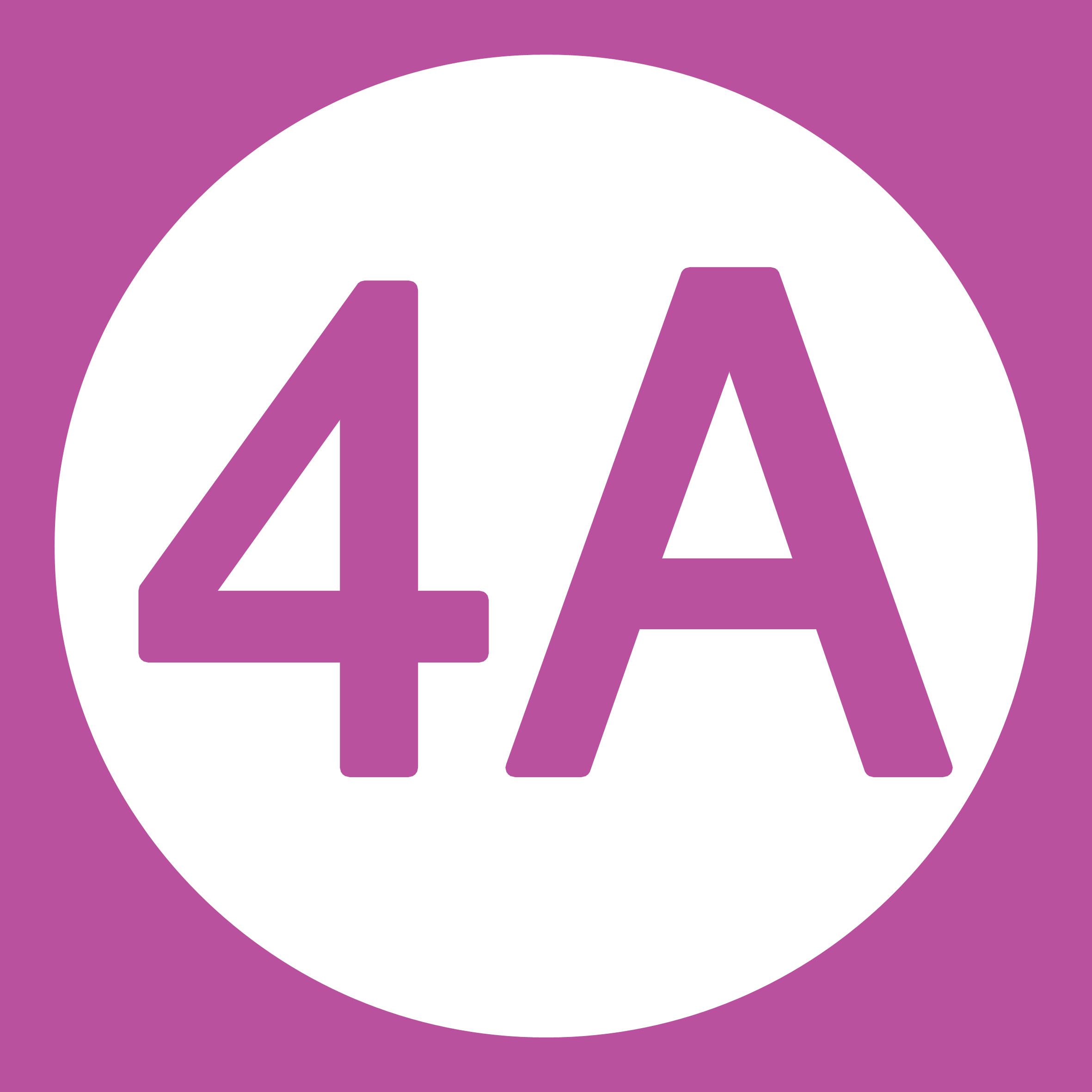

Overview
- System: Phnom Penh City Bus
- Operator: Phnom Penh Municipal Government
- Status: Operational
- Began service: August 2017

Route
- Route type: Bus rapid transit
- Locale: Phnom Penh, Cambodia
- Start: Russey Keo Garden Terminal
- End: Borey Santepheap 2 Terminal
- Length: 19.6 km
- Stations: 70

Line 4A (ខ្សែទី៤A) is a route of the Phnom Penh City Bus network in Phnom Penh, Cambodia. It runs northeast to southwest.

The line is represented in the official Phnom Penh City Bus map by Lavender.

== Stations ==
Number	Station Name (Khmer)	Station Name (English)	Transfer	Street	Location
1	សួនឫស្សីកែវ	Russey Keo Garden	Line 01 Line 03 Line 4B	National Road 5	Phnom Penh
2/3	គ្លីនិចរ៉ាក	Clinic Rak	Line 01 Line 03 Line 4B	National Road 5	Phnom Penh
4/5	ភូមិសាមគ្គី	Samaki Village	Line 01 Line 03 Line 4B	National Road 5	Phnom Penh
6/7	សាលាបឋមសិក្សាពញាក្រែក	Ponheakraek Primary School	Line 01 Line 03 Line 4B	National Road 5	Phnom Penh
8/9	មណ្ឌលសុខភាពដូនពេញ	Duan Penh Health Center	Line 01 Line 03 Line 4B	National Road 5	Phnom Penh
10/11	រង្វង់មូលស្តាតចាស់	Old Stadium Roundabout	Line 01 Line 02 Line 03 Line 4B Line 06	National Road 5	Phnom Penh
12/13	ក្រសួងកិច្ចការនារី	Ministry of Women Affair	Line 02 Line 03 Line 4B	France (47)	Phnom Penh
14/15	មជ្ឈមណ្ឌលជាតិគាំកាពារមាតានិងទារក	National Maternal and Child Health Center	Line 02 Line 03 Line 4B	France (47)	Phnom Penh
16/17	មន្ទីរពេទ្យគន្ធបុប្ផា	Kantha Bopha IV Children's Hospital	Line 02 Line 03 Line 4B	France (47)	Phnom Penh
18/19	មន្ទីរពេទ្យអង់ដួង	Ang Duong Hospital	Line 02 Line 03 Line 4B	Norodom Boulevard (41)	Phnom Penh
20/21	ផ្សារធំថ្មី	Central Market	Line 03 Line 4B	Khemarak Phoumin Ave (130)	Phnom Penh
22/23	រោងកុនសូរីយ៉ា	Soriya Cinema	Line 01 Line 4B	142	Phnom Penh
24/25	រោងកុនអង្គរ	Angkor Cinema	Line 01 Line 4B	Charles de Gaulle Blvd (217)	Phnom Penh
26/27	ផ្សារអូឫស្សី	Ourussey Market	Line 4B	Charles de Gaulle Blvd (217)	Phnom Penh
28/29	រត្តព្រះពុទ្ធមានបុណ្យ	Preah Puth Mean Bon Pagoda	Line 7A Line 4B	Charles de Gaulle Blvd (217)	Phnom Penh
30/31	ផ្សារសីុធីម៉ល	City Mall	Line 4B	Charles de Gaulle Blvd (217)	Phnom Penh
32	បណ្ណាគារលាងហេង	Leang Heng Bookstore	Line 4B	Samdech Monireth Blvd (217)	Phnom Penh
33	សាលាអន្តរជាតិប៊ែលធី	Belti International School	Line 4B	Samdech Monireth Blvd (217)	Phnom Penh
34/35	សាលាអន្តរជាតិអូឡាំពិច	International Olympic School	Line 4B	Samdech Monireth Blvd (217)	Phnom Penh
36	សណ្ធាគារអ៊ីធ័រខន	Intercontinental Hotel	Line 05 Line 4B	Samdech Monireth Blvd (217)	Phnom Penh
37	មហោស្រពចេបឡា	Chenla Theatre	Line 05 Line 4B	Samdech Monireth Blvd (217)	Phnom Penh
38/39	ស្ពានអាកាសស្ទឹងមានជ័យ	Steung Meanchey SKybridge	Line 7B Line 4B	Samdech Monireth Blvd (217)	Phnom Penh
40	វត្តស្ទឹងមានជ័យ	Steung Meanchey Pagoda	Line 4B	Samdech Monireth Blvd (217)	Phnom Penh
41	សាលាបឋមស្ទឹងមានជ័យ	Steung Meanchey Primary School	Line 4B	Samdech Monireth Blvd (217)	Phnom Penh
42	ផ្សារស្ទឹងមានជ័យចាស់	Steung Meanchey Market	Line 4B	Samdech Monireth Blvd (217)	Phnom Penh
43	សាកលវិទ្យាល័យឯកទេសនៃកម្ពុជា	Cambodian University of Specialties	Line 4B	Samdech Monireth Blvd (217)	Phnom Penh
44	វិទ្យាស្ថានជាតីពាណិជ្ជកម្ម	National Institute of Business	Line 4B	Samdech Monireth Blvd (217)	Phnom Penh
45	វត្តនន្ទមុនី	Nonmony Pagoda	Line 4B	Samdech Monireth Blvd (217)	Phnom Penh
46	ភោជនីដ្ធានរាត្រីមនោរម្យ	Monor Rom Restaurant	Line 4B	Veng Sreng Blvd	Phnom Penh
47	សាលាអន្តរជាតិប៊ែលធីស្ទឹងមានជ័យ	Belti International School Steung Meanchey	Line 4B	Veng Sreng Blvd	Phnom Penh
48/49	បុរីប៉េងហួតស្ទឹងមានជ័យ	Borey Penghouth Steung Meanchey	Line 4B	Veng Sreng Blvd	Phnom Penh
50/51	ផ្សារឯករាជIII	Ekreach III Market	Line 4B	Veng Sreng Blvd	Phnom Penh
52/53	ធនាគារវឌ្ឍនៈ	Vattanac Bank Steung Meanchey Branch	Line 4B	Veng Sreng Blvd	Phnom Penh
54/55	ផ្សារកាណាឌីយ៉ា	Canadia Market	Line 4B	Veng Sreng Blvd	Phnom Penh
56/57	អាងទឹកកាណាឌីយ៉ា	Canadia Water Supply	Line 4B	Veng Sreng Blvd	Phnom Penh
58/59	រោងចក្រខ្វលីធីតេក្សស្ទីល	Garment Factory Quality Textile			Phnom Penh
60/61	ផ្សារទួលពង្រ	Tuol Pongro Market			Phnom Penh
62/63	បុរី អេស.ជេ.អាយ.អេស.	Borey SJSI			Phnom Penh
64/65	វត្តកំពែង	Kampaeng Pagoda			Phnom Penh
66/67	វត្តព្រះធម្មត្រ័យ	Preah Thom Trai Pagoda			Phnom Penh
68/69	រោងចក្រជេនេរ៉ល	General Factory			Phnom Penh
70	បូរីសន្តិភាព២	Borey Santepheap 2	Line 03 Line 09		Phnom Penh

== History ==
This line used to be represented by the color Purple but switched to Lavender when Line 09 was added in January 2018.

== See also ==
- Phnom Penh City Bus
- Transport in Phnom Penh
- Phnom Penh
