= Night Market BRT station =

Bus station in Phnom Penh, Cambodia

Coordinates: 11.574245°N 104.927113°E

Night Market សេវារថយន្តក្រុងសាធារណ
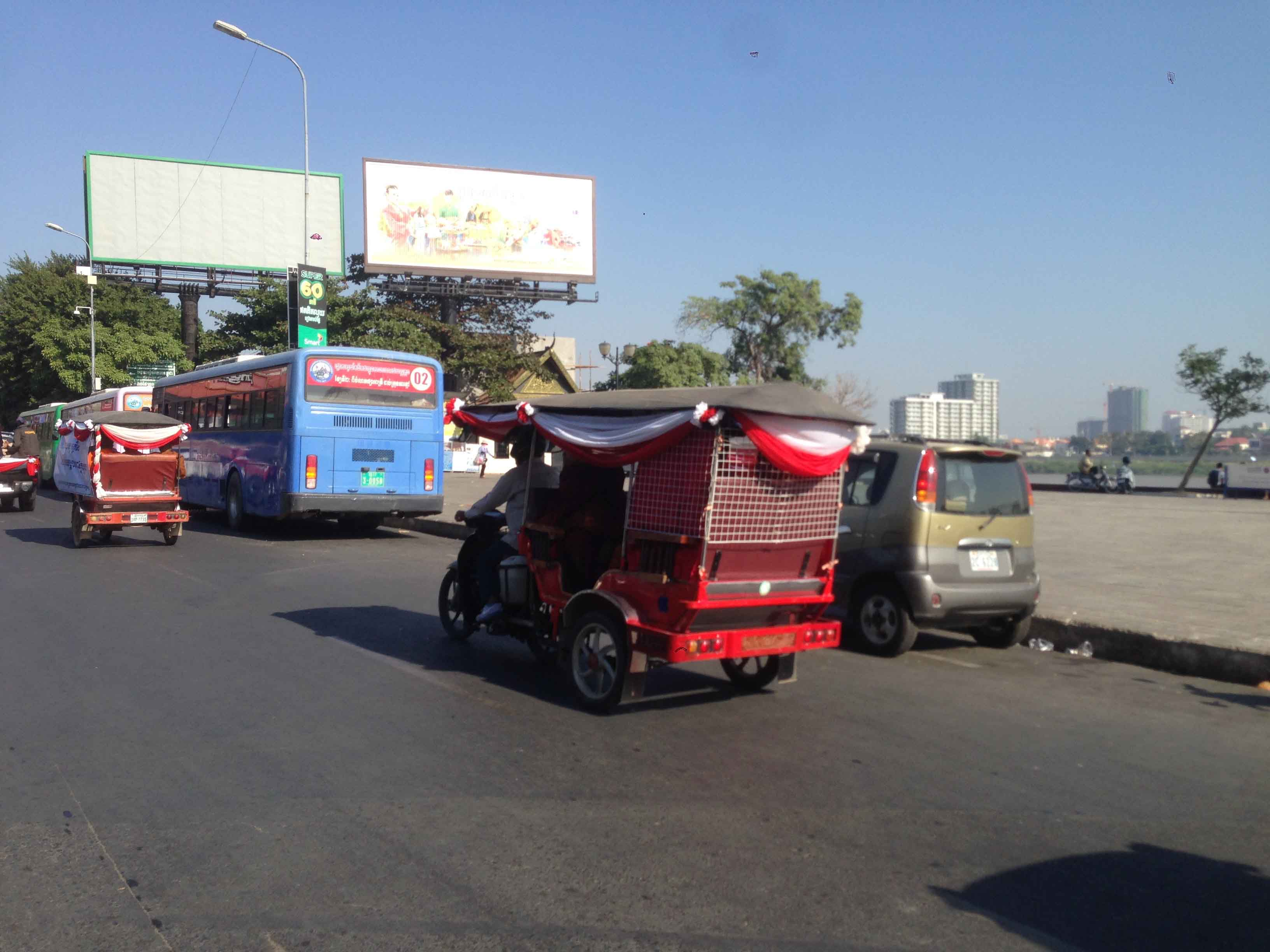
- Night Market terminus station on Sisowath Quay

General information
- Location: Sisowath Quay, Phnom Penh
- System: Phnom Penh City Bus
- Lines: Line 02, Line 03
Location

The Night Market Station is the terminus station for Line 02 and Line 03 on the Phnom Penh BRT bus rapid transit network in central Phnom Penh, Cambodia, located on Sisowath Quay.

Bus rapid transit network in Phnom Penh

== Nearby Attractions ==
- Foreign Correspondents' Club, Phnom Penh
- Night Market
- Wat Phnom

== See also ==
- Phnom Penh City Bus
- Transport in Phnom Penh
- Line 02 (Phnom Penh Bus Rapid Transit)
- Line 03 (Phnom Penh Bus Rapid Transit)
