= Line 02 (Phnom Penh Bus Rapid Transit) =

Bus route in Phnom Penh, Cambodia

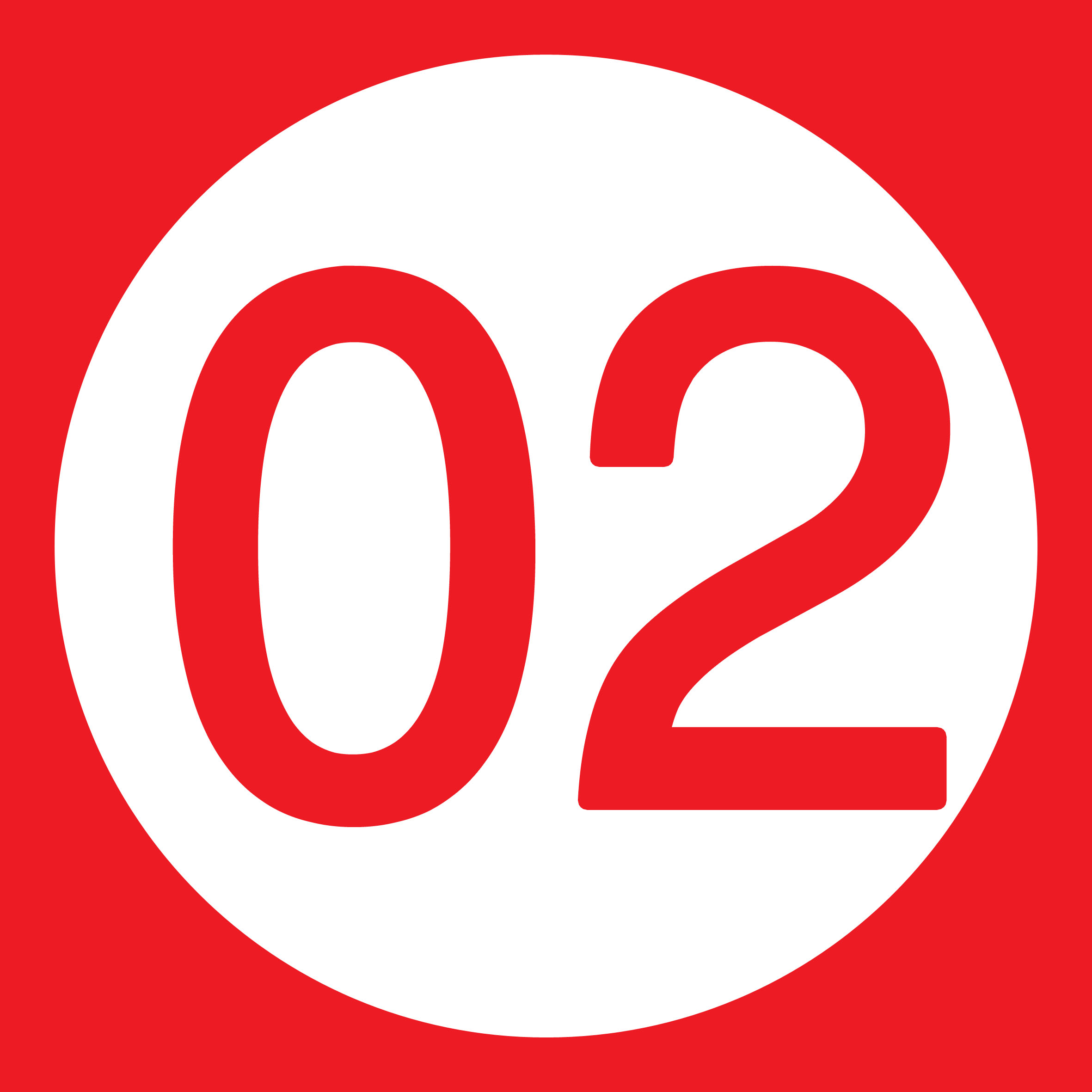

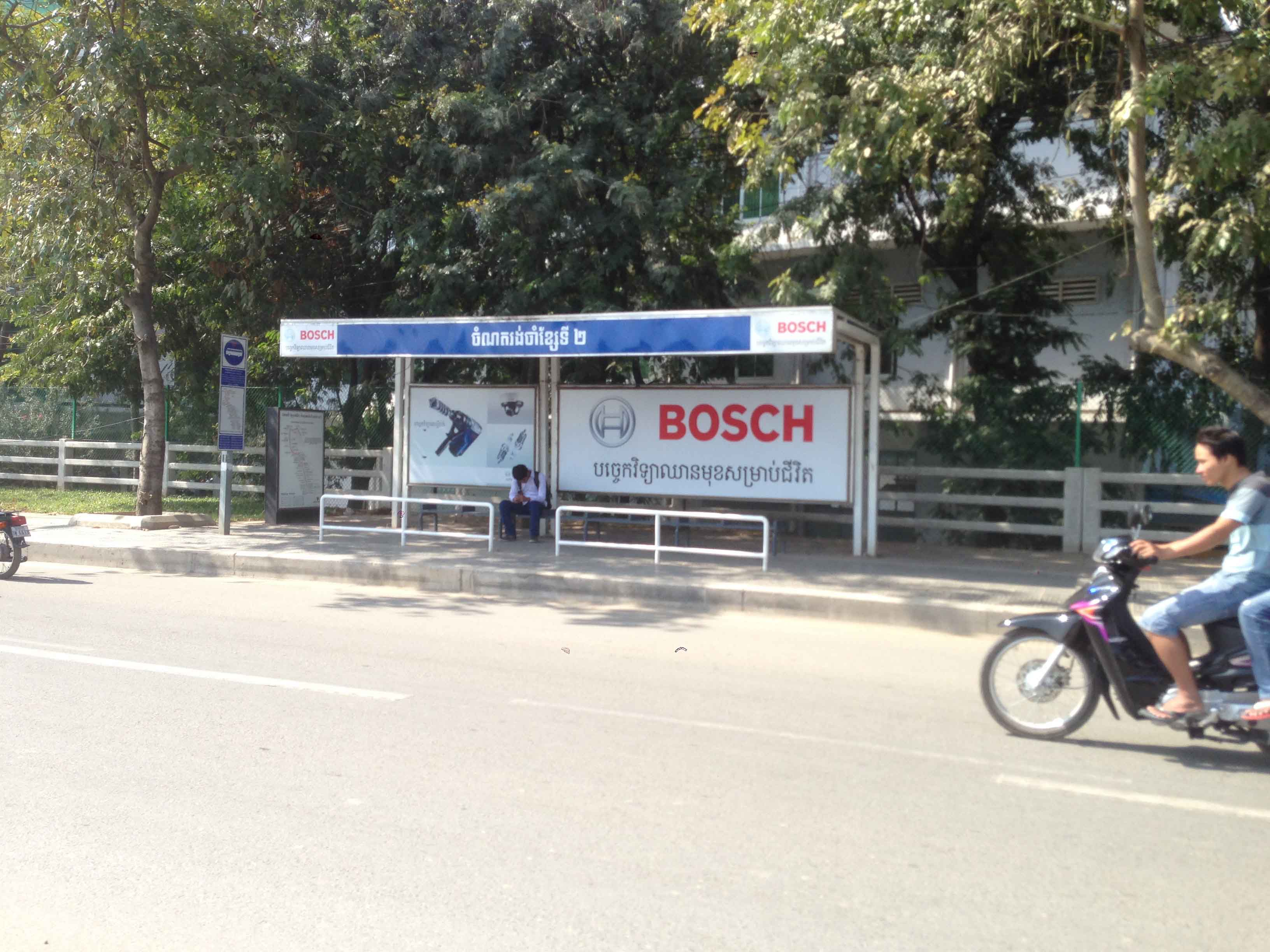

Overview
- System: Phnom Penh City Bus
- Operator: Phnom Penh Municipal Government
- Status: Operational
- Began service: September 2014

Route
- Route type: Bus rapid transit
- Locale: Phnom Penh, Cambodia
- Start: Aeon Mall 2
- End: Ta Khmao Market
- Length: 18.2 km
- Stations: 74

Line 02 (ខ្សែទី២) is a route of the Phnom Penh City Bus network in Phnom Penh, Cambodia.

The line is represented on the official Phnom Penh City Bus map in Red.

== Stations ==
Number	Station Name (Khmer)	Station Name (English)	Transfer	Street	Location
1	ផ្សារទំនើបអ៊ីអន២	Aeon Mall 2	Line 05	1003	Phnom Penh
2/3	បូរីពិភពថ្មី	Borey New World	Line 05	1003	Phnom Penh
4/5	ស្តុបបូរីពិភពថ្មី	St. Oknha Mong Rithy-1003	Line 05	1003	Phnom Penh
6/7	កាហ្វេប្រោន	Coffee Brown	Line 06	Oknha Mong Rithy (1928)	Phnom Penh
8/9	បូរីប៉េងហួត	Borey Peng Huoth	Line 06	Oknha Mong Rithy (1928)	Phnom Penh
10/11	វិទ្យាស្ថានជប៉ុន	Japan Institute	Line 06	Oknha Mong Rithy (1928)	Phnom Penh
12/13	រង្វង់មូលកាំកូស៊ីធី	Camko City Roundabout	Line 06	355	Phnom Penh
14/15	អង់តែនទួលគោក	Toul Kok TVK BRT station	Line 06	355	Phnom Penh
16/17	ស្ថានីយ៏បូមទឹកទួលគោក២	Toul Kok 2 Pumping Station	Line 06	273	Phnom Penh
18/19	សាលាប៉េកាំង	Beijing International Academy	Line 06	273	Phnom Penh
20/21	រង្វង់មូលស្តាតចាស់	Old Stadium Roundabout	Line 01 Line 03 Line 4A Line 4B Line 06	273	Phnom Penh
22/23	ក្រសួងកិច្ចការនារី	Ministry of Women Affair	Line 03 Line 4A Line 4B	France (47)	Phnom Penh
24/25	មជ្ឈមណ្ឌលជាតិគាំកាពារមាតានិងទារក	National Maternal and Child Health Center	Line 03 Line 4A Line 4B	France (47)	Phnom Penh
26/27	មន្ទីរពេទ្យគន្ធបុប្ផា	Kantha Bopha IV Children's Hospital	Line 03 Line 4A Line 4B	France (47)	Phnom Penh
28/29	ផ្សារធំថ្មី	Central Market	Line 03 Line 4A Line 4B	Norodom Boulevard (41)	Phnom Penh
30/31	អង្គភាពប្រឆាំងអំពើពុករលួយ	Anti-corruption Unit		Norodom Boulevard (41)	Phnom Penh
32/33	អនុវិទ្យាល័យចតុមុខ	Chaktomuk Secondary School		Norodom Boulevard (41)	Phnom Penh
34/35	វិទ្យាស្ថានជាតិអប់រំ	National Institute of Education	Line 7A	Norodom Boulevard (41)	Phnom Penh
36/37	ស្តុបកាកបាតក្រហម	Red Cross Stop	Line 7A	Norodom Boulevard (41)	Phnom Penh
38/39	ក្រុមហ៊ុនម៉ុងរិទ្ធិគ្រុប	Mong Rithy Group		Norodom Boulevard (41)	Phnom Penh
40/41	វត្តថាន់	Thann Pagoda		Norodom Boulevard (41)	Phnom Penh
42/43	ក្រសួងកសិកម្ម រុក្ខាប្រមាញ់ និង នេសាទ	Ministry of Agriculture Forestry and Fisheries	Line 05	Norodom Boulevard (41)	Phnom Penh
44/45	ក្រសួងមហាផ្ទៃ	Ministry of Interior		Norodom Boulevard (41)	Phnom Penh
46/47	ក្រសួងវប្បធម៍ និងវិចិត្រសិល្បៈ	Ministry of Culture and Fine Arts	Line 01 Line 7B	Norodom Boulevard (41)	Phnom Penh
48/49	ផ្សារក្បាលថ្នល់	Khar Tuol Market	Line 01 Line 7B	National Road 2	Phnom Penh
50/51	វត្តចាក់អង្រែលើ	Changangreleour Pagoda		National Road 2	Phnom Penh
52/53	រោងចក្របេតុង CPAC	CPAC Concrete Plant		National Road 2	Phnom Penh
54/55	រោងចក្រអគ្គិសនីទី២	Electric Plant II		National Road 2	Phnom Penh
56/57	វិទ្យាល័យហ៊ុនសែនចាក់អង្រែ	Hun Sen Chakangre Secondary School		National Road 2	Phnom Penh
58/59	សកលវិទ្យាល័យអាយអាយស៊ី	IIC University		National Road 2	Phnom Penh
60/61	ភូមិទួលរកា	Rokar Village		National Road 2	Phnom Penh
62/63	អគ្គិសនីចាក់អង្រែក្រោម	Chakangre Krom Electricity		National Road 2	Phnom Penh
64/65	ចាក់អង្រែក្រោម	Chakangre Krom		National Road 2	Phnom Penh
66/67	មជ្ឈមណ្ឌលចាក់អង្រែក្រោម	Chakangre Krom Center		National Road 2	Phnom Penh
68/69	រង្វង់មូលព្រះនរាយន៍	Preah Noeney Roundabout		National Road 2	Ta Khmao, Kandal Province
70	មន្ទីរសាធារណានិងដឹកជញ្ជូន ខេត្តកណ្ដាល	Department of Public Works of the Kandal Province		National Road 2	Ta Khmao, Kandal Province
71	សាលាខេត្តតាខ្មៅ	Ta Khmao Municipality		National Road 2	Ta Khmao, Kandal Province
72	ស្ពានថ្មតាខ្មៅ	Ta Khmao Brigade		National Road 2	Ta Khmao, Kandal Province
73	ផ្សារតាខ្មៅ	Ta Khmao Market		National Road 2	Ta Khmao, Kandal Province
74	មន្ទីរវប្បធម៍តាខ្មៅ	Ta Khmao Culture Department		National Road 2	Ta Khmao, Kandal Province
75	រង្វង់មូលតាខ្មៅ	Ta Khmao Roundabout		National Road 2	Ta Khmao, Kandal Province

== See also ==
- Phnom Penh City Bus
- Transport in Phnom Penh
- Phnom Penh
