= Line 01 (Phnom Penh Bus Rapid Transit) =

Bus route in Phnom Penh, Cambodia

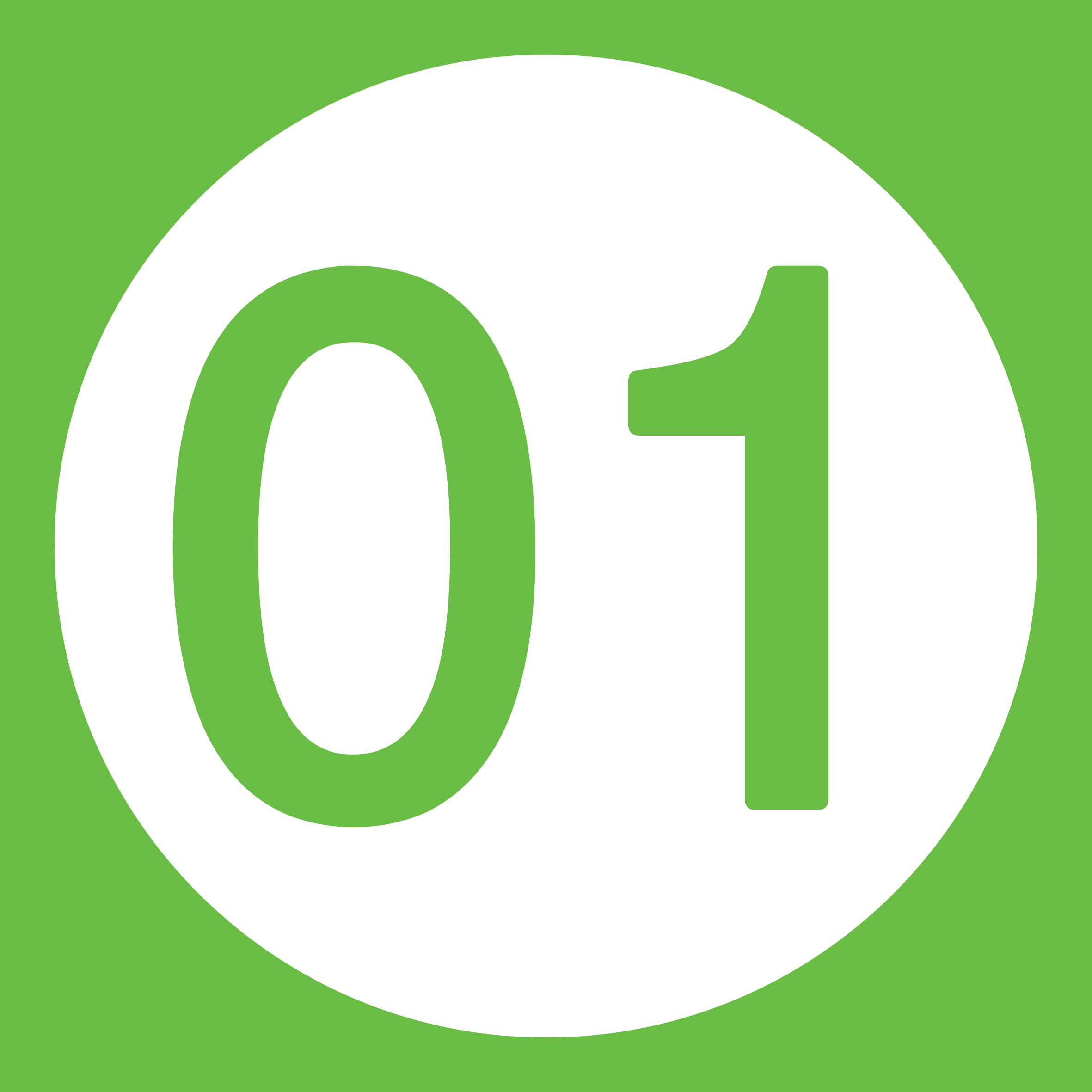

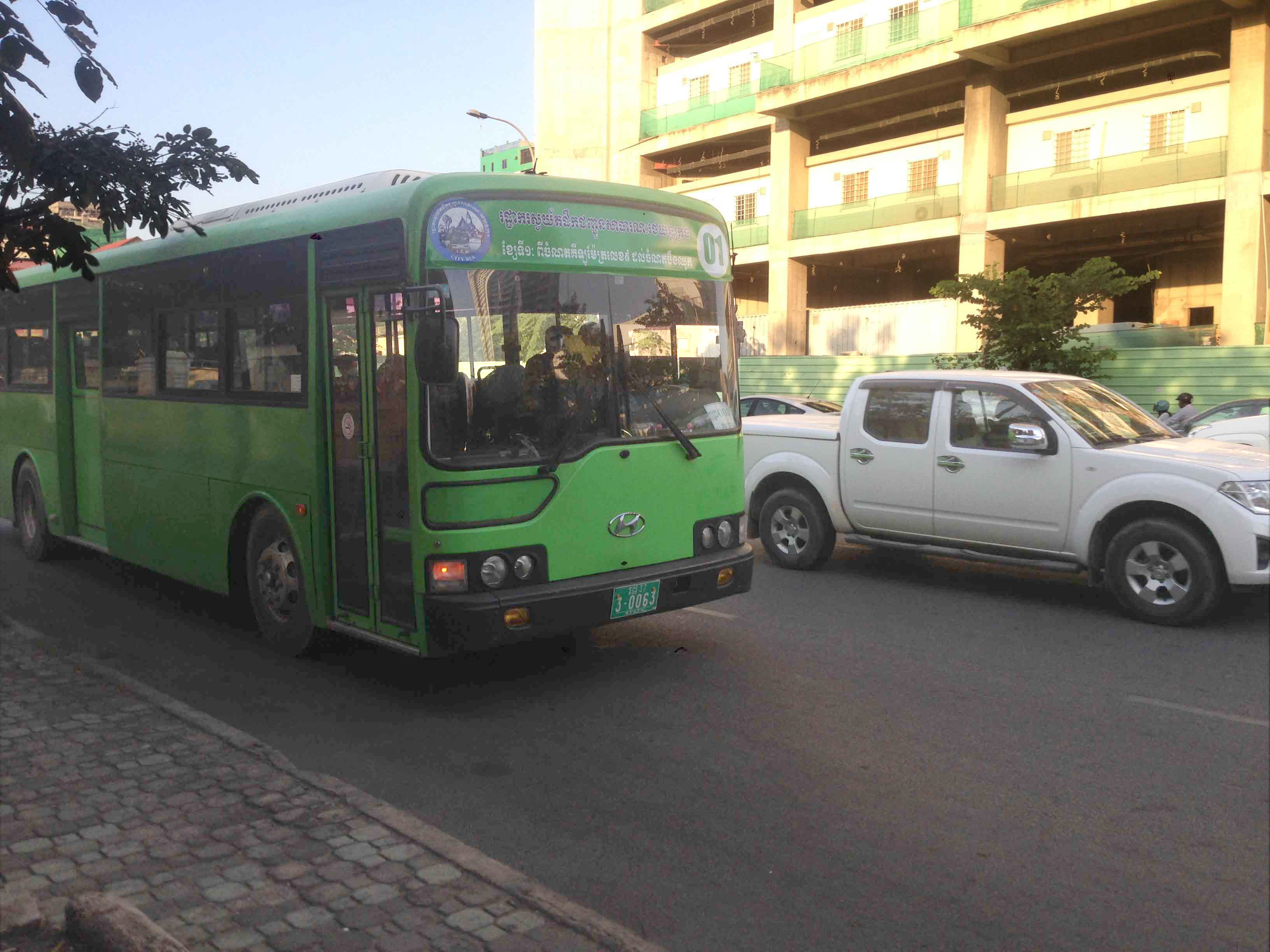

Overview
- System: Phnom Penh City Bus
- Operator: Phnom Penh Municipal Government
- Status: Operational
- Began service: September 2014

Route
- Route type: Bus rapid transit
- Locale: Phnom Penh, Cambodia
- Start: Kilometre 9 Terminal
- End: Okaha Suy Sophan Bus Terminal
- Length: 18.5 km
- Stations: 66
Route map
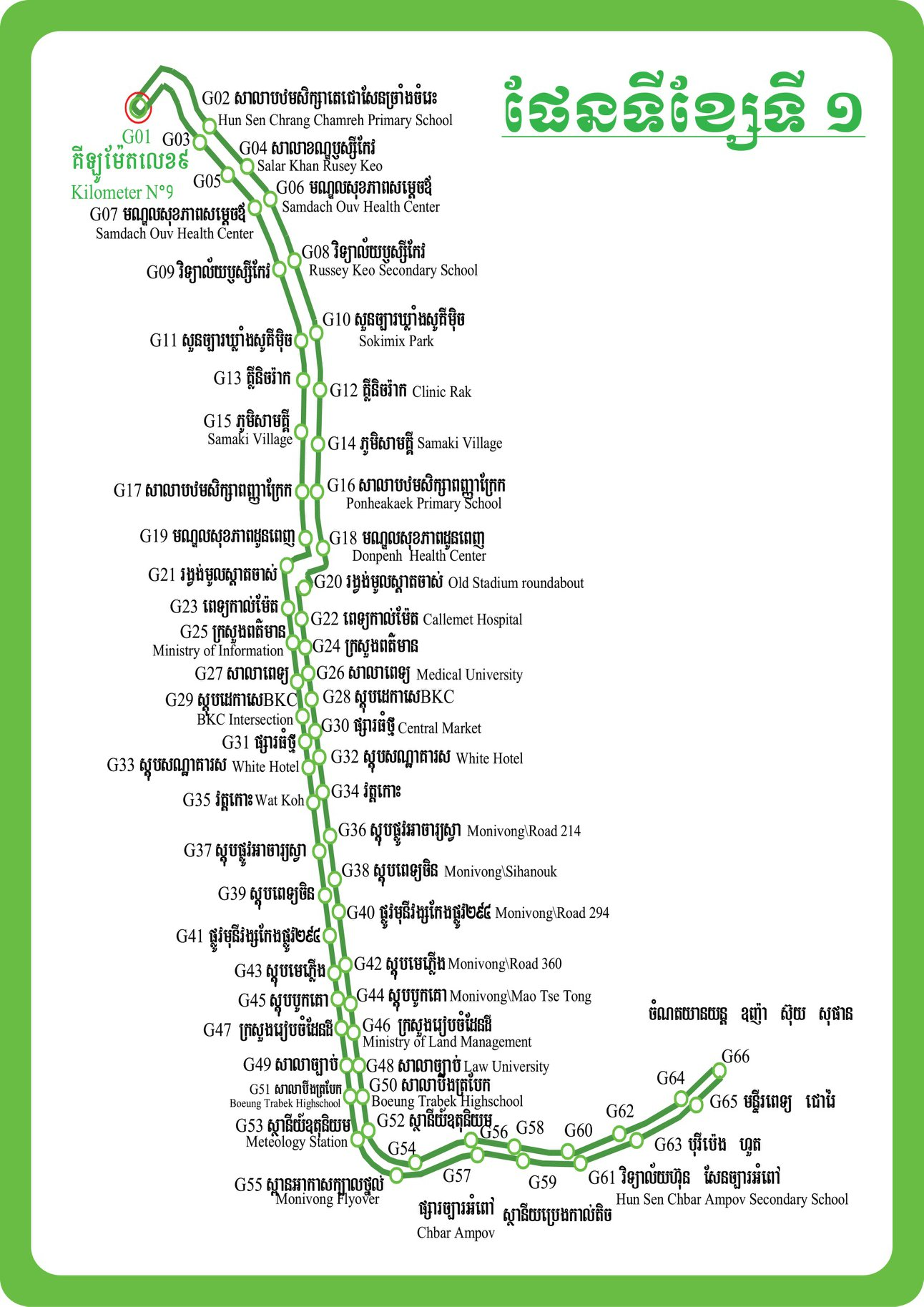

Line 01 (ខ្សែទី១) is a route of the Phnom Penh City Bus network in Phnom Penh, Cambodia.

The line is represented on the official Phnom Penh City Bus map in Green.

== Stations ==
Number	Station Name (Khmer)	Station Name (English)	Transfer	Street	Location
1	គីឡូម៉ែតលេខ៩	Kilometer 9 Terminal	Line 7A Line 7B Line 08	National Road 5	Phnom Penh
2/3	សាលាបឋមសិក្សាតេជោសែនច្រាំងចំរះ	Hun Sen Charng Chamreh Primary School		National Road 5	Phnom Penh
4/5	សាលាខណ្ឌឫស្សីកែវ	Sala Khan Russey Keo		National Road 5	Phnom Penh
6/7	មណ្ឌលសុខភាពសម្ដេចឪ	Samdach Ouv Health Center		National Road 5	Phnom Penh
8/9	វិទ្យាល័យឫស្សីកែវ	Russey Keo Secondary School		National Road 5	Phnom Penh
10/11	សួនច្បារឃ្លាំងសូគីមិច	Sokimex Park		National Road 5	Phnom Penh
12/13	គ្លីនិចរ៉ាក	Clinic Rak	Line 03 Line 4A Line 4B	National Road 5	Phnom Penh
14/15	ភូមិសាមគ្គី	Samaki Village	Line 03 Line 4A Line 4B	National Road 5	Phnom Penh
16/17	សាលាបឋមសិក្សាពញាក្រែក	Ponheakraek Primary School	Line 03 Line 4A Line 4B	National Road 5	Phnom Penh
18/19	មណ្ឌលសុខភាពដូនពេញ	Duan Penh Health Center	Line 03 Line 4A Line 4B	National Road 5	Phnom Penh
20/21	រង្វង់មូលស្តាតចាស់	Old Stadium Roundabout	Line 02 Line 03 Line 4A Line 4B Line 06	National Road 5	Phnom Penh
22/23	ពេទ្យកាលម៉ែត	Calmette Hospital		Monivong Boulevard (National Road 1)	Phnom Penh
24/25	ក្រសួងពត៍មាន	Ministry of Information		Monivong Boulevard (National Road 1)	Phnom Penh
26/27	សាលាពេទ្យ	Medical University		Monivong Boulevard (National Road 1)	Phnom Penh
28/29	ស្តុបបេកាសេ	BKC Intersection		Monivong Boulevard (National Road 1)	Phnom Penh
30/31	ផ្សារធំថ្មី	Central Market	Line 03	Monivong Boulevard (National Road 1)	Phnom Penh
32/33	ស្តុបសណ្ធាគារស	White Hotel	Line 4A Line 4B	Monivong Boulevard (National Road 1)	Phnom Penh
34/35	វត្តកោះ	Koh Pagoda		Monivong Boulevard (National Road 1)	Phnom Penh
36/37	ស្តុបផ្លូវអាចារ្យស្វា	Monivong-Road 214	Line 7A	Monivong Boulevard (National Road 1)	Phnom Penh
38/39	ស្តុបពេទ្យចិន	Monivong-Sihanouk	Line 7A	Monivong Boulevard (National Road 1)	Phnom Penh
40/41	ផ្លូវមុនីវង្សផ្លូវ២៩៤	Monivong-Road 294		Monivong Boulevard (National Road 1)	Phnom Penh
42/43	ស្តុបមេភ្លើង	Monivong-Road 360		Monivong Boulevard (National Road 1)	Phnom Penh
44/45	ស្តុបបូកគោ	Monivong-Mao Tse Tong	Line 05	Monivong Boulevard (National Road 1)	Phnom Penh
46/47	ក្រសួងរៀបចំដែនដី	Ministry of Land Management		Monivong Boulevard (National Road 1)	Phnom Penh
48/49	សាលាច្បាប់	Law University		Monivong Boulevard (National Road 1)	Phnom Penh
50/51	សាលាបឹងត្របែក	Boeung Trabek Highschool		Monivong Boulevard (National Road 1)	Phnom Penh
52/53	ស្ថានីយ៍ឪតុនិយម	Meteology Station		Monivong Boulevard (National Road 1)	Phnom Penh
54/55	ស្ពានអាកាសក្បាល់ថ្នល់	Monivong Flyover	Line 7B	Monivong Boulevard (National Road 1)	Phnom Penh
56/57	ផ្សារច្បារអំពៅ	Chbar Ampov Market		Monivong Boulevard (National Road 1)	Phnom Penh
58/59	ស្ថានីយប្រេងកាល់តិច	Caltex Station		Monivong Boulevard (National Road 1)	Phnom Penh
60/61	វិទ្យាល័យហ៊ុនសែនច្បារអំពៅ	Hun Sen Chbar Ampov Secondary School		Monivong Boulevard (National Road 1)	Phnom Penh
62/63	បូរីប៉េងហួត	Borey Penh Huoth		Monivong Boulevard (National Road 1)	Phnom Penh
64/65	មន្ទីរពេទ្យ ជោរៃ	Cho Rey hospital		Monivong Boulevard (National Road 1)	Phnom Penh
656	ចំណតរថយន្តឧកញ៉ាស៊ុយសុផាន	Oknha Souy Sophan Terminal		Monivong Boulevard (National Road 1)	Phnom Penh

== See also ==
- Phnom Penh City Bus
- Transport in Phnom Penh
- Phnom Penh
