= Ta Khmao BRT station =

Bus station in Phnom Penh, Cambodia

Coordinates: 11.483917°N 104.945068°E

TaKhmao Market ក្រុងតាខ្មៅ

General information
- Location: Phnom Penh
- System: Phnom Penh City Bus
- Line: Line 02
Location

Ta Khmao station is a terminus station on Line 02 of the Phnom Penh BRT bus rapid transit network in Phnom Penh, Cambodia, located on Monivong Boulevard. It is located outside of the TaKhmao Market.

It is 12km from the Choeung Ek Genocidal Centre.

Line B of the Phnom Penh BRT

== See also ==
- Phnom Penh City Bus
- Transport in Phnom Penh
- Line 02 (Phnom Penh Bus Rapid Transit)
