= Mao Tse Toung Boulevard =

Boulevard in Phnom Penh, Cambodia

- Interactive map of Mao Tse Toung Boulevard
- Native name: មហាវិថីម៉ៅសេទុង
- Length: 5,100 m (16,700 ft)
- Coordinates: 11.544262°N 104.927886°E
- From: Chamkar Mon Traffic Light
- To: 10 Makara Flyover

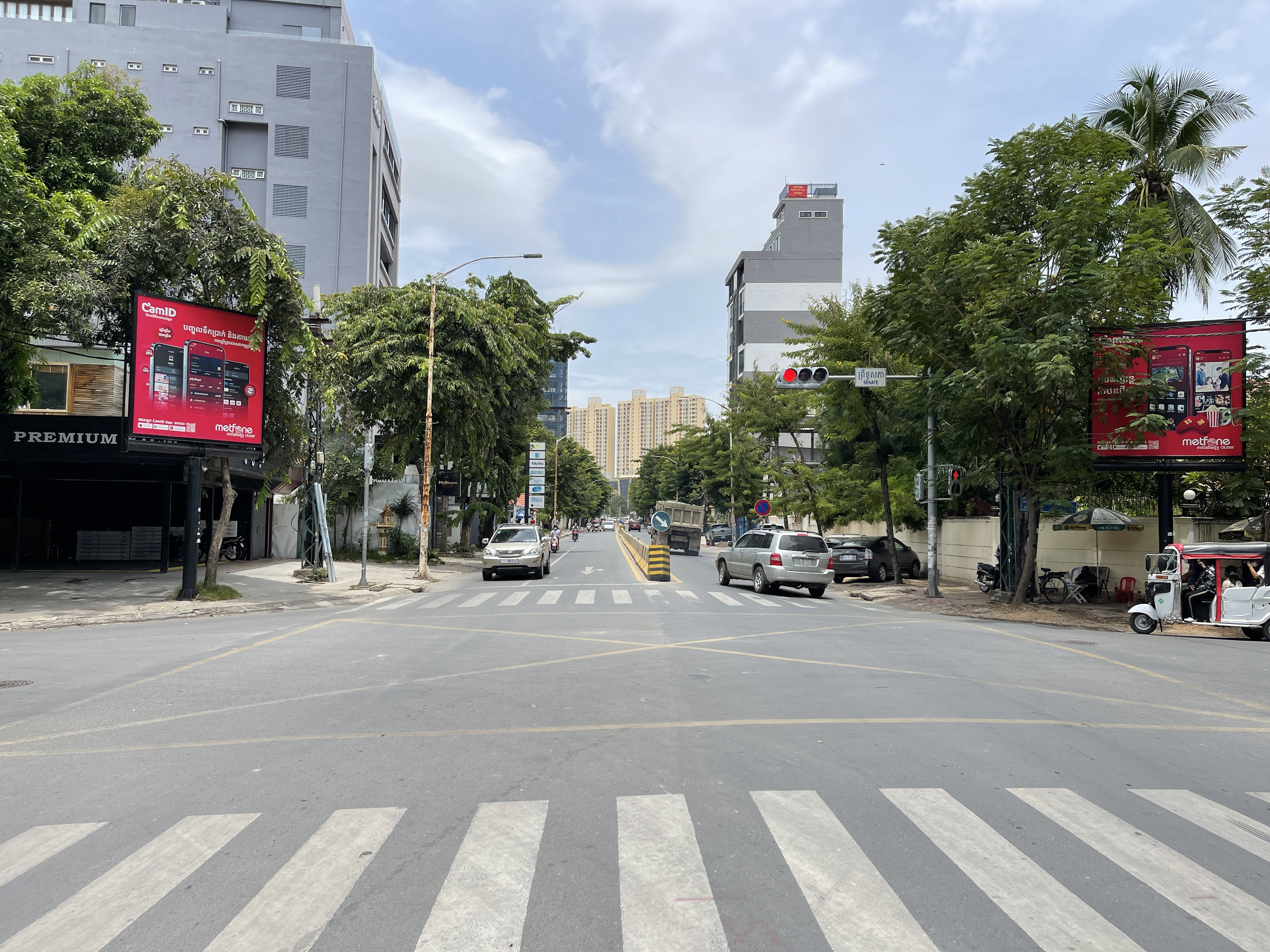
Mao Tse Toung Boulevard at Senate Traffic Light, View to East Side

Mao Tse Toung Boulevard (Khmer: មហាវិថីម៉ៅសេទុង, Môhavĭthei Mau Sétŭng) also called Street 245 (Khmer: ផ្លូវលេខ ២៤៥, Phlov Lékh 245) or Issarak Street (Khmer: ផ្លូវឥស្សរៈ, Phlov Ĕssâreă) is a central boulevard of Phnom Penh connected Norodom Boulevard at Chamkar Mon Traffic Light at East and Ends at 10 Makara Flyover, Russian Federation Boulevard. It is named in honor of Mao Zedong, a former Chairman of the Chinese Communist Party.
