= Kep Chuktema =

Cambodian politician, former Governor of Phnom Penh (born 1951)

His Excellency Kep Chuktema MP
- កែប ជុតិមា

Governor of Phnom Penh
- In office February 2003 – 14 April 2013
- Monarchs: Norodom Sihanouk; Norodom Sihamoni
- Prime Minister: Hun Sen
- Deputy: Pa Socheatvong
- Preceded by: Chea Sophara
- Succeeded by: Pa Socheatvong

Governor of Takéo
- In office 1999–2003
- Monarch: Norodom Sihanouk
- Prime Minister: Hun Sen

Governor of Ratanakiri
- In office 1995–1999
- Monarch: Norodom Sihanouk
- Prime Minister: Hun Sen

Member of Parliament for Phnom Penh
- Incumbent
- Assumed office 23 September 2013

Personal details
- Born: 7 February 1951 (age 75) Phnom Penh, Cambodia, French Indochina
- Party: Cambodian People's Party

Kep Chuktema (Khmer: កែប ជុតិមា; born 7 February 1951) is the former governor and mayor of the Municipality of Phnom Penh.

== Conflicts ==
Under Kep Chuktema's tenure, about 100,000 Phnom Penh residents have been displaced to relocation sites in and around Phnom Penh where access to employment, education healthcare and clean water is often limited. The municipality over the past ten years has failed to tackle the rate at which the population is growing. The city today faces more gridlock with the rise of population growth at 7.5% each year.

In March, Prime Minister Hun Sen expressed concern for the failing state of Phnom Penh’s infrastructure during a meeting with the visiting mayor of Paris. He said the city's expansion had led to electricity shortages, traffic jams, trash problems and an inadequate water supply system.

Chuktema is best remembered for the widely unpopular filling in of Boeung Kak lake and the violent land evictions there and at the Borei Keila community, whose landless residents continue to protest regularly in Phnom Penh.
