= Pa Socheatvong =

Cambodian politician

Pa Socheatvong MP
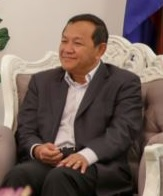
- Socheatvong in 2016

Governor of Phnom Penh
- In office 14 April 2013 – 28 June 2017
- Monarch: Norodom Sihamoni
- Prime Minister: Hun Sen
- Preceded by: Kep Chuktema
- Succeeded by: Khuong Sreng

Deputy Governor of Phnom Penh
- In office 2004–2013
- Governor: Kep Chuktema

Deputy Governor of Battambang
- In office 1999–2004

Deputy Governor of Kampong Thom
- In office 1996–1999

Governor of Daun Penh
- In office 1987–1996

Member of Parliament for Phnom Penh
- Incumbent
- Assumed office 5 September 2018
- Majority: 430,569 (72.6%)

Personal details
- Born: 1 July 1957 (age 68) Phnom Penh, Cambodia
- Party: Cambodian People's Party
- Website: phnompenh.gov.kh

Pa Socheatvong (Khmer: ប៉ា សុជាតិវង្ស [paː sociətʋɔŋ]; born 1 July 1957) is a Cambodian politician who was the Governor of Phnom Penh from 2013 to 2017. His appointment was confirmed on 14 April 2013 by King Norodom Sihamoni.
