= Sisowath Quay =

Waterfront in Phnom Penh, Cambodia

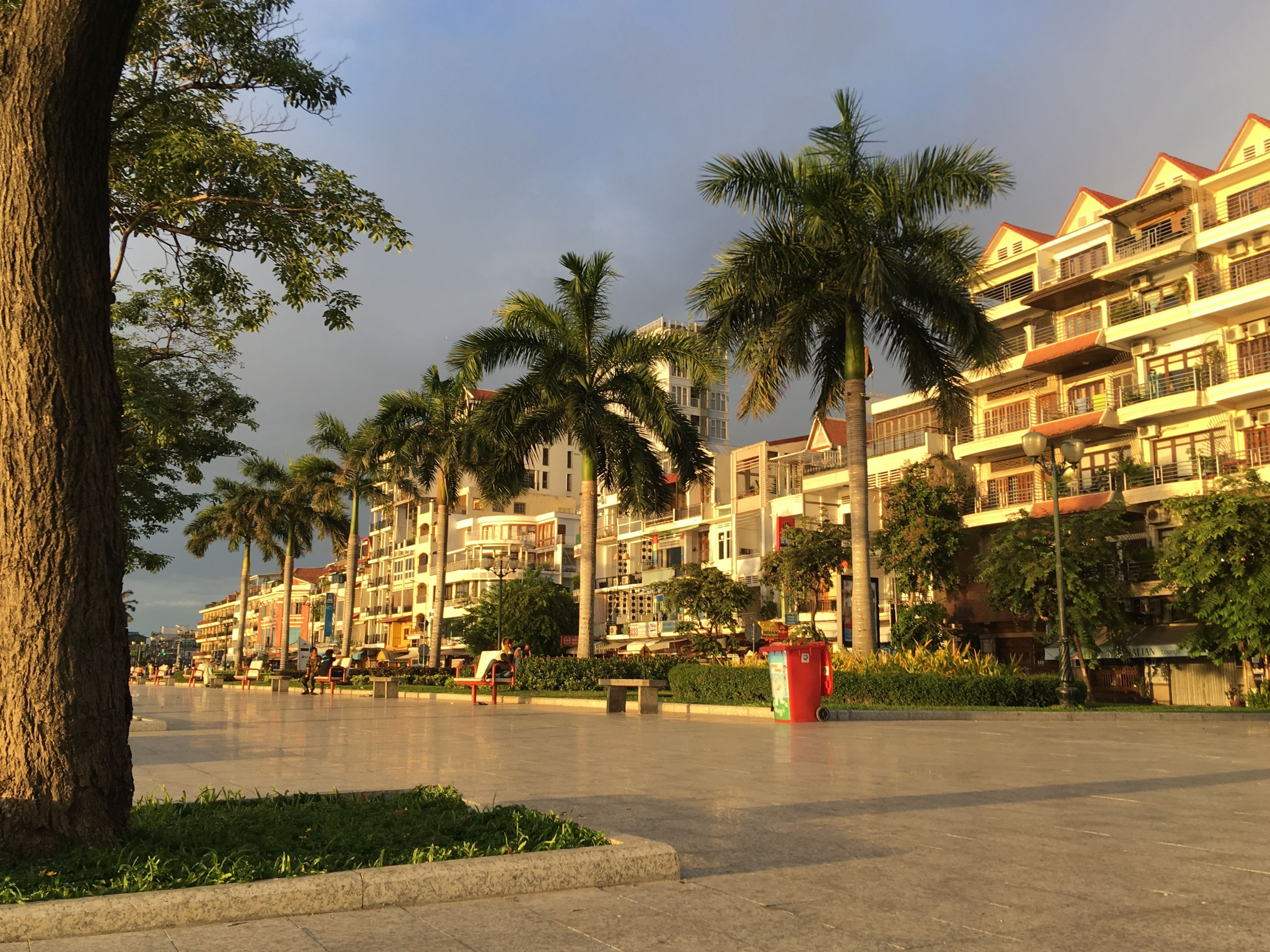
Riverfront

Sisowath Quay (Khmer: តីរវិថីព្រះស៊ីសុវត្ថិ, Preah Sisowath Quay) is a 3-kilometre riverfront strip along the Tonlé Sap River in Phnom Penh, Cambodia.

It is lined with hotels, restaurants, bars, cafes, and shops. The strip is filled with vendors and locals and is popular with tourists.

The portion in front of the palace was used for watching boat races during the Water Festival. The Foreign Correspondents' Club of Cambodia is located along the strip.

The quay is named in honour of King Sisowath of Cambodia.

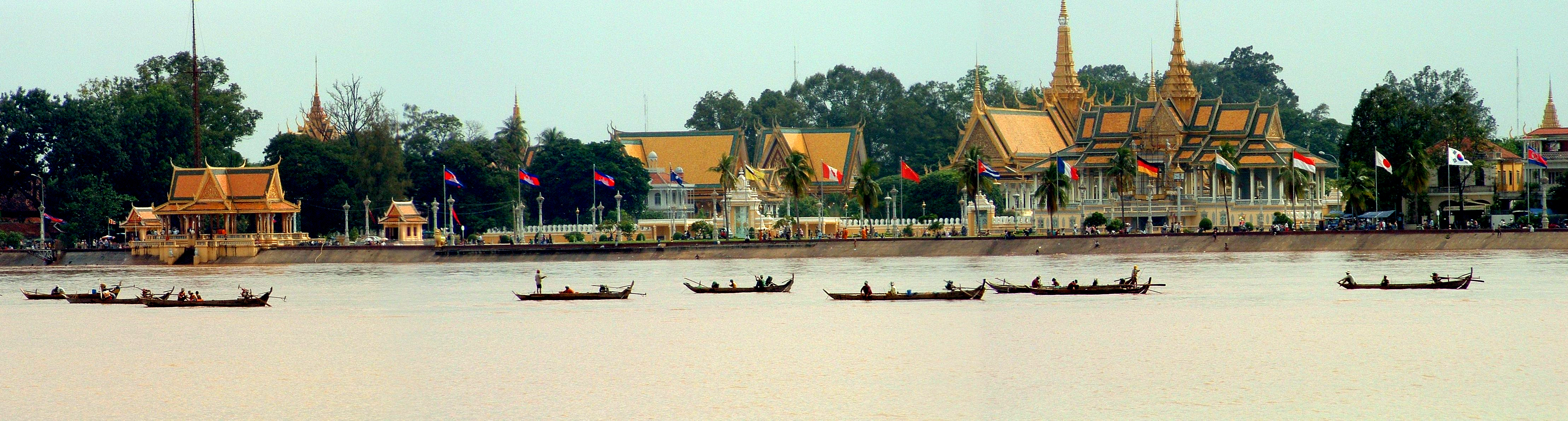
A panorama view of the quay along the Royal Palace
