= Phnom Penh City Bus =

Public bus service in Phnom Penh, Cambodia

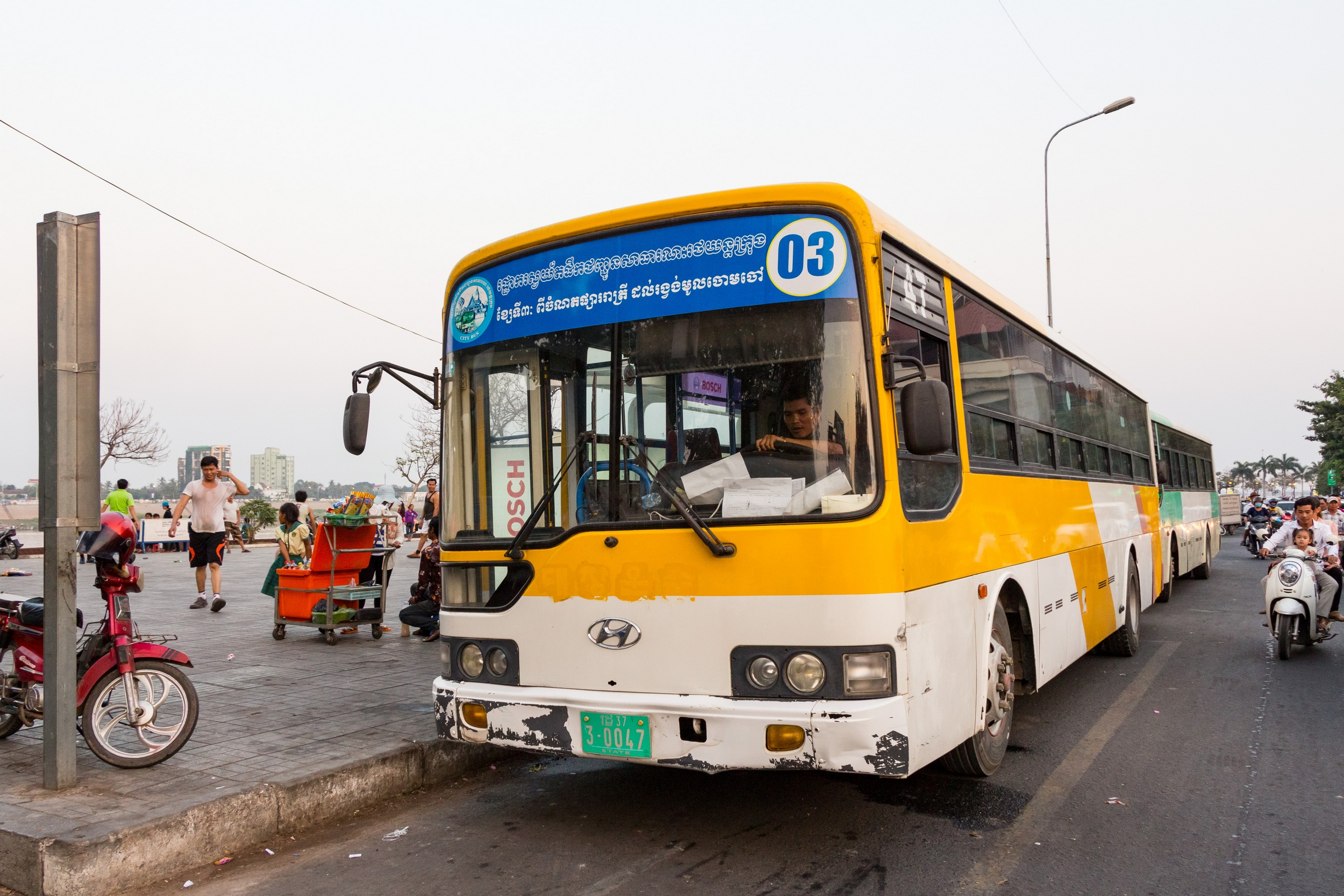

Overview
- Native name: សេវាដឹកជញ្ជូនសាធារណៈរថយន្តក្រុងរាជធានីភ្នំពេញ
- Locale: Phnom Penh, Cambodia
- Transit type: Bus rapid transit
- Number of lines: 22
- Daily ridership: 20 000

Operation
- Began operation: September 2014
- Operators: Phnom Penh City Bus Authority (រដ្ឋាករស្វយ័តដឹកជញ្ជូនសាធារណៈរថយន្តក្រុង (City Bus) រាជធានីភ្នំពេញ), Phnom Penh Municipal Government
- Number of vehicles: 242 buses

Technical
- System length: 164.7 km (estimated)

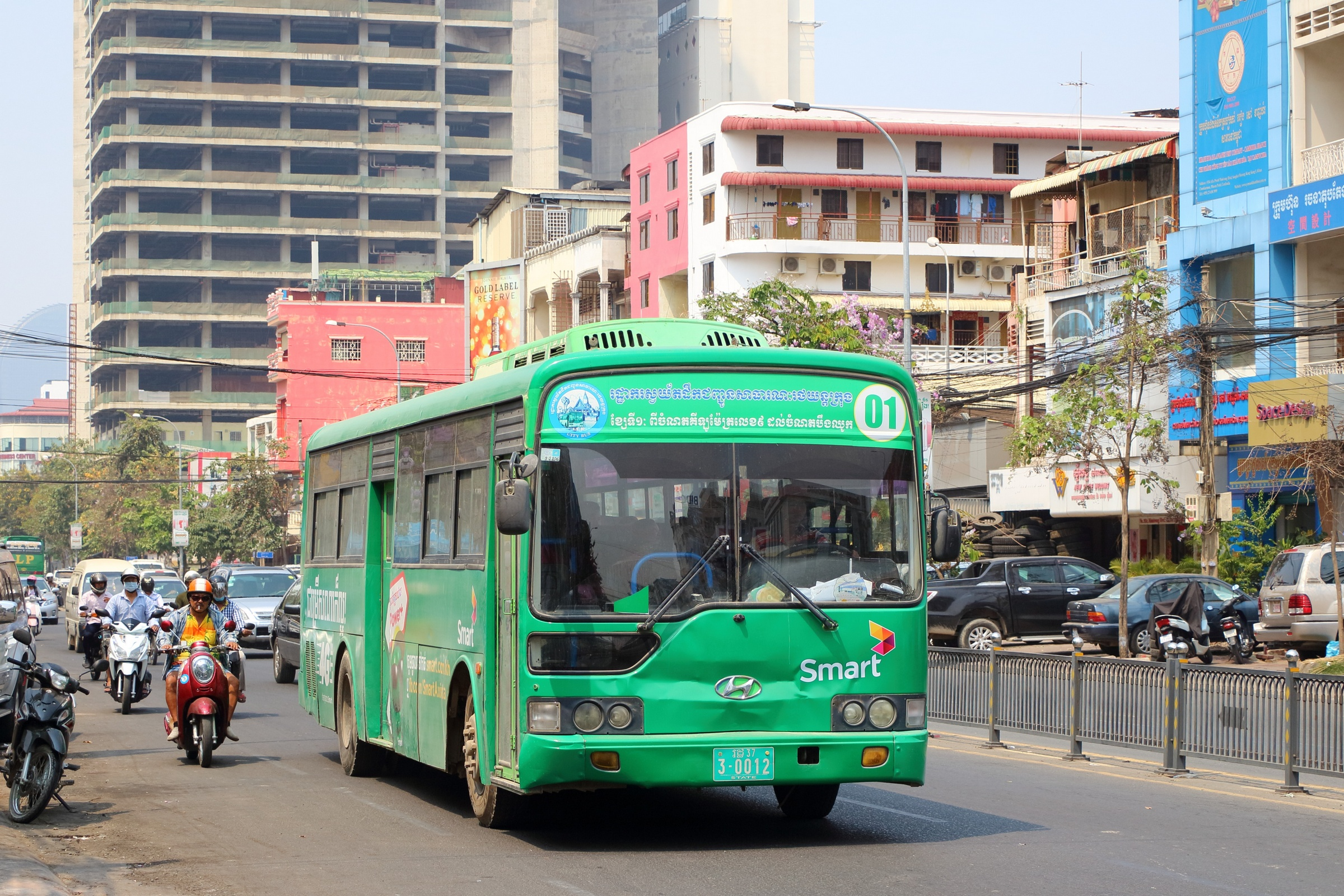
Some of Phnom Penh's buses have been painted in advertising liveries for telecoms company Smart

The Phnom Penh City Bus (Khmer: សេវាដឹកជញ្ជូនសាធារណៈរថយន្តក្រុងរាជធានីភ្នំពេញ) is a municipal public transport system that serves Phnom Penh, the capital of Cambodia. The system opened to the public in September 2014 with 3 lines, other lines have been gradually added over the next several years. As of 2024, 21 lines ran throughout the city. The system covers Prek Pnov (north), Ta Khmao (south), Chbar Ampov (east), and Special Economic Zone (west), there are plans to stretch the network outward.

The fare for the public buses is KHR1,500 (US$0.37) per voyage irrespective of distance. Senior citizens (age over 70), young children (under 1 meter), disabled, monks, teachers, and students travel for free, though they must confirm their identity. Since 1 September 2017, factory workers also travel for free and the exemption has been extended until 1 September 2021. As of 2024, however, the fee exemption was still implemented with no clear due dates.

== History ==
The service is managed by the Phnom Penh Municipal Government. It is the second attempt by City Hall authorities and the Japan International Cooperation Agency (Jica) to launch a public bus service in Cambodia. A similar project 13 years ago was scrapped after just two months due to a lack of passengers.

- October 1, 2018 the City Hall launched 5 new lines on October 1, in addition to the previous 8 lines, giving a total of 13 city bus lines. Alteration and addition are as below:
  - New lines: Line 4C, Line 10, Line 11, Line 12, Line 13.
  - Lines with routes altered: Line 1 changed and separated to 1A, 1B; Line 2; Line 4B; Line 5; Line 6; Line 7; Line 8.

== Lines ==
Line	Terminus	Opened	Distance (km)	Frequency (mins)
1A	Bus Depot ↔ Veal Sbov Bus Station	October 2018	27	15-25
1B	Veal Sbov Bus Station ↔ Prince Manor Resort Station	October 2018	19	15-30
1C	Veal Sbov Bus Station ↔ Borey Peng Huoth Beoung Snor↔ Koh Pich ↔ AEON1 ↔ Chipmong 271 Mega Mall (Loop Route)	February 2024	35.5	20-40
2A	Kouch Kanong Roundabout Bus Station ↔ Prek Samrong Bus Station	October 2018	15.6	10-20
2B	Chak Angrae Leu Bus Station ↔ Borey Sopheak Mongkul Bus Station (Loop Route)	February 2024	13.3	15-35
2C	Kouch Kanong Roundabout Bus Station ↔ Mao Tse Toung Boulevard ↔ City Bus Depot	February 2024	28	15-30
3	Russey Keo Freedom Park Bus Station ↔ Borey Santepheap 2 Bus Station	January 2018	22	15-20
4A	Russey Keo Freedom Park Bus Station ↔ Borey Santepheap 2 Bus Station	January 2018	19.6	15-20
4B	Borey Santepheap 2 Bus Station ↔ CP Factory Ang Snoul ↔ Special Economic Zone Bus Station	October 2018	22	20-30
5	Russey Keo Freedom Park Bus Station ↔ Aeon Mall 2 ↔ Russey Keo Freedom Park Bus Station (Circular route)	October 2018	45	15-30
6	Kouch Kanong Roundabout Bus Station - Sokha Hotel ↔ Bus Depot	October 2018	32.5	15-25
7	City Bus Depot ↔ Street 271 ↔ Veal Sbov Bus Station	October 2018	30	15-30
8	Russey Keo Freedom Park Bus Station ↔ St. 2004 Bus Station	October 2018	14	20-30
9	Borei Santepheap 2 Bus Station ↔ Pong Teuk Bus Station ↔ Special Economic Zone Bus Station (Loop Route)	January 2018	31	15-25
10	St. 2004 Bus Station ↔ Veal Sbov Bus Station	October 2018	18	15-30
11A	Pong Teuk Bus Station ↔ Prey Sar Street ↔ Olympic National Stadium Terminal (Loop route)	June 2023	37	15-30
11B	Prek Kampues Bus Station ↔ Kour Srov Roundabout ↔ Chromus Chruk Steung Meanchey Bus Stop (Loop route)	June 2023	28.6	15-30
11C	Prek Kampues Bus Station ↔ AEON 3 ↔ Chak Angrae Leu Bus Station	Feb 2024	14.5	15-30
12A	Kouch Kanong Roundabout Bus Station ↔ AEON1,Koh Pich ↔ Peng Hout Boueng Snor (Loop route)	June 2023	38.8	15-30
12B	Kouch Kanong Roundabout Bus Station ↔ Chak Angrae Leu Bus Station	June 2023	13	15-30
13A	City Bus Depot ↔ Special Economic Zone Bus Station	June 2023	26.8	15-30
13B	City Bus Depot ↔ Chromus Chruk Steung Meanchey Bus Stop (Loop route)	01 May 2026	38.5	20-35
Airport Express Bus (AEB)	Kouch Kanong Roundabout ↔ Techo International Airport (KTI)	09 Sep 2025	26.8	10-20

=== Line 1A ===
Line 01, Originally established on February 5, 2014, as the first route of the Phnom Penh bus rapid transit network, Line 01 runs on a north-to-southeast axis across the city. The route has since been officially renamed to Line 1A.

Line 1A departs from the Bus Depot located on Win Win Boulevard in Prek Pnov, heading south on National Road 5. The route continues south along Preah Monivong Boulevard (National Highway 1), passes the Kbal Thnal Stop, and crosses the Monivong Bridge. After passing Chbar Ampov Market, it terminates at the Veal Sbov Bus Station.

Line 1A is one of the busiest lines because it connects Phnom Penh to Cbar Ampov.

=== Line 1B ===
Established on October 1, 2018,

Line 1B departs from the Veal Sbov Bus Station. Traveling along National Road 1, the route passes through the Kien Svay area, Koki Market, and the Cambodia Buddhist Center before terminating at the Prince Manor Resort Bus Station.

=== Line 1C ===
Established on February, 2024

Operating as a continuous loop route, Line 1C departs from the Veal Sbov Bus Station. The bus travels through Borey Peng Houth Boeung Snor, continues onward to Koh Norea and Koh Pich, and passes AEON Mall Phnom Penh. It then proceeds along Preah Monivong Boulevard before reaching the Chip Mong 271 Mega Mall bus stop to complete its circuit.

On weekends (Saturdays and Sundays) starting at 6:00 PM, this line undergoes a slight operational adjustment and extends its service hours until 11:30 PM. The evening route is diverted to pass directly near the Walk Street area, and its final terminus is relocated to the Kouch Kanong Roundabout Bus Station.

=== Line 2A ===
Line 02 was originally one of the first three lines established as part of the Phnom Penh bus rapid transit network, operating on a northwest-to-south axis across the city. Due to its success, the service was later divided into three distinct routes: Line 2A, Line 2B, and Line 2C.

Line 2A begins at the Kouch Kanong Roundabout Bus Station and travels past Wat Phnom and Ang Duong Hospital. It continues along Preah Norodom Boulevard past the Independence Monument, heads south on National Road 2 through the Chak Angrae Leu Bus Station, and terminates at the Prek Samraong Bus Station in Takhmao, Kandal Province.

Line 2A is one of the busiest lines because it connects Phnom Penh to Ta Khmao.

=== Line 2B ===
Line 2B was introduced in February 2024.

The route begins at the Chak Angrae Leu Bus Station, travels along National Road 2 through the city of Takhmao, Toul Krasang Primary School and terminates at the Borey Sopheak Mongkul Bus Station.

=== Line 2C ===
Line 2C was introduced in February 2024.

The route begins at the Chak Angrae Leu Bus Station and travels along National Road 2 to Preah Norodom Boulevard. It then turns onto Mao Tse Toung Boulevard, passing by Toul Tumpoung Pagoda, Doeum Kor Market, and Santhormok Primary School. The bus crosses the Techno Sky Bridge, passes the Institute of Technology of Cambodia (ITC), and navigates through the Toul Kork Antenna Roundabout. From there, it proceeds past Camko City and travels along Angkor Boulevard toward the New Doeum Kor Market. Finally, the route follows Kob Srov Road before terminating at the Bus Depot located on Win Win Boulevard in Prek Pnov.

=== Line 03 ===
Line 03 is one of the first 3 lines established as part of the Phnom Penh bus rapid transit network. It runs north to southwest and vice versa in the city with a stop outside Phnom Penh International Airport.

Line 03 starts from Russey Keo Park Terminal, going south on National Road 5, circling Old Stadium Roundabout, going around Wat Phnom, moving south on Norodom Boulevard (National Road 2), around Central Market, traveling west alongside Kampuchea Krom Boulevard, crosses 7 Makara Sky Bridge, going west on Russian Federation Bouelevard, around Chaoum Chaou Circle Garden, moving south on National Road 3, and stops at Borey Santepheap 2 Terminal.

Line 03 is one of the busiest and famous lines in Phnom Penh.

=== Line 4A ===
Line 4A was added in August 2017 along other 7 lines. It runs northeast to southwest and vice versa in the city.

Line 4A starts from Russey Keo Park Terminal, going south on National Road 5, circling Old Stadium Roundabout, going around Wat Phnom, moving south on Norodom Boulevard (National Road 2), around Central Market, traveling southwest alongside Charles de Gaulle Street (217), crosses Kong Hing Stop, cuts across Olympic Water Reservoir Stop, going southwest alongside Monireth Boulevard (217), crossing Steung Mean Chey Sky Bridge, moving west on Veng Sreng Boulevard. turns left at Canadia Water Reservoir Stop, passing Toul Pongror Market, and stops at Borey Santepheap 2 Terminal.

Line 4A is one of the busiest lines because it lies on the factory zones where many factory workers use the city bus to go to work and return home.

=== Line 4B ===
Line 4B was added in August 2017 along other 7 lines. It runs northeast to southwest and vice versa in the city.

Line 4B starts from the Borey Santepheap 2 Bus Station, passes by Toul Pongro Market, and travels along Veng Sreng Boulevard. After going around the Chaom Chau Circle Garden, the route travels west on National Road 4, passing through Kabol and Bek Chan Market, before terminating at the Special Economic Zone Bus Station.

Line 4B is one of the busiest lines because it lies on the factory zones which many factory workers use the city bus to go to work and return home.

=== Line 05 ===
Line 05 was added in August 2017 along other 7 lines. It runs north to southeast and vice versa in the city.

Line 05 operates strictly as a circular loop route. The journey begins and ends at the Russey Keo Freedom Park Bus Station. Along the first half of the circuit, it travels past Wat Phnom and Ang Duong Hospital, continuing down Samdach Pan Street toward Orussey Market. It then navigates along Tep Phan Street, passes the Institute of Technology of Cambodia (ITC) and Toul Kork Primary School, and crosses Street 598 to reach AEON Mall Sen Sok City. To complete the loop, the bus proceeds past Krang Thnong Sangkat Hall, Wat Chhouk Va, Kob Srov Road, and National Road 5, finally arriving back at the Russey Keo Freedom Park Bus Station.

Line 05 is usually busy around the evening period and Sunday due to people going to Aeon Malls.

=== Line 06 ===
Line 06 was added in August 2017 along other 7 lines.

Line 06 departs from the Kouch Kanong Roundabout Bus Station, passing Norton University in Chroy Changvar and the Sokha Hotel. The route continues along National Road 6 up to Prek Leap High School before turning onto Win Win Boulevard. Along this stretch, it passes major landmarks including Phnom Penh Safari, Garden City Water Park, and the Morodok Techo National Stadium, eventually terminating at the Bus Depot Terminal on Win Win Boulevard.

=== Line 07 ===
Line 7 was introduced in August 2017 alongside seven other lines. Originally, the route was designated as Line 7B, operating alongside Line 7A (which traveled to Orussey Market and Tep Phan Road, and currently operates as Line 5). Following network updates, the former Line 7B was officially renamed to Line 7. Operating on a north-south axis through the city, the route departs from the WinWin Bus Stationn locate in Prek Pnov and travels south along Chea Sophara Street (598). It passes under the 7 Makara Sky Bridge, continues south on Yothapol Khemarak Phoumin Boulevard (271), crosses the Steung Meanchey Sky Bridge, passes the Kbal Thnal Stop, crosses the Monivong Bridge, and terminates at the Veal Sbov Bus Station in Chbar Ampov.

=== Line 08 ===
Line 08 was added in August 2017 along other 7 lines. It runs west to east and vice versa in the city.

Line 08 starts from Kilometer 9 Terminal, going north on National Road 5, crosses Prek Pnov Bridge, moving alongside Ly Yongphat Street, travelling south on National Road 6, and ends at Borey Rung Roeung Terminal.

=== Line 09 ===
Line 09 was added in January 2018. It runs east to west and vice versa in the city.

Line 09 begins from Borey Santepheap 2 Terminal, moving south on National Road 3, reaches Vattanac Industrial Park 2 then makes a U-turn, turns left to Prateah Lang Street, and stops at Special Economic Zone Terminal.

=== Line 10 ===
Line 10 was added in October 2018. Line 10 begins from Century Plaza Terminal and stops at Beung Chhouk Terminal

- In June 2023, City Hall updated: Line10: Street 2004 Bus Station to Veal Sbov Bus Station.

=== Line 11A ===
Line 11 was added in October 2018 and separated to 11A,11B in June 2023. Line 11A begins from Pong Teuk Bus Station to Olympic National Stadium Terminal and returns back.

=== Line 11B ===
Line 11B was added to the network in June 2023, replacing the former Line 4C, which was originally introduced in October 2018 but ceased operations following the COVID-19 pandemic in 2021. Operating as a continuous loop route, the bus begins its journey at the Prek Kampues Bus Station, travels past the Kour Srov Roundabout and through Chamkar Doung, and navigates along Preah Monireth Boulevard before reaching the Chromus Chruk Steung Meanchey Bus Stop to complete its circuit.

=== Line 11C ===
Line 11C was added in Feb 2024. Line 11C begin from Prek Kampeus Bus Station - AEON Mean Chey (AEON3) to Chak Angrae Leu Bus Station.

=== Line 12A ===
Line 12 was originally introduced to the network in October 2018 as a circular loop route around Phnom Penh. However, because the former route traveling through Trasak Paem Street, Pasteur Street, and Boeung Keng Kang Market was underperforming, the Phnom Penh City Bus Authority (CBA) decided to reroute it to new locations. During network updates across 2023 and 2024, the service was officially separated into two distinct routes: Line 12A and Line 12B. Line 12A now begins at the Kouch Kanong Roundabout Bus Station, passes by AEON 1, Koh Pich, and Koh Norea, and reaches its terminus at Borey Peng Houth Boeung Snor before returning along the same route.

=== Line 12B ===
Line 12 originally operated as the old Line 13 route starting in October 2018, but it was officially renamed to Line 12B by the Phnom Penh City Bus Authority (CBA) in June 2023. The Line 12B route begins at the Kouch Kanong Roundabout Bus Station, passes by Toul Tumpoung Market, travels along Hun Sen Boulevard, and terminates at the Chak Angrae Leu Bus Station.

=== Line 13A ===
Line 13 was originally added in June 2023 and has now been separated into two distinct routes: Line 13A and Line 13B. Line 13A begins at the Win Win Boulevard Bus Terminal, travels across the Prek Pnov Bridge, continues along Kob Srov Street and National Road 4, and terminates at the Special Economic Zone.

=== Line 13B ===
Line 13B was added to the network in 01 May 2026 when the Phnom Penh City Bus Authority (CBA) separated the original Line 13 into two distinct routes, 13A and 13B, with the new 13B also replacing portions of the former Line 5 route. Operating as a continuous loop, the journey begins at the Bus Depot on Win Win Boulevard and travels across the Prek Pnov Bridge before continuing down Phnom Penh-Hanoi Boulevard. From there, the bus passes over the Phsar Dey Hoy Flyover and navigates through Northbridge Street and Trung Mon Street, eventually heading down Veng Sreng Boulevard and completing its loop at the Chromus Chruk Steung Meanchey Bus Stop.

=== Line AEB ===
The Airport Express Bus (AEB) was officially launched on September 9, 2025, by the Phnom Penh City Bus Authority to provide a direct transit connection between central Phnom Penh and the 4F-class Techo International Airport. The service operates daily from 05:30 to 23:30. The route connects the Kouch Kanong Roundabout Bus Station to Techo International Airport, running primarily along Preah Monivong Boulevard, across the Morodok Techo Flyover, down Samdech Techo Hun Sen Boulevard (60-meter road) and AEON Mall Meanchey.

== See also ==
- Phnom Penh
- Transport in Phnom Penh
- Lists of bus rapid transit systems
