= Foreign Correspondents' Club, Phnom Penh =

Public bar and restaurant in Cambodia

Foreign Correspondents' Club
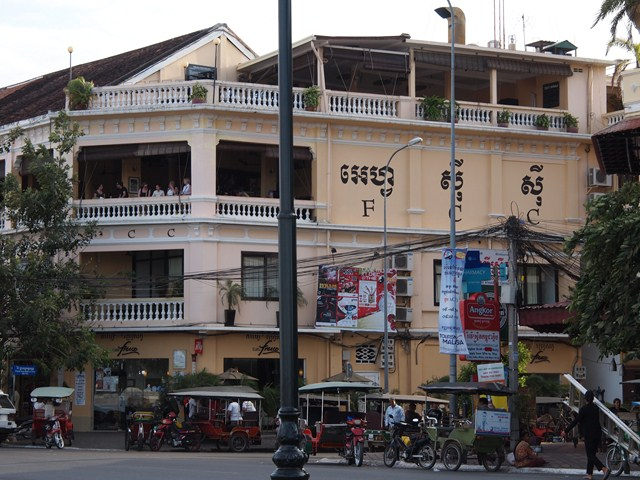
- Foreign Correspondents' Club in 2011

- Location within Cambodia

General information
- Status: Under construction
- Location: 363 Preah Sisowath Quay, Phnom Penh, Cambodia
- Coordinates: 11.566936°N 104.931457°E
- Current tenants: Foreign Correspondents' Club
- Opened: June 1993; 33 years ago

Renovating team
- Architects: Asma Architects (architectural design), Bloom Architecture (interior design)

Other information
- Number of rooms: 9 (previous concept), 35 + 4 "luxury suites" (proposed new concept)

The Foreign Correspondents' Club in Phnom Penh, capital of Cambodia, was a public bar and restaurant located along the Tonle Sap river, not far (upstream) from the confluence with the Mekong river. It is often referred to as "the FCC", or just simply "the F". The actual venue is a three-story colonial-style "Mansion" building with an upstairs terrace vintage-style bar and restaurant, with a rooftop second bar area offering great river views. It closed in late 2018 and has been under renovation since. As of July 2025, the building was still standing with scaffolding around it. Although the future of the establishment is still uncertain, the below outline of a "reimagined" and seemingly two-part concept has been posted on the official FCC Collection website:

"... a significant renovation is currently underway at FCC Phnom Penh, and the reopening date is to be announced in the near future. The reimagined, upscale FCC Phnom Penh, with architectural design by Asma Architecture and interior design by Bloom Architecture, will offer a modern restaurant with Atrium, Sky Bar overlooking the Bassac River, gym, swimming pool, gallery, multi-functional meeting room and 35 new, stylish guest rooms and suites. Four impressive suites, located in the French colonial ‘Mansion’, overlooking the National Museum, will offer landmark luxury in the capital."

The FCC's decor featured photos dating back to the Khmer Rouge invasion of Phnom Penh, taken by war correspondents who used to meet at the FCC.

The FCC in Phnom Penh was not a private club, like other Foreign Correspondents' Clubs around the world, but a for-profit restaurant open to the public, although members from reciprocal clubs (like the FCC Hong Kong) got a 10% discount on food and drinks. The FCC in Phnom Penh had nine hotel rooms.

They also have a hotel, restaurant and bar in Siem Reap. Recently they have opened a restaurant branch in Techo International Airport.

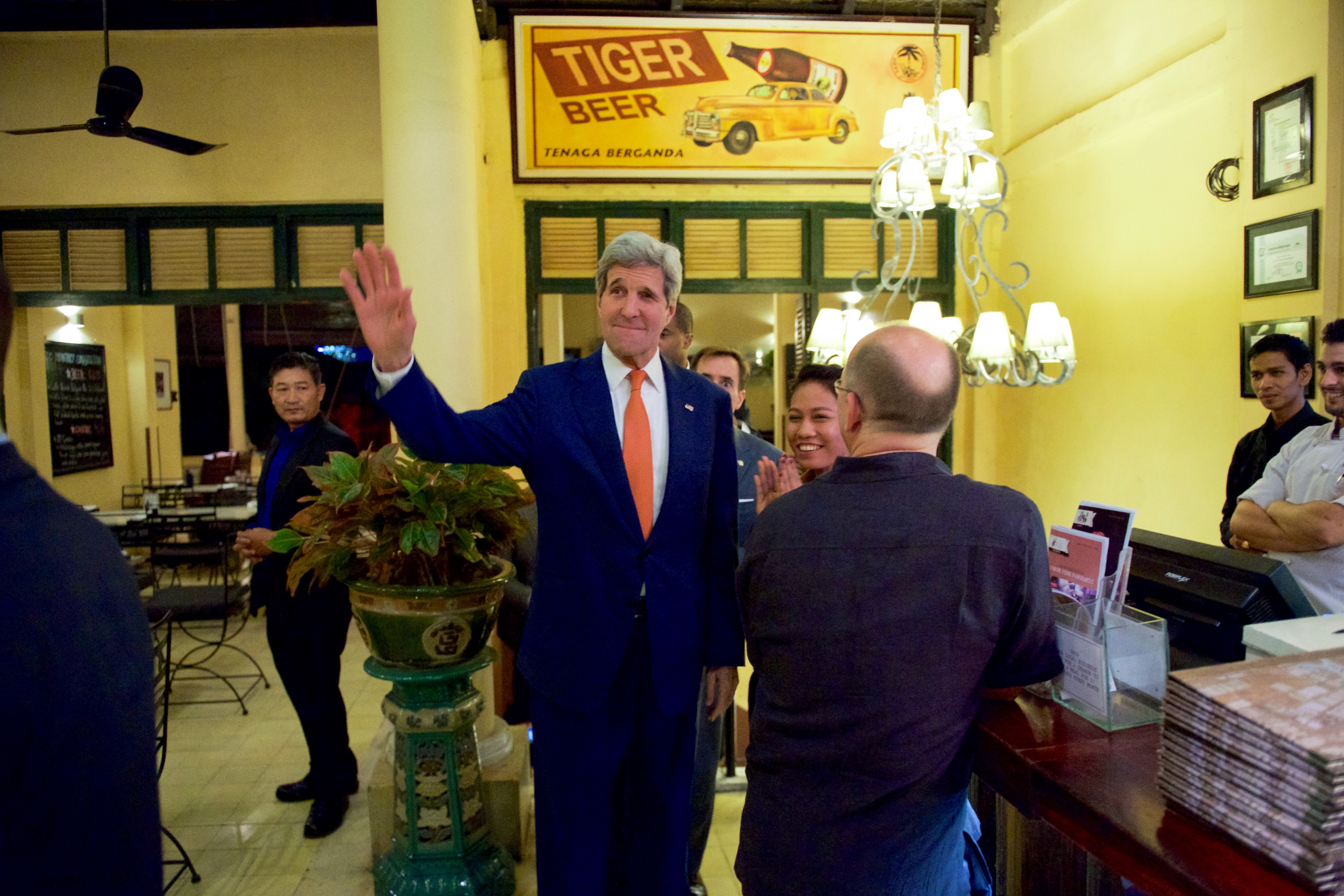
Secretary John Kerry Visits the Foreign Correspondents Club in January 2016 Before Series of Meetings With Cambodian Leaders

The Grand Tour visited here during their season 4 episode "Seamen"
