= National Highway 2 (Cambodia) =

National Highway in Cambodia

National Highway 2

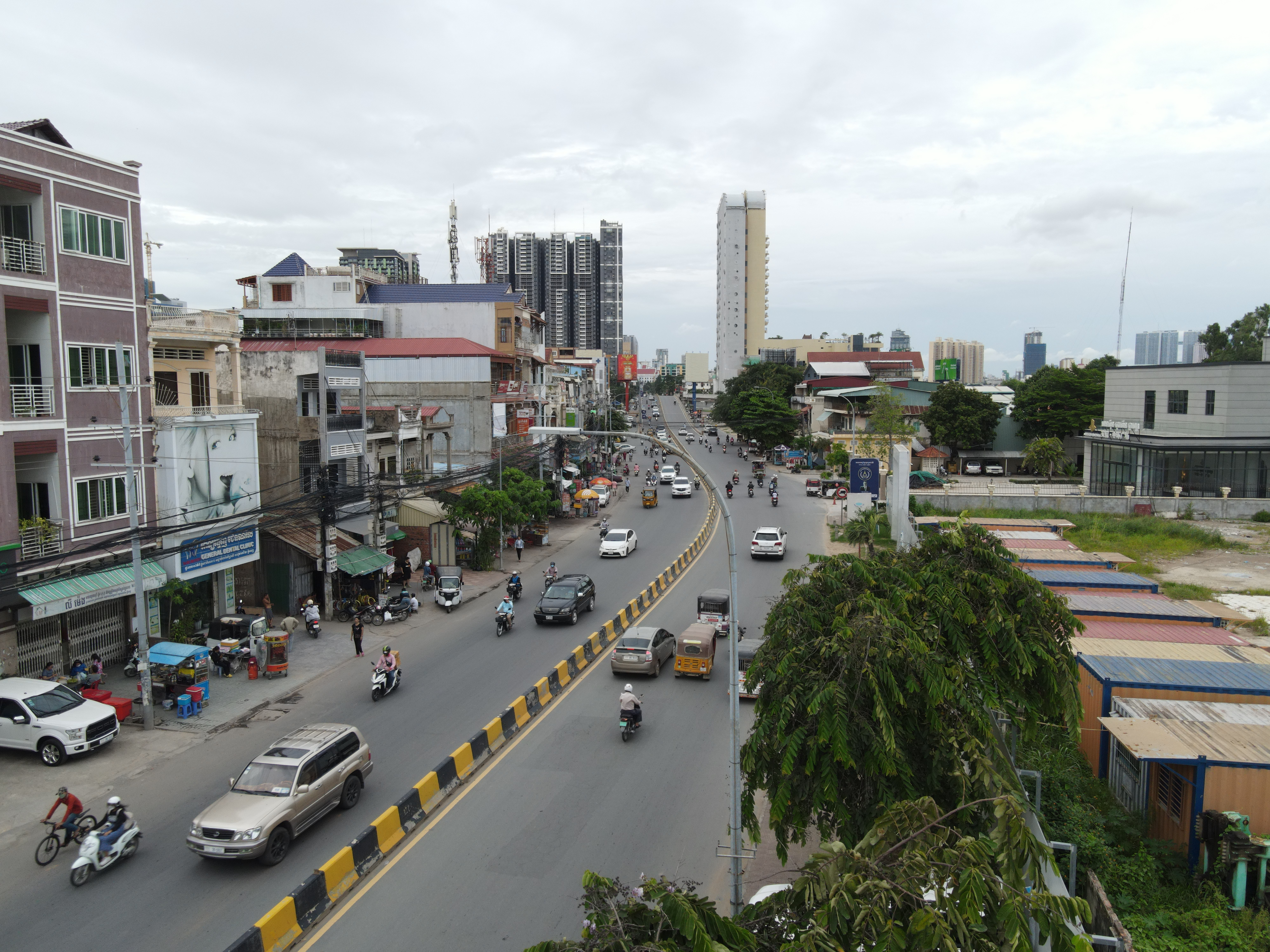
- National Highway 2 at Kbal Thnol

Location
- Country: Cambodia

Highway system
- Transport in Cambodia

National Highway 2 — NH2, or National Road No.2 (10002), is one of the national highways of Cambodia.

With a length of 120.60 km (74.94 mi), it connects the capital of Phnom Penh with Vietnam.

NH2 leads south out of Phnom Penh, through Kandal Province, and enters the Tram Kak District of Takéo Province. It continues south through Kiri Vong District in the province, where it veers due east and meets the border with Vietnam.

== Images ==
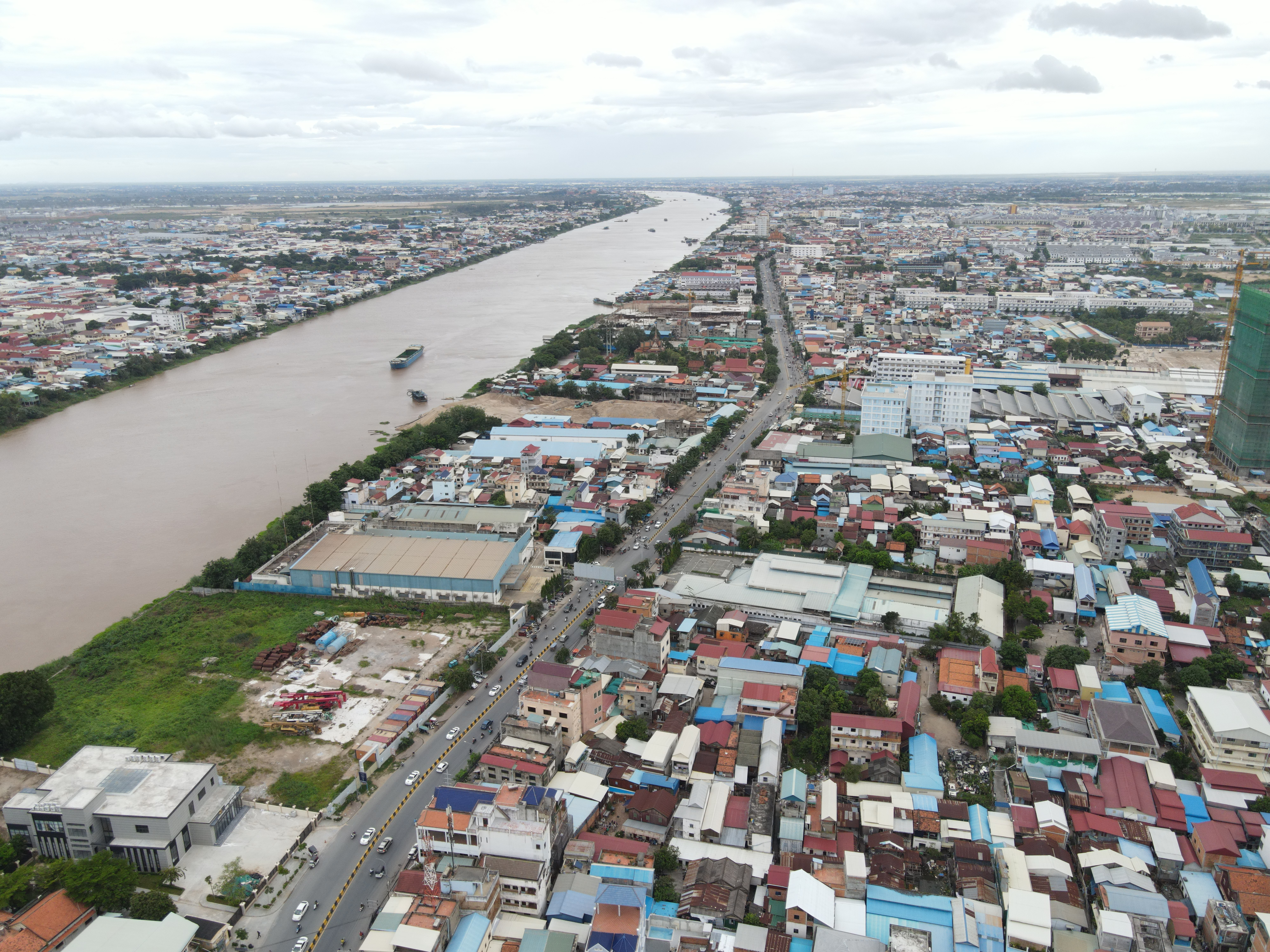
National Highway 2 and Bassac River View from Kbal Thnol, Chak Angre

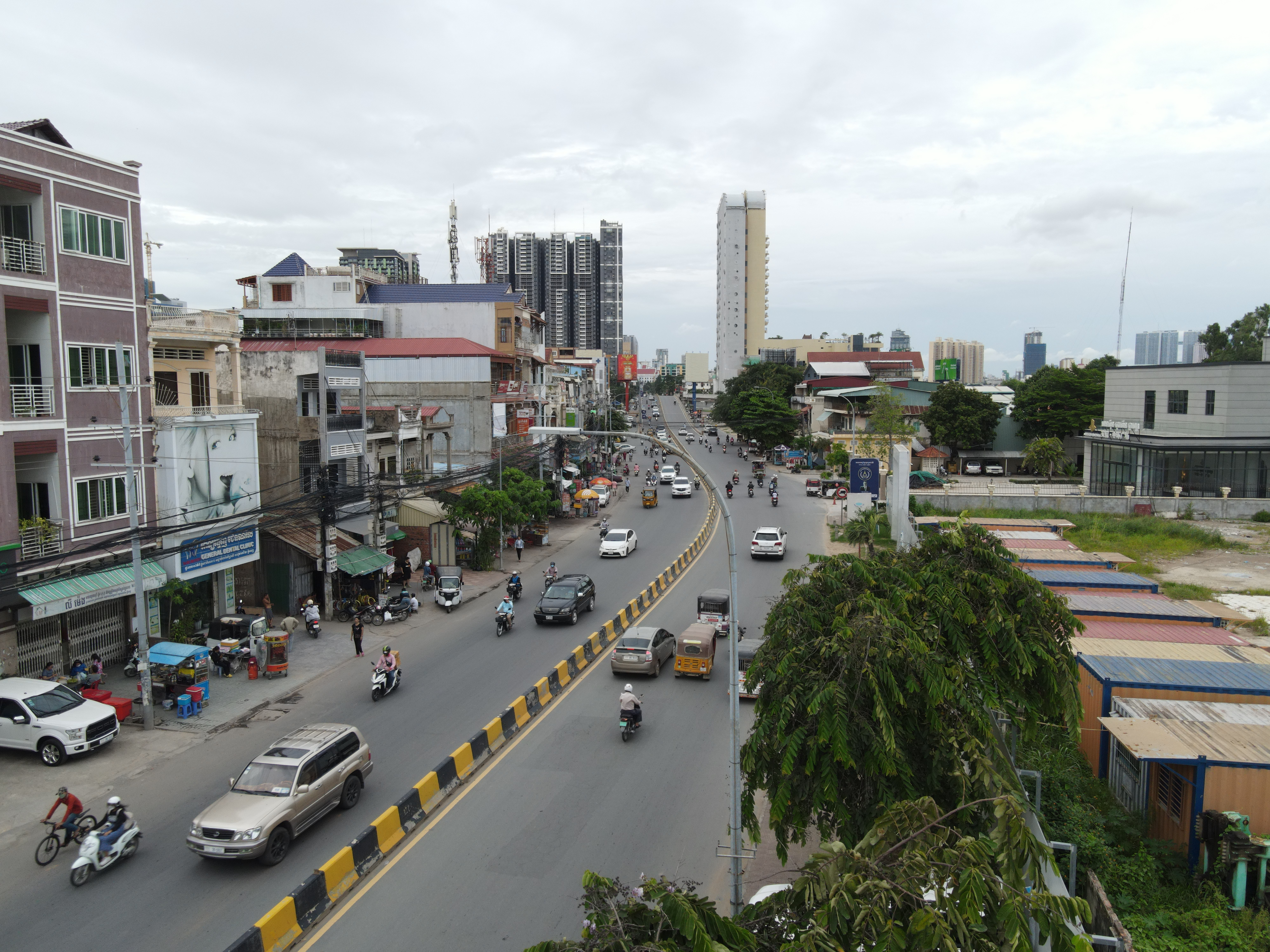
National Highway 2 at Kbal Thnol
