= Norodom Boulevard =

Boulevard in Phnom Penh, Cambodia

- Interactive map of Norodom Boulevard
- Native name: មហាវិថីព្រះនរោត្តម
- Length: 5,900 m (19,400 ft)
- Width: 70 m (230 ft)
- Coordinates: 11.55°N 104.92°E
- From: Monivong Bridge
- To: Wat Phnom

Norodom Boulevard or Preah Norodom Boulevard (Khmer: មហាវិថីព្រះនរោត្តម, Mohavithei Preah Noroutdam [mɔ.haː.ʋi.tʰəj prĕəh nɔ.roːt.ɗɑm]), also called Street 41 (Khmer: ផ្លូវលេខ៤១, Phlov Lek 41), is a major boulevard in Cambodia and one of Phnom Penh's oldest arterial roads. It was named after King Norodom. It connects with Monivong Bridge in the south-east of the city at the Bassac River and joins with the north of the city at Wat Phnom.

== History ==
During the French protectorate of Cambodia, it was called Boulevard Doudart de Lagrée, in honor of Ernest Doudart de Lagrée, the corvette captain is the architect of the transfer of the capital from Oudong to Phnom Penh.

During the Khmer Rouge rule, the building of the Central Bank of Cambodia was blown up, and rebuilt in 1991 in its previous location on Norodom Boulevard (then still Tou Samouth Boulevard).

In July 1988, as the Vietnamese commanders left Phnom Penh, Khmer citizens holding small Vietnamese and Cambodian flags sat on the curbs of Tou Samouth Boulevard, where the old U.S. Embassy building stands, to wave at the passing formations.

The Communist Party of Kampuchea had renamed the boulevard in honor of Tou Samouth, and it kept that name until 1995, when it was named in honor of King Norodom, in a major renaming campaign during which the names of Phnom Penh streets linked to communist figures were changed to names commemorating Khmer royalty and history of Cambodia.

By 2018, along Norodom Boulevard, a non-operational new traffic light obscured the view of the old traffic lights, which still function as normal but cannot be seen by drivers.

== Description ==
It crosses with the east–west Sihanouk Boulevard at Independence Monument and near Wat Langka.

It also crosses the Russian Federation Boulevard which goes from Norodom Boulevard toward Phnom Penh International Airport.

The International School of Phnom Penh and Lycée Sisowath are located on the boulevard, as are the embassies of Singapore and Myanmar.

In 2020, the new headquarters of the Cambodian People's Party were inaugurated on Norodom Boulevard.

== Public transport ==
In July 2017, in a bid to ease traffic congestion, the new Phnom Penh governor on Friday announced that Norodom Boulevard was one of the 11 main roads to be freed of vendors.

Illegal parking and street vendors that encroach the pavements alongside Preah Norodom Boulevard between Wat Phnom and Independence Monument continue to cause serious disruptions because Preah Norodom Boulevard is the main road which national and international delegates travel on and its pavements are equipped with special luxury tiles for pedestrians and people with disabilities to use.

Two bus routes use the boulevard. Line 2 runs southeast from the Chroy Changvar roundabout along France Street (47) towards Wat Phnom, turns onto Norodom Boulevard, continues to National Road 2, and stops at the base of the Takhmao bridge. Line 3 runs south from the Russey Keo Garden Bus Terminal along National Road 5, onto Sisowath Quay, turns right on Street 106, left on Norodom Boulevard, right on Street 130 to Central Market, then takes Kampuchea Krom Street (128) west, onto Russian Federation Boulevard, turns left at the Chaom Chao roundabout onto National Road 3 and turns left towards the Borey Santepheap II Bus Terminal.

== Popular culture ==
Produced in 1988, Czechoslovak drama film Devět kruhů pekla (English: Nine Circles of Hell) pictures the Khmer Rouge extras advance on Norodom Boulevard.

== Images ==
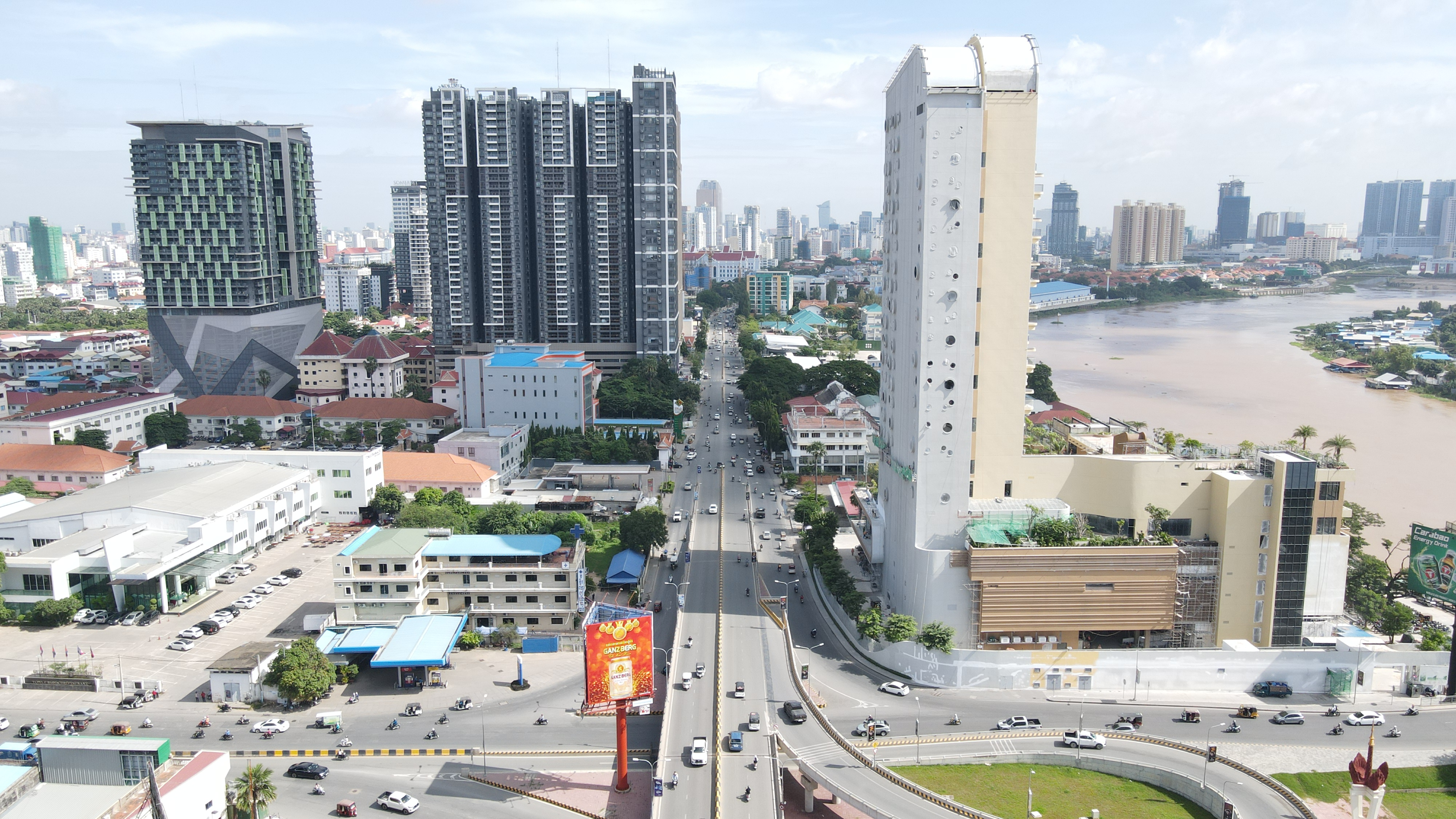
Preah Norodom Boulevard View from Kbal Thnol Overpass

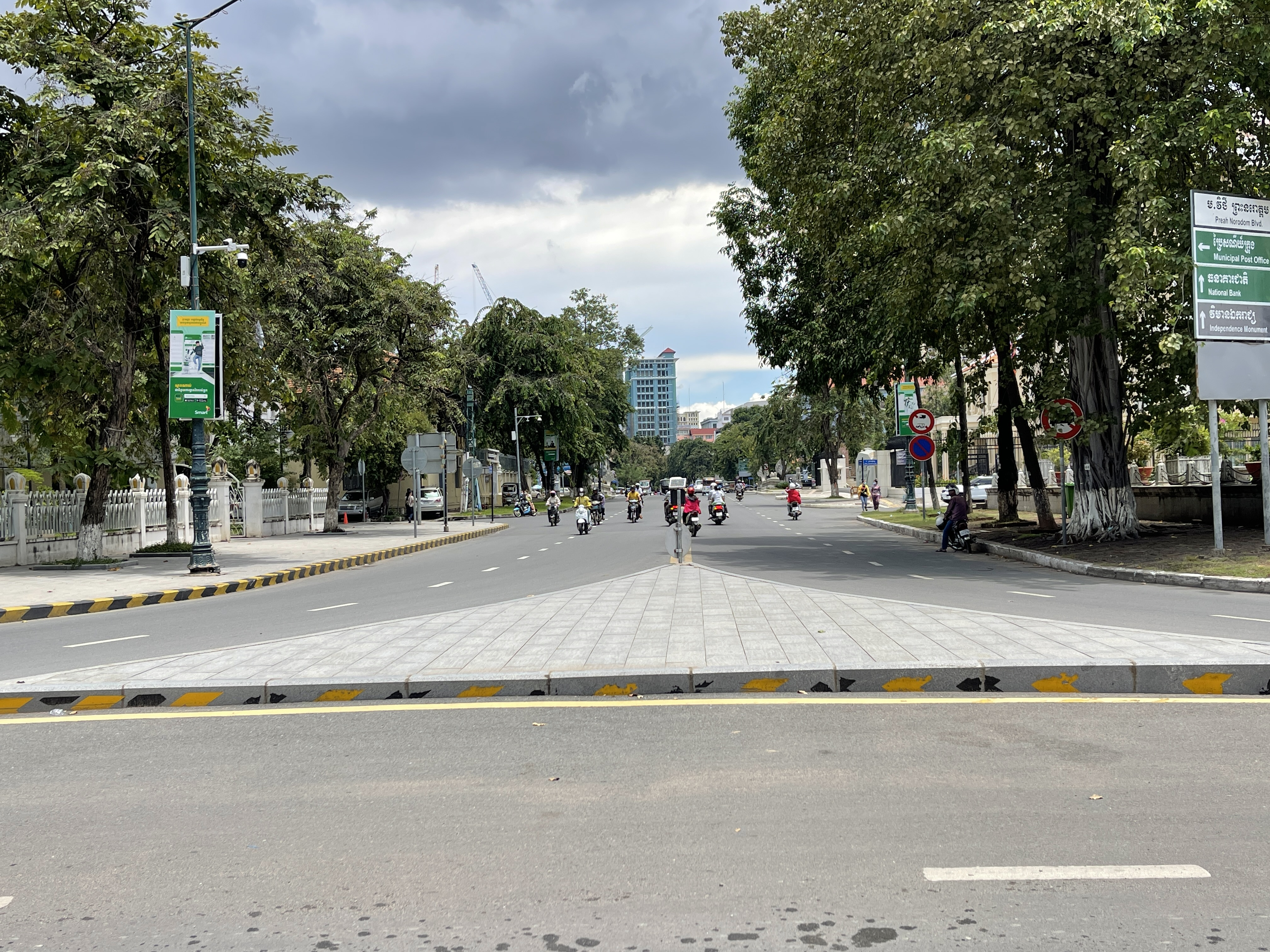
Preah Norodom Blvd from Wat Phnom 2022

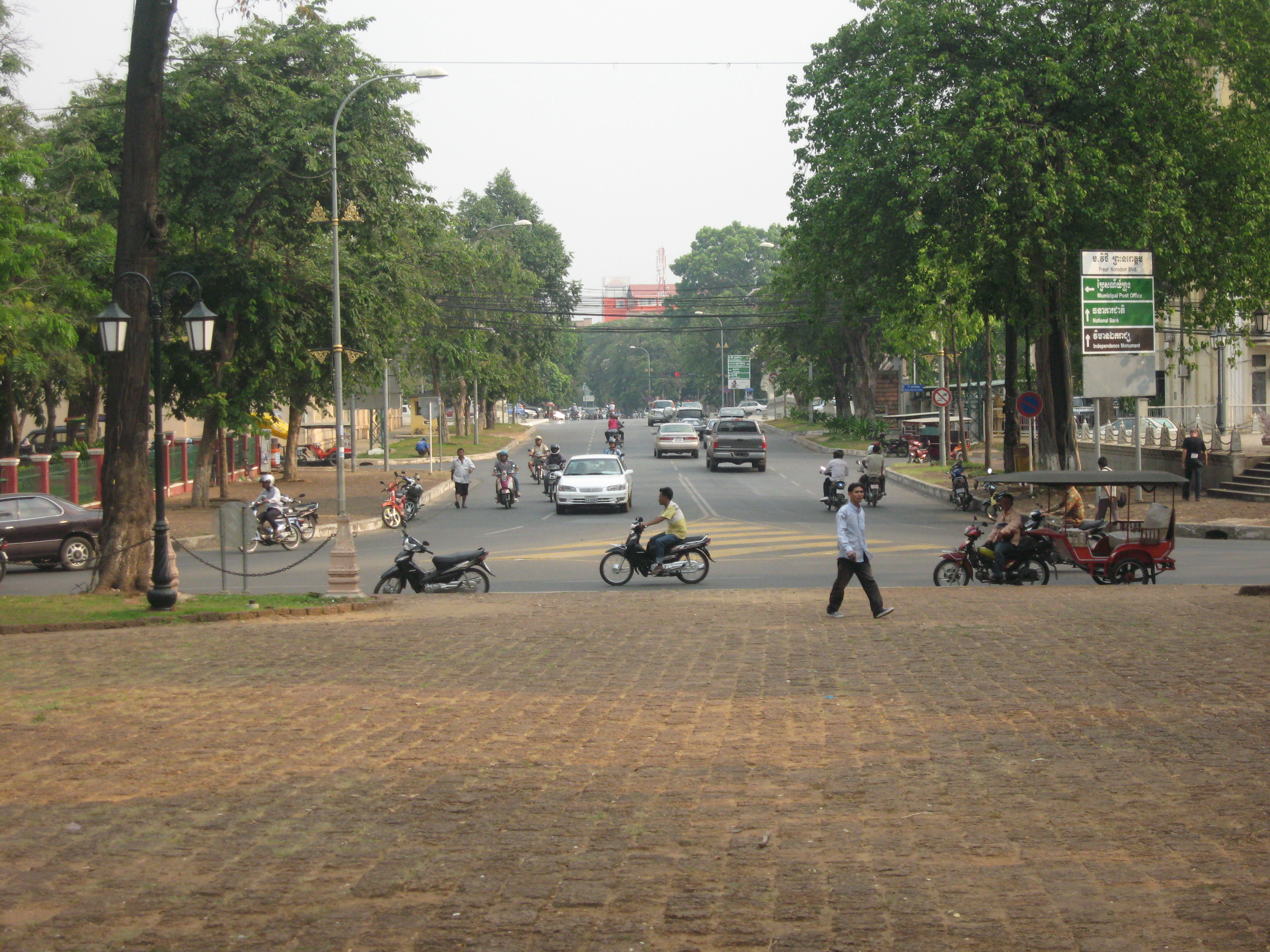
Norodom Boulevard viewed from Wat Phnom 2011

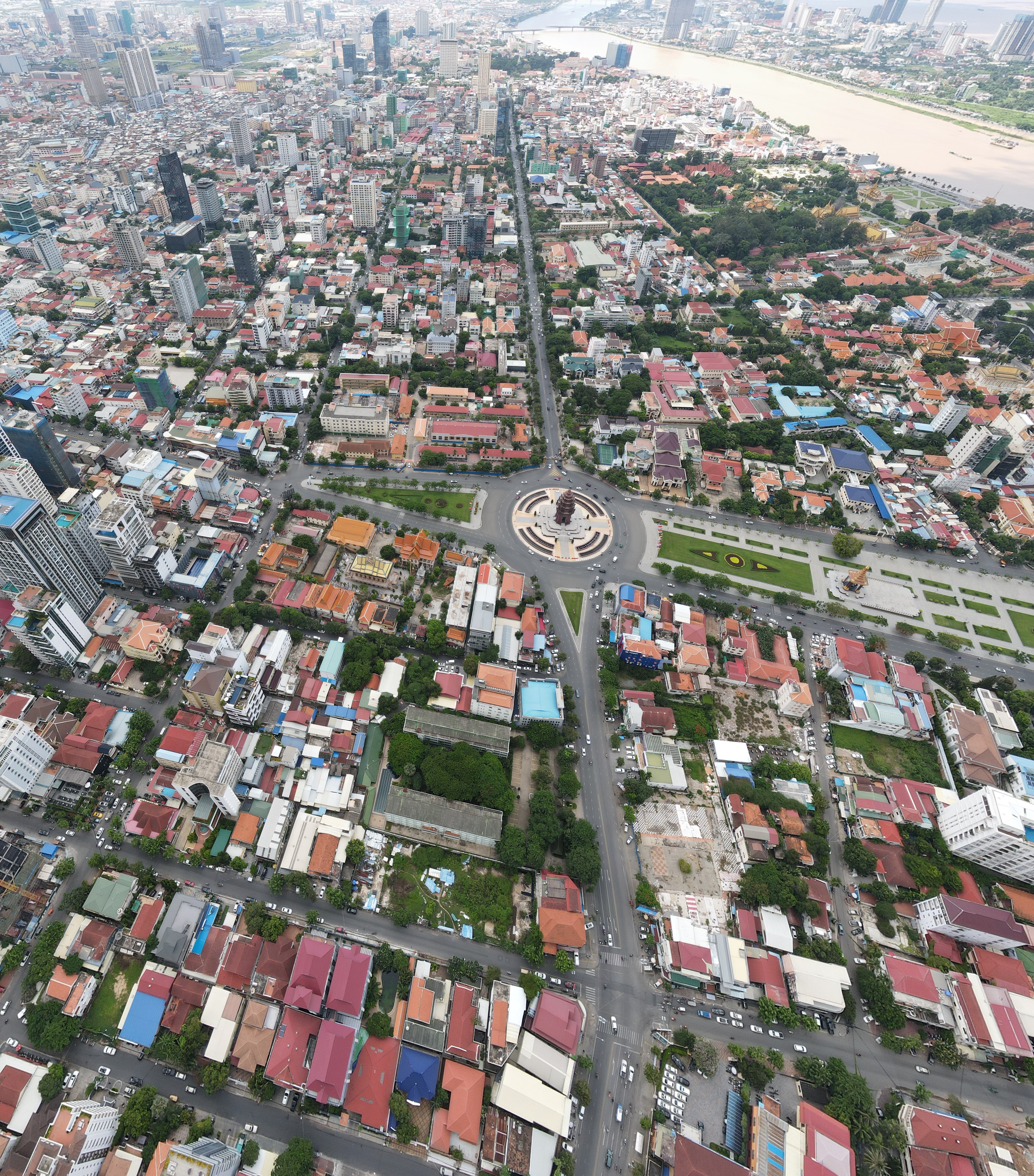
Aerial View of Preah Norodom Blvd and Independence Monument, Viewed From South to North Side
