= Transport in Phnom Penh =

The city of Phnom Penh is served by multiple transport systems including public buses, private taxis and ride-hailing via mobile apps.

Phnom Penh is connected to the rest of the country through the national roads as well as by domestic flights to and from Phnom Penh International Airport.

The Municipality of Phnom Penh is largely responsible for overseeing the public transport in Phnom Penh.

== Roads ==
Road-based transport is the primary source of transport in Phnom Penh. It consists of taxis, tuk tuks and private transportation.

== Buses ==
Phnom Penh City Bus
- logo of the Phnom Penh City Bus

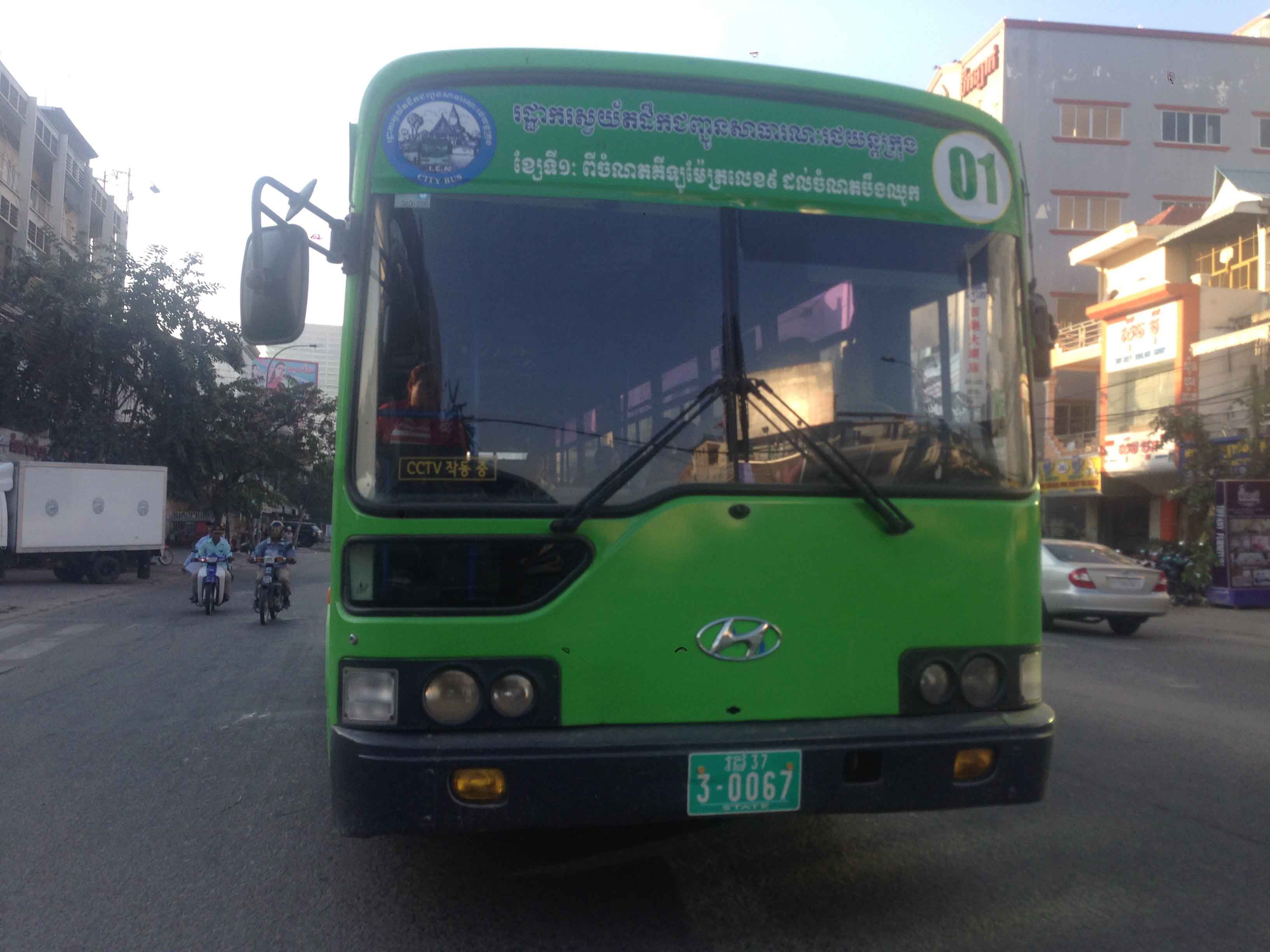

Overview
- Locale: Phnom Penh, Cambodia
- Transit type: bus rapid transit
- Number of lines: 21
- Daily ridership: 7000

Operation
- Began operation: September 2014
- Operator: Phnom Penh Municipal Government
- Number of vehicles: 235 buses

As of 2020, the public bus transportation in Phnom Penh consists of 17 lines:

Line	Terminus	Opened	Distance (km)	Frequency (mins)
1A	Bus Depot ↔ Veal Sbov Bus Station	October 2018	27	15-25
1B	Veal Sbov Bus Station ↔ Prince Manor Resort Station	October 2018	19	15-30
1C	Veal Sbov Bus Station ↔ Borey Peng Huoth Beoung Snor↔ Koh Pich ↔ AEON1 ↔ Chipmong 271 Mega Mall (Loop Route)	February 2024	35.5	20-40
2A	Kouch Kanong Roundabout Bus Station ↔ Prek Samrong Bus Station	October 2018	15.6	10-20
2B	Chak Angrae Leu Bus Station ↔ Borey Sopheak Mongkul Bus Station (Loop Route)	February 2024	13.3	15-35
2C	Kouch Kanong Roundabout Bus Station ↔ Mao Tse Toung Boulevard ↔ City Bus Depot	February 2024	28	15-30
3	Russey Keo Freedom Park Bus Station ↔ Borey Santepheap 2 Bus Station	January 2018	22	15-20
4A	Russey Keo Freedom Park Bus Station ↔ Borey Santepheap 2 Bus Station	January 2018	19.6	15-20
4B	Borey Santepheap 2 Bus Station ↔ CP Factory Ang Snoul ↔ Special Economic Zone Bus Station	October 2018	22	20-30
5	Russey Keo Freedom Park Bus Station ↔ Aeon Mall 2 ↔ Russey Keo Freedom Park Bus Station (Circular route)	October 2018	45	15-30
6	Kouch Kanong Roundabout Bus Station - Sokha Hotel ↔ Bus Depot	October 2018	32.5	15-25
7	City Bus Depot ↔ Street 271 ↔ Veal Sbov Bus Station	October 2018	30	15-30
8	Russey Keo Freedom Park Bus Station ↔ St. 2004 Bus Station	October 2018	14	20-30
9	Borei Santepheap 2 Bus Station ↔ Pong Teuk Bus Station ↔ Special Economic Zone Bus Station (Loop Route)	January 2018	31	15-25
10	St. 2004 Bus Station ↔ Veal Sbov Bus Station	October 2018	18	15-30
11A	Pong Teuk Bus Station ↔ Prey Sar Street ↔ Olympic National Stadium Terminal (Loop route)	June 2023	37	15-30
11B	Prek Kampues Bus Station ↔ Kour Srov Roundabout ↔ Chromus Chruk Steung Meanchey Bus Stop (Loop route)	June 2023	28.6	15-30
11C	Prek Kampues Bus Station ↔ AEON 3 ↔ Chak Angrae Leu Bus Station	Feb 2024	14.5	15-30
12A	Kouch Kanong Roundabout Bus Station ↔ AEON1,Koh Pich ↔ Peng Hout Boueng Snor (Loop route)	June 2023	38.8	15-30
12B	Kouch Kanong Roundabout Bus Station ↔ Chak Angrae Leu Bus Station	June 2023	13	15-30
13A	City Bus Depot ↔ Special Economic Zone Bus Station	June 2023	26.8	15-30
13B	City Bus Depot ↔ Chromus Chruk Steung Meanchey Bus Stop (Loop route)	01 May 2026	38.5	20-35
Airport Express Bus (AEB)	Kouch Kanong Roundabout ↔ Techo International Airport (KTI)	09 Sep 2025	26.8	10-20

Since 2014, air conditioned buses have run along three main bus routes across the city, managed by the Phnom Penh Municipal Government and formerly sponsored by the Japanese International Cooperation Agency. Line A travels north/south along Monivong Boulevard going around Wat Phnom (stop 21), the Central Market (stop 30) and near the Tuol Sleng Genocide Museum (Stop 41), Olympic Stadium (stop 37), the Royal Palace and the National Museum of Cambodia (stop 35). Line B serves the western side along Mao Tse Tung Boulevard, going much further south to Ta Khmao, capital of the Kandal Province near the Choeung Ek Genocidal Centre. Line C goes east/west Phnom Penh along the Russian Confederation Boulevard to Phnom Penh International Airport BRT station. The fare for the public buses is KHR1500 per voyage irrespective of distance. Students and senior citizens travel free as of 2015.

Public transport operates between 5:30am to 8pm.

Phnom Penh City Bus will be use BYD electric bus that are currently in operational test.

== Taxis ==
Taxis appear in the form of cars, motorcycles, and tuk-tuk. Motorcycle taxis are a common and unregulated form of public transport, common in Phnom Penh.

Ride-hailing via mobile apps has become a popular mean of transportation within Phnom Penh. After acquiring Uber, Grab has become the largest ride-hailing service in Phnom Penh and Siem Reap, offering car, tuktuk and motorbike services. A local based ride-hailing app, PassApp is also widely used in Phnom Penh.

== Rail ==
The only form of rail transport in Phnom Penh was the short-lived airport shuttle train operated by Royal Railway. The journey from Phnom Penh International Airport to the city centre, and vice versa took under 40 minutes. The airport train first began service on 10 April 2018 and ceased in 2020.

In 2016, the Cambodian government announced that they were getting assistance from Japan International Cooperation Agency (JICA) to conduct a feasibility study on an AGT system in Phnom Penh. The study began in 2017 and was completed and submitted to the Ministry of Works and Public Transport in 2019.

Separately, in 2019, the government has also awarded contracts to two Chinese firms to conduct feasibility studies on both a metro and a light rail system.

== Airports ==
Phnom Penh is served by Phnom Penh International Airport, the largest airport in terms of land area in Cambodia.

A new larger international airport, Techo Takhmao International Airport, is being built at Kandal province, south of Phnom Penh and will replace the existing airport once fully completed.

== See also ==
- Phnom Penh City Bus
- Transport in Cambodia
- Rail transport in Cambodia
- Phnom Penh International Airport
