= List of governors of Phnom Penh =

Governor of Phnom Penh
- អភិបាលរាជធានីភ្នំពេញ
- Incumbent; Khuong Sreng since 28 June 2018
- Style: His Excellency
- Status: Chief Executive
- Seat: Phnom Penh
- Nominator: Prime Minister
- Appointer: Monarch by royal decree
- Term length: 5 years
- Website: phnompenh.gov.kh

The governor of Phnom Penh (Khmer: អភិបាលរាជធានីភ្នំពេញ) is the chief executive of Phnom Penh, the capital of Cambodia. The governor is also the head of the Phnom Penh Capital Hall and is appointed to a term of four to five years. The current governor is Khuong Sreng, who was appointed on 16 June 2018.

== List of governors ==
This is a list of governors of Phnom Penh since 1941.

=== Between 1941 and 1970 ===
Governor	Term in office	Time in office
Nhiek Tioulong (1908-1996)	?	?
Meach Kun	?	?
Tep Phan	?	?
Un Tro Moch	?	?
Y Tuy	?	?

=== Between 1970 and 1975 ===
Governor	Term in office	Time in office
Ung Heam	?	?
Chhay Kim Hong	?	?
Hou Hang Sin	?	?

=== Since 1979 ===
Portrait	Name	In office		Party
Portrait	Name	From	To	Party
	Khang Sarin	1979	1980	KPRP
	Chan Ven	1980	1982	KPRP
	Keo Chanda	1982	1985	KPRP
	Thong Khon (b. 1951)	1985	1990	KPRP
	Hok Lundy (1950–2008)	1990	1992	CPP
	Sim Ka	1992	1993	CPP
	Chhim Siek Leng (b. 1940)	1993	1998	FUNCINPEC
	Chea Sophara (b. 1953)	1998	2003	CPP
	Kep Chuktema (b. 1951)	February 2003	14 April 2013	CPP
	Pa Socheatvong (b. 1957)	14 April 2013	28 June 2018	CPP
	Khuong Sreng	28 June 2018	present	CPP
