= Fall of Phnom Penh =

1975 Khmer Rouge capture of the Cambodian capital

- Part of the Cambodian Civil War and the Vietnam War
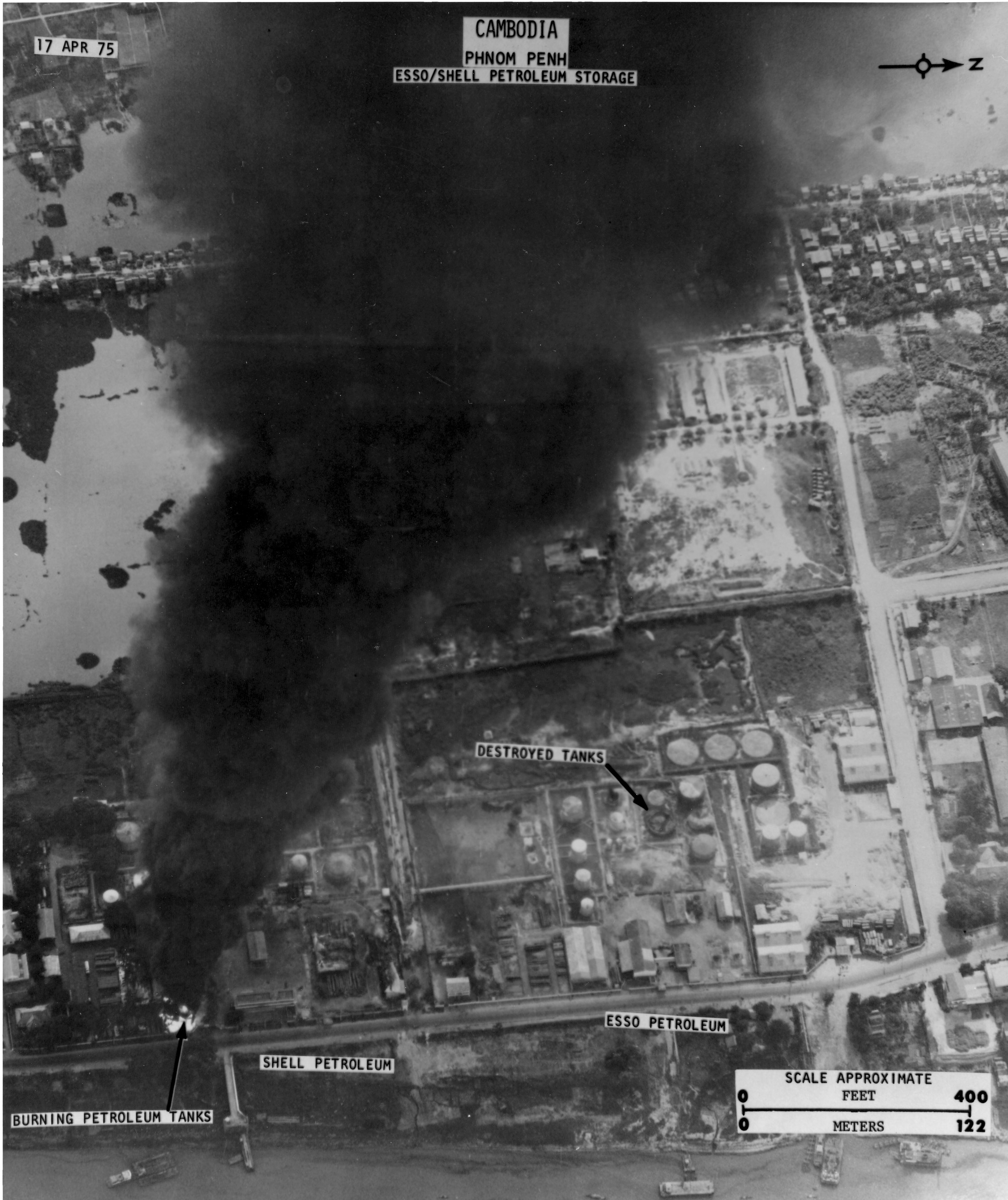
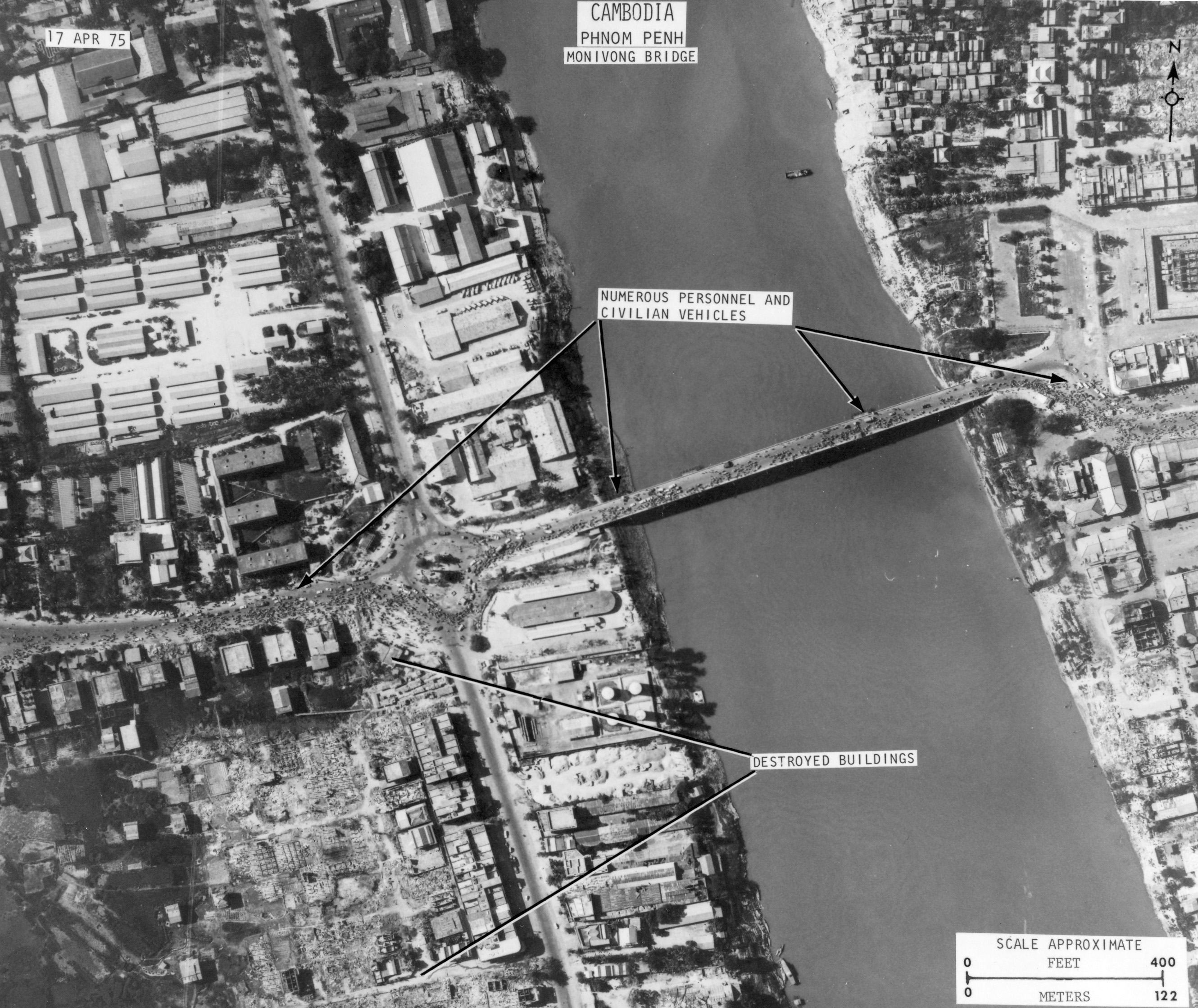
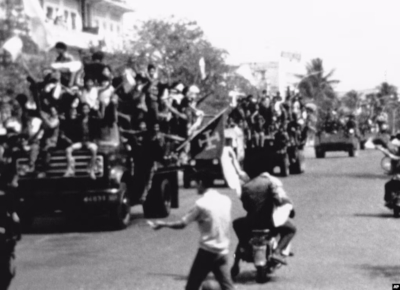
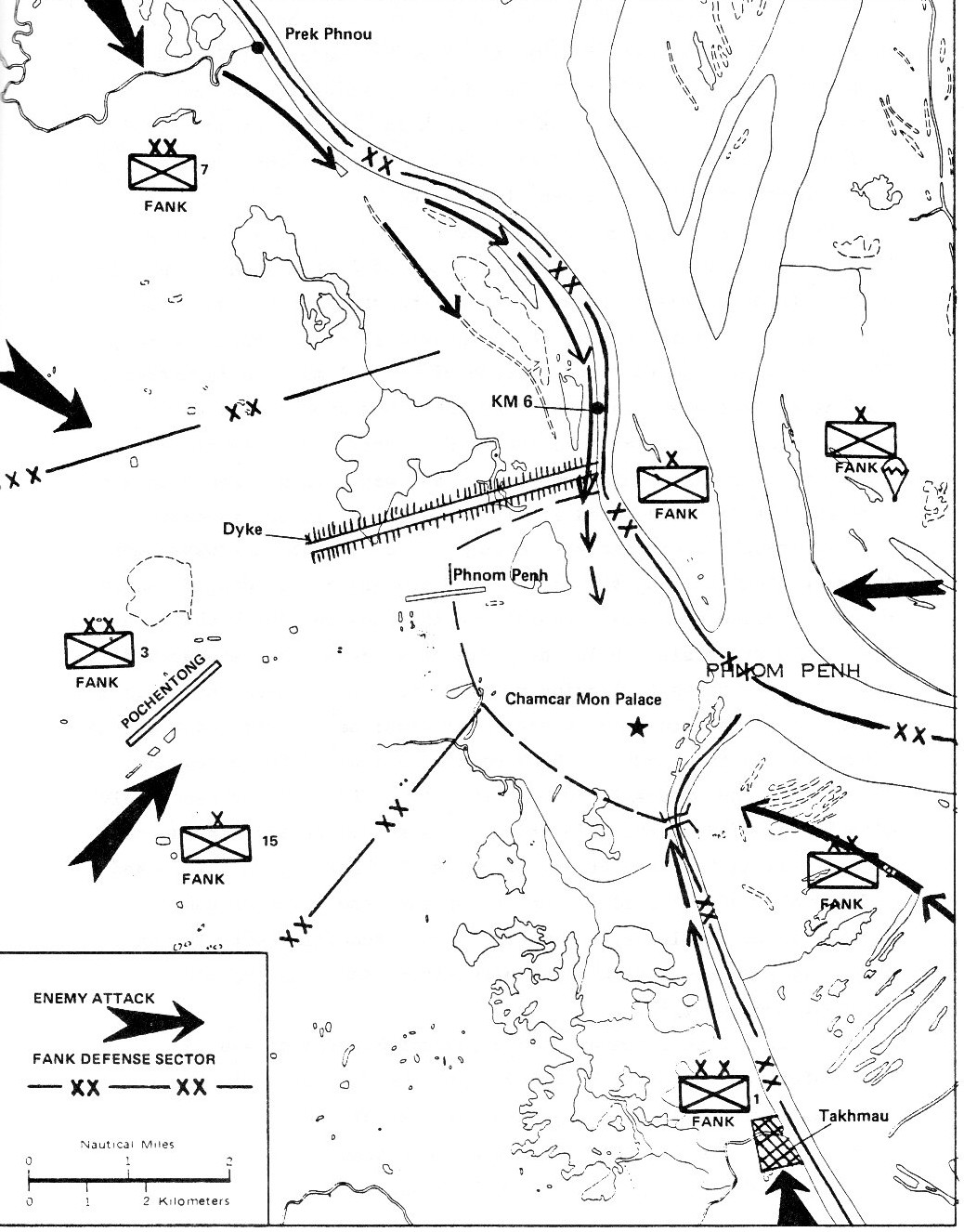
- Clockwise from top left: Aerial reconnaissance of Esso Shell oil storage tank ablaze; Aerial reconnaissance view of Monivong Bridge; MONATIO militia parading in Phnom Penh
Date	17 April 1975
Location	Phnom Penh, Khmer Republic
Result	Khmer Rouge victory

Belligerents
Khmer Rouge	Khmer Republic

Commanders and leaders
Pol Pot	Lon Nol; Sak Sutsakhan; Sirik Matak (executed); Long Boret (executed); Lon Non (executed); Vong Sarendy †; Dien Del

Units involved
Special Forces (Central - Highway 4 Front); Eastern Military District (Area 203); Western Army (Area 401); Southwestern Army Group (Area 405); Northern Army (Area 304)	FANK (1st Infantry Division) (2nd Infantry Division) (3rd Infantry Division) (7th Infantry Division) (7th Infantry Division) (1st Airborne Brigade); Pochentong Airport Defense Force

Strength
40,000	~20,000

Casualties and losses
Unknown	Unknown

The Fall of Phnom Penh was the capture of Phnom Penh, capital of the Khmer Republic (in present-day Cambodia), by the Khmer Rouge on 17 April 1975, effectively ending the Cambodian Civil War. At the beginning of the month, Phnom Penh, one of the last remaining strongholds of the Khmer Republic, was surrounded by the Khmer Rouge and totally dependent on aerial resupply through Pochentong Airport.

With a Khmer Rouge victory imminent, the United States government evacuated US nationals and allied Cambodians on 12 April. On 17 April, the Khmer Republic government evacuated the city, intending to establish a new government center close to the Thai border to continue resistance. Later that day, the last defences around Phnom Penh were overrun and the Khmer Rouge occupied Phnom Penh.

Captured Khmer Republic forces were taken to the Olympic Stadium where they were executed; senior government and military leaders were forced to write confessions prior to their executions. The Khmer Rouge ordered the evacuation of Phnom Penh, emptying the city except for expatriates who took refuge in the French embassy until 30 April, when they were transported to Thailand.

== Background ==
At the beginning of 1975, the Khmer Republic, a United States-supported military government, controlled only the Phnom Penh area and a string of towns along the Mekong River that provided the crucial supply route for food and munitions coming upriver from South Vietnam. As part of their 1975 dry season offensive, rather than renewing their frontal attacks on Phnom Penh, the Khmer Rouge set out to cut the crucial Mekong supply route. On 12 January 1975, the Khmer Rouge attacked Neak Luong, a key Khmer National Armed Forces (FANK) defensive outpost on the Mekong.

On 27 January, seven vessels limped into Phnom Penh, the survivors of a 16-ship convoy that had come under attack during the 100-kilometre (60 mi) journey from the South Vietnamese border. On 3 February, a convoy heading downriver hit naval mines laid by the Khmer Rouge at Phú Mỹ, approximately 74 kilometres (46 mi) from Phnom Penh. The Khmer National Navy (MNK) had mine-sweeping capability, but due to Khmer Rouge control of the riverbanks, mine-sweeping was impossible or at best, extremely costly. The MNK had lost a quarter of its ships, and 70 percent of its sailors had been killed or wounded.

By 17 February, the Khmer Republic abandoned attempts to reopen the Mekong supply line. All subsequent supplies for Phnom Penh would have to come in by air to Pochentong Airport. The United States quickly mobilised an airlift of food, fuel and ammunition into Phnom Penh, but as US support for the Khmer Republic was limited by the Case–Church Amendment, BirdAir, a company under contract to the US Government, controlled the airlift with a mixed fleet of C-130 and DC-8 planes, flying 20 times a day into Pochentong from U-Tapao Royal Thai Navy Airfield.

On 5 March, Khmer Rouge artillery at Toul Leap (11.574°N 104.757°E), north-west of Phnom Penh, shelled Pochentong Airport, but FANK troops recaptured Toul Leap on 15 March and ended the shelling. Khmer Rouge forces continued to close in to the north and west of the city and were soon able to fire on Pochentong again. On 22 March, rockets hit two supply aircraft, forcing the American embassy to announce the following day a suspension of the airlift until the security situation improved. Realizing that the Khmer Republic would soon collapse without supplies, the embassy reversed the suspension on 24 March and increased the number of aircraft available for the airlift. The hope among the Khmer Government and the embassy was that the Khmer Rouge offensive could be held back until the start of the rainy season in May when fighting typically abated.

== Offensive ==
=== Late March ===
By late March, the FANK maintained a defensive perimeter some 15 kilometres (9.3 mi) from central Phnom Penh. In the northwest, the 7th Division was in an increasingly difficult position; its front had been cut in several places, particularly in the region of Toul Leap which had changed hands several times. The 3rd Division, located on Route 4 in the vicinity of Bek Chan (11.51°N 104.748°E), some 10 kilometres (6.2 mi) west of Pochentong, was cut off from its own command post at Kompong Speu.

In the south, the 1st Division handled the defense, along with the 15th Brigade of Brigadier General Lon Non; it was the calmest part of the front at that time. In the region of Takhmau, Route 1 and the Bassac River, the 1st Division was subject to continued Khmer Rouge pressure. East of the capital were the Parachute Brigade and the troops of the Phnom Penh Military Region. The MNK naval base on the Chrouy Changvar peninsula (11.583°N 104.916°E) and the Khmer Air Force (KAF) base at Pochentong were defended by their own forces.

The key position of Neak Luong on the east bank of the Mekong was completely isolated. The KAF and the MNK were overstretched and undersupplied and could not satisfy the demands of the FANK. The general logistic situation for FANK was increasingly critical and the resupply of ammunition for the infantry could only be carried out sporadically.

=== 1 April ===
Premier Lon Nol resigned on 1 April. The departure ceremony at the Chamcar Mon Palace was attended by Khmer only, the diplomatic corps having not been invited. From the grounds of Chamcar Mon, helicopters took Lon Nol, his family and party to Pochentong, where Lon Nol met American ambassador John Gunther Dean before boarding an Air Cambodge flight to U-Tapao in Thailand and into exile. Saukam Khoy became acting President, and it was hoped that with Lon Nol's departure peace negotiations could progress.

The rapidly worsening situation of March was capped on the night of 1 April by the fall of Neak Luong, despite ferocious resistance and following a three-month siege. This development opened the southern approach to the capital and freed up 6000 Khmer Rouge soldiers to join the forces besieging Phnom Penh. The capture of six 105-mm howitzers at Neak Luong was a further menace to the capital.

=== 2–11 April ===
From 3–4 April, all FANK positions on Route 1 above Neak Luong held by the FANK 1st Division fell one after the other; any reinforcement, whether by road or via the Mekong, was impossible. North of the capital, in the 7th Division area, Khmer Rouge attacks came daily and despite regular air support there was no improvement in the situation there. Several counterattacks by FANK, carried out to retake lost positions, were unsuccessful. The losses suffered by the 1st Division grew each day and the evacuation of its sick and wounded by helicopter was no longer possible.

The last reserves of the high command, constituted by hastily taking the battalions of the former Provincial Guard, were rushed to the north, only to be completely dispersed by the Khmer Rouge after several hours of combat. A great breach was opened in the northern defenses, with no hope of closing it. To the west, the troops of Brigadier General Norodom Chantaraingsey's 3rd Division, despite reinforcements, were unable to join with their own elements at Kompong Speu and retake the position at Toul Leap. A computation error which caused FANK artillery fire to land on 3rd Division elements during the operation badly affected the unit's morale.

Throughout this period, civilian refugees fled toward the capital from all directions. The authorities, both civil and military, were swamped and did not know where to house them. Schools, pagodas and public gardens were occupied by the refugees; authorities had no way to determine who was friend and who was Khmer Rouge.

On 11 April in Peking, the US Government requested the immediate return of Prince Norodom Sihanouk, the figurehead leader of the National United Front of Kampuchea (FUNK), to Phnom Penh. Sihanouk rejected the request the following morning.

=== 12 April ===
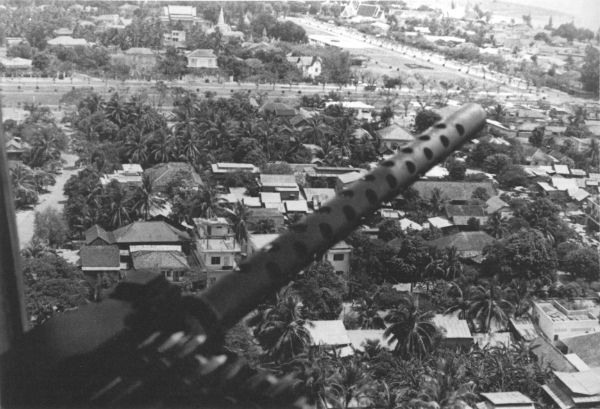
A view of Phnom Penh from a US helicopter, 12 April 1975

With the situation worsening in Phnom Penh, on 12 April the American embassy initiated Operation Eagle Pull, the evacuation of all US personnel. Ambassador Dean invited the members of the government to be evacuated, but all refused except for acting President Saukham Khoy, who left without telling his fellow leaders. The evacuation came as a shock to many in the Khmer Republic leadership, because Phnom Penh and almost all provincial capitals (except those in the east occupied by the North Vietnamese) were in government hands, packed with millions of refugees. Estimates put the population under government control at six million, and those under Khmer Rouge control at one million.

At 08:30, the Council of Ministers met in the office of Prime Minister Long Boret. It was decided that a general assembly should be convoked, consisting of the highest functionaries and military leaders. From 14:00 the general assembly sat in the Chamcar Mon Palace. It finally adopted a unanimous resolution asking for the transfer of power to the military and condemning Saukham Khoy for not handing over his office in a legitimate way. At 23:00 the general assembly elected the members of the Supreme Committee: Lieutenant general Sak Sutsakhan, the FANK Chief of Staff, Major General Thongvan Fanmuong, MNK Rear admiral Vong Sarendy, KAF commander Brigadier general Ea Chhong, Long Boret, Hang Thun Hak, Vice Prime Minister and Op Kim Ang, representative of the Social Republican Party.

The military situation had deteriorated sharply during the day. In the north, the defensive line was cut at several points by the Khmer Rouge, in spite of the fierce resistance by FANK units. Pochentong Airport was in imminent danger of being taken; the small military airport of Mean Chey had to be designated as an emergency landing place for the planes and helicopters bringing ammunition and supplies.

=== 13–16 April ===
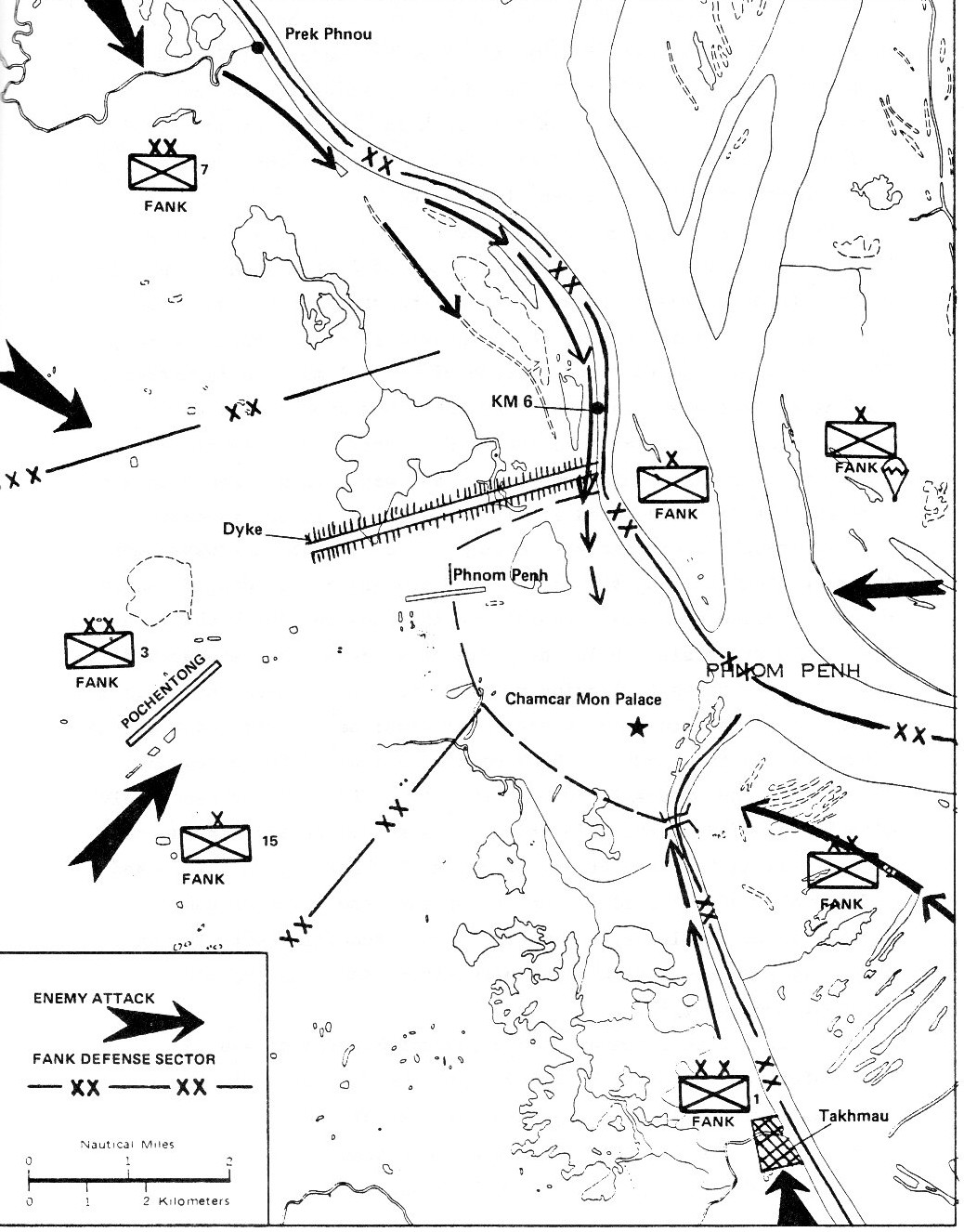
The final Khmer Rouge offensive against Phnom Penh

13 April was the Cambodian New Year and the Khmer Rouge continued to bombard Phnom Penh. At 09:00 the Supreme Committee had its first session and unanimously elected Sak Sutsakhan president, becoming both the head of the government and interim Chief of State. Sak decided to make a last peace offer to Prince Sihanouk, transferring the Republic and its armed forces to him, but not surrendering to the Khmer Rouge. Late that night, Sak called a meeting of the Council of Ministers, this time consisting of both the Supreme Committee and the Cabinet.

This Council made decisions including political and military measures, channeling the ever-increasing stream of refugees into schools, pagodas, their feeding, the reshuffling of the cabinet, reinforcing the troops in Phnom Penh by flying in a few battalions from different provinces through the Mean Chey airport and the formation of an Ad Hoc Committee chaired by Long Boret to prepare peace overtures for either Prince Sihanouk or the Khmer Rouge.

By 14 April, the military situation was becoming increasingly precarious. That morning, the Cabinet met at Sak's office at the General Staff Headquarters (11.567°N 104.925°E). At 10:25 a KAF pilot dropped four 110-kilogram (250 lb) bombs from his T-28 light attack plane. Two of the bombs exploded about 20 metres (60 ft) from Sak's office, killing seven officers and NCOs and wounding twenty others. Sak declared a 24-hour curfew and announced that the battle would continue.

That afternoon Takhmau, the capital of the Kandal Province and 11 kilometres (6.8 mi) south of Phnom Penh, fell to the Khmer Rouge. The loss of this key point in the FANK defense perimeter had a demoralizing effect. Several counterattacks were initiated but to no avail. Soon a fierce battle was in progress in the southern suburbs. The U.S. aerial resupply into Pochentong was completely halted.

The 15th began with the Khmer Rouge pressing in from north and west. Pochentong and the dike running east–west to the north of Phnom Penh, both of which formed the last ring of defense around the capital, were overrun by Khmer Rouge assaults. The intervention of the Parachute Brigade, brought back from the east of the Mekong, had no effect on the situation to the west of the capital. The brigade tried to move west, but was only able to get 6 kilometres (3.7 mi) down Route 4. Meanwhile, refugees continued to pour into the city.

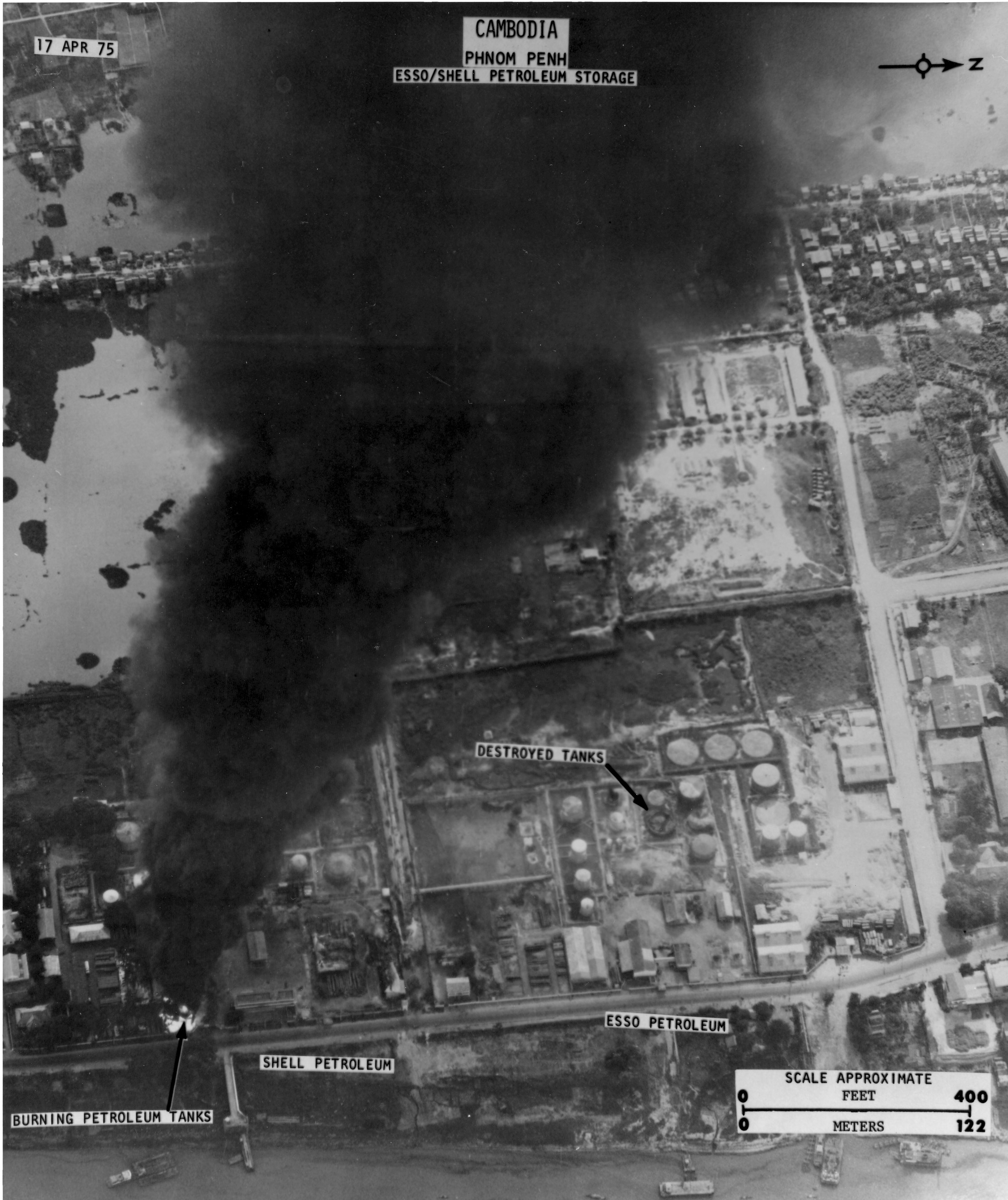
An aerial reconnaissance view of a burning Esso Shell oil storage tank, Phnom Penh, 17 April 1975

On 16 April, the morning Cabinet meeting was devoted entirely to the mechanics of sending a peace offer to Peking as quickly as possible. Long Boret drafted the offer calling for an immediate ceasefire and a transfer of power to FUNK. The offer was sent to Peking via the International Committee of the Red Cross (ICRC) and the Agence France-Presse. The military situation was becoming worse, the Shell oil depot (11.607°N 104.917°E) north of the city was set ablaze by gunfire, while fire swept shacks to the south of the city.

All afternoon the Cabinet waited for the answer from Peking. By 23:00 an answer had still not arrived and the Cabinet realized that the Khmer Rouge did not want to accept the offer. Meanwhile the Khmer Rouge had occupied the east bank of the Mekong following the withdrawal of the Parachute Brigade, while General Dien Del's 2nd Division held the Monivong Bridge.

KAF T-28Ds flew their last combat sortie by bombing the KAF control centre and hangars at Pochentong upon its capture by the Khmer Rouge. After virtually expending their ordnance reserves, 97 KAF aircraft escaped from airbases and auxiliary airfields throughout Cambodia, with a small number of civilian dependents on board to safe havens in neighbouring Thailand.

=== 17 April ===
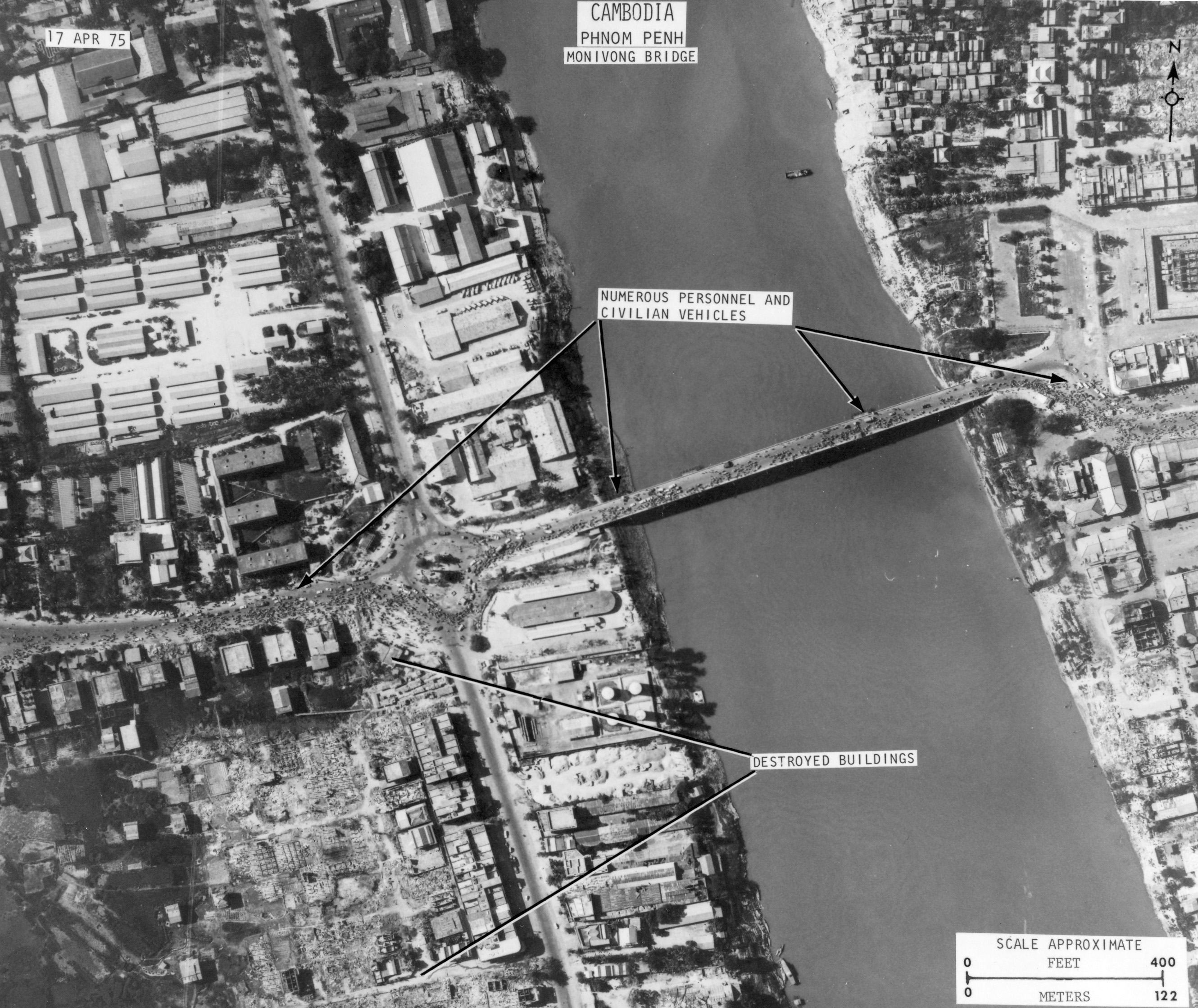
An aerial reconnaissance view of the Monivong Bridge, Phnom Penh, 17 April 1975

At 02:00 on 17 April the Cabinet agreed that, as its peace offer had not been accepted, it would move the Cabinet, the Supreme Committee and even members of the Assembly from Phnom Penh to the north to the capital of Oddar Meanchey Province on the Thai border in order to continue resistance from there. The only way to leave the capital was by helicopter. At 04:00 the members of the Government met in the garden in front of the Wat Botum Vaddey (11.559°N 104.932°E) for evacuation, but the helicopters did not show up.

The Government members returned to Premier Long Boret's house at 05:30 and decided to resist to the death in Phnom Penh itself. After 06:00, the Minister of Information, Thong Lim Huong, brought a cable that just arrived from Peking advising that the peace appeal had been rejected by Sihanouk. At the same time, they branded the seven members of the Supreme Committee as chief traitors, in addition to the seven who had taken power in 1970.

Heavy fighting had been taking place since 04:00 in the north of the city around the main power station (11.59°N 104.915°E). By dawn, the firing ceased as the FANK forces gave way to the Khmer Rouge and retreated along Monivong Boulevard into the city center. Admiral Vong Sarendy had returned to the naval base which was under attack by the Khmer Rouge. He called Sak later advising that the base was surrounded and about to be overrun. As Khmer Rouge forces entered the command post Sarendy committed suicide.

By 08:00 the rest of the Cabinet, the deputies and the senators left the session, leaving Long Boret and Sak. General Thach Reng arrived to plead with them to leave with him, as he still had his men of the Special Forces and seven UH-1 helicopters at his disposal at the Olympic Stadium. At approximately 08:30 Sak and his family boarded a helicopter and were flown out, as was KAF commander Ea Chhong. Meanwhile, Long Boret boarded another helicopter which failed to take off.

Four helicopters flew to Kampong Thom to refuel, arriving at 09:30. Establishing radio contact with Phnom Penh, Sak learned that the Khmer Rouge had penetrated into the General Staff Headquarters. General Mey Sichan addressed the nation and the troops in Sak's name asking them to hoist the white flag as a sign of peace. Sak's helicopter arrived at Oddar Meanchey at 13:30, as the collapse of the Republic was imminent. Any chance of reestablishing the Government evaporated and the assembled officers decided to seek exile in Thailand.

Khmer Rouge soldiers entered the capital from multiple directions at once. One column of soldiers entered at the northern roundabout near the French Embassy to march southward down Monivong Boulevard. Others entered the southern part of the city from the causeway road (street 271), leaving the causeway at streets 430 and 488, near the Phsar Daem Thkov roundabout. Another column entered the city from the west over the Stoeng Mean Chey bridge along Monireth Boulevard.

As the Khmer Rouge entered the capital in the north, a small group of soldiers and armed students, styled as the MONATIO ("National Movement") and led by Hem Keth Dara, began driving around the city welcoming the arrival of the Khmer Rouge. MONATIO was apparently a creation of Lon Nol, in an attempt to ingratiate himself and share power with the Khmer Rouge. Initially tolerated by the Khmer Rouge, MONATIO members were later rounded up and executed.

After entering the city, Khmer Rouge soldiers stationed themselves at the major crossroads where they disarmed FANK soldiers and collected weapons. The disarmed soldiers were then marched to the Olympic Stadium where they were later executed. The Khmer Rouge held a press conference at the Ministry of Information where a number of prisoners, including Lon Non and Hem Keth Dara, were being held. A car carrying Long Boret arrived and he joined the prisoners.

After midday the Khmer Rouge ordered the evacuation of the city for three days, evicting expatriates and Cambodians from the Hotel Le Phnom, which the ICRC had sought to establish as a neutral zone, and emptying the city's hospitals, which contained approximately 20,000 wounded who were unlikely to survive the journey to the countryside. Approximately 800 expatriates and 600 Cambodians took refuge at the French embassy (11.583°N 104.916°E). At this time the Khmer Rouge military forces numbered only 68,000, with a further 14,000 party members. Elizabeth Becker asserts that lacking the numbers necessary to openly control Cambodia, emptying Phnom Penh of those of its population who were indifferent or openly hostile to them was essential for securing Khmer Rouge control.

Koy Thuon, a Khmer Rouge deputy front commander, organized the "Committee for Wiping Out Enemies" at the Hotel Monorom (11.57°N 104.918°E). Its first action was to order the immediate execution of Lon Non and other leading government figures. Captured FANK officers were taken to the Hotel Monorom to write their biographies and then to the Olympic Stadium, where they were executed.

== Aftermath ==
Map of the Khmer Rouge occupation zones in Phnom Penh following its fall on 17 April 1975

On the morning of 18 April, Sak and the remaining members of the Khmer Republic Government and assorted military personnel boarded a KAF C-123 and flew to U-Tapao and into exile. The same day the Khmer Rouge ordered all Cambodians in the French embassy, other than women married to Frenchmen, to leave the embassy or they would take it over; they rejected any right of asylum. Among those evicted was Prince Sisowath Sirik Matak, one of those responsible for the removal of Sihanouk from power in 1970 and who had been branded one of the seven original traitors marked for execution by the FUNK. Also evicted were Princess Mam Manivan Phanivong, one of Sihanouk's wives; Khy-Taing Lim, the Minister of Finance; and Loeung Nal, the Minister of Health.

Long Boret was executed on the grounds of the Cercle Sportif in Phnom Penh (now the location of the US embassy) on or about 21 April. Khmer Rouge Radio subsequently reported that he had been beheaded but other reports indicate that he and Sisowath Sirik Matak were executed by firing squad or that he was shot in the kidney and left to suffer a slow death, while his family were executed by machine gun fire.

Pol Pot arrived in a deserted Phnom Penh on 23 April. On 30 April, the occupants of the French embassy were loaded onto trucks and driven to the Thai border, arriving four days later.

The collapse of the Khmer Republic following the Fall of Phnom Penh allowed the Khmer Rouge to consolidate their control over Cambodia, renaming the country to Kampuchea, and they began the implementation of their agrarian socialism. Supporters of the Khmer Republic and the intelligentsia were killed, while the former urban population was used as forced labor in the countryside, many dying from physical abuse, disease and malnutrition. The ensuing Cambodian genocide resulted in 1.5–2 million deaths.

The Khmer Rouge severed all contact with the outside world other than with its supporters, China and North Vietnam. After the Fall of Saigon on 30 April 1975, the Khmer Rouge demanded that all People's Army of Vietnam (PAVN) and Viet Cong forces leave their base areas in Cambodia, but the PAVN refused to leave certain areas which they claimed were Vietnamese territory. The PAVN also moved to take control of islands formerly controlled by South Vietnam and other territory and islands contested between Vietnam and Cambodia. This led to a series of clashes between Vietnam and Cambodia on several islands in May 1975 and the seizure of foreign ships by the Khmer Rouge, which triggered the Mayaguez incident. Clashes between Cambodia and Vietnam continued until August 1975. Relations between the two countries improved thereafter until early 1977, when the Kampuchea Revolutionary Army (RAK) began attacking Vietnamese border provinces, killing hundreds of Vietnamese civilians; this eventually resulted in the Cambodian–Vietnamese War starting in December 1978.

== In popular culture ==
The Fall of Phnom Penh is depicted in the films The Killing Fields, The Gate and First They Killed My Father.

== See also ==
- Fall of Saigon
- Fall of Vientiane
- 1975 spring offensive
