= Embassy of the United States, Phnom Penh =

Diplomatic mission of the United States to Cambodia

Embassy of the United States, Phnom Penh ស្ថានទូតសហរដ្ឋអាមេរិក រាជធានីភ្នំពេញ
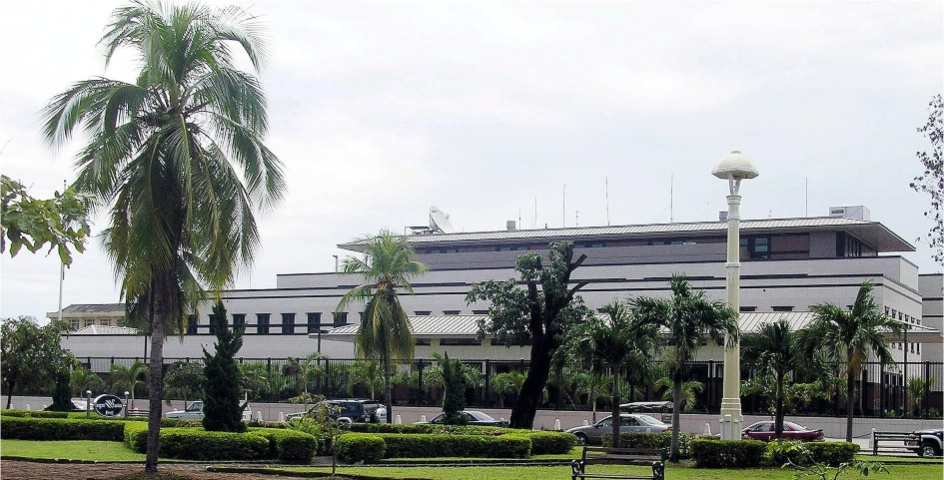
- Location: Phnom Penh, Cambodia
- Address: 1 St. 96, Phnom Penh
- Coordinates: 11°34′30″N 104°55′17″E
- Opened: 18 January 2006
- Chargé d'affaires: Christopher J. Anderson
- Website: Official website

The Embassy of the United States in Phnom Penh is the sole diplomatic mission of the United States to Cambodia. It is located in the capital Phnom Penh. The United States has had a physical diplomatic presence in Cambodia ever since relations were initiated in 1950, which was promoted to an embassy in 1952. A history of strained and suspended relations throughout the Cold War led to the embassy being forced to close at various times, including permanently between 1965 and 1969 and again between 1975 and 1991. Before the latter closure, embassy staff were evacuated in an operation similar to the more famous US evacuation of Saigon. As US-Cambodia relations improved and security threats increased through the 2000s, a new purpose-built complex was constructed. It was opened in 2006, being one of the first American diplomatic missions constructed around the post-9/11 "Standard Embassy Design" model.

== History ==
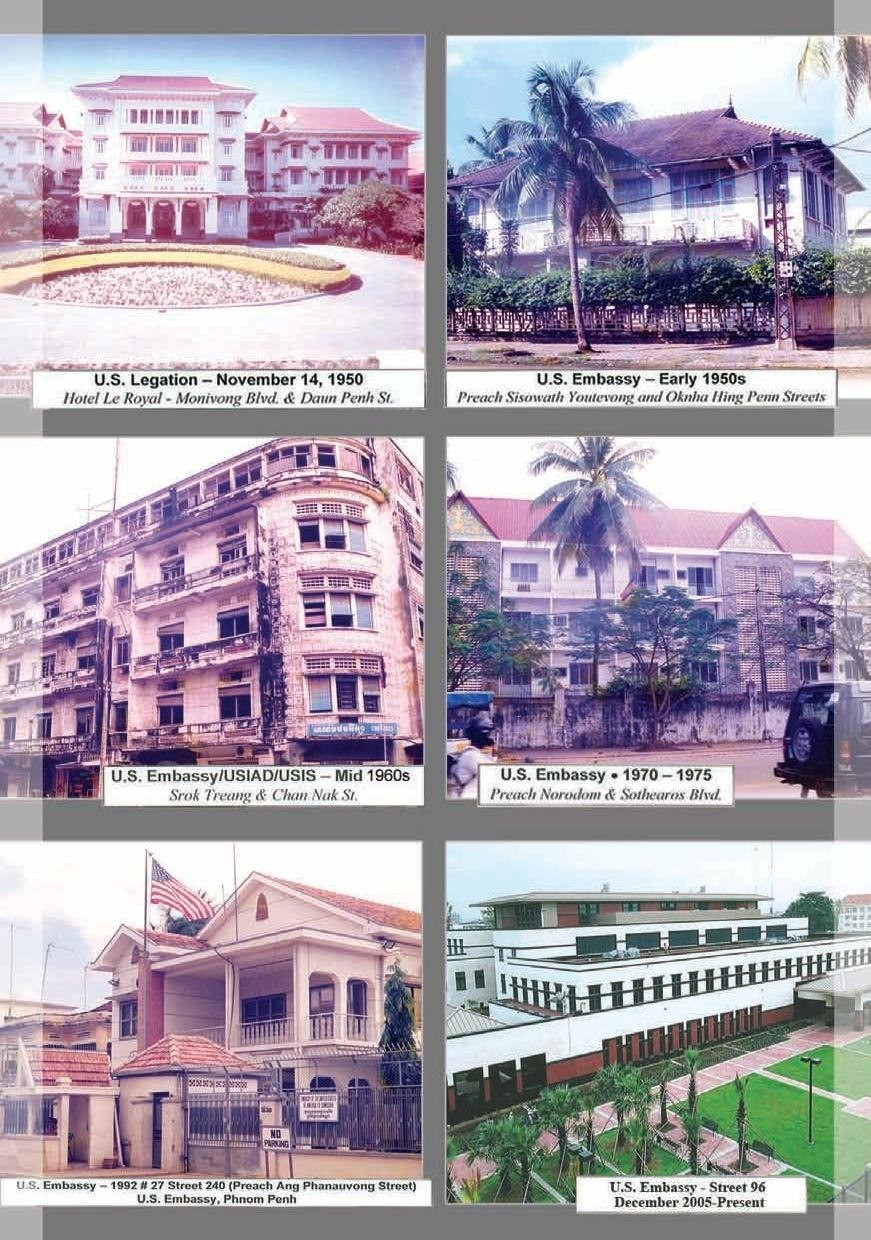
History of US presence in Phnom Penh

The United States established its first direct diplomatic relationship with Cambodia on June 29, 1950, with the appointment of Donald R. Heath as Envoy Extraordinary and Minister Plenipotentiary. Heath presented his credentials to King Sihanouk on July 11, 1950. The US Legation opened in Phnom Penh on November 14. Operations were initially conducted from the renowned Hotel Le Royal until a Legation office and US Information Service library were established in a new location. The Legation was raised to embassy status on June 25, 1952, at which point Heath became the first US Ambassador to Cambodia. A new embassy designed by Eliot Noyes in 1960 was proposed, but became one of various projects shelved by congressman Wayne Hays over disputes about the style and necessity of new US diplomatic architecture.

As part of a growing anti-American sentiment in the country, there were two attacks on the embassy in the mid-1960s. The first, in March 1964, caused over $150,000 in damage and led to increased suspicion in US-Cambodia relations. Ambassador Herbert D. Spivack suspected that Prince Sihanouk had purposely orchestrated the incident and a similar event at the British embassy. The second incident in 1965 led to less destruction, with the embassy not being breached, but rocks were thrown through the windows and there were still thousands of dollars of damages incurred. In response to the last attack and alleging that the United States was responsible for recent cross-border air attacks by South Vietnam that had killed Cambodian citizens, Sihanouk announced the severance of relations with the United States in 1965. Although Sihanouk still wished to maintain a consulate in the country to facilitate tourism in order to preserve the foreign currency inflow that it brought, a lack of assurances about maintaining an uninterrupted transition from the Cambodian side led to the US pulling out entirely. During this break in relations, Australia represented the United States in Phnom Penh. With the further penetration of Vietnamese communist forces into Cambodia, Sihanouk was anxious to restore relations, and the US Embassy reopened on August 16, 1969. During the fall of Phnom Penh to the Khmer Rouge in 1975, the US government evacuated embassy personnel in Operation Eagle Pull, which has been seen as a predecessor to the evacuation of the embassy in Saigon the same year. The French embassy was still staffed after the takeover and temporarily hosted foreigners as well as Cambodian refugees. Relations were then suspended between 1975 and 1990 under the Khmer Rouge-led Democratic Kampuchea and later the People's Republic of Kampuchea.

On November 11, 1991, the same day that UN forces entered Phnom Penh, the United States restored its presence by opening a liaison office in Phnom Penh and appointed Charles H. Twining as US representative. USAID followed suit and reopened its mission in 1992. After the United States and the Kingdom of Cambodia reestablished full diplomatic relations, the US Mission was upgraded in status to a full embassy, and on May 17, 1994, Twining presented his credentials as US ambassador.

=== Current complex ===
Plans for a new location were in the works from at least 2000, when the embassy announced plans to acquire a new site in August. This was partly motivated by security; in addition to the general tightening of protocol in all US diplomatic missions after two embassies were bombed in 1998, terrorist threats and a protest-turned-riot over the United States bombing of the Chinese embassy in Belgrade in 1999 led to the embassy nearly being breached and forced it to close in December that year. However, UNESCO's Phnom Penh office publicly objected to one of the planned sites, located next to the Wat Phnom temple and home to the Phnom Penh International Youth Club (earlier the Cercle Sportif), which they considered "an important part of Phnom Penh's urban heritage". In the end, the Cercle Sportif site was bought from the city and designated the new embassy site in November, with the embassy pledging to "do right by the site" and collaborate with UNESCO on the new complex. The contracts for the main embassy compound were awarded in 2002, with a new annex for USAID planned to be awarded in 2004.

Groundbreaking took place on October 9, 2002. However, after delays in certification led to the site being idle for a month, construction on the new embassy started on July 31, 2003. From initial design to final inspection, it took nearly three years to complete the compound, which was finished several months before schedule. According to Government Accountability Office reports, construction costs stayed under budget in 2004 and 2005. Before opening, the chancery reportedly became a popular backdrop for wedding photo shoots. The post was occupied on December 12, 2005.

The new complex was officially opened on January 18, 2006, in a ceremony initiated by diplomat Christopher R. Hill, then Assistant Secretary of State. As a "gift", prime minister Hun Sen, who had talked to Hill earlier that day, released four political prisoners: Rong Chhun, Kem Sokha, Mam Sonando as well as activist and Cambodian Center for Human Rights member Pa Nguon Tieng. The USAID annex was finished by May 2006. The compound, which covers an area of 6.2 acres (2.5 hectares), is one of the first examples of the post-9/11 higher-security "Standard Embassy Design" (SED) program, having been planned to be a "flagship" for the SED model. The first permanent embassy complex built and owned by the United States in Cambodia, it has been promoted by the Department of State as a "symbol of our commitment to our future relations with Cambodia".

== See also ==
- List of ambassadors of the United States to Cambodia
