= Neak Loeung Bridge =

Neak Loeung Bridge ស្ពានអ្នកលឿង (Spean Neak Loeung)
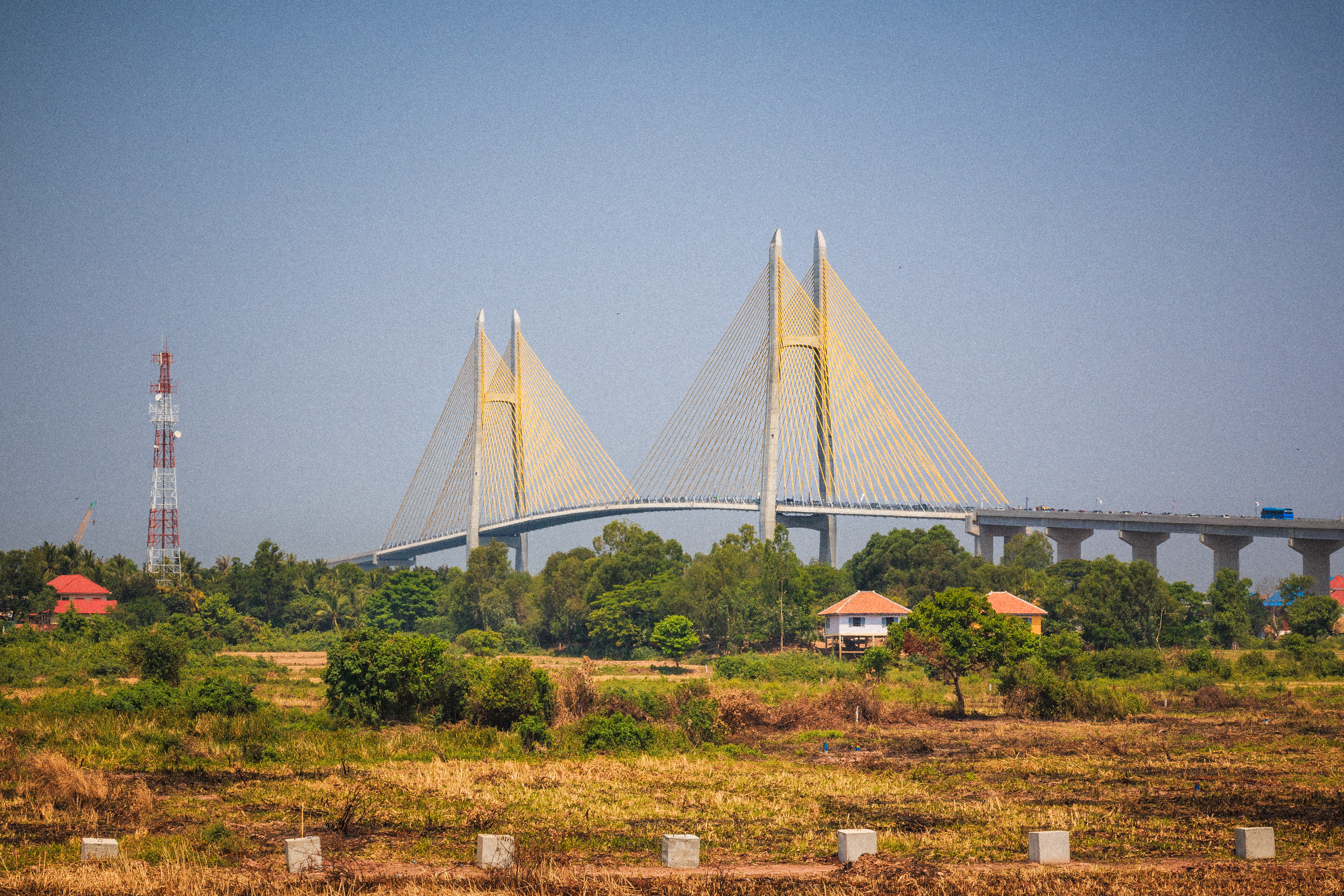
- The finished bridge in 2015
- Coordinates: 11.27611°N 105.27915°E
- Carries: Highway 1
- Crosses: Mekong River
- Locale: Neak Loeung

Characteristics
- Total length: 2215 m
- Height: 130m
- Longest span: 320 m
- Clearance below: 37.5m

History
- Construction start: February 12, 2011
- Opened: April 6, 2015
- Replaces: Ferry

Location
- Interactive map of Neak Loeung Bridge

Tsubasa Bridge (Khmer: ស្ពានត្សឹបាសា), also known as Neak Loeung Bridge (ស្ពានអ្នកលឿង), links Kandal Province with the town of Neak Loeung, Prey Veng Province in Cambodia, on the heavily travelled Highway 1 between Phnom Penh, and Ho Chi Minh City in Vietnam.

== Construction ==
This 2.2 km cable-stayed bridge eliminated a ferry crossing and is the longest bridge across the Mekong River in Cambodia, 300 metres longer than its nearest rival, the Koh Kong Bridge. The project includes the main cable-stayed section totalling 640m, two composite girder approach sections of 900m and 675m, and approach embankments totalling 3.1 km.

The inauguration ceremony to begin construction occurred on February 12, 2011. The bridge opened to traffic in April 2015. It was funded and built by a Japanese government donation (Cambodia's third Japanese donated bridge) and its image appears on the new 500 riel note. The bridge is part of a larger programme of works to improve connectivity along Asian Highway 1 from Thailand to Vietnam.

== Images ==
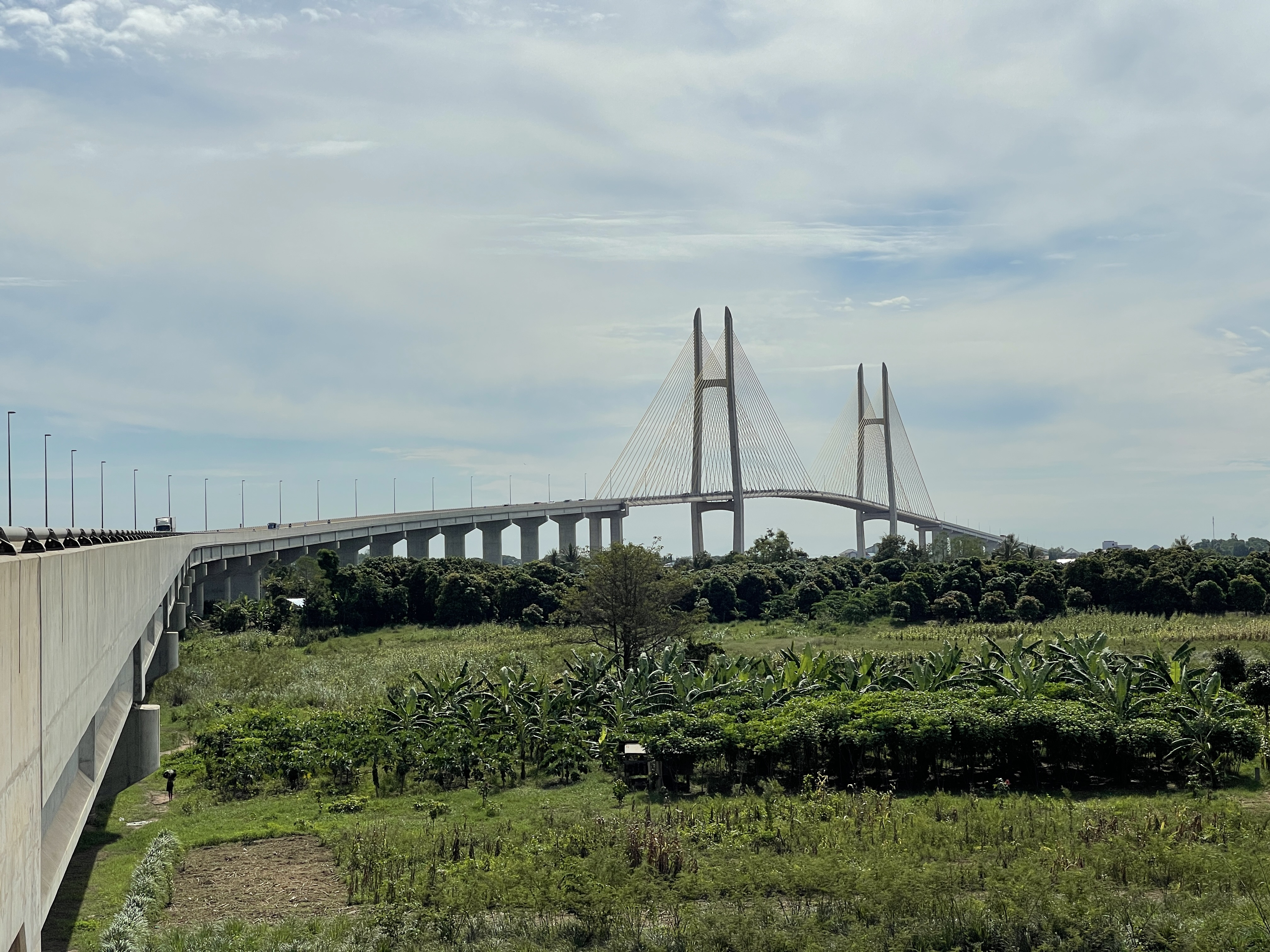
Neak Loeung Bridge or Tsubasa Bridge

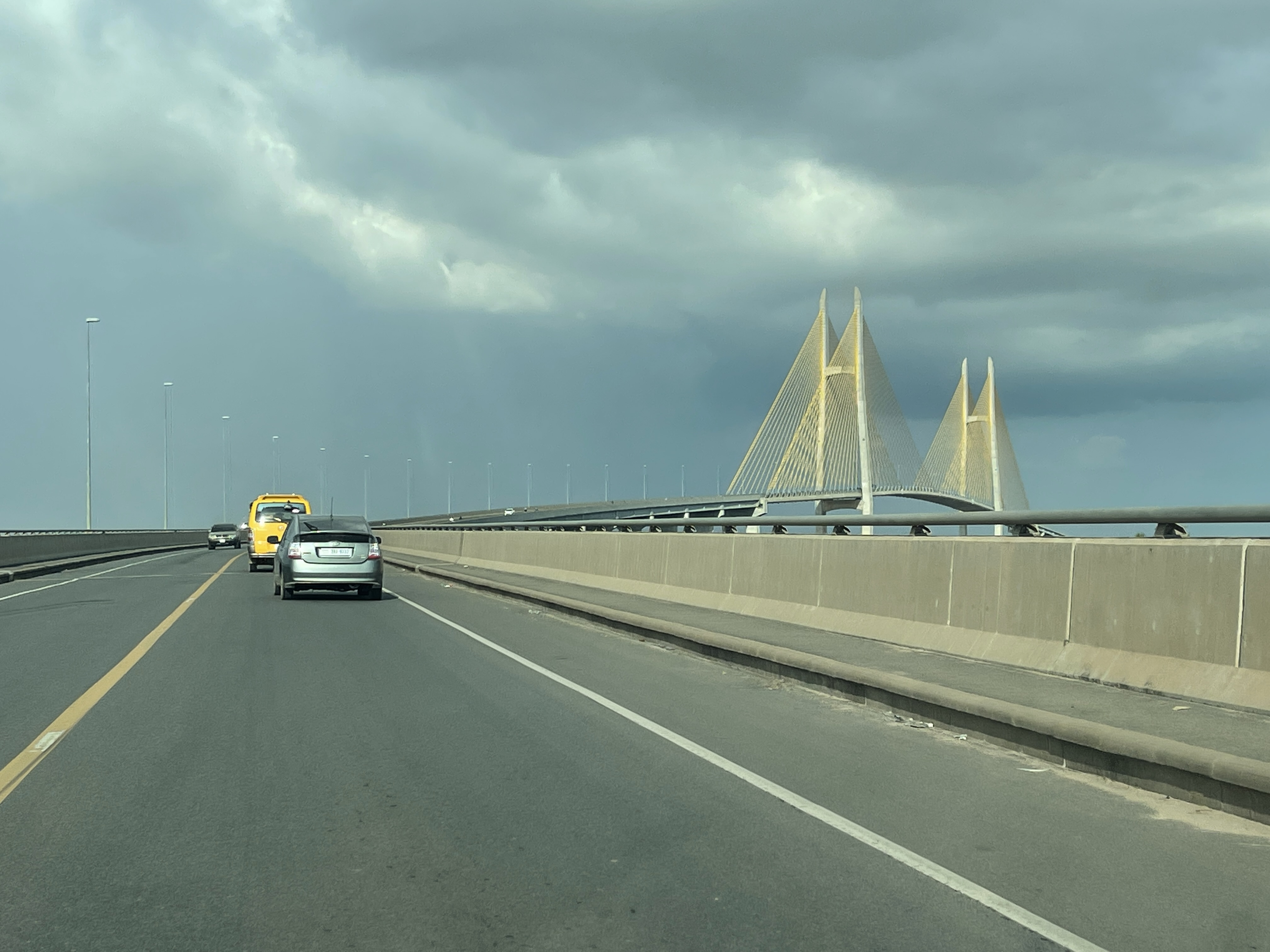
Tsubasa Bridge
