= Fall of Phnom Penh (disambiguation) =

The Fall of Phnom Penh may refer to:

- Fall of Phnom Penh in 1975, leading to the end of the Cambodian Civil War
- Fall of Phnom Penh (1979), leading to the capture of Phnom Penh by Vietnamese
