= Peam Ro District =

District in Prey Veng Province, Cambodia

Peam Ro ពាមរក៏
- District
- Peam Ro District ស្រុកពាមរក៍
- Location in Cambodia
- Coordinates: 11°16′N 105°17′E
- Country: Cambodia
- Province: Prey Veng

Population (1998)
  - Total: 63,534
- Time zone: UTC+7 (ICT)
- Geocode: 1407

Peam Ro (Khmer: ស្រុកពាមរក៏, pronounced [piəm.rɔː]) is a district located in Prey Veng Province, in south eastern Cambodia.

Peam Ro district is a district located in Prey Veng province, in south eastern Cambodia. It is bordered with Peam Chor and Preah Sdach districts to the south, Ba Phnum and Svay Antor districts to the east, and Krong Prey Veng and Kampong Leav to the north. Mekong River stretches along the border between PMR and LDK dividing the area into two different districts. Most communes in this low land district are clustered along the banks of the river, and therefore boats are an important form of transport during rainy season. PMR is subdivided into 8 (eight) communes further subdivided into 41 villages. The district covers 20,390 ha: 14,300 ha for cultivation, 2,846 ha for construction, 798 ha flooded forest, and 2,446 ha of other land.

== Capital ==
The district capital is at Neak Leung town on National Highway 1.

== Population ==
The district has a population of 63,534 (1998).
