= MONATIO =

Alleged political movement in Cambodia

Mouvement National
- Flag used by MONATIO
- Leader: Hem Keth Dara
- Dates active: 17 April 1975
- Ideology: Khmer nationalism
- Wars: Cambodian Civil War: Fall of Phnom Penh

MONATIO, short for Mouvement National (lit. 'National Movement'), was a short-lived, supposedly nationalist, political faction in Cambodia. The exact nature of the group is still obscure. On April 17, 1975, as the Khmer Rouge had entered Phnom Penh, this group took out a motor-cavalcade on the streets of the capital welcoming the arrival of the Khmer Rouge.

== Organization ==
The group consisted of a handful of soldiers, dressed in black uniforms, accompanied by a number of students. According to Time, MONATIO was headed by the 29 year old student leader Hem Keth Dara and the whole group in turn manipulated by Lon Non, brother of Lon Nol.

Initially tolerated by the Khmer Rouge, MONATIO members were later rounded up and executed, along with its leader Hem Keth Dara. The Khmer Rouge later claimed that MONATIO had been a CIA conspiracy against the revolutionary government.

A film on the events of 1975, called MONATIO, was made by Norodom Sihanouk.

== Gallery ==
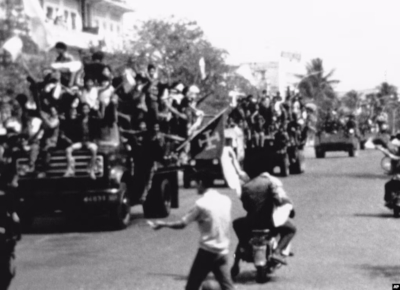
MONATIO militias parading in Phnom Penh
