= National Highway 1 (Cambodia) =

Road in Cambodia

National Highway 1

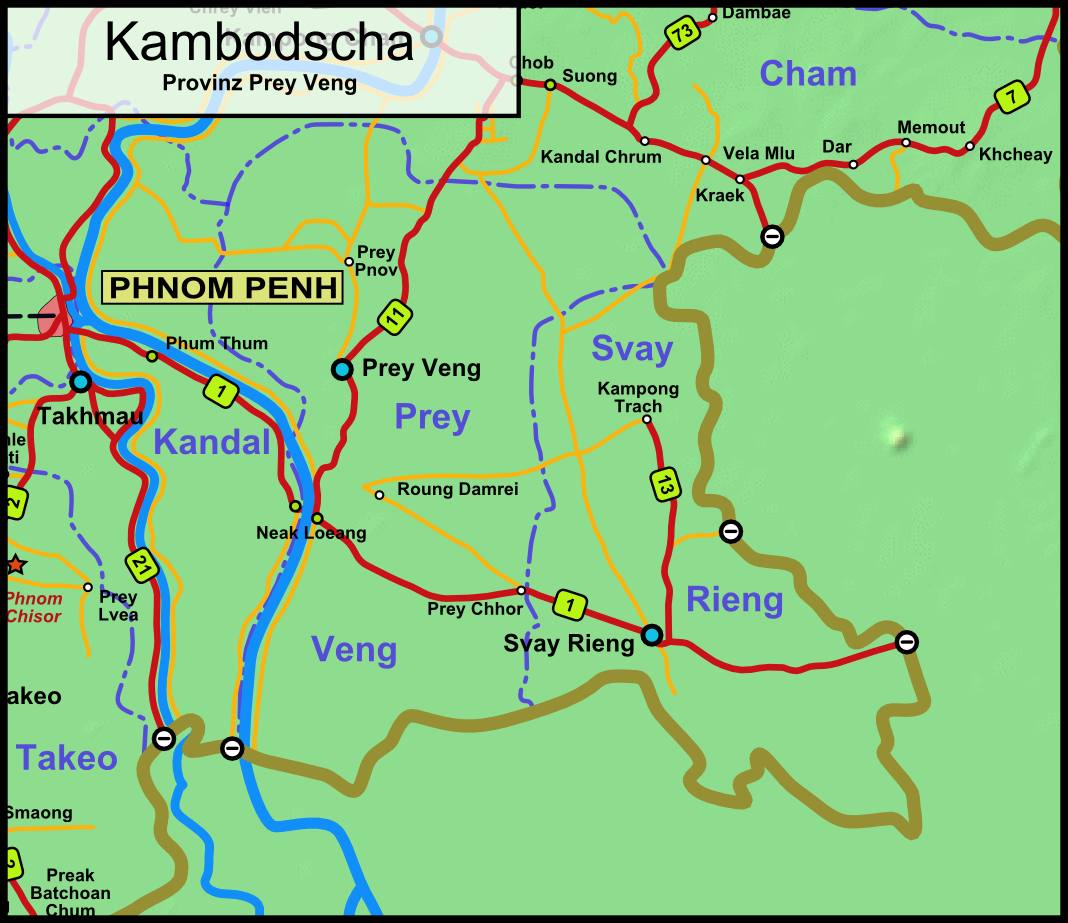

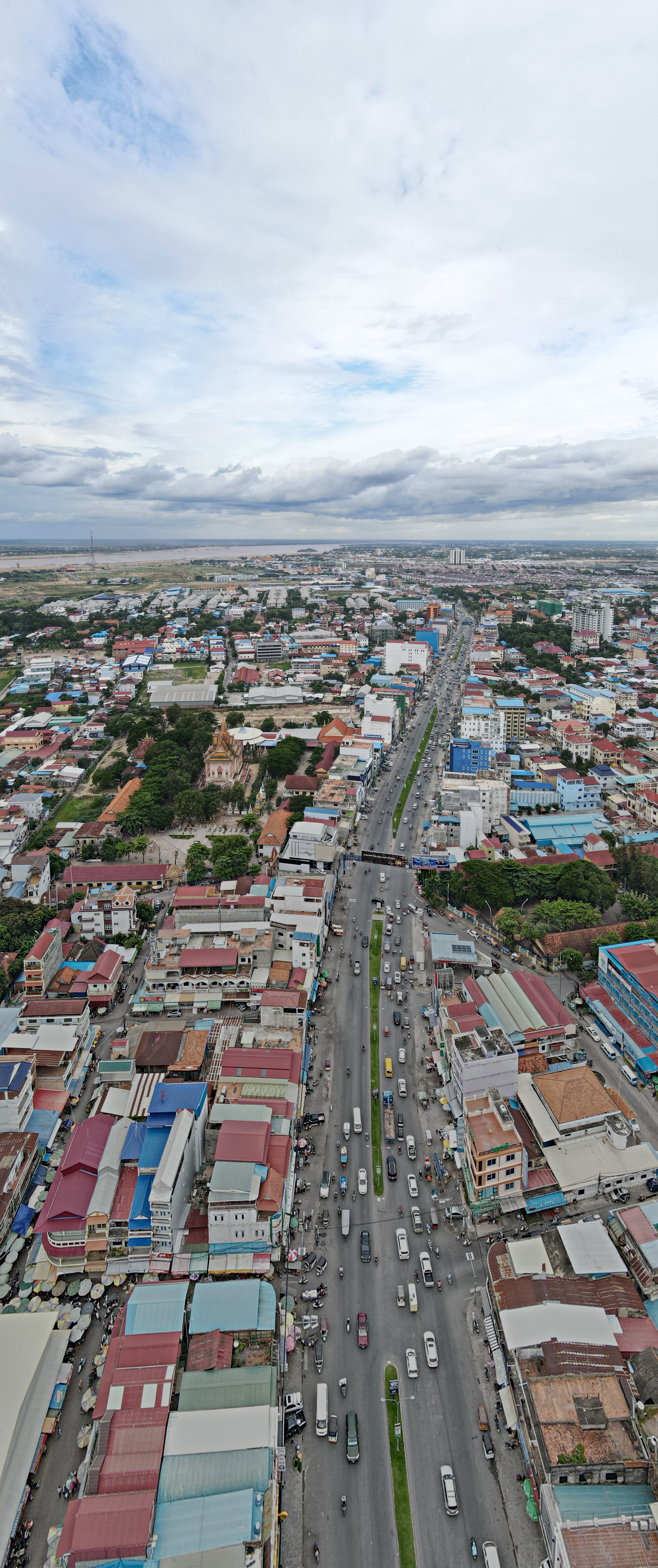
- Aerial View of National Highway 1 from Monivong Bridge, Phnom Penh

Route information
- Part of AH1

Major junctions
- From: Stat Chas Circle Garden, near the French Embassy, Phnom Penh. 11.584732°N 104.916168°E
- To: Border Check Point, Bavet, Svay Rieng Province. 11.075996°N 106.171908°E

Location
- Country: Cambodia

Highway system
- Transport in Cambodia

National Highway 1 or National Road No.1 (10001) is one of the national highways of Cambodia. With a length of 167.10 km (103.83 mi), it connects the capital of Phnom Penh, through Prey Veng Province, with Bavet, Svay Rieng Province on the border with Vietnam, and continues in Vietnam as the QL22 Highway to Ho Chi Minh City in the south east. In Phnom Penh the road converges with National Highway 2 near Monivong Bridge and National Highway 5 at Stat Chas Circle Garden, near the French Embassy.

== History ==
Originally constructed during French colonial times, National Highway 1 is an important link from Phnom Penh to Ho Chi Minh City, formerly Saigon. The road was partly destroyed by carpet bombing by the US in the early 1970s. In 1981, Cambodia opened a newly repaired section of National Highway 1 to the Vietnamese border.

In April 2015, Tsubasa Bridge (also known as the Neak Loeung Bridge), a 2.2 km cable-stayed bridge with a single carriageway road, was opened replacing the ferry crossing service which was required to cross the Mekong River on National Road 1. It remains the longest bridge across the Mekong River in Cambodia. The bridge was built with assistance from the Japanese government totaling approximately $127 million US dollars.

== Route ==
The NH 1 starts in Phnom Penh, the capital of Cambodia, where it joins the National Highway 5 at Stat Chas Circle Garden, near the French Embassy. In the city it crosses National Highway 2, which leads south. The road crosses the Bassac River via a double bridge. There is a three-lane section here, the rest of the route is single-lane. The NH 1 then runs southeast and parallels the Mekong. At Neak Loeung it crosses the Mekong over the Tsubasa Bridge into Prey Veng Province.

The second part goes through the plains of southeastern Cambodia. The route is mostly lined with smaller villages, with the exception of the small town of Svay Rieng. The road ends at the Border Check Point in Bavet, Svay Rieng Province, and on the Vietnamese side, it continues as the QL22 highway to Ho Chi Minh City.

== Images ==
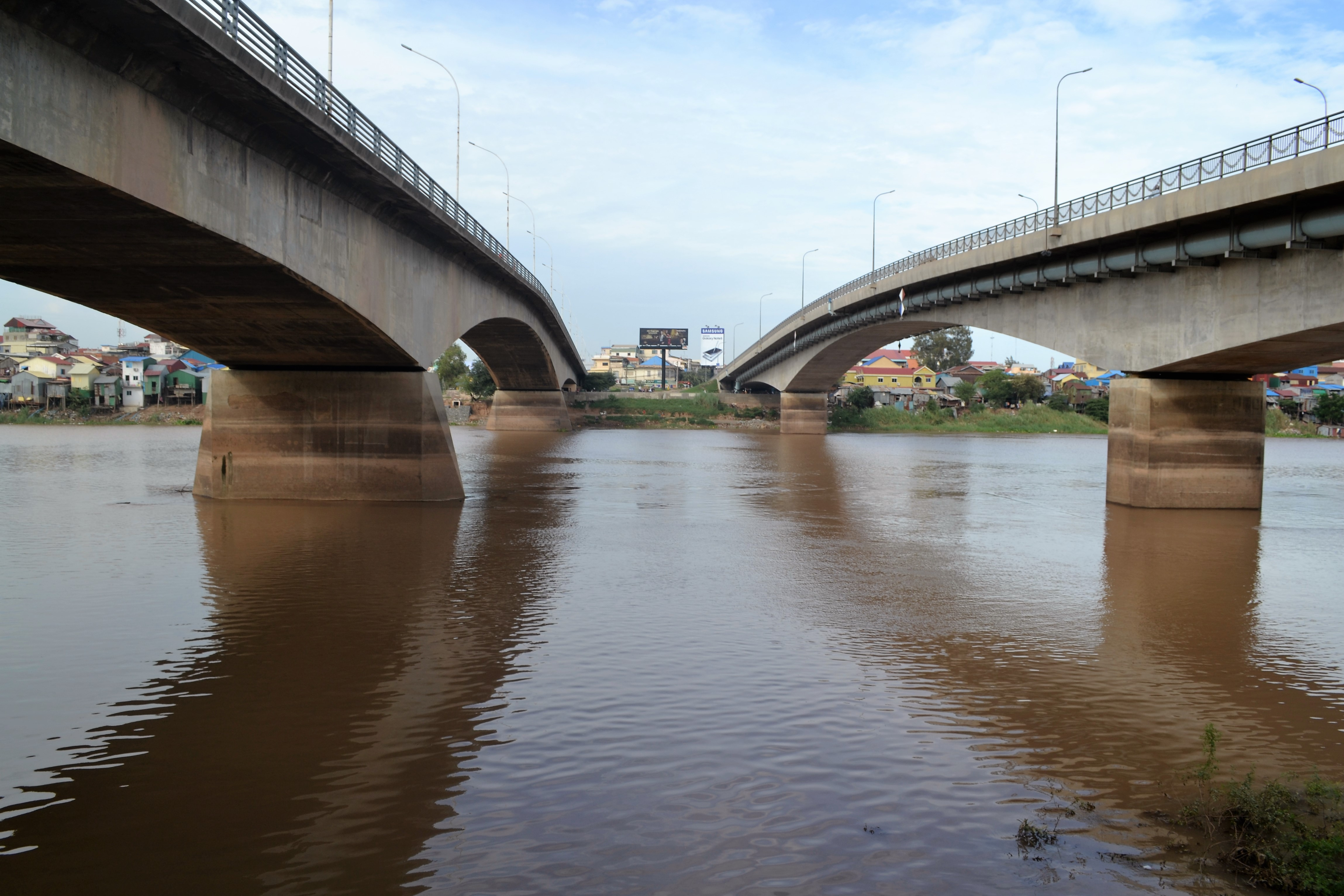
The highway at Monivong Bridge in Phnom Penh

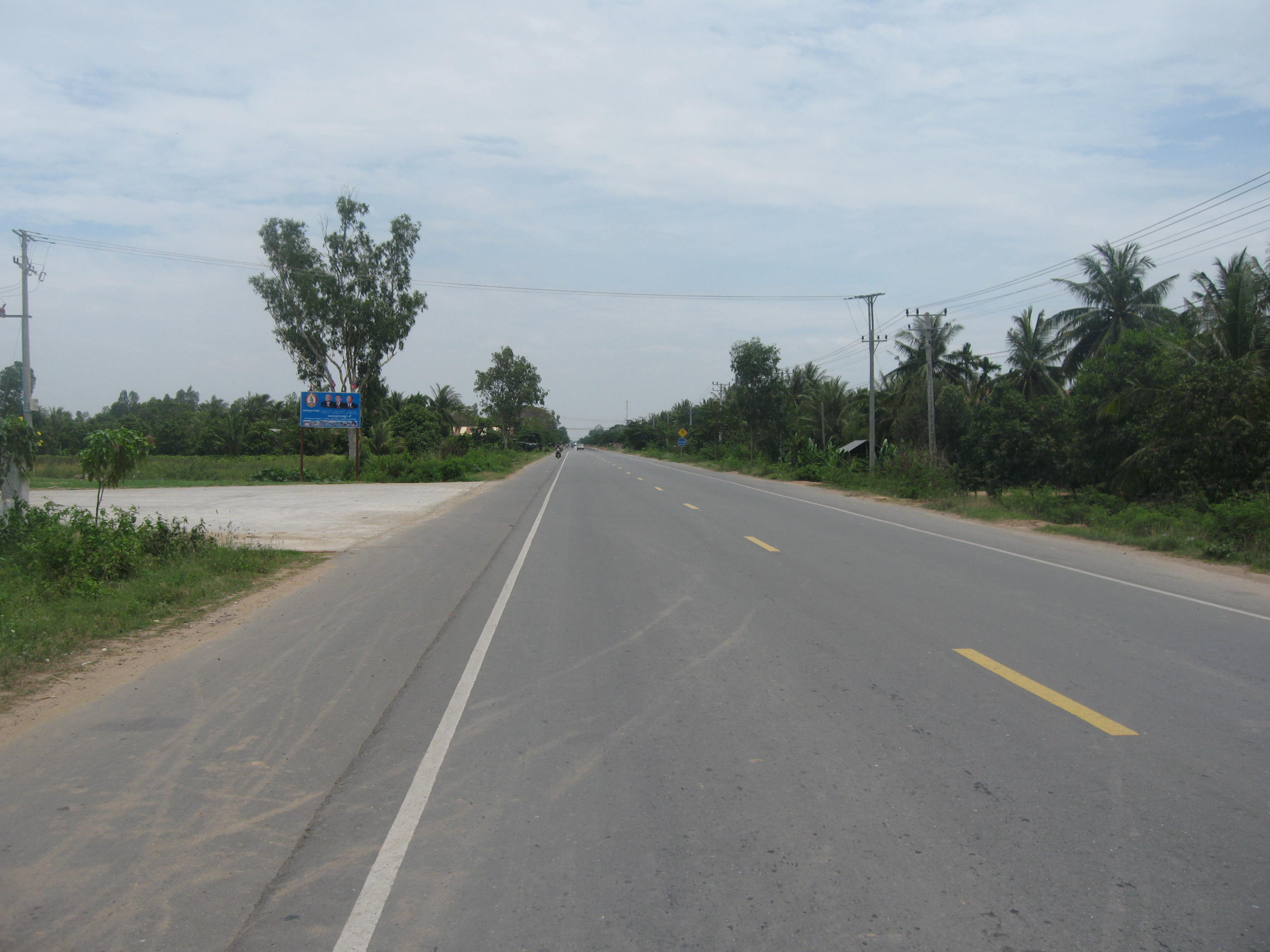
National highway #1 Kien Svay District, Kandal Province, Cambodia

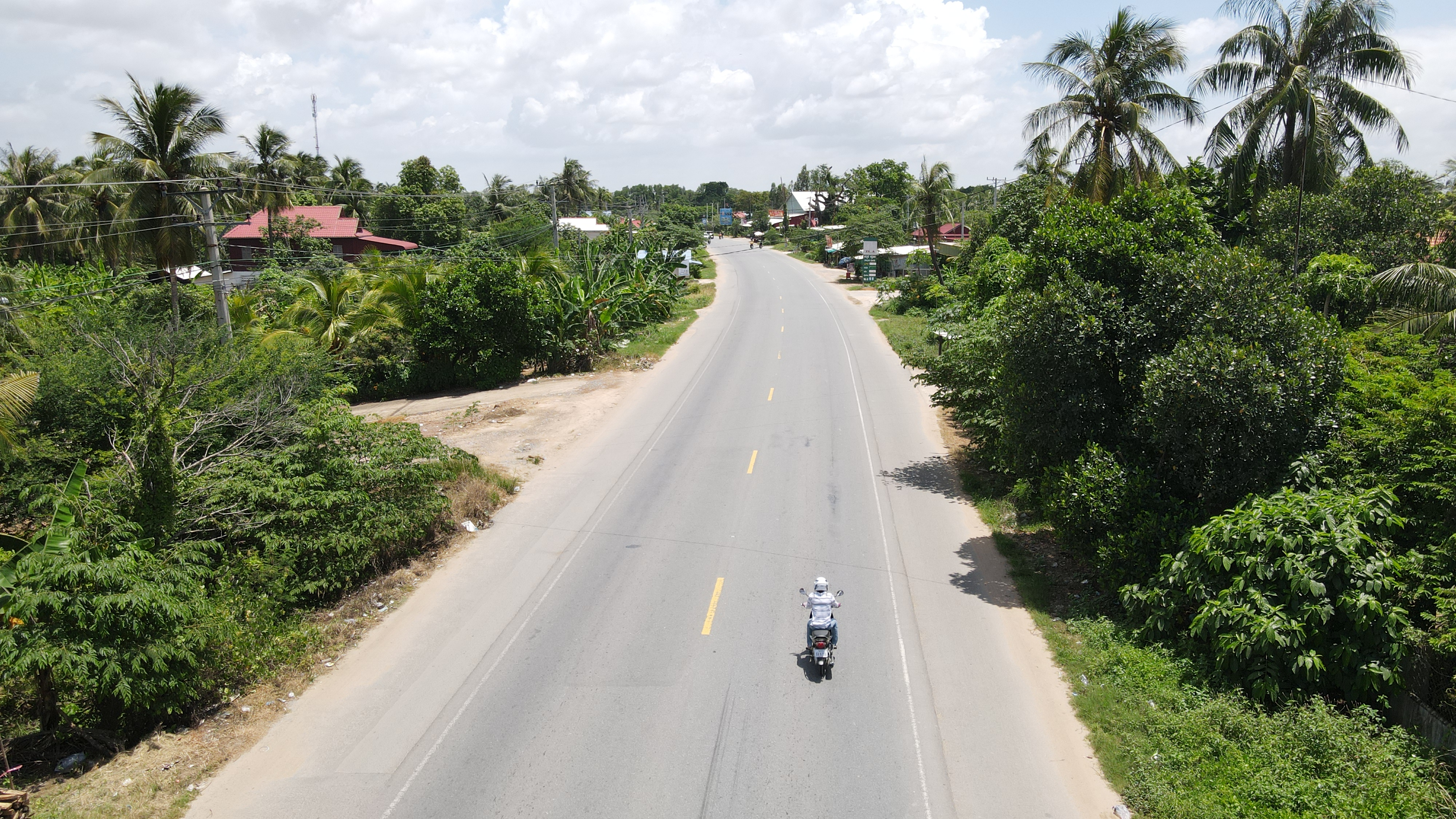
National Highway 1 Kien Svay at KP 44-45

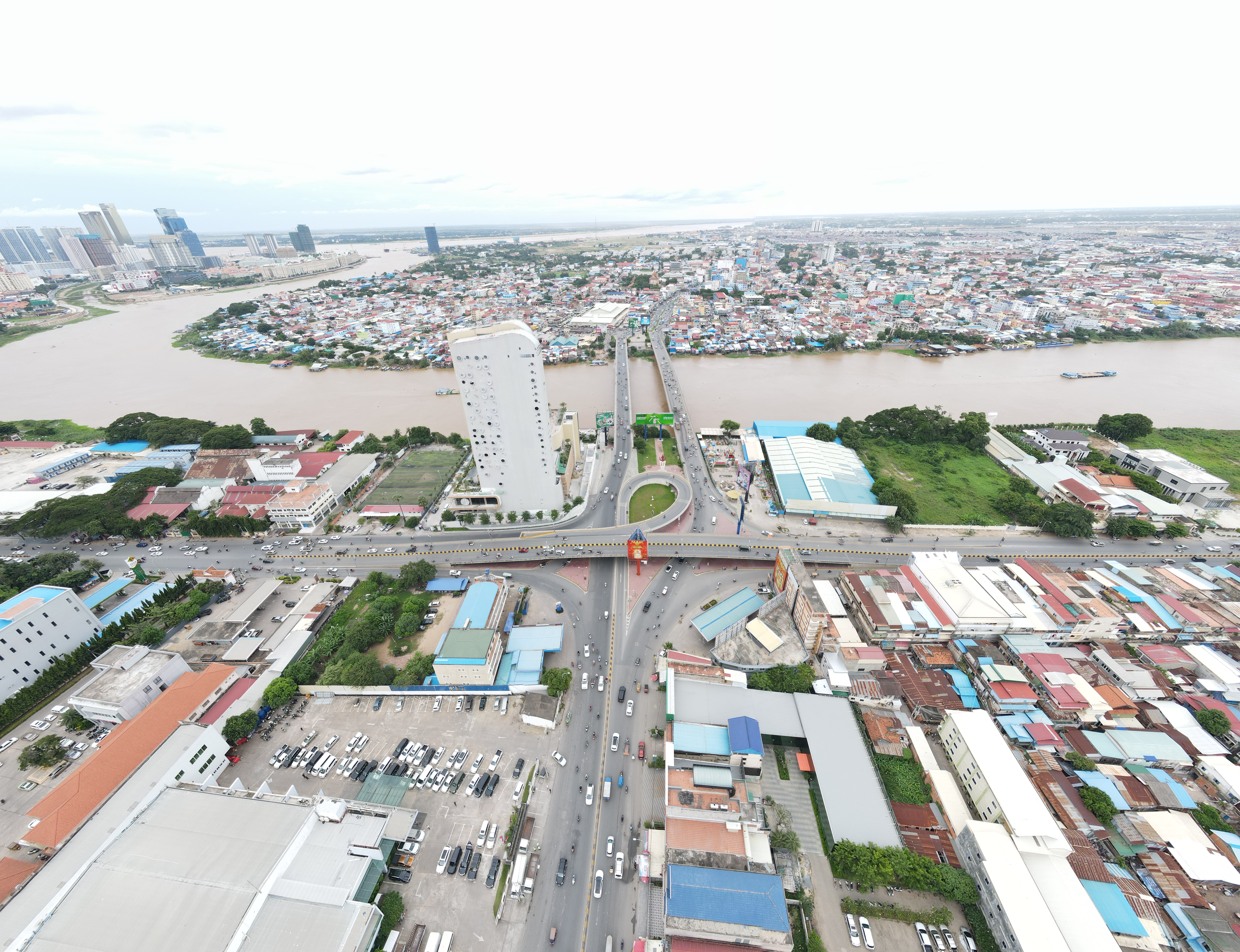
The Start Point of National Highway 1 at Monivong Bridge

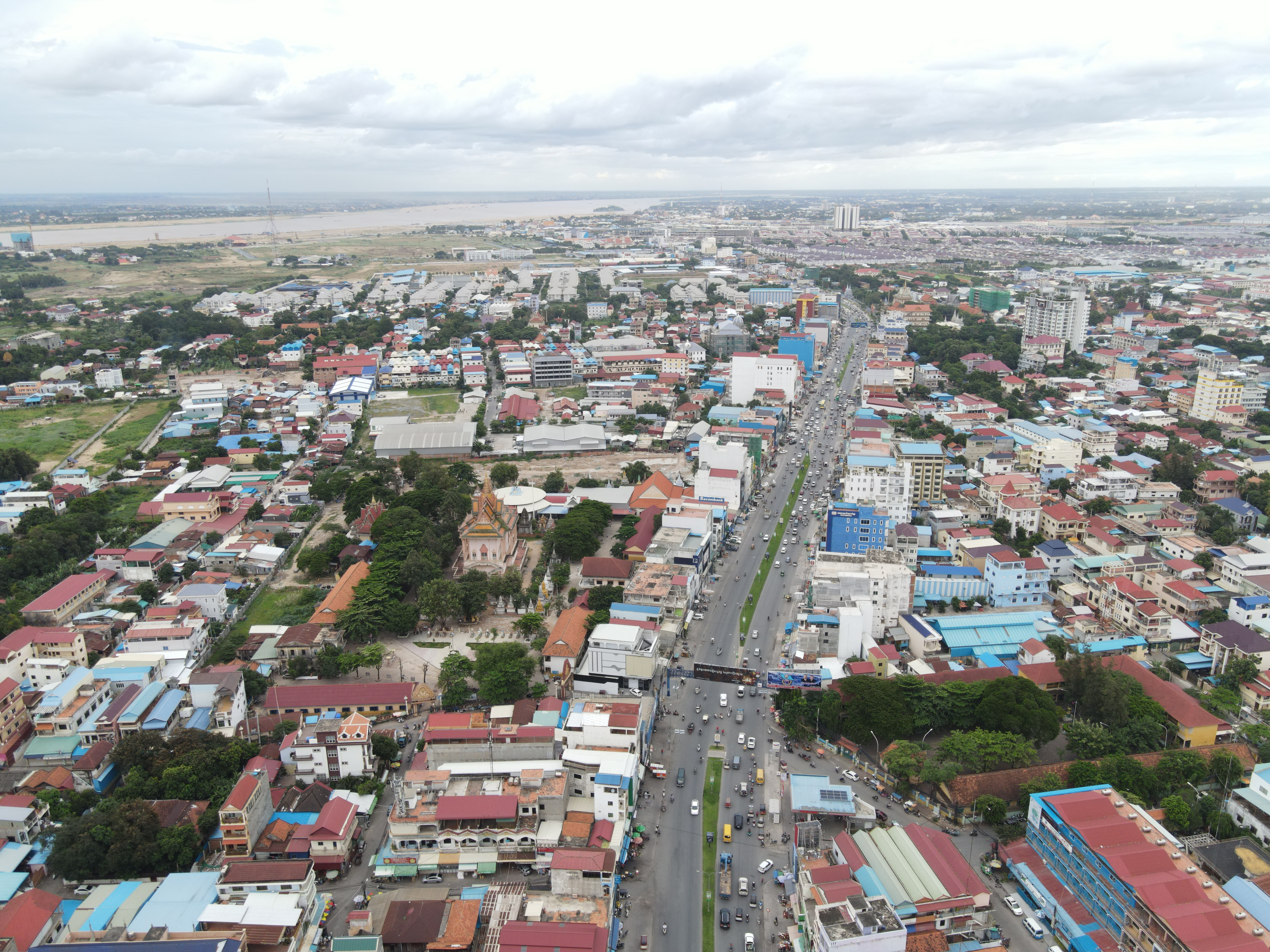
The National Highway 1 at Chbar Ampov Area
