= Monivong Bridge =

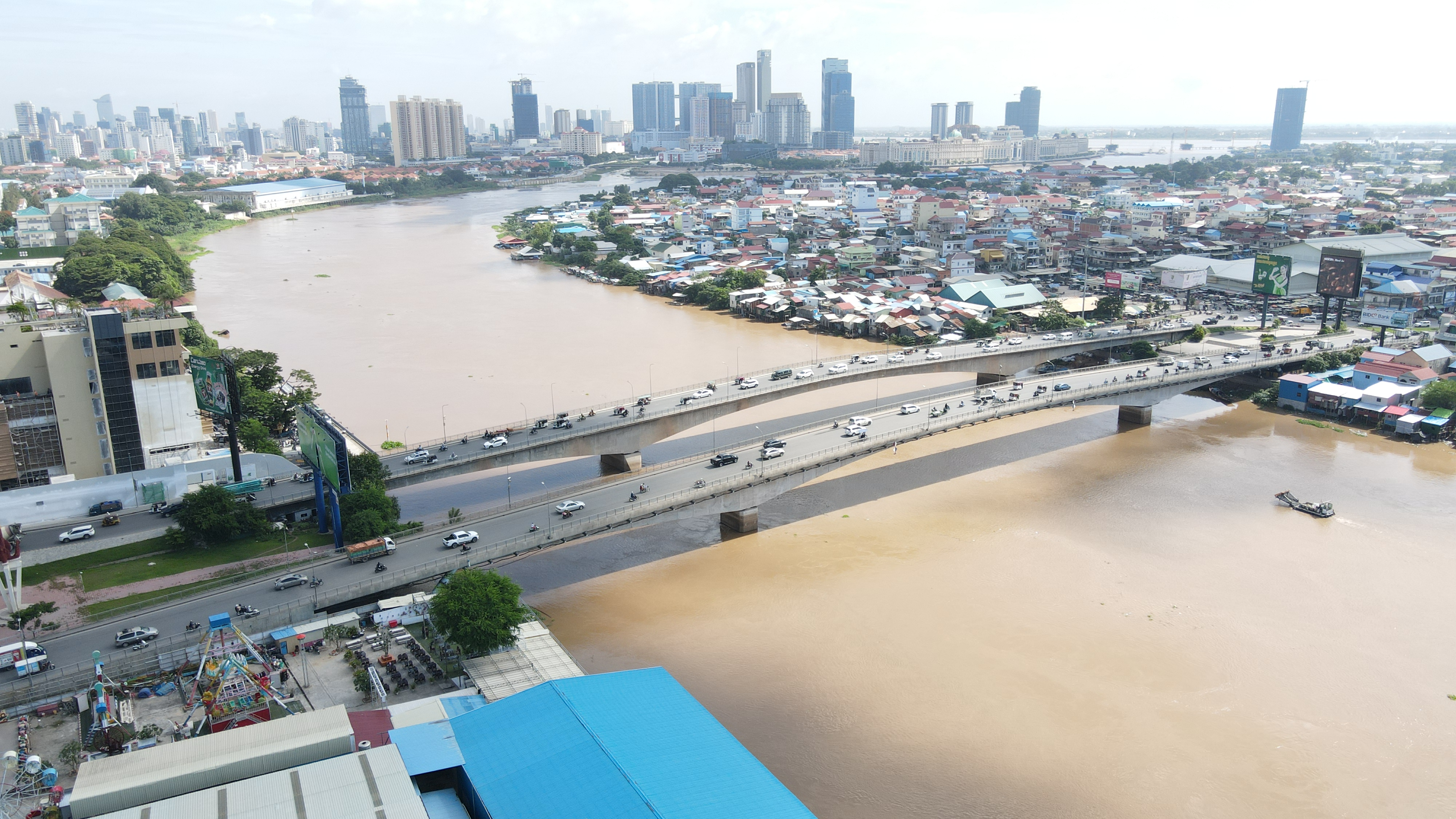
- Bird's Eye View of Preah Monivong Bridge
- Coordinates: 11°31′53″N 104°55′59″E
- Crosses: Bassac River
- Locale: Phnom Penh, Cambodia
- Official name: ស្ពានព្រះមុនីវង្ស

Characteristics
- Total length: 269.5 m
- Width: 2 x 14 m

Location
- Interactive map of Monivong Bridge

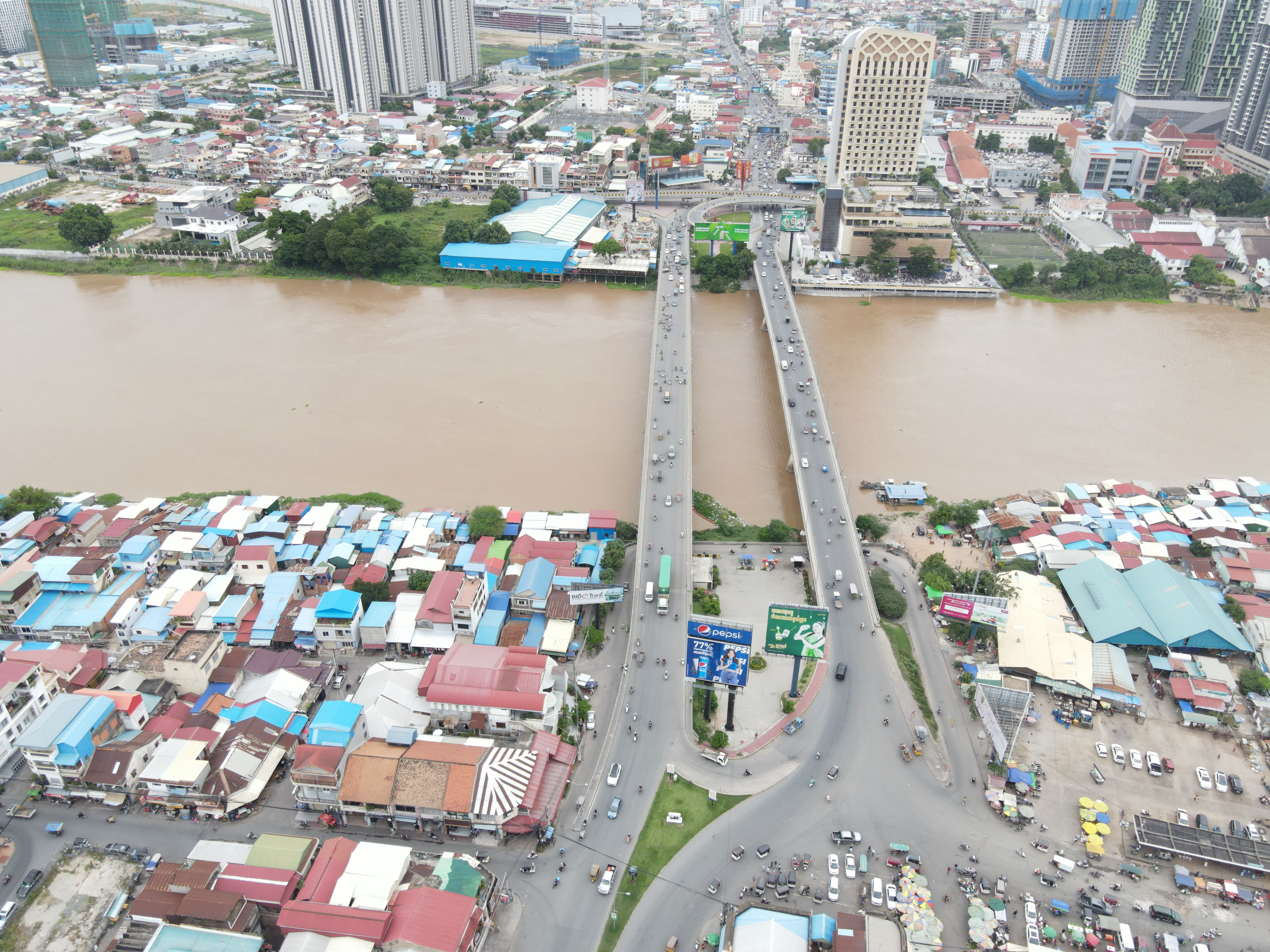
Aerial View of Preah Monivong Bridge View from Chbar Ampov

Monivong Bridge (Khmer: ស្ពានព្រះមុនីវង្ស) is a heavily trafficked bridge in Phnom Penh, Cambodia. It bridges the Bassac River near the end of National Highway 2 to southern Cambodia and lies along the National Highway 1 which connects the city to eastern Cambodia and Vietnam.

On the eastern shore lies the Chhba Ampeou Market.

== Images ==
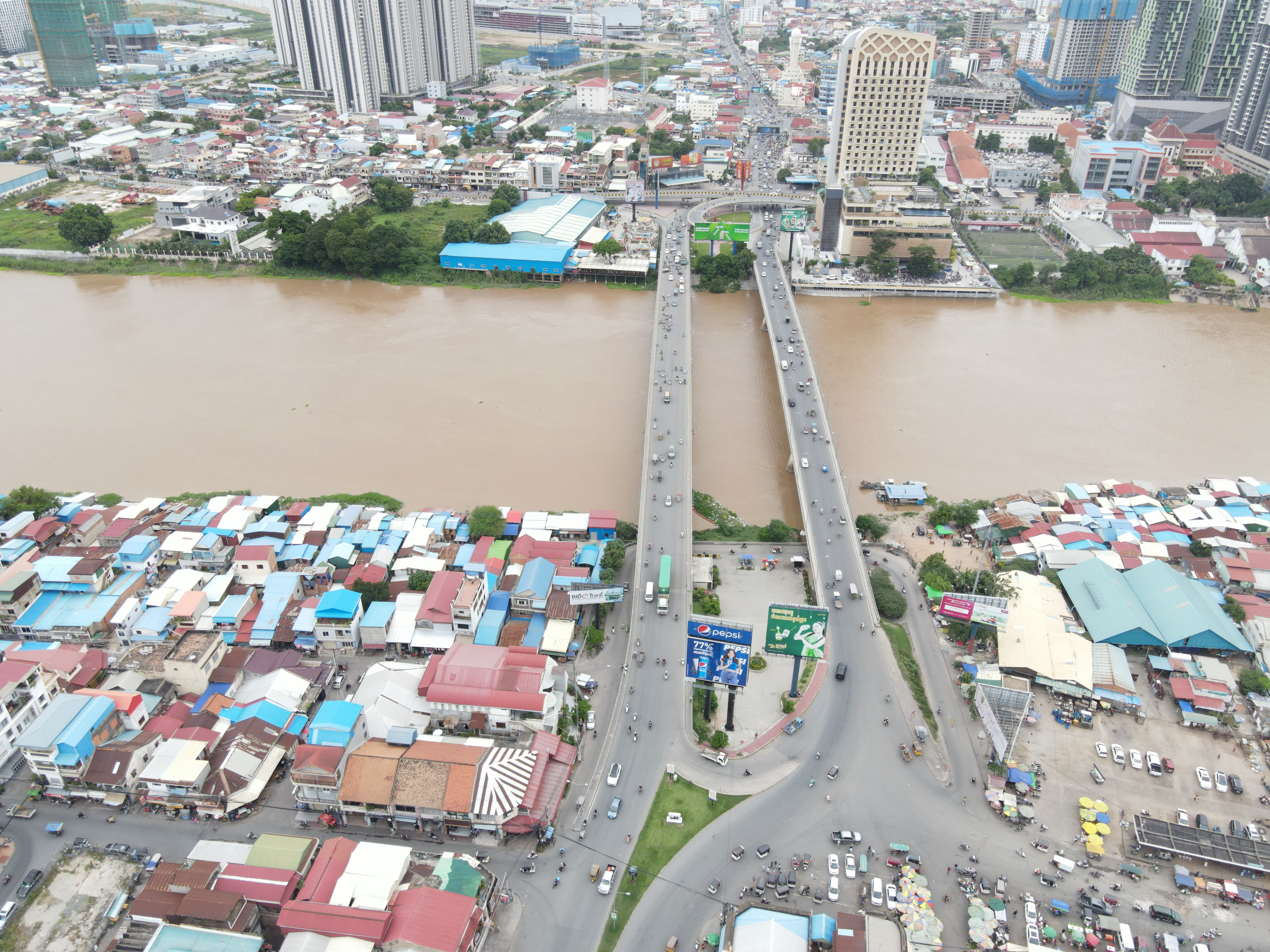
Aerial view of Preah Monivong Bridge View from Chbar Ampov

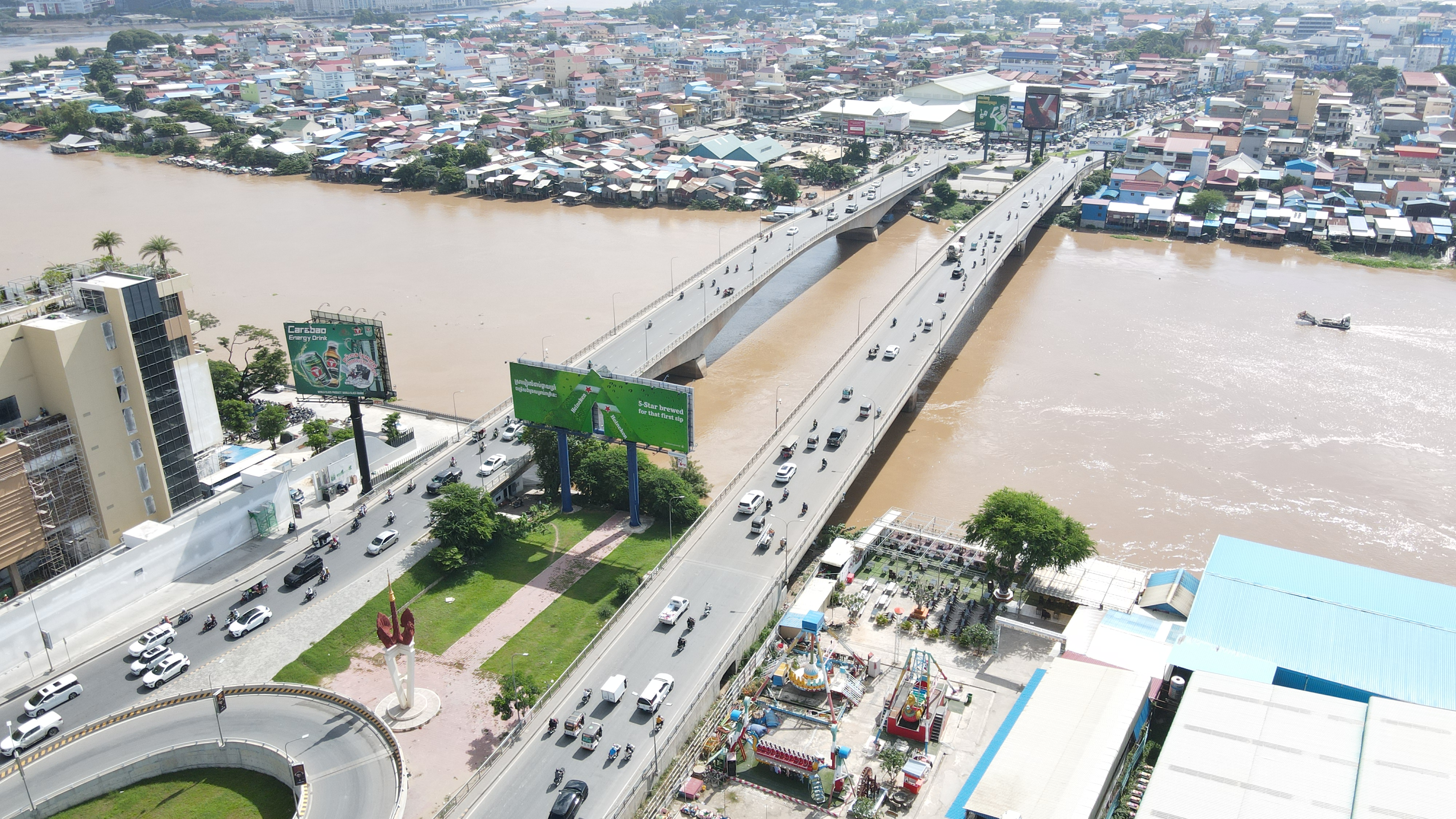
Preah Monivong Bridge View from Flyover

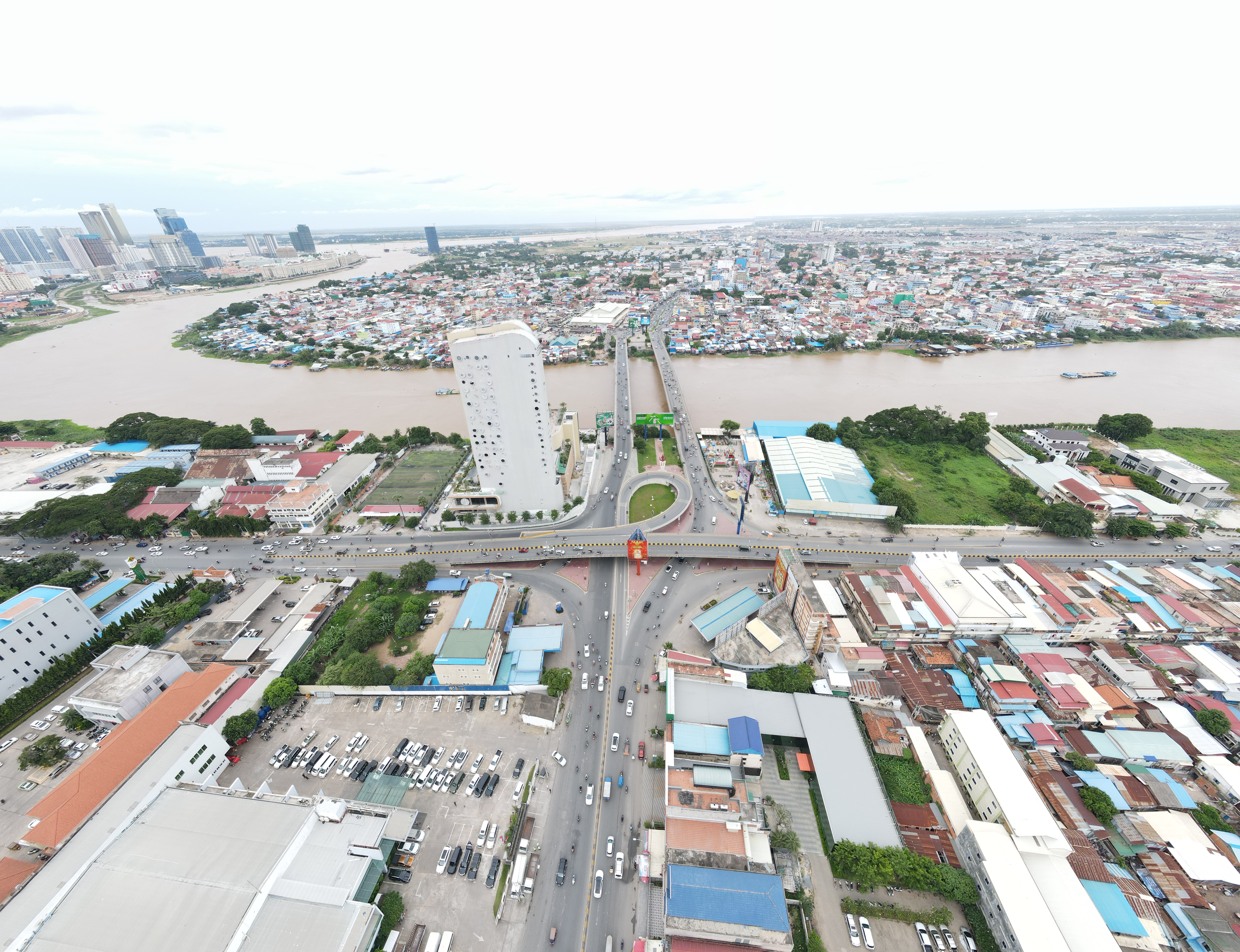
Aerial View of the Bridge and Surrounding Area (Bassac River, Monivong Boulevard etc.)
