= Embassy of France, Phnom Penh =

Diplomatic mission of France to Cambodia

Embassy of France, Phnom Penh ស្ថានទូតបារាំង រាជធានីភ្នំពេញ Ambassade de France, Phnom Penh
- Address: 1 Preah Monivong Blvd
- Coordinates: 11°35′0.25″N 104°54′54.67″E
- Ambassador: S.E. Jacques Pellet
- Website: Official website

The Embassy of France in Cambodia (French: Ambassade de France au Cambodge; Khmer: ស្ថានទូតបារាំងប្រចាំនៅកម្ពុជា) is the primary diplomatic mission of the French Republic to the Kingdom of Cambodia. It is located in the capital Phnom Penh. It is known for the role it played as a place of refuge for foreigners and at-risk Cambodians after the Khmer Rouge takeover in 1975 for several days until foreigners were forced to go to Thailand while the regime forced Cambodians to stay in the country.

== History ==
Until Cambodia's independence from France in 1953, the colonial power was represented in Phnom Penh by a high commissioner, who used a hotel that was purposely built for these activities which was partially funded through the local administrative budget of French Indochina. After independence, the Cambodian government requested that it take ownership of the hotel, and in 1955, an agreement was produced that granted 4.8 hectares of land and leftover assets from the loan used to build the hotel in exchange for the property. The following year, M. Pierre Dafau was chosen to build the embassy complex, with France allocating 250 million francs to the project. Construction started in 1958 and ended in 1961. According to prominent Sangkum-era politician Nhiek Tioulong, the embassy's Technical Cooperation Services department helped build infrastructure as part of a larger French technical aid program.

=== Fall of Phnom Penh and suspension of relations (1975-1991) ===
By March 1975, the embassy had already ceased operations due to the expectation of a Khmer Rouge takeover. After the fall of Phnom Penh on 17 April, the new government did not allow France, as well as most other countries with the exception of a few allies, mostly communist states, to reopen its embassy. However, the embassy remained staffed, led by vice-consul Jean Dyrac, and would become a space of refuge for 600 foreigners and 1,000 Cambodians during and shortly after the battle. By April 26, almost all Cambodians has been forced out, with only foreign journalists and diplomats as well as Cambodian women with a foreign husband remaining and supply aircraft not being allowed to fly in. Dith Pran and Sydney Schanberg, who would later document the extent of the Cambodian genocide, stayed in the embassy along with other refugees; Schanberg stated that the Cambodians were made to leave in two waves, with some (including Pran) being allowed to secretly flee on 18 April and 600 others were handed over to Khmer Rouge authorities on 21 April. The treatment and eviction of Cambodians from the embassy has been the subject of controversy, with Billon Ung Boun Hor, the wife of ex-National Assembly President Ung Bon Hor, suing the French government in 1999; in response, Dyrac stated that the situation meant that turning over Cambodians to the Khmer Rouge was inevitable. Finally, on 30 April, the foreigners were removed from the embassy and trucked to the Thailand border by the Khmer Rouge.

After the fall of the Khmer Rouge and the installation of a Vietnamese-backed government in 1979, the premises were used as an army command post until 1985. Between 1986 and 1991, the chancery served as an orphanage that housed up to 170 children.

=== Modern history (1990-present) ===
Relations were restored following the 1991 Paris Peace Agreements. Philippe Coste was to be appointed as a "permanent representative", as most other countries had agreed to do until the new government held elections. However, he was actually accredited as a full-fledged ambassador in his presentation of credentials on 15 November, which was one of several contentious decisions made by France to enhance its relations with Cambodia at what was considered an early stage of reintegration with the international community. The embassy was initially re-established in another site, but it was announced in 1993 that the former premises, which had been repatriated and were calculated to be 7.5 hectares, would be renovated. This took three years, with the embassy moving back in 1995 and officially opening there in 1996. During the reign of Prince Norodom Ranariddh as Cambodian prime minister, diplomats were denied access to him in retaliation to a warning published for foreign tourists after a series of assaults, with the rape of a French woman by a police officer soon after her arrival being a particularly concerning one. This eventually led to a diplomatic escalation that resulted in a fallout between Ranariddh and France as well as ambassador Le Lidec taking a stricter stance on human rights issues in the country.

== See also ==
- Cambodia-France relations
