= Neak Loeung =

Neak Loeung អ្នកលឿង
- Town
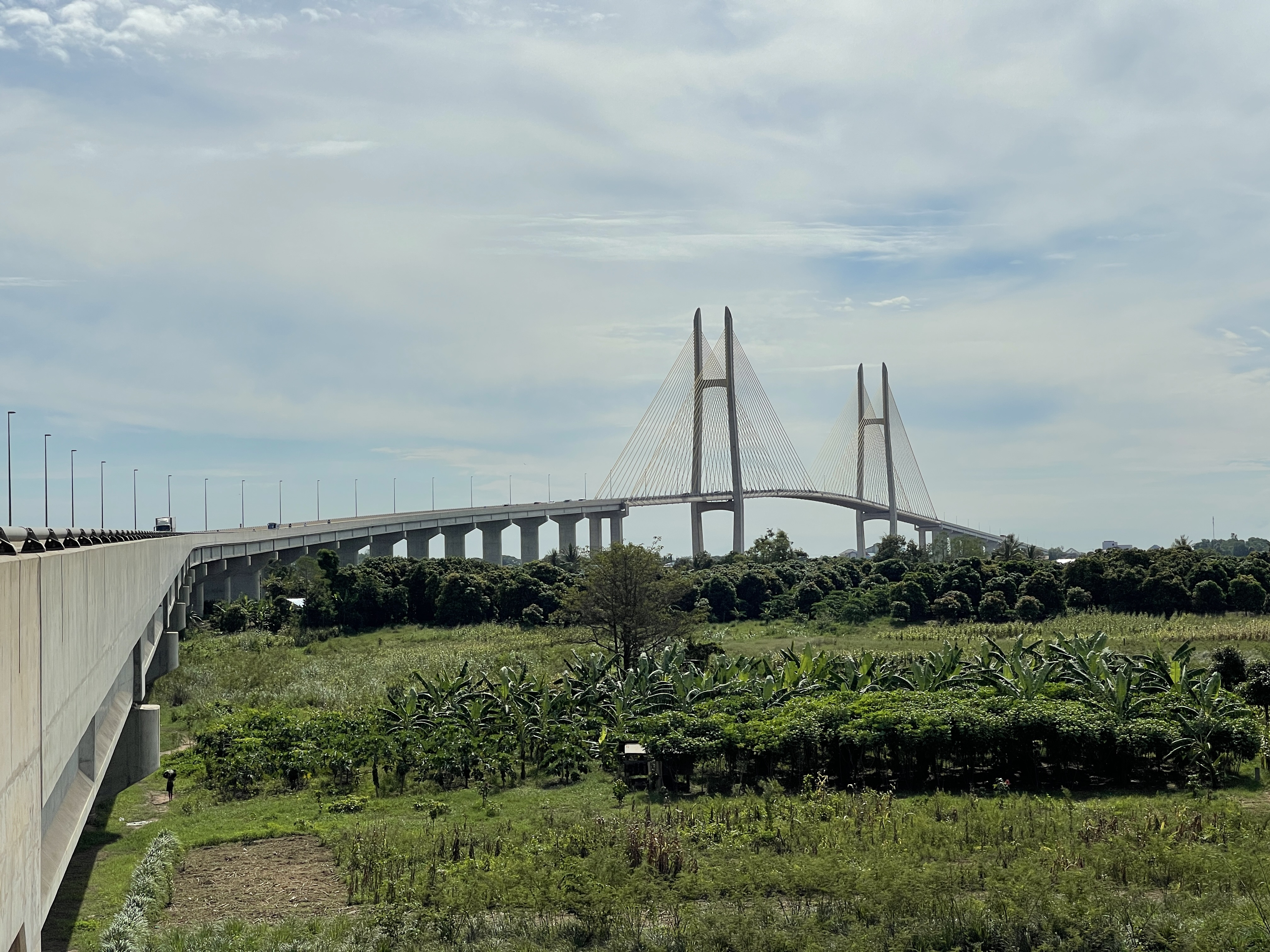

- Location within Cambodia
- Coordinates: 11°15′42″N 105°17′10″E
- Country: Cambodia
- Province: Prey Veng Province
- District: Peam Ror District

Population (1998)
  - Total: 7,109

Neak Loeung (also romanized as Nak Loeung, Khmer: អ្នកលឿង) is a busy commercial town in Prey Veng Province, Cambodia. Located on the Mekong and astride National Highway number 1, it is the commune centre for Neak Leung commune and the capital of Peam Ror District. The town can be reached by car ferry from Kampong Phnum in Kandal Province or by boat along the Mekong river.

Due to its strategic location, the town and port of Neak Leung has been a significant battleground at various times in Cambodia's history. In August 1973, during the Cambodian Civil War, Neak Leung was propelled to the centre of international attention when an American B-52 Stratofortress mistakenly dropped its 20-ton load on the town centre.

== Location ==
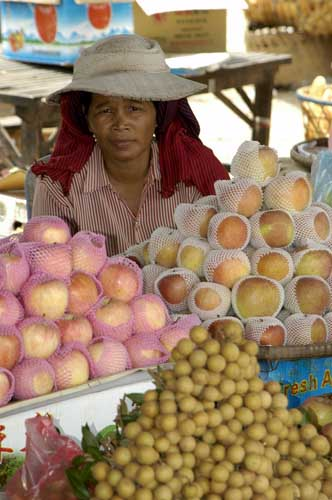
Market at Mekong ferry landing. Neak Loeung, Prey Veng, Cambodia

Neak Leung has grown up at the intersection of several important trade and transport routes. It is located 61 kilometres south east of Phnom Penh on the east bank of the Mekong River. The town straddles National Highway 1, which runs from the capital Phnom Penh to the town of Bavet on the border with Vietnam. National Road 11 begins in Neak Leung and connects the provincial capital at Prey Veng 30 kilometres to the north. This road continues to join National Highway 7 at Thnal Totoung near Kampong Cham town.

A busy market has grown up around the ferry port. There is an abundance of fresh produce available, which includes the products of local farmers and fruits imported from Vietnam by road and river.

== Characteristics ==
Prey Veng province lies on the lower part of the Mekong flood plain. During the rainy season, much of it is severely flooded and is only accessible by boat. Neak Loeung is on slightly higher land and is near the geographic centre of the province. Because of these geographic peculiarities, a number of aid and development agencies have opened offices in Neak Leung, rather than in the provincial capital Prey Veng, as a base for work elsewhere in the province.

The car ferries that cross the Mekong at Neak Leung are an essential part of Cambodia's transport infrastructure. The current vessels were purchased in 1997, as part of a US$20 million grant from the Mekong River Commission to upgrade ferry facilities in Cambodia. Despite the upgrade, there are sometimes significant delays while waiting to cross. If one of the ferries is not operational or traffic is particularly heavy, there may be queues of hundreds of vehicles and a wait of several hours to cross the river.

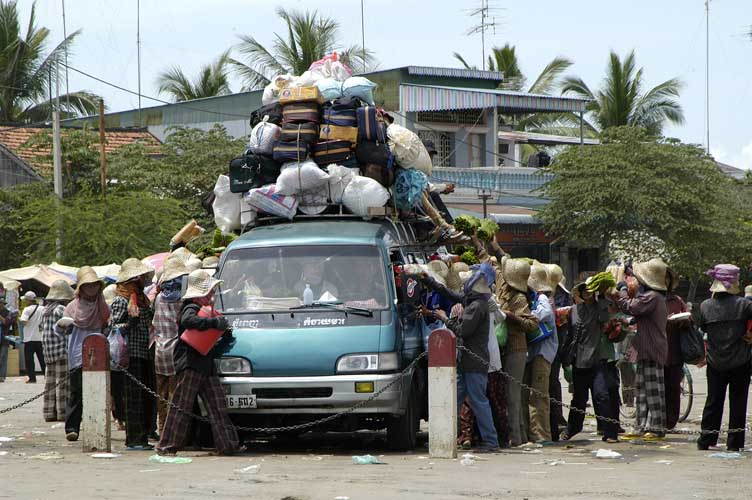
Sellers converge on a heavily laden vehicle waiting for the ferry crossing to Neak Loeung

The first Cambodian bridge across the Mekong was built in Kampong Cham town with Japanese assistance and opened in 2001.

=== Neak Loeung Bridge ===
For many years, the Royal Government of Cambodia (RGC) had been searching for capital to build a second bridge across the Mekong at Neak Leung. Since 2002, the RGC made at least 4 proposals to the government of Japan for funding to build a second bridge over the Mekong at Neak Leung. In June 2007, Prime Minister Hun Sen made an official visit to Japan where he appealed directly for aid from the Japanese government to build the bridge. The Japanese government granted the appeal and the construction plan and environmental impact study were estimated to be completed by the end of 2007. Construction was scheduled to begin 12 February 2011 and cost $118 million. Later it was slated for completion by 2012. The Neak Loeung Bridge, spanning over 2 kilometers, will become Cambodia's longest bridge once completed in early 2015. The bridge was set to be ready for traffic before the Khmer New Year in April 2015. It links two provinces: Kandal and Prey Veng provinces, and is only 61 kilometres southeast of Phnom Penh. Transport Minister Tram Iv Tek said that originally, the government had a plan to send the ferries to the Lvea Em dock [near Phnom Penh]. "It seems that it would not make a profit, so if there is a private [company] that wants to rent them, we will do that,” he said.

As Cambodia's first cable-stayed bridge, it is 2,220 metres long, 13 metres wide, and 37.5 metres above the water level during the rainy season and will have two wide lanes for traffic. Because of its proximity between Vietnam and Thailand, it is hoped to lead to more industrial and factory developments in the province. Land and property prices are expected to rise after the completion of the bridge. The first four months of 2014, land prices along National Highway 1 saw an increase between 10 and 20 percent.

== Vietnam War era bombing incident ==
On August 6, 1973, during the Cambodian Civil War and Vietnam War, Neak Leung was propelled to the centre of international attention when an American B-52 Stratofortress mistakenly dropped its 20-ton load on the town centre. At least 137 Cambodians were killed and another 268 were wounded. More than 30 craters stretched for a mile down the main street and a third of the town was completely destroyed while another third was heavily damaged. Neak Leung market and a large army barracks in the town were also destroyed. This incident was depicted by director Roland Joffé in his 1984 film The Killing Fields.
