= Khmer Rouge insurgency =

1979–1998 armed conflict in Cambodia

Khmer Rouge Insurgency
- Part of the Third Indochina War and the Cold War
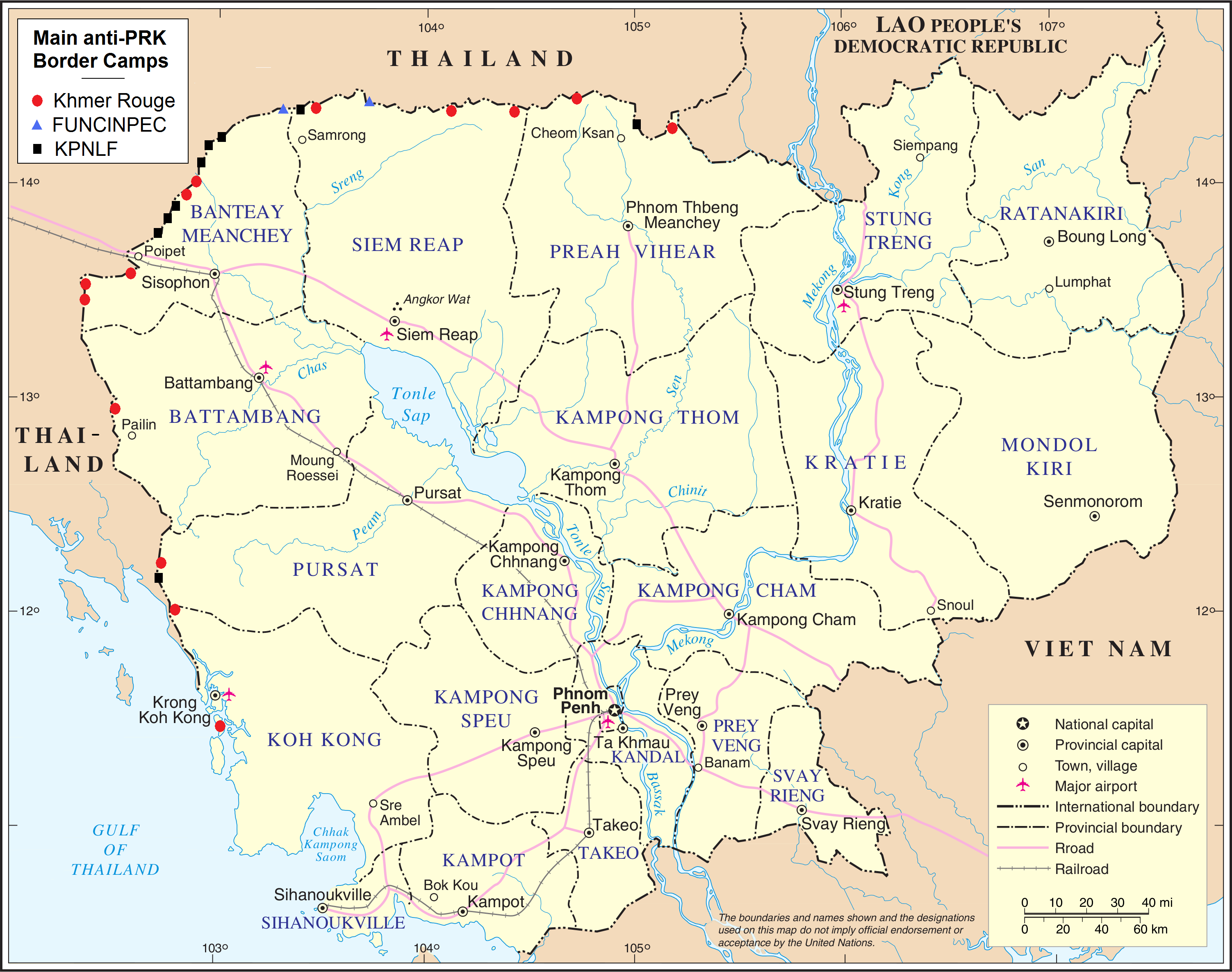
- Resistance bases within the borders of Cambodia with Thailand
Date	First Phase: January 7, 1979 – November 1, 1991 (12 years, 9 months, 3 weeks and 4 days); Second Phase: February 1, 1993 – April 15, 1998 (5 years, 2 months and 2 weeks)
Location	Cambodia, eastern border of Thailand
Result	Cambodian government victory; Vietnamese withdrawal in the stalemate of 1989; 1991 Paris Peace Agreements; End of communism and restoration of a multi-party constitutional monarchy in 1993; Restart of the conflict in 1993; 1997 coup; Death of Pol Pot in 1998; Dissolution of the Khmer Rouge in 1999

Belligerents
Coalition Government of Democratic Kampuchea (until 1992): Khmer Rouge; KPNLF (until 1992); FUNCINPEC (1981–1992); Supported by: Thailand; PGNUNSC (from 1993)	People's Republic of Kampuchea (1979–1989); Vietnam (1979–1989) State of Cambodia (1989–1992) UNTAC (1992–93) Kingdom of Cambodia (from 1993) Supported by: Vietnam (from 1989)

Commanders and leaders
Pol Pot # Son Sen (executed); Ta Mok (surrendered); Son Sann (until 1992); Norodom Sihanouk (until 1992); Norodom Ranariddh (until 1992)	Heng Samrin; Hun Sen; Norodom Sihanouk (from 1993); Norodom Ranariddh (1993–1997)

Units involved
20,000–30,000 CGDK soldiers 10,000 KPNLF soldiers 6,000 soldiers from Sihanoukist National Army 10,000 CGDK soldiers (1993)	150,000–220,000 soldiers About 30,000 Cambodian soldiers

The Khmer Rouge insurgency was an armed conflict in Cambodia and eastern border of Thailand that began in 1979 when the Khmer Rouge-ruled government of Democratic Kampuchea was deposed during the Cambodian–Vietnamese War. Between 1979 and the 1991 Paris Peace Agreements, the war was fought between the Vietnam-supported People's Republic of Kampuchea and an opposing coalition. After 1991, the unrecognized Khmer Rouge government and insurgent forces continued to fight against the new government of Cambodia from remote areas until their defeat in 1998. The remaining Khmer Rouge forces surrendered in 1999.

After the fall of the Khmer Rouge regime, Cambodia came under Vietnamese military occupation, and a pro-Hanoi, Soviet government known as the People's Republic of Kampuchea (PRK) was formed, led by the Kampuchean United Front for National Salvation. The conflict was fought during the 1980s between the People's Republic of Kampuchea and the Coalition Government of Democratic Kampuchea (CGDK). The latter was a government-in-exile formed in 1981 that was composed of three Cambodian political factions: the royalist FUNCINPEC party led by Prince Norodom Sihanouk, the Party of Democratic Kampuchea (often referred to as the Khmer Rouge), and the Khmer People's National Liberation Front (KPNLF). The Khmer Rouge representative at the UN, Thiounn Prasith, was maintained.

Throughout the 1980s, the CGDK, supported by China, Thailand, the United States, the United Kingdom, and others, continued to control significant territory and launch operations against Vietnamese forces and the PRK. Vietnam withdrew from Cambodia in 1989. Peace efforts intensified between 1989 and 1991, with two international conferences in Paris and a UN peacekeeping mission that helped maintain a ceasefire. The UN issued a mandate known as the United Nations Transitional Authority in Cambodia (APRONUC) to enforce a ceasefire and deal with the issue of refugees and disarmament.

In 1992, economic sanctions against Cambodia, imposed by the United States and its allies in 1975, were lifted. As part of the peace effort, UN-sponsored elections were held in 1993, which helped restore stability, and cement the gradual decline of the Khmer Rouge. However, a low-intensity conflict continued between the Cambodian army and Khmer Rouge guerrillas until 1998. Norodom Sihanouk was restored as the king of Cambodia in 1993, but the situation intensified following a coup in 1997. A coalition government formed after national elections in 1998, bringing political stability and leading to the surrender of the remaining Khmer Rouge forces that year.

== The conflict ==
After the fall of the Khmer Rouge and the conflict with Vietnam, Cambodia's economic situation was disastrous. During the first six months of 1979, approximately 80,000 people fled from Cambodia to reach Thailand. Many refugees died as a result of anti-personnel mines while attempting to cross into Thailand, and many of those who did survive were turned away by Thai authorities. The refugees were forced into camps, especially in Preah Vihear province, where living conditions were precarious. Cambodia's food situation worsened further, with Vietnamese troops attacking during the rice harvest, and food stocks being looted by the two belligerent parties. From August 1979 onward, the exile of the Cambodians became truly cataclysmic. Over one million people driven by hunger moved to the Thai border. The Khmer Rouge also sent its worst-off troops to the refugee camps where humanitarian aid, which flowed to the camps through the Royal Thai Armed Forces, contributed to helping the Khmer Rouge troops get back on their feet. After the first wave of refugees came to Thailand, between 100,000 and 300,000 civilians remained sheltered in camps on the Thai border, along a strip of around 30 kilometres. Anti-Vietnamese forces were supplied by China, primarily with small arms, through Thailand. At the international level, the entry of Vietnamese troops into Cambodia was condemned by most countries under pressure from China and the U.S., which wished to prevent Vietnam from establishing itself as a dominant power in Southeast Asia. The UN did not recognise the People's Republic of Kampuchea, and following a vote in November 1979, the body considered Democratic Kampuchea to be Cambodia's sole legitimate government.

Starting in 1983, Margaret Thatcher's government sent elements of the British SAS, the Special Air Service, to train the Khmer Rouge in landmine technologies. The U.S. and UK also imposed an embargo on Cambodia, resulting in serious consequences for the economy.

Thailand, which had been accepting refugees, opened the Khao I Dang camp in Sa Kaeo province on 19 November 1979, about ten kilometres from Cambodia where 150,000 people would soon arrive. Thailand intended to recruit all Cambodian men of military age to form a force capable of repelling a possible Vietnamese attack. Around 250,000 other Cambodians preferred to stay in no-man's land between the two countries.

Prince Norodom Sihanouk, placed under house arrest by the Khmer Rouge in 1976, was taken from his palace during the Vietnamese offensive to be evacuated by plane to China. In the summer, an armed group favourable to the former monarch, the Movement for the National Liberation of Kampuchea (MOULINAKA), was founded on the border with Thailand to fight against the Vietnamese. Former corvette operations captain, Kong Siloah, led it until his death in August 1980. Different groups of the Khmer Serei, or "Free Khmers", that carried out guerrilla operations against the Khmer Rouge between 1975 and 1979, also organized themselves to fight the Vietnamese.

Son Sann, former prime minister of Sihanouk, brought together several Khmer Serei and soldiers who took refuge in the West to found the National Front for the Liberation of the Khmer People (KPNLF). In April 1979, it had around ten thousand refugees transported by the Thai army to the mountainous region of Sok Sann, opposite the province of Chanthaburi, which he declared a "liberated zone" and from where he launched appeals to his compatriots.

Son Sann contacted Norodom Sihanouk in January 1979 so that he could take over the leadership of his troops, but the prince refused on several occasions. In early 1981, Sihanouk created, with the support of ASEAN countries, an organization intended to lead anti-Vietnamese resistance, known as the National United Front for an Independent, Neutral, Peaceful, and Cooperative Cambodia (FUNCINPEC). Organized in March 1981, a group of his followers transported MOULINAKA troops to Khmer territory on the Thai border near the province of Surin. Former troops of Kong Siloah joined the prince's ten thousand supporters, with whom they founded the National Sihanoukist Army, which constituted the armed wing of FUNCINPEC.

During the summer of 1979, the Khmer Rouge took advantage of the monsoon that hampered the movement of Vietnamese troops to reorganize themselves to launch offensives, renaming their armed forces the National Army of Democratic Kampuchea. In July, Pol Pot installed his new headquarters, Bureau 131, under the flank of Mount Thom. The Khmer Rouge benefited from the assistance of Thai special forces, which ensured the training and recruitment of the Khmer armed forces. In 1979, Khieu Samphan assumed the leadership of a new body that took the place of the government in exile, the Front of the Grand National Democratic Patriotic Union of Kampuchea. Pol Pot was content with his more discreet role as commander of the armed forces and did not make any public appearances after 1980.

Three Cambodian resistance movements against the Vietnamese invasion coexisted from 1981 onward. This included the Khmer Rouge and its National Army of Democratic Kampuchea, led by Pol Pot and numbering 20 to 30,000 men, Son Sann's KPNLF with 10,000 men, and the Sihanoukist Nationalist Army with 6,000 men. Each of these three movements extended their power over some Cambodian refugee camps. The Sihanoukist guerrillas had no supply problems, but their poor performance in the field prevented them from extending their authority to a significant number of civilians. At first, Sihanoukist forces were practically non-existent. Prince Norodom Ranariddh, one of Sihanouk's sons, was installed in Bangkok as his father's special representative. He would be appointed commander-in-chief of the ANS, without any military qualifications. Ranariddh depended on the Khmer Rouge, whom he provided funds, and in return guaranteed the formation of the ANS. It was only gradually that the Sihanoukist National Army, like the FNLPK, distinguished itself by true feats of arms.

The Vietnamese occupation force numbered around 200,000 troops in 1981. They were also responsible for training the army of the People's Republic of Kampuchea, the People's Revolutionary Armed Forces of Kampuchea, which initially numbered around 30,000 men. The U.S. gave the People's Republic of China a carte blanche on the Cambodian problem and continued to recognize Democratic Kampuchea as the government of Cambodia, mostly to mark its opposition to the USSR-supported Vietnamese occupation. The UK and U.S., through Thailand, supported the Khmer Rouge as well as other guerrilla movements against the Vietnamese. Under American leadership, the World Food Program provided approximately US$12 million in food to the Khmer Rouge through the Thai army. The USSR appeared to be quite overwhelmed by the situation in Cambodia. By supporting Vietnam, the Soviet military gained access to the ports on the Vietnamese coast. The Soviet government was not very active in Cambodia, since their attention was monopolized at the same time by the Euromissile crisis and the War in Afghanistan.

Atrocities committed by the Khmer Rouge seriously damaged their international credibility. To make them more presentable in the eyes of the international community, China urged them to ally themselves again with Norodom Sihanouk, a more acceptable personality in the eyes of the West. On the other hand, China and the U.S. only agreed to subsidize the Sihanoukist resistance if the prince formed an anti-Vietnamese coalition with the Khmer Rouge, which could provide him with troops. Sihanouk initially refused any idea of a new coalition with Pol Pot's men, as several of his children and grandchildren had disappeared between 1975 and 1979. However, in 1981, noticing that the Khmer Rouge were successfully resisting Vietnamese offensives to dislodge them from their strongholds, he agreed to ally with them again to have a chance to return to power. On 4 September 1981, Sihanouk, Khieu Samphân, and Son Sann published a joint statement announcing the formation of a coalition government to liberate Cambodia from "Vietnamese aggressors". With the need for broader unity against Vietnam, a unity that an explicit communist line would hamper, in December 1981, the Khmer Rouge established the Party of Democratic Kampuchea to replace the Communist Party of Kampuchea and de jure abandoned Marxism-Leninism to choose democratic socialism. Under the encouragement of China, which threatened to stop delivering weapons. The three factions formed the Coalition Government of Democratic Kampuchea (GCKD) on June 21, 1982, in Kuala Lumpur. The new faction would be chaired by Sihanouk and recognized by the UN. Son Sann would become the Prime Minister and Khieu Samphân the Deputy Prime Minister responsible for foreign affairs. This government would be recognized by the international community (except for the communist Eastern Bloc and COMECON countries) and maintained ambassadors to the UN and France. The GCKD served, in practice, as a political front to hide the international aid being given to the Khmer Rouge, which remained the most powerful military partner of the anti-Vietnamese coalition.

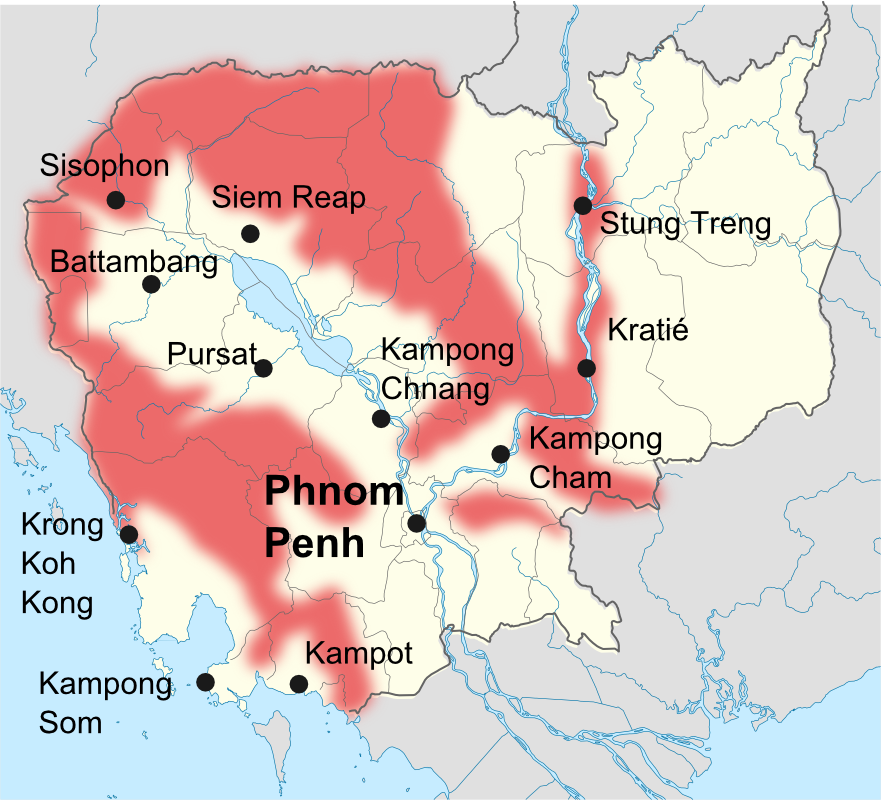
Map of the activity of the Khmer Rouge in Cambodia (1989-1990)

Guerrilla movements continued to carry out their actions along the border with Thailand. Khmer Rouge troops continued to invest in remote and mountainous areas and install anti-personnel mines, which caused many casualties among the civilian population. Son Sann and Sihanouk's goal was to exist militarily and then weigh in on any future negotiations. The ongoing conflict unfolded on a seasonal schedule. Each year, during the dry season, the Vietnamese People's Army attacked guerrilla camps, sometimes penetrating far into Thai territory. During the rainy season, the absence of paved roads immobilized Vietnamese mechanized units. This allowed the guerrillas to launch incursions into Cambodian territory. Starting in 1984, the Vietnamese mobilized the Cambodian population in a vast enterprise of passive defense. For three months, six months, or a year, civilians were forced to build roads to the west of the country, fortify villages, cut down forests, and dig protective dikes along the Thai border and part of the border with Laos.

The army of the People's Republic of Kampuchea, poorly motivated and forced to operate under the leadership of the Vietnamese army, suffered many desertions. Defensive measures organized by the Vietnamese army, built with the assistance of locals, were effective at repelling GCKD forces. The Khmer Rouge, the KPNLF, and the ANS were unable to regain their position within the country, where the presence of many Vietnamese in the cities and some camps further complicated their task. Vietnamese soldiers were also unable to put an end to the activities of the rebel movements, especially because China provoked Vietnam with border incidents – around 3,750 between 1979 and 1982 – in the Tonkin region.

Vietnam was forced to further reinforce its military personnel, which resulted in dependence on Soviet supplies. Military spending represented 20% of Vietnam's GDP. Vietnam would end up taking around 17.5% of military aid and 20% of economic aid provided by the USSR to the Third World. The U.S. financed Son Sann's KPNLF to increase Vietnam's stagnation in Cambodia. The Vietnamese threat also allowed the KPNLF to strengthen military cooperation with ASEAN countries. By the mid-1980s, the Cambodian conflict reached a military stalemate and increasingly weighed on Vietnamese and Soviet finances.

In April 1983, the Vietnamese People's Armed Forces launched an offensive on the Cambodian-Thai border, provoking a response from the Royal Thai Army, which shelled Vietnamese positions. In late 1984, the Vietnamese army attacked resistance bases with heavy weapons that it had not used for five years. In January 1985, the Vietnamese captured the Ampil base held by the FLNKP and the Phnom Malai base held by the Khmer Rouge which were on the border with Thailand. The Thai army retaliated and saw one of its helicopters shot down by the Vietnamese. This fighting provoked an additional exodus of refugees into camps in Thailand. Around 200,000 civilians fled to Thailand in 1985. These military losses weakened the political weight of the resistance. The defeat was a painful setback for Son Sann's troops, while the Sihanoukist National Army gained a positive reputation in battles, where they were only defeated because of the retreat of the Thai army, which allowed the Vietnamese to catch his troops from the rear.

Deprived of their main bases, the forces of the Khmer Rouge-KPNLF-ANS coalition took refuge in the jungle and continued carrying out guerrilla operations. If the Cambodian resistance was not in a position to militarily endanger the Vietnamese army, continued fighting would impede the country's normalization and exert political pressure on Vietnam. The Vietnamese were interested in a negotiated exit from this endless and costly conflict, but they demanded the exclusion of the Khmer Rouge in future negotiations. Similarly, the Cambodian resistance coalition demanded the exclusion of the Vietnamese.

On September 2, 1985, Pol Pot, having reached the age of sixty, announced his retirement and left command of the Armed Forces to Son Sen. However, he assigned himself the role of presidency of a "Higher Institute of National Defense", a position with vague responsibilities but which seemed to indicate that the former general secretary of the Communist Party of Kampuchea maintained leadership of the Khmer Rouge troops. Around 10,000 men remained in practice under the command of Pol Pot, who operated from a camp located in Thailand. Ta Mok also led 10,000 men in the O Trao region. Khieu Samphan and Ieng Sary, in turn, commanded troops in the Battambang region and in Thai territory. China, willing to put the USSR in difficult situations in the region, continued to fuel the Khmer Rouge rebellion without openly approving Pol Pot's "excesses" as it once had.

== Peace process ==
Mikhail Gorbachev's coming to power in the USSR marked a turning point in Soviet foreign policy. The USSR, now seeking to safeguard its economy and get rid of costly peripheral conflicts such as financing the Cambodian conflict, the War in Afghanistan, the Angolan conflict, or allied regimes such as Cuba. The new Soviet leader also expressed, in a speech delivered on July 24, 1986, the desire for rapprochement with the People's Republic of China, with which the Cambodian conflict remains the main dispute. Vietnam, which was also experiencing economic difficulties, realised that it could not count for long on the support of the USSR, whose help was financially essential to continue the war: it accelerated the withdrawal of its troops from Cambodia, which had already begun several years earlier.

Pol Pot's official withdrawal in the mid-1980s completed the conditions for the opening of peace negotiations, allowing Son Sann to propose to the government of the People's Republic of Kampuchea the opening of negotiations with the coalition of resistance forces.

In 1987, France and Australia launched for the possibility of an international conference responsible for drawing up a peace plan. Negotiations were however, destined to stumble for several years due to the role reserved for the Khmer Rouge. On December 2, 1987, in Fère-en-Tardenois, then on January 20–21, 1988 in Saint-Germain-en-Laye, Norodom Sihanouk and Cambodian Prime Minister Hun Sen met to reach an agreement on the opening of negotiations between all resistance factions and the Phnom Penh government. Norodom Sihanouk refused to hold elections in Cambodia until the People's Republic of Kampuchea regime was reformed and renamed.

In July 1988, representatives of the KPNLF, the Khmer Rouge, FUNCINPEC, and the government of the People's Republic of Kampuchea met in Bogor, Indonesia, and proposed the formation of a national reconciliation council. Thailand, in the same period, changed its line of conduct to accelerate the Vietnamese withdrawal from Cambodia: Thai Prime Minister Chatichai Choonhavan initiated a rapprochement with Vietnam and the People's Republic of Kampuchea to favour commercial relations with these two countries.

The United States government threatened Thailand with sanctions for breaking with the Sino-American position. Although negotiations continue. The United States, in turn, wanted the establishment of an independent, but also anti-Vietnamese, Cambodian government, which would be formed by the forces of Son Sann and Sihanouk, possibly with the support of the Khmer Rouge. Vietnam wants the four Cambodian forces – the Sihanouk camp, the Khmer Rouge, the KPNLF, and the People's Republic of Kampuchea – to agree among themselves on a program. China had a negative view of the Vietnamese project, as it would imply international recognition of the People's Republic of Kampuchea. Pol Pot, in turn, intended to take advantage of the peace process to extend his control throughout the country, sabotaging the planned elections.

To facilitate peace negotiations, Vietnam began removing its troops from Cambodia and Laos: on May 26, 1988. In August of the same year, China approved Sihanouk's plan that proposed installing an international force in Cambodia, after the ceasefire, to prevent the Khmer Rouge from returning to power by force; Beijing agreed to no longer support Cambodian resistance in exchange for a precise withdrawal timetable. Vietnam subsequently agreed to withdraw in September 1989: on April 5, 1989, the unilateral and unconditional withdrawal of the Vietnamese army was confirmed. The People's Republic of Kampuchea, whose legitimacy as an interlocutor was recognized by all parties involved, proceeded at the end of April for a constitutional revision to woo the Sihanoukists: the regime abandoned any reference to Marxism–Leninism and took the official name of " State of Cambodia". The ruling party, the Kampuchea People's Revolutionary Party also renamed itself to the Cambodian People's Party (PPC).

In September 1989, the Vietnamese People's Army withdrew completely from Cambodia, with the conflict now being reduced to a minor armed conflict between Cambodian factions. The State of Cambodia and the Coalition Government of Democratic Kampuchea agree to hold a medium-term electoral consultation, which would pave the way for national reconciliation. However, profound differences persisted over the composition of the country's government between the ceasefire and the elections. The Khmer Rouge was the main obstacle, as the Phnom Penh government categorically refused its participation in the coalition government. In November 1989, Australian Foreign Minister Gareth Evans proposed placing Cambodia under UN trusteeship until elections, which eliminated the threat of monopolization of power by the Khmer Rouge.

In June 1990, Hun Sen suggested that the future coalition government, which would be called the Cambodian Supreme National Council (CNS), would have equal representatives from the State of Cambodia and the GCKD. In July 1990, the United States finally stopped supporting the Khmer Rouge. Sihanouk, eager to weaken the Khmer Rouge, approached the State of Cambodia and proposed in May 1991 that leadership of the CNS be shared between a president (himself) and a vice president (Hun Sen). The Khmer Rouge, which received approval from China in April to participate in the negotiations, initially opposed this agreement, but this only increased its diplomatic isolation.

Meeting from June 24 to 26, 1991 in Pattaya, Thailand, the four Cambodian parties finally signed an unconditional ceasefire agreement. On October 23, the Paris Accords on Cambodia were signed: the Sihanoukist National Army and the Khmer People's National Liberation Front consequently ceased armed struggle. The agreements place Cambodia under the tutelage of the United Nations, through the United Nations Transitional Authority in Cambodia (UNTAC) which, with 17,000 soldiers and 8,000 civilians, has the mission of disarming the belligerents, supervising the two opposing administrations, preparing the country for elections and guarantee the return of around 350,000 refugees to the country. On July 17, Norodom Sihanouk assumed the presidency of the Supreme National Council, which must represent Cambodia on the international stage. Inside the country, the State of Cambodia and the guerrilla factions continued to, under the aegis of the United Nations, administer their respective territories: nine-tenths of the country, therefore, remained under the control of the Hun Sen government. The Khmer Rouge agreed to the agreement under joint pressure from China, which wanted to improve its international image and put an end to its conflict with the USSR. Thailand too, was in a hurry to normalize its relations with other states in the region.

The peace resulting from the agreements was fragile. In November 1991, Khieu Samphan and Son Sen arrived in Phnom Penh but were intimidated by an angry crowd led by Hun Sen. The Khmer Rouge delegation then left the Cambodian capital. Son Sen was subsequently expelled from the Khmer Rouge Central Committee, with a ban on contact with UNTAC members. The Khmer Rouge continued to receive diplomatic support from China, as well as discreet military aid. This was in part due to China no longer needing to spare its relations with the disappeared USSR and instead to continue to limit Vietnam's influence in the region.

Having not given up on regaining power, the Khmer Rouge didn't allow the United Nations peacekeeping forces to enter the areas they control; in addition, it continued to harass the armed forces. In 1992, they announced that they would not respect the Paris Agreement and decided to boycott the 1993 elections, preventing its enemies in the State of Cambodia the legitimacy of universal suffrage. Khmer Rouge Radio issued calls for assassinations against Vietnamese migrant workers, and in April 1993, on the eve of elections, around 100 Vietnamese residents of Cambodia were killed. Against all expectations, the legislative elections were held from 24 to 28 May 1993 calmly and enjoyed massive participation, despite intimidation maneuvers by the Khmer Rouge.

FUNCINPEC obtained 45% of the votes and Hun Sen's PPC 36%. Son Sann's Buddhist Liberal Democratic Party (PDLB) gained ten elected officials. Sihanouk, seeing the popular backlash of the Khmer Rouge, gave up on the idea of a government of national unity that would include the Khmer Rouge. On June 14, the constituent assembly resulting from the elections give him full powers to form a government. Sihanouk, who in poor health, did not wish to assume leadership but intended to make himself appear judged. On the 24th, Norodom Ranariddh and Hun Sen agreed to Sihanouk's proposals to form a FUNCINPEC-PPC national unity government, where power was distributed equally. Ranariddh became the first Prime Minister and Hun Sen, the second Prime Minister. On September 21, the assembly opted to return to parliamentary monarchy. Thirty-eight years after renouncing the title of king and twenty-three years after being removed from power, Norodom Sihanouk becomes Cambodia's monarch again.

== Second conflict ==
Excluding itself from the peace process, the Khmer Rouge maintained control of areas in northwestern Cambodia, in the provinces of Battambang and Siem Reap, neighboring Thailand. By 1993, its forces numbered around 10,000 fighters and were able to extend its control to more than half a million Cambodians, four times as many as before the peace accords. Having lost the support of China, which distanced itself from them after realizing its electoral failure, as well as Thailand and Western countries, the Khmer Rouge had to count on other financial resources. This included sale of mining rights for precious stones (rubies and sapphires) and forestry products. Its commercial activities generated around 200 million dollars per year. However, its troops were weakened in the summer of 1993, when a thousand soldiers, following the elections, joined government troops. Sihanouk himself had not abandoned the idea of a peace agreement with the Khmer Rouge. The king, however, had only a symbolic role in the new constitution and Sihanouk was forced to frequently travel to China for medical treatment, which limited his control of the situation.

The Phnom Penh government, on the contrary, was determined to put an end to the Khmer Rouge. At the return of the dry season in the winter of 1993–1994, the Royal Cambodian Armed Forces launched offensives against the reduced Khmer Rouge, but the troops of Son Sen and Pol Pot resisted longer than expected. On 6 July 1994, the Cambodian assembly declared the Khmer Rouge "outlawed" and the two prime ministers asked the UN to establish a special court to try the leaders of Democratic Kampuchea.

In November 1994, three tourists (one French, one British and one Australian) were captured in the Kampot region. The Khmer Rouge demanded a ransom, but also the abolition of the assembly vote that outlawed them. The three hostages would be executed.

From 1994 onwards, tensions between FUNCINPEC and the PPC increased. The two parties competed for power, while Hun Sen increasingly relied on authoritarian measures against his opponents such as Sam Rainsy and opposition newspapers. In secret, FUNCINPEC was negotiating a meeting with a Khmer Rouge faction based in Pailin and led by Ieng Sary, Pol Pot's brother-in-law. The Royalist party hoped that the Khmer Rouge could be used to build support against the PPC. Ieng Sary, who has lost influence over the years within the Khmer Rouge, was concerned about internal tensions within the movement. He would respond to General Nhiek Bun Chhay's offers and on August 8, 1996, announced his break with Pol Pot and their mobilisation into government forces. 3,000 men from his faction defected with him and were integrated by Hun Sen into the official army despite Sihanouk's opposition. In exchange for this meeting, the Prime Minister obtained a "royal pardon" for Ieng Sary which was not equivalent to a grace. The former Khmer Rouge chief, whose family reconverts to business with Thailand, settled into a comfortable residence in Phnom Penh.

FUNCINPEC engaged in secret negotiations with several opposition parties and several of its cadres contact the Khmer Rouge to forge a military alliance with them against Hun Sen. On June 1, Norodom Ranariddh meet with Khieu Samphân on the border between Cambodia and Thailand. A few days later, he publicly announced his agreement with the Khmer Rouge, specifying that he was planning the exile of Pol Pot, Son Sen, and Ta Mok, considered the most radical leaders of the movement. FUNCINPEC's plan was in reality, to capture Pol Pot. On June 7, Radio Khmer Rouge categorically denied any agreement. Two days later, Norodom Sihanouk informed in turn, that he formally excludes the granting of his pardon to Pol Pot and Ta Mok, but not to Son Sen. Pol Pot believed that he has been betrayed and ordered the execution of Son Sen, who was killed together with his wife, former minister Yun Yat, and thirteen members of his entourage and family. Ta Mok fearing for his life decides to avoid suffering the same fate as Son Sen and lead his men to attack Pol Pot's troops, who quickly thereafter, captured. Negotiations between FUNCINPEC and what remained of the Khmer Rouge movement continued.

== 1997 coup d'état and the final offensives ==
On July 5, the day before the signing of an agreement between Ranariddh and Khieu Samphân, Hun Sen took steps to avoid falling victim to an alliance between his enemies. Troops loyal to Hun Sen attack the allies of the Norodom Ranariddh. The confrontation favoured Hun Sen and the king's son was forced into exile, while the clashes left more than a hundred dead, and several members of FUNCINPEC murdered. While the PPC removed FUNCINPEC from power, the Khmer Rouge settled their scores. On July 25, Pol Pot was publicly tried and sentenced to "life imprisonment" – in effect, house arrest by his former subordinates.

In 1998, offensives by government troops completed the disarticulation of the Khmer Rouge. The Anlong Veng district, Khmer Rouge headquarters since 1994 was conquered on March 29, thanks to the defection of one of Ta Mok's commanders. Ke Pauk also surrendered, while Ta Mok fled with his last followers. On April 15, as the Cambodian army approached the Khmer Rouge's last stronghold, Pol Pot was prepared by his jailers to be taken to Thailand. However, he succumbed to a heart attack before being evacuated, possibly helped to die by his Thai military doctor. What remained of the Khmer Rouge took up refuge a few kilometers from the border with Thailand. Ta Mok and 250 to 300 soldiers engaged in banditry to survive. On 25 December, Khieu Samphan and Nuon Chea were handed over to Cambodian authorities by the Thai army. They are welcomed as high dignitaries, with Hun Sen pledging not to bring them before national or international courts, in the name of "national reconciliation". On the other hand, the Cambodian Prime Minister refused any pardon for Ta Mok. Khieu Samphân and Nuon Chea apologized for their role in the Cambodian genocide and declared "The Khmer Rouge are over!" Last Khmer Rouge guerrillas surrendered to the Cambodian government on 9 February 1999, ending the remnants of communism in Cambodia. As a result, the government incorporated the last remnants of the Khmer Rouge into Cambodian army on February 12. Ta Mok, the last Khmer Rouge leader still at large, was captured by the Thai army and handed over to Cambodian authorities on March 6, 1999.

== See also ==
- Third Indochina War
- Cambodian humanitarian crisis
- K5 Plan
