= Democratic National Union Movement =

- Abbreviation: DNUM
- Leader: Ieng Sary
- Founded: August 1996
- Dissolved: November 2007
- Split from: CNUP
- Newspaper: Phka Rik
- Ideology: Limited democracy

The Democratic National Union Movement (DNUM) (Khmer: ចលនាសហភាពជាតិប្រជាធិបតេយ្យ) was a Cambodian political party founded after senior Khmer Rouge official Ieng Sary's defection from the Cambodian National Unity Party in August 1996. A magazine entitled Phka Rik (Flower in Bloom) is associated with it. It was created primarily to facilitate Ieng Sary's reentry into civilian political life, claiming neutrality and that he had broken away from the Khmer Rouge and from the "fascism and cruelty of Pol Pot's regime," naming Nuon Chea, Ta Mok, Son Sen and Yun Yat as Pol Pot's cohorts and "mass murderers of Cambodia." He stated that he was a supporter of "limited democracy"; he named Thailand, Singapore, and Japan as examples.

Despite building up ties with the Cambodian People's Party (CPP), founded by Hun Sen, the DNUM declined to participate in the 1998 elections. The Movement's support for the CPP-dominated government at the time allowed it considerable autonomy over Pailin, an ex-Khmer Rouge stronghold notable for gem and timber exports.

== See also ==
- Provisional Government of National Union and National Salvation of Cambodia
- Khmer National Solidarity Party
