= Khmer Rouge unrecognized government =

Former, unrecognized rump state of the Khmer Rouge

Provisional Government of National Union and National Salvation of Cambodia រដ្ឋាភិបាលបណ្តោះអាសន្ននៃសហភាពជាតិនិងសង្គ្រោះជាតិកម្ពុជា Khmer Rouge
- 1994–1998
- Flag
- Anthem: Dap Prampi Mesa Chokchey
- The parallel government controlled parts of the Pailin Province, which in 1996 became a semi-autonomous of the Kingdom of Cambodia

- The parallel government also controlled areas of Preah Vihear Province and Oddar Meancheay Province
- Status: Parallel government of the Khmer Rouge
- Capital and largest municipality: Pailin
- Common languages: Khmer
- Government: Provisional government
- De facto leader
  - 1994–1997: Pol Pot
  - 1997–1998: Ta Mok
- Prime Minister
  - 1994–1998: Khieu Samphan
- Deputy Prime Minister
  - 1994–1997: Son Sen
- History
  - Established: 11 July 1994
  - Dissolved: 22 June 1998
- Currency: Riel
Preceded by	Succeeded by
1993: Democratic Kampuchea; 1994: Kingdom of Cambodia	1998: Kingdom of Cambodia
- Today part of: Cambodia

The Provisional Government of National Union and National Salvation of Cambodia (PGNUNSC) was an internationally unrecognised and ostensibly provisional government set up by the Khmer Rouge on July 11, 1994, in opposition to the established Kingdom of Cambodia.

== History ==
PGNUNSC's Prime Minister was Khieu Samphan (who was also head of the armed forces) and its Deputy Prime Minister (in charge also of foreign affairs) was Son Sen. It was staffed by members of the Cambodian National Unity Party. Areas it controlled included Pailin (the capital of the provisional government) and Preah Vihear (where it was based.) The Khmer Rouge radio station was also known as the "Radio of the Provisional Government of National Union and National Salvation of Cambodia." Other ministers included Chan Youran, Mak Ben, In Sopheap, Kor Bun Heng, Pich Cheang and Chuon Choeun.

In August 1996 senior Khmer Rouge official Ieng Sary defected from the Khmer Rouge regime with two armed divisions and the formation of his own party, the Democratic National Union Movement, which in turn encouraged more defections from the regime as Pol Pot ordered the assassinations of Son Sen (successful) and Ta Mok (failed) In mid-June 1997 Khieu Samphan (who had by now founded the Khmer National Solidarity Party) denounced Pol Pot and began discussing demobilization and a return to civilian life.

With Pol Pot's death in April 1998 and widespread sentiment within the Khmer Rouge for an end to an almost 20-year conflict. After Pol Pot's death Khmer Rouge members defected and are offering land in areas under their control to returnees and displaced persons - so-called reconciliation zones - in exchange for development aid and funding to clear mines. Khieu Samphan and Ta Mok dissolved the provisional government on June 22, 1998, basically ending the Khmer Rouge regime.

== See also ==
Liberated Area of Cambodia
