= Cambodian National Unity Party =

Cambodian National Unity Party គណបក្សសាមគ្គីជាតិកម្ពុជា
- Abbreviation: CNUP
- Leader: Khieu Samphan; Son Sen
- Founded: 30 November 1992
- Dissolved: 1997
- Preceded by: Party of Democratic Kampuchea
- Succeeded by: Khmer National Solidarity Party
- Military wing: National Army of Democratic Kampuchea
- Ideology: Liberal democracy
- Political position: Centre-left to left-wing

The Cambodian National Unity Party (Khmer: គណបក្សសាមគ្គីជាតិកម្ពុជា) was a political party set up by the Khmer Rouge on 30 November 1992, during the United Nations Transitional Authority in Cambodia, to participate in the elections that year. The party was led by Khieu Samphan and Son Sen. It succeeded the Party of Democratic Kampuchea after 1993. As with the Party of Democratic Kampuchea, the National Army of Democratic Kampuchea was said to be its armed wing. Its professed aim at its founding was to "work towards implementing multi-party liberal democracy." Its radio station was known as the Voice of the Great National Union Front of Cambodia until being replaced in July 1994 by PGNUNSC Radio.

Despite its stated wish to contest the 1993 elections, the Khmer Rouge soon ran into various disputes with United Nations authorities in Cambodia, culminating in their desire to boycott the elections. Subsequently, UNTAC decided not to conduct elections in areas under CNUP control. At the time, it was estimated that approximately six per cent of the population in Cambodia lived in areas under Khmer Rouge control. In July 1994, the Party of Democratic Kampuchea was declared illegal by the government, and the self-proclaimed "Provisional Government of National Union and National Salvation of Cambodia" was subsequently set up with involvement by CNUP members.

In August 1996, the party suffered a split when Ieng Sary and his followers in North-Western Cambodia broke away and founded the Democratic National Union Movement. In May 1997, Khieu Samphan founded the Khmer National Solidarity Party after defecting from the Khmer Rouge.
