= Liberated Area of Cambodia =

Territory controlled by the Kampuchean United Front for National Salvation

- 1978–1979
- Flag of the FUNSK
- Status: Areas controlled by the FUNSK and a government-in-waiting
- Capital: Snuol district
- President
  - 1978–1979: Heng Samrin
- Deputy President
  - 1978–1979: Chea Sim
- Establishment: Pre-Cambodian-Vietnamese War
- History
  - First reports of existence: 2 December 1978
  - Establishment of the Kampuchean People's Revolutionary Council Government: 8 January 1979
Preceded by	Succeeded by
Democratic Kampuchea	Kampuchean People's Revolutionary Council Government
- Today part of: Kingdom of Cambodia

The Liberated Area of Cambodia, Snuol Liberation Area, Liberated Area of Snun, Liberated Areas or Liberated Zone refers to the territory of the Kampuchean United Front for National Salvation, then also called United Front for National Salvation.

== Background ==
After the Eastern Zone massacres, members of the Pro-Vietnam faction of the Communist Party of Kampuchea, defected from the Communist Party of Kampuchea.

== Foundation ==
On 2 December 1978, the defectors of the CPK founded the Kampuchean United Front for National Salvation, in Snuol in the Liberated Area, this was the first time the Liberated Area was mentioned.

== Governance ==
Heng Samrin served as President of government-in-waiting, while Chea Sim became Deputy President of government-in-waiting.

The Thai intelligence reported, “After driving out the Khmer Rouge from an area, the Front immediately dismantles the communal kitchen and brings in a few monks to reassure the people.” Western sources reported the same thing.

On January 1, 1979, the central committee of the front proclaimed a set of "immediate policies" to be applied in the "liberated areas." One of these policies was to establish "people's self-management committees" in all localities.

=== Foreign relationships ===
The FUNSK had relations with the Socialist Republic of Vietnam and the Soviet Union.

== Dissolution ==
On 7 January 1979, the People's Army of Vietnam of the Socialist Republic of Vietnam took over Phnom Penh, the next day the Kampuchean People's Revolutionary Council Government was established to replace the Liberated Area, which was the government-in-waiting for the People'sRepublic of Kampuchea.

== See also ==
- Provisional Government of National Union and National Salvation of Cambodia
