= Somlenh Polokor =

Somlenh Polokor (Khmer: សំឡេងពលករ, lit. 'Workers' Voice') was a Cambodian journal, published during the 1960s. It was closely connected to the clandestine Communist Party of Kampuchea.
