= Ta Mok =

Cambodian military officer (1924–2006)

- តាម៉ុក
- Ta Mok in 1999

Leader of the Provisional Government of National Union and National Salvation of Cambodia
- De facto 1997 – 22 June 1998
- Preceded by: Pol Pot
- Succeeded by: None

Commander of the Khmer Rouge
- In office 1997 – 9 February 1999 Serving with Khieu Samphan (1997–1998)
- Preceded by: Khieu Samphan
- Succeeded by: Office abolished

Personal details
- Born: Chhit Choeun; 1925 Takéo, Cambodia, French Indochina
- Died: 21 July 2006 (aged 80–81) Phnom Penh, Cambodia
- Party: Communist Party of Kampuchea; Party of Democratic Kampuchea

Ta Mok (Khmer: តាម៉ុក; born Chhit Choeun, ឈិត ជឿន; 1925 – 21 July 2006), also known as Nguon Kang, was a Cambodian military chief who was a senior figure in the Khmer Rouge and the leader of the National Army of Democratic Kampuchea. He was also known as Brother Number Five or the Butcher. He was captured along the Cambodia–Thailand border in March 1999 by Cambodian government forces while on the run with a small band of followers; he was held in government custody until his death in 2006 while awaiting his war crimes trial.

== Early life ==
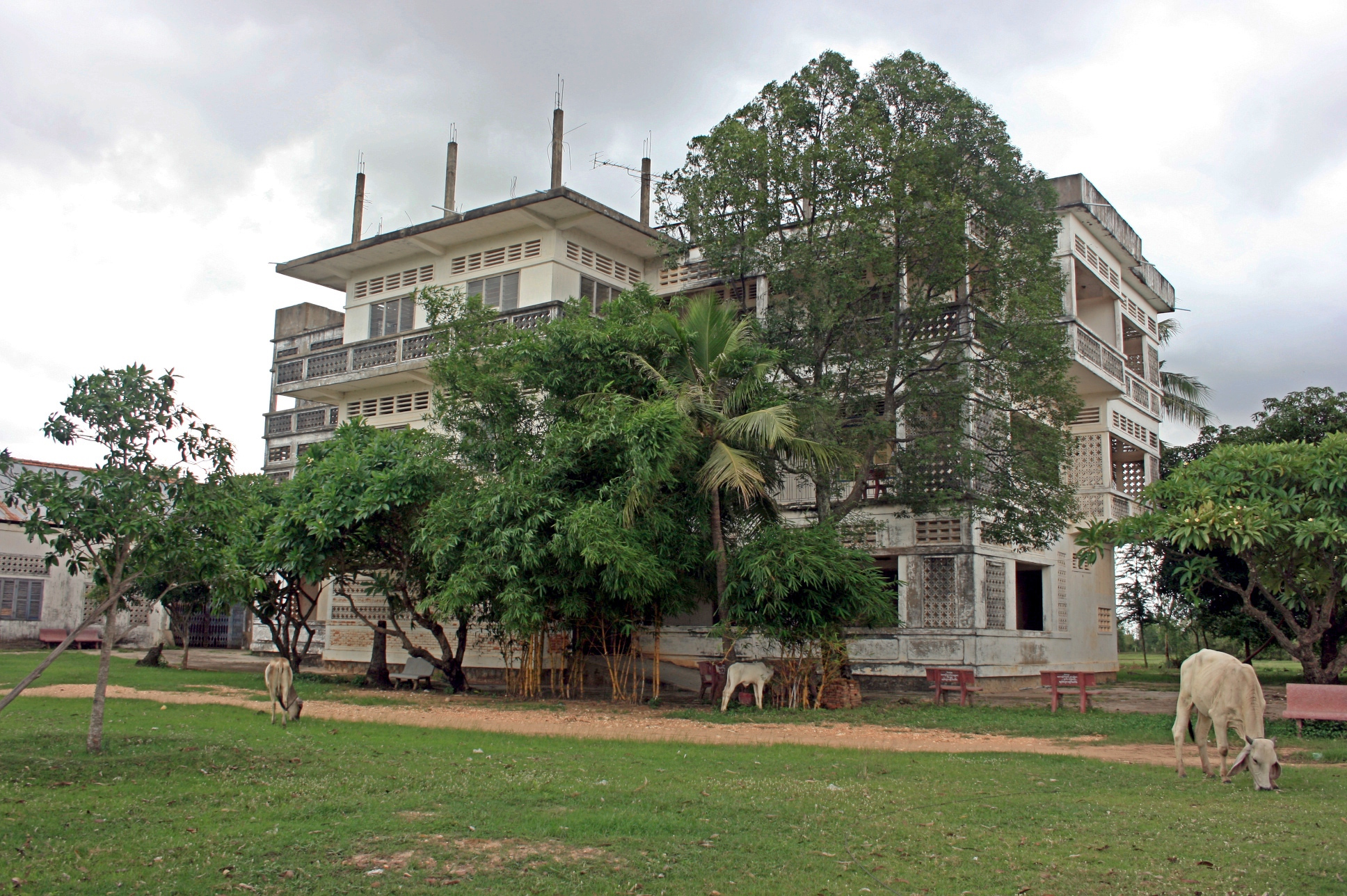
Ta Mok's mansion in Takéo

The eldest of seven children, he is believed to have been born into a prosperous country family from Pra Keap village, Trapeang Thom commune, Tram Kak district, Takeo Province, and was of Chinese-Cambodian descent. He became a Buddhist monk in the 1930s but left the order at the age of 16.

Ta Mok took part in the resistance against French colonial rule and then the anti-Japanese resistance during the 1940s. He was training to become a Bhikkhu in Pali, Cambodia when he joined the anti-French Khmer Issarak in 1952. He soon left Phnom Penh and joined the Khmer Rouge/Communist Party of Kampuchea (CPK).

== In Khmer Rouge ==
By the late 1960s, Ta Mok was a general and the Khmer Rouge's chief-of-staff. He was also a member of the Standing Committee of the Khmer Rouge's Central Committee ("Party Centre") during its period in power. He became very powerful within the party, especially in the south-west zone. He was named by Pol Pot as leader of the national army of Democratic Kampuchea. He lost the lower part of one leg in fighting around 1970 during the Cambodian Civil War.

Ta Mok orchestrated several massacres within the territories that he captured from 1973, beginning before the final, complete seizure of power by the Khmer Rouge on 17 April 1975. For example, his and Ke Pauk's soldiers had 20,000 civilians murdered or forced into slave labour after capturing Oudong in March 1974.

He was also responsible for directing the massive purges that characterised the short-lived Democratic Kampuchea (1975–1979), including the mass killing of 30,000 people in the Angkor Chey district, earning him the nickname Butcher.

== After the fall of the Khmer Rouge ==
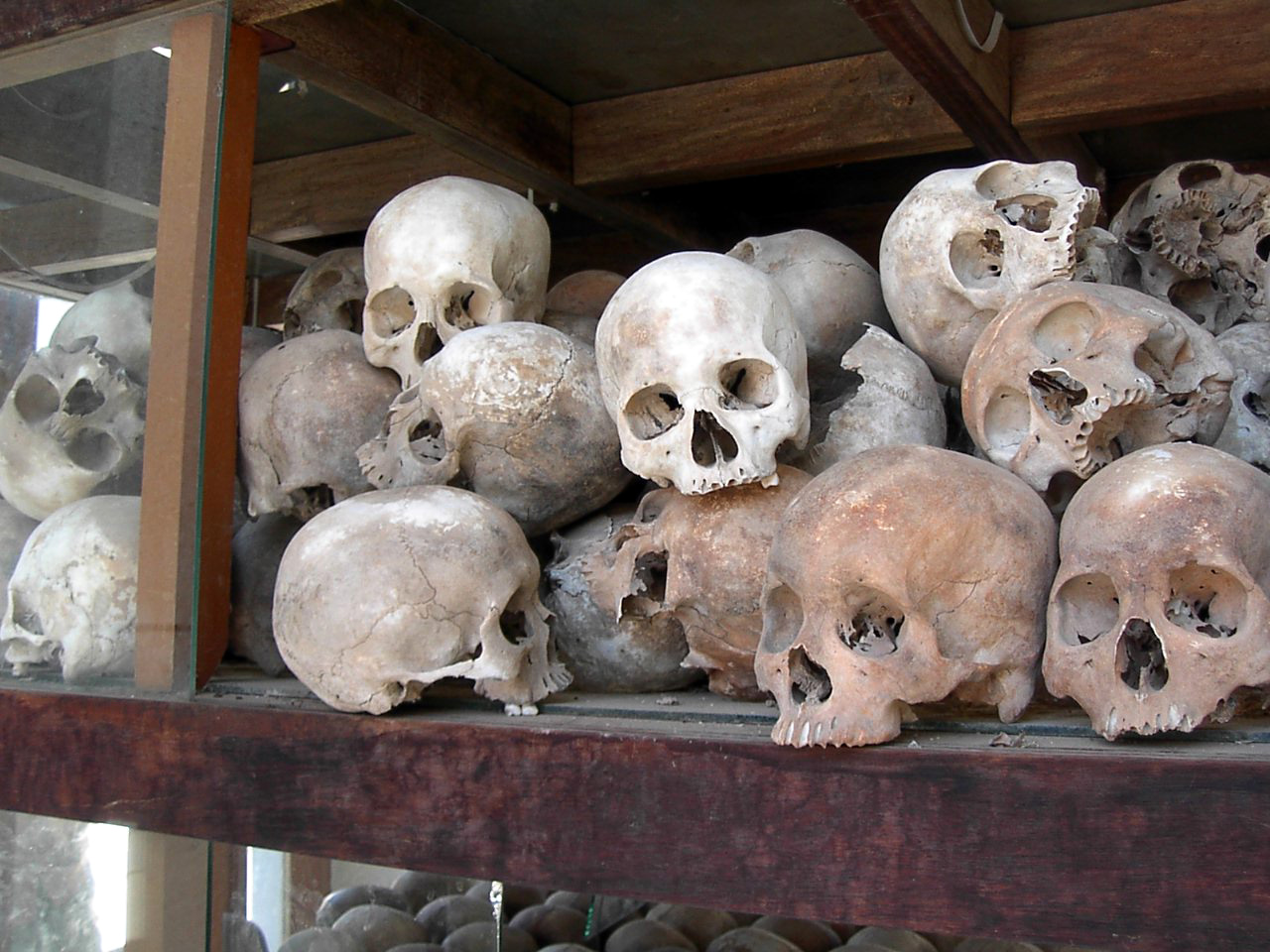
Skulls of Khmer Rouge victims

After the regime was overthrown by the Vietnamese in 1979, Ta Mok remained a powerful figure, controlling the northern area of the Khmer Rouge's remaining territory from his base at Anlong Veng in the Dângrêk Mountains. It is estimated that some 3,000 to 5,000 combatants remained loyal to Pol Pot and were directed by Ta Mok.

In 1997, after a split in the party, Ta Mok seized control of one faction and named himself supreme commander. Pol Pot then fled the Khmer Rouge's northern stronghold, but was later arrested and sentenced to lifelong house arrest. In April 1998, after a new government attack, Ta Mok fled into the forest and took Pol Pot with him. A few days later, on 15 April 1998, Pol Pot died in custody.

On 25 July 1997, Ta Mok and Pol Pot were interviewed separately by Nate Thayer. Unrepentant, Mok chuckled as he debated whether the Khmer Rouge had killed millions of people or just "hundreds of thousands," claiming that he had only killed Vietnamese.

In 1998, after several key defections, Ta Mok was forced to flee to Anlong Veng. On 6 March 1999, the general was captured by the Cambodian army near the Thai border and brought to capital Phnom Penh, where he joined former comrade Khang Khek Ieu ("Comrade Duch") at the Military Prosecution Department Detention Facility. Ta Mok was the last leading member of the Khmer Rouge to remain at large in Cambodia; other senior figures had died or already made immunity deals with the government of Hun Sen, including Nuon Chea, Khieu Samphan and Ieng Sary.

In prison, his detention period was repeatedly extended without his being brought to trial. Under Cambodian law his trial should have begun within six months of his arrest. First charged with membership of an outlawed group and tax evasion, in February 2002 he was charged with crimes against humanity. In poor health with respiratory problems, Ta Mok's only releases from solitary confinement were for hospital visits. On 21 July 2006, due to heart complications caused by the stress of the upcoming trial, he died in a military hospital after falling into a coma.

Ta Mok's house in Anlong Ven is a tourist site. A 2023 study found that villages that were governed by Ta Mok during the Khmer Rouge regime have persistently worse economic development outcomes than villages that were governed by more moderate elements of the Khmer Rouge.
