= Patriotic and Democratic Front of the Great National Union of Kampuchea =

Successor group to the Communist Party of Kampuchea

The Patriotic and Democratic Front of the Great National Union of Kampuchea (Khmer: រណសិរ្សប្រជាធិបតេយ្យស្នេហាជាតិនៃមហាសាមគ្គីជាតិកម្ពុជា) (PDFGNUK) was a Kampuchean mass organization set up by the Communist Party of Kampuchea (popularly known as the Khmer Rouge) on August 21, 1979 after the fall of Democratic Kampuchea to Vietnamese troops and the subsequent proclamation of the People's Republic of Kampuchea. It was set up as a counterpart to the Kampuchean United Front for National Salvation that had been nurtured by the Vietnamese. Its purpose was to rally anti-Vietnamese nationalists to support the Khmer Rouge, as part of an effort to legitimize the discredited Democratic Kampuchea regime. It was announced by Khieu Samphan, who was elected its provisional chairman. The PDFGNUK can be seen as an attempt to revive the goals of the similar GRUNK coalition of the early 1970s, an organization that united the Khmer Rouge and pro-Sihanouk forces opposing the Khmer Republic.

== Activities ==
In theory, the Union served as an interim organization fulfilling the conditions of a government in exile at the Kampuchean-Thai border until the formation of the Coalition Government of Democratic Kampuchea in 1982. Within a year the Front had published a draft of its political program. With Chinese backing it disowned some of the "errors" of the 1975-1979 period and announced that the ability to freely marry and to practice religion was to be respected, while also calling for a "liberal democratic system" replacing the 1976 constitution as it "renounced the building of socialism and communism for tens or hundreds of years in order to mobilize a broad national front to crush the Vietnamese enemy, the Lê Duẩn clique." The Front promoted calls for free, contested elections with UN oversight after the expulsion of Vietnamese troops and encouraged the development of private property along with the participation of hitherto persecuted Buddhist monks in the governing affairs of the country. These activities however were widely seen as having ulterior and dishonest motives, with Prince Sihanouk denouncing the Front and its program as a "ploy," and "only a few responded to the Khmer Rouge's appeal for unity under the PDFGNUK," though despite this the Front formally continued to exist as of 1987 under the Party of Democratic Kampuchea.
