= Tung Padevat =

Newspaper of the Khmer Rouge

Cover of the December–January, 1975 Special Edition of Tung Padevat, Issue 76. The covers of the publication were fairly similar throughout the period of publication. The cover carries five red flags. Below the five banners, Tung Padevat is written in large, shaded letters, in large shaded round Mul script. At the bottom of the cover are the issue numbers, the month, and the year of the publication.

Tung Padevat (Khmer: ទង់បដិវត្ត, Tóng Bâdĕvôtt [tɔŋ paɗeʋɔət]; lit. 'Revolutionary Flag') was a Khmer-language journal in Cambodia. Tung Padevat was one of the theoretical organs of the Communist Party of Kampuchea (CPK), generally known as the Khmer Rouge. The first issue was published in January 1975. It was published monthly at least until September 1978. There were also several 'special issues' published.

== Format ==
Throughout its period of publishing, the magazine had a uniform format. Most issues ranged between 65 and 85 pages. The September and October/November issues of 1977 contained 133 pages. The April 1977 issue, on the other hand, had only 29 pages.

== Content ==
Articles published in Tung Padevat include history of the CPK, excerpts from speeches made by Party leaders, and Party goals, highlighting rice production as a primary goal.
