= Yun Yat =

Cambodian politician (1934–1997)

- យុន យ៉ាត

Minister of Information
- In office 6 July 1977 – 7 January 1979
- Prime Minister: Pol Pot
- Preceded by: Hu Nim

Personal details
- Born: 1934 Phnom Penh, Cambodia, French Indochina
- Died: 10 June 1997 (aged 62–63) Anlong Veng, Oddar Meanchey Province, Cambodia
- Cause of death: Execution by shooting
- Party: Communist Party of Kampuchea
- Spouse: Son Sen

Yun Yat (Khmer: យុន យ៉ាត; 1934 – 10 June 1997), also known by her alias Comrade At (Khmer: សមមិត្តនារីអាត), was the wife of Son Sen, Defence Minister of Democratic Kampuchea. On 9 October 1975, the Standing Committee of Communist Party of Kampuchea placed her in charge of information and education inside and outside of the country. In 1977, she was appointed as Information Minister after Hu Nim's arrest and execution.

On 10 June 1997 Khieu Samphan (former Chair of the State Presidium) declared that Yun Yat and Son Sen had been arrested as spies of Hun Sen and Vietnam, and declared as traitors. Yun Yat, Son Sen and eight of their relatives were executed on 10 June 1997 by the Khmer Rouge rump state on the orders of Pol Pot.
