= Khmer National Solidarity Party =

Former Cambodian political party

Khmer National Solidarity Party គណៈបក្សសាមគ្គីជាតិខ្មែរ
- Abbreviation: KNSP
- Leader: Khieu Samphan
- Founded: April (or May) 1997
- Dissolved: December 1998
- Preceded by: Cambodian National Unity Party
- Ideology: Democratic socialism Liberal democracy
- Political position: Centre-left to left-wing

The Khmer National Solidarity Party (KNSP) was a Cambodian political party founded in May 1997 by senior Khmer Rouge leader Khieu Samphan after he denunciated Pol Pot and as he began distancing himself from the Khmer Rouge. Khieu Samphan was formerly the leader of the Cambodian National Unity Party. Khieu Samphan had announced the new party to back the National United Front proposed by Prince Norodom Ranariddh for the 1998 Cambodian parliamentary election. Still, opposition from the ruling Cambodian People's Party led by Hun Sen prevented this from occurring. Khieu Samphan stated in 1998 of the elections that, "If the elections do not go ahead under the iron rule of Vietnamese communists and their puppet, we should be very happy and want to take part because we are democratic, pluralistic and free government."

== See also ==
- Democratic National Union Movement
