= National Army of Democratic Kampuchea =

Cambodian guerrilla force

- Leader: Son Sen
- Founded: December 1979
- Dissolved: Late 1990s
- Allegiance: Party of Democratic Kampuchea
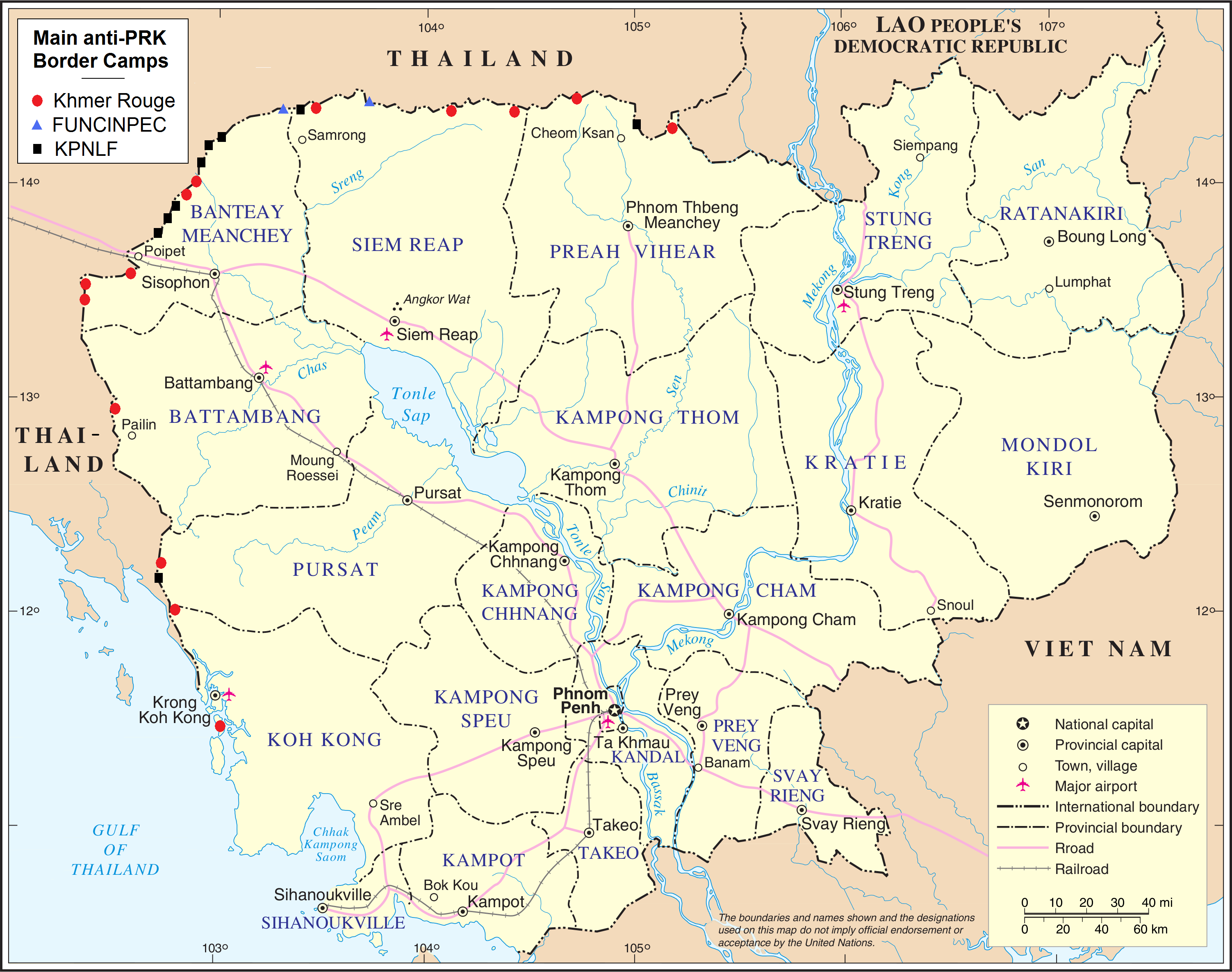
- Active regions: Border camps hostile to the PRK; 1979–1984. NADK camps shown in red
- Size: 40,000–50,000 (1980s)

The National Army of Democratic Kampuchea (NADK) was a Cambodian guerrilla force. NADK were the armed forces of the Party of Democratic Kampuchea also known as "Khmer Rouge", operating between 1979 and the late 1990s.

== History ==
NADK was formed in December 1979 in order to replace the Revolutionary Army of Kampuchea. NADK forces consisted mainly of former RAK troops – large numbers of whom had escaped the 1978 to 1979 Vietnamese invasion of Cambodia. It also included conscripts coerced into submission during the RAK retreat and new volunteers or recruits either pressed into service during in-country raids or drawn from among refugee groups. The New York Times reported in June 1987 that "the Khmer Rouge army is believed to be having some success in its recruitment, not only among the refugees in its camps but within the Vietnamese controlled People's Republic of Kampuchea." The NADK did not make personnel figures public, but estimates by military observers and by journalists generally ranged between 40,000 and 50,000 combatants in the 1980s.

In 1987 the opinion that the NADK was "the only effective fighting force" opposing the Vietnamese was more often expressed by Western observers. In an interview published in the United States in May 1987, prince Norodom Sihanouk reportedly said, "without the Khmer Rouge, we have no credibility on the battlefield... [they are]... the only credible military force."

During the 1980s, the Khmer Rouge leadership, composed of party cadres who doubled as military commanders, remained fairly constant. Pol Pot retained an ambiguous but presumably prominent position in the hierarchy, although he was nominally replaced as commander in chief of the NADK by Son Sen, who, like Pol Pot, had also been a student in Paris and who had gone underground with him in 1963. There were reports of factions in the NADK, such as one loyal to Khieu Samphan, prime minister of the defunct regime of Democratic Kampuchea, and his deputy Ieng Sary, and another identified with Pol Pot and Ta Mok (the Southwestern Zone commander who conducted extensive purges of party ranks in Cambodia in 1977 to 1978). Although led by party and military veterans, the NADK combatants in 1987 were reportedly "less experienced, less motivated, and younger" than those the Vietnamese had faced in previous encounters. Nevertheless, the new Khmer Rouge recruits still were "hardy and lower class," and tougher than the non-communist combatants.

During forays into Cambodia, NADK units employed terror tactics against Khmer civilians, including murder and destruction of economic resources. Such success as they achieved in recruiting was apparently owed to traditional Cambodian hatred of the Vietnamese invader, although there were reports that some of the peasantry would have preferred to endure a continued Vietnamese occupation rather than to suffer a return to Khmer Rouge rule.

During this time the Khmer Rouge divided the country into four military zones that functioned virtually autonomously under their respective commanders. Within these four zones, three areas—the provinces around the Tonle Sap, the western border of Cambodia, and the remainder of the country—were sites of NADK tactical operations. It was the first area, the heartland of Cambodia, that the NADK viewed as the "Achilles' heel of the Vietnamese enemy," where NADK military efforts were concentrated.

NADK units managed to keep the main routes linking Phnom Penh to western Cambodia "in a permanent state of insecurity," according to a senior Vietnamese military observer; traffic to and from the seaport of Kampong Saom was obliged to move in convoys. Both highways and railroads from the capital were interdicted intermittently because of guerrilla activity. Officials in Phnom Penh told a Western correspondent in 1987 that the Khmer Rouge were then operating in small insurgent groups inside Cambodia in a battle for the villages, rather than fighting from the Thai border area, as had been the case prior to the 1984 to 1985 Vietnamese dry-season offensive. In carrying the war to the countryside, the NADK demonstrated that it had gone on the strategic defensive, that is, that it would adhere to a doctrine of guerrilla warfare until the balance of forces was about equal. If this parity were to be achieved, NADK strategists presumably would then switch to offensive operations.

In carrying on its protracted insurgency, the NADK received the bulk of its military equipment and financing from China, which had supported the previous regime of Democratic Kampuchea. One pro-Beijing source put the level of Chinese aid to the NADK at US$1 million a month. Another source, although it did not give a breakdown, set the total level of Chinese assistance, to all the resistance factions, at somewhere between US$60 million and US$100 million a year.

The Chinese weaponry observed in the possession of NADK combatants included Type 56 assault rifles, RPD light machine guns, Type 69 RPG launchers, recoilless rifles, and anti-personnel mines. NADK guerrillas were usually seen garbed in dark green Chinese fatigues and soft "Mao caps" without insignia. No markings or patches were evident on guerrilla uniforms, although the NADK had promulgated a hierarchy of ranks with distinctive insignias in 1981.

To keep troops and supplies moving into the combat zone, the NADK, according to Vietnamese sources, followed two infiltration routes. One of them ran south from Thailand through the Dangrek Escarpment into Cambodia. The second ran north from Trat, a minor Thai seaport that may have been an unloading point for Chinese supplies for the Khmer Rouge. In spite of substantial Chinese material assistance, however, the NADK could not maintain the logistical supply line needed to conduct a sustained military campaign.

The NADK continued fighting Cambodian government forces into the late 1990s.

== See also ==
- Phnom Malai
- Coalition Government of Democratic Kampuchea
