= Communist Party of Kampuchea =

Ruling party of Cambodia from 1975 to 1979

Communist Party of Kampuchea បក្សកុម្មុយនីស្តកម្ពុជា
- Abbreviation: CPK
- General Secretary: Pol Pot
- Spokesperson: Khieu Samphan
- Deputy secretary: Nuon Chea
- Founded: 30 September 1960 (as separate party)
- Dissolved: 6 December 1981
- Split from: Kampuchean People's Revolutionary Party (1951–1960)
- Succeeded by: Party of Democratic Kampuchea
- Headquarters: Phnom Penh
- Newspaper: Tung Padevat
- Youth wing: Communist Youth League of Kampuchea
- Armed wing: Kampuchea Revolutionary Army
- Ideology: Communism; Marxism–Leninism(claimed); Maoism; Agrarian socialism; Khmer ultranationalism; Anti-Vietnamese sentiment
- Political position: Far-left
- Anthem: "The Internationale"

Party flag

The Communist Party of Kampuchea (CPK), (Note: Khmer: បក្សកុម្មុយនិស្តកម្ពុជា, romanized: Păk Communist Kămpŭchia, IPA: [paʔ kom.muj.nih kam.puʔ.ciə]) also known as the Khmer Communist Party, was a Marxist-Leninist and Maoist political party in Kampuchea. Its leader was Pol Pot, and its members were generally known as the Khmer Rouge. Originally founded in 1951, the party was split into pro-Chinese and pro-Soviet factions as a result of the Sino-Soviet split, with the former led by the Pol Pot faction and the latter aligned with the Soviet Union, which the Pol Pot faction denounced as revisionist. While pro-Chinese, Deng Xiaoping criticised the Khmer Rouge for engaging in "deviations from Marxism–Leninism". Albania's Enver Hoxha referred to Pot as a "barbarous fascist". As such, it claimed that 30 September 1960 was its founding date; it was named the Workers' Party of Kampuchea, (Note: Khmer: គណបក្សពលករកម្ពុជា, romanized: Keanapak Poleaka Kampuchea, IPA: [keaʔnaʔpak pɔleaʔkɑː kampuciə]) before it was renamed the Communist Party in 1966.

The party operated underground for most of its existence, and it took control of the country in April 1975, establishing the state known as Democratic Kampuchea. The party retained control until 1979, when the Vietnamese invasion led to the establishment of the People's Republic of Kampuchea. The party was officially dissolved in 1981, after which the Khmer Rouge remnants re-organized under the Party of Democratic Kampuchea, claiming to continue its legacy.

== History ==
=== Foundation of the party and first divisions ===
The party was founded in 1951, when the Indochinese Communist Party (ICP) was divided into separate Cambodian, Laotian and Vietnamese communist parties. The decision to form a separate Cambodian communist party was taken at the Indochinese Communist Party congress in February of the same year. Different sources claim different dates for the party's founding and first congress. Son Ngoc Minh was appointed as the acting chairman of the party. The party congress did not elect a full Central Committee, but instead appointed a Party Propagation and Formation Committee.

At its formation, the Cambodian party was called the Kampuchean People's Revolutionary Party (KPRP). The Vietnamese heavily dominated the Indochinese Communist Party, and the Vietnamese party actively supported the KPRP during its initial phase of existence. Due to the reliance on Vietnamese support in the joint struggle against French colonial rule, the party's history would later be rewritten, stating 1960 as the year of the party's foundation.

According to Democratic Kampuchea's version of party history, the Viet Minh's failure to negotiate a political role for the KPRP at the 1954 Geneva Conference represented a betrayal of the Cambodian movement, which still controlled large areas of the countryside and which commanded at least 5,000 armed men. Following the conference, about 1,000 members of the KPRP, including Son Ngoc Minh, made a Long March into North Vietnam, where they remained in exile. In late 1954, those who stayed in Cambodia founded a legal political party, the Krom Pracheachon, which participated in the National Assembly elections of 1955 and 1958.

In the September 1955 election, it won about 4% of the vote but did not secure a seat in the legislature. Members of the Pracheachon were subject to constant harassment and arrests because the party remained outside Prince Norodom Sihanouk's Sangkum. Government attacks prevented it from participating in the 1962 election and drove it underground. It is speculated that the decision of Pracheachon to file candidates for the election had not been approved by the now renamed "Workers' Party of Kampuchea" (WPK). Sihanouk habitually labeled local leftists the Khmer Rouge, a term that later came to signify the party and the state.

=== Paris students' group ===
During the 1950s, Khmer students in Paris organized a communist movement, which had little connection to the hard-pressed party in their homeland. The men and women who returned home and took command of the party apparatus during the 1960s came from their ranks. They led an effective insurgency against Sihanouk and Lon Nol from 1968 until 1975 and established the regime of Democratic Kampuchea.

Pol Pot, who rose to the leadership of the communist movement in the 1960s, was born in 1928 (some sources say in 1925) in Kampong Thum Province, northeast of Phnom Penh. He attended a technical high school in the capital and then went to Paris in 1949 to study radio electronics (other sources say he attended a school for printers and typesetters and also studied civil engineering). Ieng Sary was a Chinese-Khmer born in 1930 in South Vietnam. He attended the elite Lycée Sisowath in Phnom Penh before beginning courses in commerce and politics at the Paris Institute of Political Studies (more widely known as Sciences Po) in France. Khieu Samphan, considered "one of the most brilliant intellects of his generation", was born in 1931 and specialized in economics and politics during his time in Paris. In talent, he was rivaled by Hou Yuon (born in 1930), who studied economics and law. Son Sen (born in 1930) studied education and literature, while Hu Nim (born in 1932) studied law.

Most members of the Paris student group came from landowners' or civil servants' families. Three of the Paris group forged a bond that survived years of revolutionary struggle and intraparty strife. Pol Pot and Ieng Sary married Khieu Ponnary and Khieu Thirith (also known as Ieng Thirith), purportedly relatives of Khieu Samphan. These two well-educated women also played a central role in the regime of Democratic Kampuchea.

At some time between 1949 and 1951, Pol Pot and Ieng Sary joined the French Communist Party. In 1951, the two men went to East Berlin to participate in a youth festival. This experience is considered a turning point in their ideological development. Meeting with Khmers fighting with the Viet Minh (whom they subsequently judged too subservient to the Vietnamese) convinced them that only a tightly disciplined party organization and a readiness for armed struggle could achieve revolution. They transformed the Khmer Students' Association (KSA), to which most of the 200 Khmer students in Paris belonged, into an organization for nationalist and leftist ideas.

Inside the KSA and its successor organizations was a secret organization known as the Cercle Marxiste. The organization was composed of cells of three to six members, with most members knowing nothing about the overall structure. In 1952, Pol Pot, Hou Yuon, Ieng Sary, and other leftists gained notoriety by sending an open letter to Sihanouk calling him the "strangler of infant democracy". A year later, the French authorities closed down the KSA, but Hou Yuon and Khieu Samphan helped to establish in 1956 a new group, the Khmer Students' Union. Inside, the group was still run by the Cercle Marxiste.

=== Clandestine existence in Phnom Penh ===
After returning to Cambodia in 1953, Pol Pot threw himself into party work. At first, he joined with allied forces with the Viet Minh operating in the rural areas of Kampong Cham Province (Kompong Cham). After the end of the war, he moved to Phnom Penh under Tou Samouth's "urban committee", where he became an important point of contact between the above-ground parties of the left and the underground secret communist movement. His allies, Ieng Sary and Hou Yuon, became teachers at a new private high school, the Lycée Kambuboth, which Hou Yuon helped to establish.

Khieu Samphan returned from Paris in 1959, taught as a University of Phnom Penh law faculty member, and started a left-wing French-language publication, L'Observateur. The paper soon acquired a reputation in Phnom Penh's small academic circle. The following year, the government closed the paper, and Sihanouk's police publicly humiliated Khieu by beating, undressing, and photographing him in public—as Shawcross notes, "not the sort of humiliation that men forgive or forget". Yet the experience did not prevent Khieu from advocating cooperation with Sihanouk to promote a united front against United States activities in South Vietnam. As mentioned, Khieu Samphan, Hou Yuon, and Hu Nim were forced to "work through the system" by joining the Sangkum and accepting posts in the prince's government.

From 28 to 30 September 1960, twenty-one leaders of the KPRP held a secret congress in a vacant room of the Phnom Penh railroad station. Approximately 14 delegates represented the rural faction, and seven represented the urban faction. This pivotal event remains shrouded in mystery because its outcome has become an object of contention (and considerable historical rewriting) between pro-Vietnamese and anti-Vietnamese Khmer communist factions. The party was renamed the Workers Party of Kampuchea at the meeting. The question of cooperation with, or resistance to, Sihanouk was thoroughly discussed. A new party structure was adopted, and for the first time, a permanent Central Committee was appointed with Tou Samouth (who advocated a policy of cooperation) as the party's general secretary. The newly formed party was anti-Vietnamese.

His ally Nuon Chea (Long Reth) became deputy general secretary. At the same time, Pol Pot and Ieng Sary were named to the Central Committee to occupy the third and the fifth highest positions in the party hierarchy. Another committee member was veteran communist Keo Meas. In Democratic Kampuchea, this meeting would later be projected as the founding date of the party, consciously downplaying the history of the party before Pol Pot's ascent to leadership.

On 20 July 1962, Tou Samouth was murdered by the Cambodian government. At the WPK's second congress in February 1963, Pol Pot was chosen to succeed Tou Samouth as the party's general secretary. Tou's allies Nuon Chea and Keo Meas were removed from the Central Committee and replaced by Son Sen and Vorn Vet. From then on, Pol Pot and loyal allies from his Paris student days controlled the party center, edging out older veterans whom they considered excessively pro-Vietnamese.

=== Insurgency in rural Cambodia ===
In July 1963, Pol Pot and most of the central committee left Phnom Penh to establish an insurgent base in Ratanakiri Province in the northeast. Pol Pot had shortly before been put on a list of thirty-four leftists whom Sihanouk summoned to join the government and sign statements saying Sihanouk was the only possible leader for the country. Pol Pot and Chou Chet were the only people who escaped. All the others agreed to cooperate with the government and were afterwards under 24-hour watch by the police.

In the mid-1960s, the United States Department of State estimated the party membership to be approximately 100.

The region Pol Pot and the others moved to was inhabited by tribal minorities, the Khmer Loeu, whose rough treatment (including resettlement and forced assimilation) at the hands of the central government made them willing recruits for a guerrilla struggle. In 1965, Pol Pot made a visit of several months to North Vietnam and China. He probably received some training in China, which enhanced his prestige when he returned to the WPK's liberated areas. Despite friendly relations between Sihanouk and the Chinese, the latter kept Pol Pot's visit a secret from Sihanouk.

In 1971, the party changed its name to the Communist Party of Kampuchea (CPK). The party statutes, published in the mid-1970s, claim that the party congress approved the name change in 1971. The change in the party's name was a closely guarded secret. Lower-ranking members of the party and even the Vietnamese were not told of it, and neither was the membership until many years later. The party leadership endorsed an armed struggle against the government led by Sihanouk. In 1967, the CPK made several small-scale attempts at insurgency but failed with little success.

In 1968, the Khmer Rouge launched a national insurgency across Cambodia. Though North Vietnam had not been informed of the decision, its forces provided shelter and weapons to the Khmer Rouge after the insurgency started. The guerrilla forces of the party were baptized as the Kampuchean Revolutionary Army. Vietnamese support for the insurgency made it impossible for the ineffective and poorly motivated Royal Cambodian Army to counter it effectively.

=== Rise to power ===
The political appeal of the Khmer Rouge was increased as a result of the situation created by the removal of Sihanouk as head of state in 1970. Premier Lon Nol, with the support of the National Assembly, deposed Sihanouk. Sihanouk, in exile in Beijing, allied with the Kampuchean Communist Party and became the nominal head of a Khmer Rouge-dominated government-in-exile (known by its French acronym GRUNK) backed by the People's Republic of China. Sihanouk's popular support in rural Cambodia allowed the Khmer Rouge to extend its power and influence to the point that by 1973, it exercised de facto control over the majority of Cambodian territory, although only a minority of its population.

The relationship between the massive carpet bombing of Cambodia by the United States and the growth of the Khmer Rouge, in terms of recruitment and popular support, has been a matter of interest to historians. Some historians, including Michael Ignatieff, Adam Jones and Greg Grandin, have cited the United States' intervention and bombing campaign (spanning 1965–1973) as a significant factor which led to increased support for the Khmer Rouge among the Cambodian peasantry. According to Ben Kiernan, the Khmer Rouge "would not have won power without U.S. economic and military destabilization of Cambodia. ... It used the bombing's devastation and massacre of civilians as recruitment propaganda and as an excuse for its brutal, radical policies and its purge of moderate communists and Sihanoukists."

Pol Pot biographer David P. Chandler writes that the bombing "had the effect the Americans wanted – it broke the Communist encirclement of Phnom Penh", but it also accelerated the collapse of rural society and increased social polarization. Peter Rodman and Michael Lind claimed that the United States intervention saved the Lon Nol regime from collapse in 1970 and 1973. Craig Etcheson acknowledged that U.S. intervention increased recruitment for the Khmer Rouge but disputed that it was a primary cause of the Khmer Rouge victory. William Shawcross wrote that the United States' bombing and ground incursion plunged Cambodia into the chaos that Sihanouk had worked for years to avoid.

By 1973, Vietnamese support of the Khmer Rouge had largely disappeared. China armed and trained the Khmer Rouge both during the civil war and the years afterward.

When the United States Congress suspended military aid to the Lon Nol government in 1973, the Khmer Rouge made sweeping gains in the country, completely overwhelming the Khmer National Armed Forces. On 17 April 1975, the Khmer Rouge captured Phnom Penh and overthrew the Khmer Republic, executing all its officers.

== Khmer Rouge in power ==
The leadership of the Khmer Rouge was largely unchanged between the 1960s and the mid-1990s. The Khmer Rouge leaders were mostly from middle-class families and had been educated at French universities.

The Standing Committee of the Khmer Rouge's Central committee (Party Center) during its period of power consisted of the following:

- Brother number 1 Pol Pot (Saloth Sar) — General Secretary of the Communist Party of Kampuchea, 1963–1981; Prime Minister of Democratic Kampuchea, 1976–1979
- Brother number 2 Nuon Chea (Long Bunruot) — Deputy General Secretary of the Communist Party, President of the Kampuchean People's Representative Assembly
- Brother number 3 Ieng Sary — Deputy prime minister of Democratic Kampuchea; Minister of Foreign Affairs, 1975–1979
- Brother number 4 Khieu Samphan — Chairman of the State Presidium (head of state) of Democratic Kampuchea
- Brother number 5 Ta Mok (Chhit Chhoeun) — Leader of the National Army of Democratic Kampuchea; last Khmer Rouge leader, Southwest Regional Secretary
- Brother number 8 Ke Pauk — Regional Secretary of the Northern Zone
- Son Sen — Deputy Prime Minister of Democratic Kampuchea, Minister of Defense
- Yun Yat — Minister of Education, 1975–1977; Minister of Information (replaced Hu Nim in 1977)
- Ieng Thirith — Minister of Social Affairs, 1975–1979

In power, the Khmer Rouge carried out a radical program that included isolating the country from foreign influence, closing schools, hospitals, and factories, abolishing banking, finance and currency, outlawing all religions, confiscating all private property and relocating people from urban areas to collective farms where forced labor was widespread. This policy aimed to reform professional and urban Cambodians, or "New People", through agricultural labor under the supervision of the untainted rural "Old People". The goal was to develop an economy based on the export of rice to develop industry later. The party adopted the slogan: "If we have rice, we can have everything". These actions and policies resulted in massive deaths through executions, work exhaustion, illness, and starvation.

In Phnom Penh and other cities, the Khmer Rouge told residents that they would be moved only about "two or three kilometers" outside the city and would return in "two or three days". Some witnesses say they were told that the evacuation was because of the "threat of American bombing" and that they did not have to lock their houses since the Khmer Rouge would "take care of everything" until they returned. These were not the first evacuations of civilian populations by the Khmer Rouge. Similar evacuations of populations without possessions had occurred on a smaller scale since the early 1970s.

The Khmer Rouge attempted to turn Cambodia into a classless society by depopulating cities and forcing the urban population into agricultural communes through brutal totalitarian methods. The entire population was forced to become farmers in labour camps. During their four years in power, the Khmer Rouge overworked and starved the population while at the same time executing selected groups who had the potential to undermine the new state (including intellectuals) and killing many others for even minor breaches of rules.

Through the 1970s and especially after mid-1975, the party became increasingly paranoid, blaming failures caused by its agricultural policies on external enemies (usually the CIA and Vietnam) and domestic traitors. The resultant purges reached a crest in 1977 and 1978 when thousands, including some important CPK leaders, were executed. The older generation of CPK members, suspected of having links with or sympathies for Vietnam, were targeted by the Pol Pot leadership.

=== Angkar ===
For roughly two years after the CPK took power, it referred to itself as the Angkar (Khmer: អង្គការ, ALA-LC: ʿʹanggakār [ʔɑŋkaː]; meaning 'Organization'). However, Pol Pot publicly declared on 29 September 1977 the existence of the CPK in a five-hour-long speech. He revealed the true character of the supreme authority in Cambodia, an obscure ruling body that had been kept in seclusion.

The CPK had been extremely secretive throughout its existence. Before 1975, secrecy was needed for the party's survival. Pol Pot and his closest associates relied on continuing the extreme secrecy to consolidate their position against those they perceived as internal enemies during their first two years of power. The revelation of the CPK's existence shortly before Pol Pot was due to travel to Beijing resulted from pressure from China on the Khmer Rouge leaders to acknowledge their true political identity at a time when they increasingly depended on China's assistance against the threats from Vietnam.

Accordingly, Pol Pot, in his speech, claimed that the CPK's foundation had been in 1960 and emphasized its separate identity from the Communist Party of Vietnam. This secrecy continued even after the CPK took power. Unlike most totalitarian dictators, Pol Pot was not the object of an open personality cult. It was almost a year before it was confirmed that he was Saloth Sar, the man long cited as the CPK's general secretary.

== Fall of the Khmer Rouge ==
Because of several years of border conflict and the flood of refugees fleeing Cambodia, relations between Kampuchea and Vietnam deteriorated by December 1978. Fearing a Vietnamese attack, Pol Pot ordered a pre-emptive invasion of Vietnam on 18 April 1978. His Cambodian forces crossed the border and looted nearby villages. Despite Chinese aid, these Cambodian forces were repulsed by the Vietnamese.

In early 1979 a pro-Vietnamese group of CPK dissidents led by Pen Sovan held a congress (which they saw as the third party congress, therefore not recognizing the 1963, 1975, and 1978 party congresses as legitimate) near the Vietnamese border. Along with Heng Samrin, Pen Sovan was one of the foremost founding members of the Kampuchean United Front for National Salvation (KUFNS or FUNSK) after becoming disillusioned with the Khmer Rouge. Effectively, the CPK was then divided into two, with the Pen Sovan-led group constituting a separate party, the Kampuchean People's Revolutionary Party (now the Cambodian People's Party).

The Vietnamese forces invaded Cambodia along with the KUFNS, capturing Phnom Penh on 7 January 1979. The Pen Sovan-led party was installed as the governing party of the new People's Republic of Kampuchea. The CPK, led by Pol Pot, withdrew its forces westwards to an area near the Thai border. With unofficial protection from elements of the Thai Army, it began guerrilla warfare against the PRK government.

The party founded the Patriotic and Democratic Front of the Great National Union of Kampuchea as a united front in September 1979 to fight the PRK and the Vietnamese. Khieu Samphan led the front. In December 1979, the armed forces under the command of the party, what remained of the erstwhile People's National Liberation Armed Forces of Kampuchea, were renamed National Army of Democratic Kampuchea. In 1981, the party was dissolved and substituted by the Party of Democratic Kampuchea.

== Ideology ==
=== Under Pol Pot faction leadership ===
The CPK under Pol Pot supported communism and followed the communist ideologies of Marxism–Leninism, Stalinism and Maoism, the Khmer CPK also embraced agrarian socialism. Another core element of the CPK's ideology under Pol Pot was Khmer ultranationalism and even chauvinism, besides the fact that communists, mostly Marxist–Leninists reject ethnic chauvinism, examples are Great Russian chauvinism and Han chauvinism, due this and other factors Marxist–Leninists like Deng Xiaoping criticised the Khmer Rouge for engaging in "deviations from Marxism–Leninism", and due to their brutality however Deng couldn't understand why people wanted Pol Pot to be removed. Enver Hoxha referred to Pol Pot as a "barbarous fascist".

Ieng Sary, described the CPK as a foremost revolutionary party and not communist in the traditional indochinese sense, while other party members claimed the CPK is a Marxist–Leninist party. During the party's time of rule it was described as social fascist (feudal fascist) and nationalist Maoism. Years after the disestablishment of Democratic Kampuchea, Ieng Sary described the regime of Pol Pot as cruel and fascist.

Steven Michael DeBurger argues in his book "The Total Pol Pot Revolution" that his view of the "glorious Angkorean past" and his building of a new Angkor is in reality nearer to fascism and nazism rather to communism, Christopher Jones argues that the ideology of the Khmer Rouge can be described as a mixture of Das Kapital and Mein Kampf. Maurizio Lattanzio argues that Pol Pot and his "Khmer Communism" had Prussian elements and shared the same view as Ben Kiernan that it was a form of national communism, besides there ethno-nationalism, the CPK claimed to support proletarian internationalism, this however is highly disputed by other communists. Likewise it is debated, to what extent Pol Pot and CPK Leaders understood and adhered to communist theory in general.

== Organization ==
=== Structure ===
The Khmer Rouge were organized as the Communist Party of Kampuchea (CPK), its armed forces, and, from 1975, the state apparatus of Democratic Kampuchea. According to testimony before the Extraordinary Chambers in the Courts of Cambodia (ECCC), the Central Committee was the party’s most powerful organ and delegated its powers to the Standing Committee, which was known as the “Centre”, the “Organization”, or “Angkar”. Every structure in the party contained a committee led by a secretary, a deputy, and members.

In 1976, Democratic Kampuchea was divided into six zones: Northeast, East, Southwest, West, North and Northwest. Some regions had separate administrations reporting directly to the central state organization rather than to a zone. Kampong Som was administered separately as a city. Zone boundaries crossed provincial boundaries: the East Zone encompassed Svay Rieng and Prey Veng provinces, the part of Kampong Cham province on the left bank of the Mekong, Chhlong district in Kratie province, and part of Kandal province.

The armed forces were subordinate to the party leadership. A set of Santebal documents recorded 72,248 regular troops in nine divisions and four regiments in January 1976, in addition to zone-level regional forces and village militia. Internal security was handled through a separate network that included the S-21 prison, whose orders came from Office 870.

The structure changed over time. There were six original zones, and the administration after April 1975 used seven. From February 1977, Southwest Zone cadres entered other zones to purge local cadres. After the 1979 Vietnamese invasion the army was reconstituted as the National Army of Democratic Kampuchea (NADK). The party was dissolved on 6 December 1981 and succeeded by the Party of Democratic Kampuchea. The movement split in 1996, when Ieng Sary defected with an estimated half of its army

==== Party Organs ====
Kang Kek lew testified that the CPK had three statutes, issued in 1960, 1971, and 1976, and that the statute vested the highest level of operational authority in the Central Committee, within which the Standing Committee was the most powerful organ. The 1976 statute was adopted at the Fourth Congress in January 1976 and set out the party’s ideology, membership, structure, and organization. Kek lew testified that everyone on each committee had to be a party member. The relationship between the two committees is described inconsistently in testimony. The historian David Chandler testified that the Standing Committee was a smaller body whose membership overlapped with the Central Committee, that it met more often, and that the specific powers delegated to it were unclear. Investigato Craig Etcheson testified that the Standing Committee exercised total control of the government.

According to an ECCC guide to Case 002, Nuon Chea was deputy secretary of the CPK and a full-rights member of the Standing Committee, and Ieng Sary was a full-rights Standing Committee member. The ECCC stated that Khieu Samphan became a candidate member of the Central Committee in 1971 and a full-rights member in 1976, and was one of two members of Office 870. Son Sen was a member of the Central and Military Committees, a full-rights member of the Standing Committee, and chairman of the General Staff and Security. Ta Mok was second deputy of the CPK, deputy chair of the Military Committee, secretary of the Southwest Zone, and a member of the Central and Standing Committees. Vorn Vet was a member of the Central and Standing Committees and Deputy Prime Minister for Economics.

The Standing Committee’s daily work was conducted from Office 870 in Phnom Penh. An ECCC witness testified that “870” was a code for the Centre and that “Committee 870” referred to the Standing Committee, although the Trial Chamber could not make a definitive finding on whether the code referred to the Standing Committee or the Central Committee. By 1971 the code 870 was used for the party’s central echelon. A witness testified that Office 870 had been known as Office 100 before the capture of Phnom Penh. S-71, an administrative office of Office 870, oversaw sub-offices with code names beginning with “K”. Kek lew testified that S-71, led by Pang Bora, was the central committee office, and that Pang acted under the direct orders of Pol Pot.

The party communicated by mail, telephone, and magazines, and the monthly magazine Revolutionary Flag was distributed to the zones for party members. A former telecommunications witness stated that only the zones and autonomous sectors could report directly to the Centre or its telecommunications section. Messages from villages, communes, and districts went through the zones before reaching the telecommunications section. The CPK’s 1976 statute designated the Congress of Party Representatives as its highest governing body and the Central Committee as the highest authority between congresses. Article 6 established democratic centralism as the organizational principle of the party: lower bodies were subordinate to higher bodies, minorities to majorities, and all constituent organizations to the Central Committee. It required collective decision-making, individual responsibility for implementing decisions, periodic reports from subordinate organizations and directives from higher committees.

Within the central leadership, the Standing Committee exercised decision-making authority. Pol Pot served as secretary and Nuon Chea as deputy secretary. Ben Kiernan’s account of the leadership hierarchy, published by Yale University’s Cambodian Genocide Program, identifies Ieng Sary as the third-ranking leader in 1975–1976. Standing Committee minutes assigned responsibilities to individual members: the meeting of 9 October 1975 placed Ieng Sary in charge of both party and state foreign relations.

The statute provided for party organizations within government ministries, offices, workplaces, cooperatives and military units. Their basic organizational unit was the party cell. Under Article 9, cells containing three to eight members were led by a secretary and deputy secretary, while cells containing more than nine members were led by a cell committee. Cells could establish subordinate subcells. Article 7 designated the cell’s general assembly as its highest authority and its committee, or secretary and deputy secretary, as its leadership between assemblies.

Party organization within ministries was distinct from their administrative organization. A Foreign Ministry organizational chart reproduced in a contemporary internal diary placed Ieng Sary above a party cell committee and its subordinate subcells, alongside a separate administrative leadership committee and departmental offices. The diary recorded cell congresses, subcell meetings and assignments to cell committees, as well as party supervision of the Communist Youth League and the Pillar Organization.

The military had its own party committees and cells corresponding to its command structure. The statute specified company cells and committees at battalion, regiment and division levels. For forces under central command, membership applications proceeded through these bodies to the High Command’s party committee; for zone forces, the corresponding final authority was the zone party committee. Separate provisions covered regional forces, militia and units not organized into the full sequence of military formations.

Admission to the party required examination and collective approval by several organizational levels. For personnel in offices and ministries attached to the Central Committee, the statute required approval from the cell, the office or ministry party committee, the Control Commission of the Central Committee’s Organizational Committee, and the Organizational Committee itself. Candidates underwent probation lasting six or twelve months, after which the responsible bodies reviewed their admission to full membership. All members, including senior officials, were required to belong to a cell and attend its monthly meetings.

===== Territorial Administration =====
Territory was divided into zones, which were subdivided into sectors, districts, and communes. By 1977, Cambodia’s existing administrative divisions comprised 19 provinces: Stung Treng, Ratanak Kiri, Mondul Kiri, Kratie, Kampong Cham, Svay Rieng, Prey Veng, Kandal, Takeo, Kampot, Koh Kong, Kampong Speu, Kampong Chhnang, Kampong Thom, Preah Vihear, Oddar Meanchey, Siem Reap, Pursat and Battambang. These were subdivided into 112 districts, 1,160 subdistricts and villages. During the Cambodian Civil War, the Khmer Rouge established zones and regions superimposed on these divisions. According to Democratic Kampuchea’s Ministry of Education, the new divisions were intended to facilitate communications, administration and the implementation of revolutionary tasks. Cooperatives were also established during the war. The zone-and-region system was retained after the capture of Phnom Penh on 17 April 1975.

Kek lew testified that each zone had its own Standing Committee led by a zone secretary, and that sectors, districts, and communes (later called cooperatives) each had committees headed by a secretary. He described the statutory chain of command as running from the mobile or work-unit leader to the commune or cooperative committee, then the district, sector, and zone committees, and then the Central Committee, with each level obliged to report to the next above it. According to Kek lew, instructions were issued down the same chain. Zone secretaries were generally appointed by the Centre. Zone committees were responsible for implementing party policy, administering personnel and property within their territories, and receiving reports from subordinate committees. They could select members of the zone leadership subject to Central Committee approval. Zone secretaries could also appoint or remove other zone committee members with the Central Committee’s approval, while appointments and demotions within sector committees required authorization from the zone committee.

Within the zone leadership, the deputy secretary generally oversaw security, while another committee member was responsible for economic affairs. Autonomous sectors likewise had a secretary, deputy secretary and committee member. Zone secretaries belonged to the Central Committee, linking the territorial administration to the central party leadership

In addition to the six original zones, there were autonomous sectors and special municipal regions under military authority. In early April 1975 the Southwest Zone was split into the West and Southwest Zones. The administration after April 1975 comprised seven zones (Northwest, North, Northeast, East, Southwest, West, and Center) and two special regions, Kratie Special Region 505 and, until mid-1977, Siem Reap Special Region 106. Kek lew testified that a new North Zone, numbered 801, was created in 1977, and that the zones were considered a temporary division to be abolished once the central command could govern directly. He also stated that the independent sectors reported directly to the party secretary or deputy secretary. The ECCC recorded the following zone leaders: Ta Mok in the Southwest, Ke Pauk in the Central (old North) Zone, and Ruos Nhim in the Northwest.

Office 870 served the central party leadership and was not a territorial subdivision. The designation “870” was also used for the Party Centre. Political Office 870 coordinated communications between the leadership and subordinate organizations, while the Government Office, also designated S-71, performed administrative functions for the central leadership. These offices were distinct from the zone, sector and district committees.

Standing Committee records identified Doeun as head of Political Office 870 and Pang as responsible for the Government Office. Testimony before the Extraordinary Chambers in the Courts of Cambodia used “Office 870” inconsistently: some witnesses associated its leadership with Pang, while others distinguished his responsibilities from those of Doeun. In its account of Rochoem Ton’s testimony, the court noted the difference between his identification of Pang as head of Office 870 and the positions recorded in the Standing Committee’s minutes.

== See also ==
- Bibliography of the Cambodian genocide
- Communist Youth League of Kampuchea
- Party of Democratic Kampuchea
