= Son Sen =

Cambodian Communist politician and soldier (1930–1997)

Deputy Prime Minister of Democratic Kampuchea
- In office 14 April 1976 – 7 January 1979
- Prime Minister: Pol Pot

Minister of National Defence
- In office 15 January 1976 – 7 January 1979
- Prime Minister: Pol Pot
- Preceded by: Sak Sutsakhan
- Succeeded by: Pen Sovan

Personal details
- Born: 12 June 1930 Trà Vinh, Cochinchina, French Indochina
- Died: 10 June 1997 (aged 66) Anlong Veng District, Oddar Meanchey, Cambodia
- Cause of death: Execution by shooting
- Party: Communist Party of Kampuchea
- Spouse: Yun Yat

Son Sen (Khmer: សុន សេន pronounced [son seːn]; 12 June 1930 – 10 June 1997), alias Comrade Khieu (សមមិត្តខៀវ) or "Brother Number 89", was a Cambodian Communist politician and soldier. A member of the Central Committee of the Communist Party of Kampuchea/Party of Democratic Kampuchea, the Khmer Rouge, from 1974 to 1992, Sen oversaw the Party's security apparatus, including the Santebal secret police and the notorious security prison S-21 at Tuol Sleng.

Son Sen was responsible for ordering the massacre of more than 100,000 people in the Eastern Zone of Cambodia during the last six months of 1978.

Sen was married to Yun Yat, who became the Party's minister of education and information. Along with the rest of his family, he was killed on the orders of Pol Pot during a 1997 factional split in the Khmer Rouge.

== Early life ==
Son Sen was born in the village of Luong Hoa, Trà Vinh Province in southern Vietnam to a minor landowning family. Although the Khmer Institute described Sen as being of "Sino-Vietnamese" descent, Béréziat and others have confirmed that like several other Khmer Rouge leaders he was of Khmer Krom ethnicity. From 1946 he attended a teacher training college in Phnom Penh, and in the 1950s received a scholarship to study in Paris, where he became a member of a Marxist group of Cambodian students centred on Saloth Sar (alias Pol Pot), Ieng Sary, and Hou Yuon. Along with other members of the group, Sen was influenced by the radical line pursued by the French Communist Party.

Sen's academic record was relatively mediocre, and in May 1956 the authorities withdrew his scholarship due to his continued participation in political activity. Returning to Cambodia with a teaching certificate, he taught for a time at the Lycee Sisowath, and went on to become director of studies of the National Teaching Institute, part of the University of Phnom Penh. By 1960 he had also, however, joined the clandestine Cambodian Communist Party, then known as the Khmer People's Revolutionary Party and led by Tou Samouth.

== In the maquis ==
Son Sen's political views, which opposed the ruling Sangkum regime of Prince Norodom Sihanouk, were soon to affect his career. In 1962 he was removed from his post at the Institute after being accused of spreading anti-Sangkum ideas amongst the students, though he was permitted to continue teaching and was appointed principal of a high school in Takéo Province. By 1963, when Saloth Sar took over the Communist Party leadership, a number of leftists were beginning to escape Phnom Penh for the countryside; Sen went underground and was to follow them in 1964, hidden in the car boot of a Chinese diplomatic vehicle.

Sen was initially to join Saloth Sar and other former colleagues at a Vietnamese Communist military base called Office 100, located in the border areas of Cambodia. There are indications that he was soon sent to the remote, malarial Ratanakiri Province, in the far north-east of the country, in order to build up anti-government activity amongst the Khmer Loeu tribesmen. By the later 1960s, Sen – with increasing experience of guerrilla warfare – had built up a reputation as a talented field commander, and had risen to a senior rank within the Party. In 1968, he was responsible for several successful uprisings in the south-west of the country, and was reported to be the chief of the political committee for Kampot, Takéo and Kampong Speu.

== Chief of Staff of Khmer Rouge forces ==
After the Cambodian coup of 1970, and the subsequent establishment of the Khmer Republic under Lon Nol, Sihanouk was to join with his former Communist enemies in forming the GRUNK, a Beijing-based government-in-exile. The Khmer Rouge's forces were soon to be swelled by thousands of new recruits, attracted in part by Sihanouk's name. Son Sen, whilst not a prominent member of the GRUNK, had considerable power thanks to his high position in the government's forces on the ground – CPNLAF, the Cambodian People's National Liberation Armed Forces. Along with Ieng Sary, he was responsible for the North-Eastern Zone, the stronghold of the Party 'Centre'.

By 1972 Son Sen had become Chief of Staff of the Khmer Rouge forces. Despite occasional criticisms – his colleagues found his style peremptory and his point of view "bourgeois", and he was openly criticised by Hou Yuon at the Party's 1971 Congress – his devotion to Saloth Sar and his closeness to the Party 'Centre' guaranteed his senior position.

== Democratic Kampuchea ==
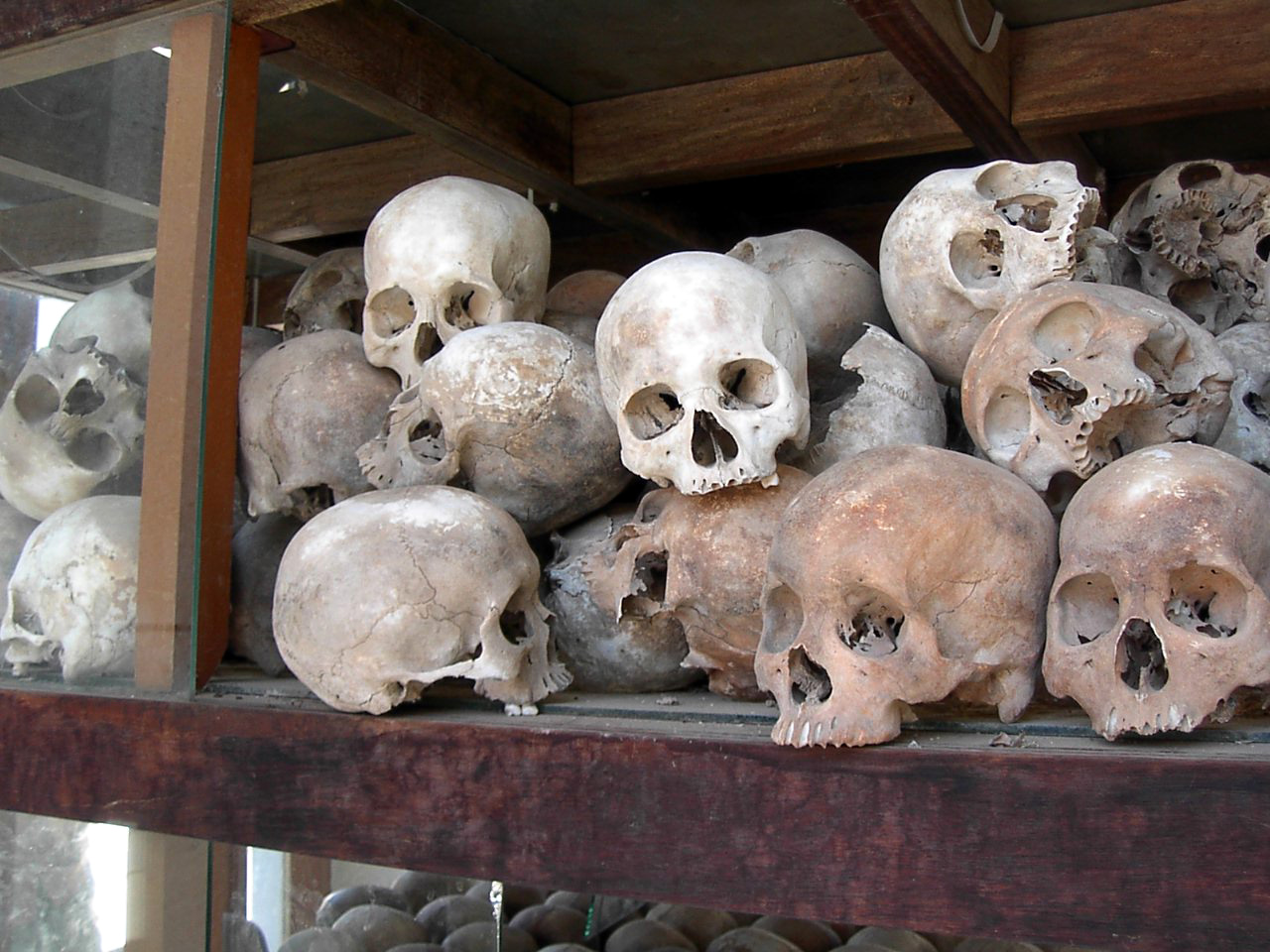
Skulls of victims of Son Sen's Khmer Rouge security apparatus. Choeung Ek.

After the Khmer Rouge captured Phnom Penh in April 1975, Son Sen was appointed Deputy Prime Minister with responsibility for Defense. Responsible for internal security, he also oversaw the Santebal – the Khmer Rouge secret police. As such he monitored the operations of the infamous S-21 prison at Tuol Sleng, and engaged actively in the design of its interrogation and torture procedures. Son Sen's role meant that he was particularly closely implicated in the many thousands of deaths that occurred in this period due to the arrest and execution of perceived enemies of the regime. His memoranda to his subordinate Kang Kek Iew, and notes taken during study sessions overseen by Sen for S-21 cadres, reveal his continued interest in history, deeply anti-Vietnamese views, and revolutionary zeal, along with a "schoolmasterish attention to detail". These were combined with a brutally ruthless streak; Sen was reputed to have once been so angry with Foreign Minister Ieng Sary that he unsuccessfully attempted to have him murdered.

The Party's paranoia with regard to security, and its obsessive secrecy, led many senior Khmer Rouge cadres to be identified in internal documents by pseudonyms or numbers: Son Sen was often referred to as "Khieu", and his wife as "At". He was also identified as "Brother 89" on letters and memoranda.

Sen's other main duties in this period involved reorganising the CPNLAF forces into a cohesive national army, the Revolutionary Army of Kampuchea. By 1977–78, he was overseeing an increasing series of clashes with Vietnamese forces along the border, as well as mounting a massive purge of Eastern Zone cadres considered to have Vietnamese links. As the ongoing war with the Vietnamese began to go increasingly badly for the Democratic Kampuchean forces, however, Sen began to fall under suspicion himself, and may well have become a victim of his own security apparatus if the 1979 Vietnamese invasion had not intervened. In particular, he had been implicated by the Party's internal security in several "traitorous" activities including the 1978 murder of the British academic Malcolm Caldwell.

== Commander of the NADK ==
Following the Vietnamese invasion and the establishment of a pro-Vietnamese regime in Phnom Penh, Sen was to re-establish his control over the Khmer Rouge forces, now operating against the Vietnamese and the forces of the People's Republic of Kampuchea from bases in the Cardamom Mountains.

By August 1985, when the 'retirement' of Pol Pot was officially announced, Son Sen assumed supreme command of the National Army of Democratic Kampuchea, as it was now called. During this period Sen had occasional contact with the commanders of the other armed groups within the Coalition Government of Democratic Kampuchea; the Khmer People's National Liberation Armed Forces under Sak Sutsakhan, and the ANS armed wing of the royalist FUNCINPEC, commanded by Norodom Ranarridh. There was occasional coordination between the Sen's NADK and the ANS in particular, though the Khmer Rouge forces remained easily the strongest element in the coalition (and periodically attacked ANS and KPNLAF forces).

== After 1991 and death ==
Following the Paris Peace Agreements of October 1991, Son Sen and Khieu Samphan traveled to Phnom Penh to negotiate with UNTAC and the Cambodian government in Phnom Penh. Sen was made a member of the Supreme National Council which was set up to protect the country's independence until UN-supervised elections could take place, and seems to have been more determined than most Khmer Rouge leaders to ensure that they were reintegrated into normal national politics. However, as a result Sen was removed from power in May 1992 by Ta Mok, after a dispute with fellow Khmer Rouge leaders over whether to continue the negotiations. From 1992 to 1997 he had relatively little influence within the Khmer Rouge.

He was murdered on 10 June 1997, alongside 13 members of his family, including children, on orders of Pol Pot, who at the time was fighting his last battle to regain control of the Khmer Rouge from Ta Mok. Pol Pot is thought to have believed that Sen was in negotiations with government forces to surrender, specifically being in contact with then-Second Prime Minister Hun Sen; he ordered Son Sen and his family to be shot, after which trucks drove over their bodies back-and-forth and at high speed. Pol Pot later claimed to be remorseful over Sen and his family's murder, stating that "I feel sorry for that. That was a mistake that occurred when we put our plan into practice. I feel sorry".

== See also ==
- Cambodia under Pol Pot
- First Indochina War
- Vietnam War (Second Indochina War)
- Tuol Sleng Genocide Museum
- Cambodian Civil War
- Killing Fields
- The Killing Fields (Hollywood film)
- First They Killed My Father by Loung Ung
- Enemies of the People (film)

== Bibliography ==
- Béréziat, Gilbert (2008), Cambodge 1945–2005: Soixante années d'hypocrisie des grands, L'Harmattan, ISBN 2296079474
- Kiernan, Ben (2004), How Pol Pot came to power, Yale University Press, ISBN 9780300102628
