= Ke Pauk =

Khmer Rouge leader

- Born: Ke Vin; 1935; Kampong Thom Province, Cambodia, French Indochina
- Died: 15 February 2002 (aged 66–67); Anlong Veng, Oddar Meanchey, Cambodia
- Occupation: Khmer Rouge leader

Ke Pauk (Khmer: កែ ពក, 1935 – 15 February 2002), also known as Kae Pok, was one of the senior leaders of the Khmer Rouge.

== Early life ==
He was born Ke Vin (Khmer: កែ វិន) in Chhouk Ksach Village, Chhouk Ksach Sub-district, Baray District, Kampong Thom Province in 1935.

In 1949, following a raid on his village by French forces, Pauk joined the Khmer Issarak independence movement. In 1954, following the Geneva Conference and Cambodia's independence from France, Pauk emerged from the forest and was soon arrested. Sentenced to six years in prison he served time in prisons in Phnom Penh and Kampong Thom. However, after spending only three years in prison, Pauk was released.

After his release in 1957, Pauk returned to Chhouk Ksach and married Soeun. Together they were to have six children. His biography states that he was contacted at this time by Party Secretary Siv Heng and asked to rejoin the movement. Pauk joined the nascent Cambodian Communist movement in Svay Teab, Chamkar Leu District, Kampong Cham.

== Death ==
Pauk died, apparently of natural causes, while asleep in his home at Anlong Veng on 15 February 2002.
