= Party of Democratic Kampuchea =

Political party in Cambodia (1981–1994)

Party of Democratic Kampuchea គណបក្សកម្ពុជាប្រជាធិបតេយ្យ
- Abbreviation: PDK
- General Secretary: Pol Pot (1981–1985); Khieu Samphan (1985–1993)
- Spokesperson: Khieu Samphan
- Founded: December 1981
- Banned: July 1994
- Preceded by: Communist Party of Kampuchea
- Succeeded by: Cambodian National Unity Party
- Headquarters: Phnom Penh (de jure)
- Military wing: National Army of Democratic Kampuchea
- Ideology: Khmer ultranationalism; Chauvinism; Anti-Vietnamese sentiment; Democratic socialism (self-claimed); Communism (claimed renunciation; debated); Marxism–Leninism (claimed renunciation; debated); Maoism (claimed renunciation; debated); Agrarian socialism (claimed renunciation; debated)
- National affiliation: Patriotic and Democratic Front of the Great National Union of Kampuchea
- Slogan: "National Independence, Democracy, and Socialism"

Party flag

The Party of Democratic Kampuchea was a political party in Cambodia, formed as a continuation of the Communist Party of Kampuchea in December 1981. In the mid-1980s, it publicly claimed that its ideology was "a new form of democratic socialism", having ostensibly renounced Marxism–Leninism.

== History ==
According to the party, the Communist Party of Kampuchea's dissolution and the Party of Democratic Kampuchea's formation were prompted by the need for broader unity against Vietnam, a unity that an explicit communist line would hamper. The National Army of Democratic Kampuchea was the armed wing of the party, while the Patriotic and Democratic Front of the Great National Union of Kampuchea was a mass organization controlled by it.

At the time of the formation of the Party of Democratic Kampuchea, the Khmer Rouge forces had been pushed back by the Vietnamese-backed KPRP government to an area near the Thai border. The Party of Democratic Kampuchea began cooperating with other anti-Vietnamese factions and formed the Coalition Government of Democratic Kampuchea in 1982.

The party's General Secretary at the time was Pol Pot. The party led the deposed Democratic Kampuchea government. Its followers were generally called Khmer Rouge. Although Pol Pot relinquished party leadership to Khieu Samphan in 1985, he continued to wield considerable influence over the movement.

Ahead of the 1992–1993 elections, the Party of Democratic Kampuchea was largely succeeded by the Cambodian National Unity Party (CNUP), which publicly stated its wish to participate in the elections but eventually did not register and vowed to sabotage the election. Subsequently, UNTAC decided not to conduct elections in areas under Party of Democratic Kampuchea control. At the time, it was estimated that approximately six per cent of the population in Cambodia lived in areas under Party of Democratic Kampuchea control.

The Party of Democratic Kampuchea was declared illegal in July 1994, after which its activities continued under the Cambodian National Unity Party and the self-proclaimed Provisional Government of National Union and National Salvation of Cambodia.

== See also ==
- Coalition Government of Democratic Kampuchea
- Phnom Malai
