= Anlong Veng District =

Anlong Veng ស្រុកអន្លង់វែង
- District (Srok)
- Location in Cambodia
- Coordinates: 14°14′N 104°05′E
- Country: Cambodia
- Province: Oddar Meanchey

Population (2018)
  - Total: 70,000
- Time zone: UTC+7 (ICT)
- Geocode: 2201

Anlong Veng (Khmer: អន្លង់វែង, Ânlông Vêng [ɑnluŋ ʋɛːŋ]) is a district (srok) in Oddar Meanchey province in Cambodia. The main town in the district is also called Anlong Veng. The population of the district could not be counted during the 1998 census of Cambodia due to ongoing conflict during the time of the census. It is estimated that 35% of the population in Anlong Veng were former Khmer Rouge soldiers including the Maoist leader and dictator Saloth Sâr (Pol Pot).

== Geographic data ==
Anlong Veng is in the area of the Dângrêk Mountains, in the far north of Cambodia. It is located 125 km north of Siem Reap and close to the international border crossing with Thailand. There is a dam just north of the town.

== History ==
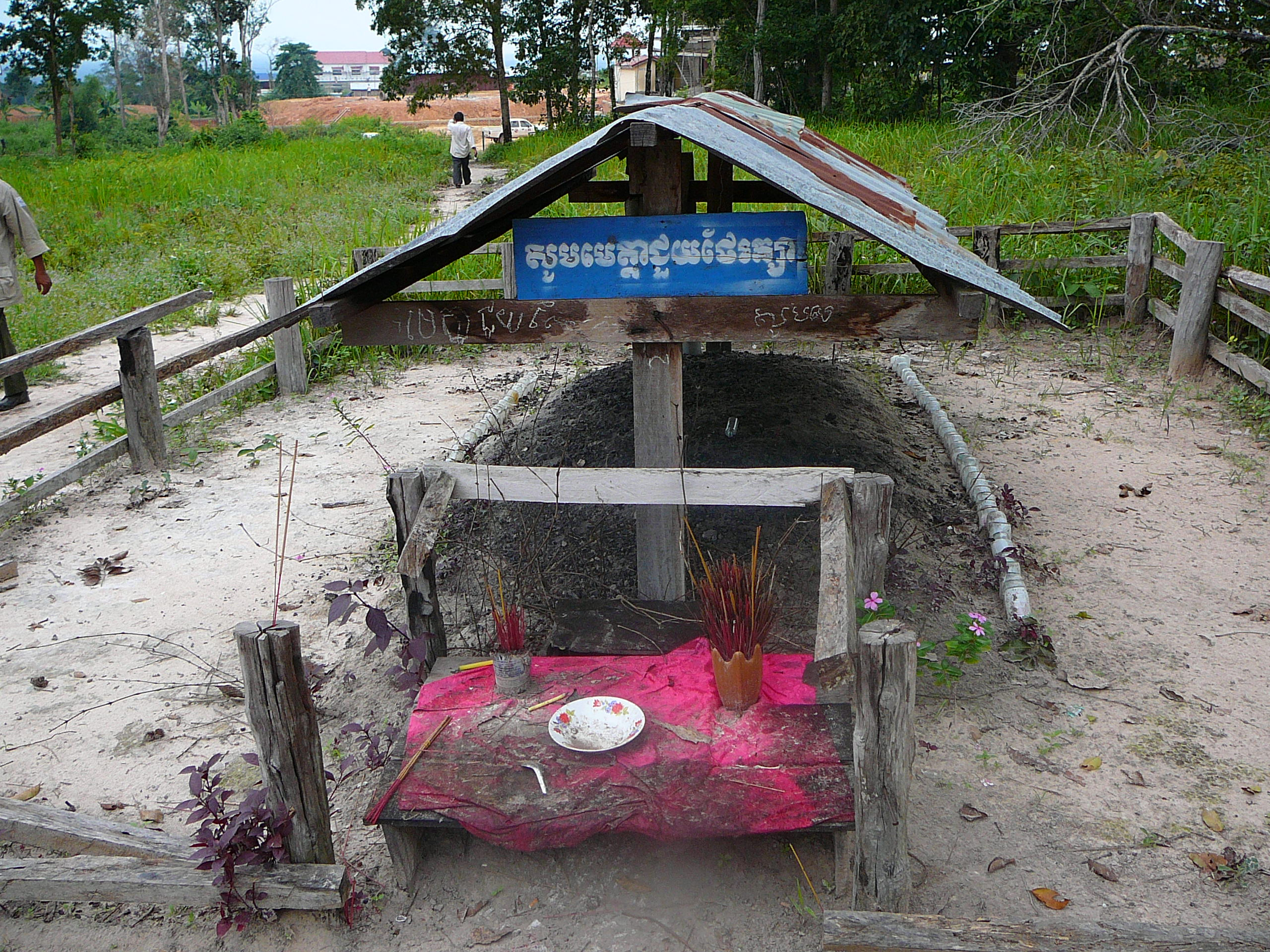
Grave of Khmer Rouge leader and Cambodian dictator Pol Pot.

Anlong Veng is best known for two historical reasons. It was the last stronghold of the Khmer Rouge to come under government control in 1998 and the final resting place of Pol Pot.

The Dângrêk Mountains were used as a base by the Khmer Rouge when they fought against the Khmer Republic led by general Lon Nol.

After the end of the Vietnamese occupation of Cambodia and the withdrawal of the Vietnamese army, the Khmer Rouge rebuilt their former bases in the Dangrek mountain range area, along the border of Thailand. Anlong Veng became for a while the main "capital" of the Khmer Rouge. In the 1990s the Khmer Rouge still controlled Anlong Veng, where there was one of the first "Killing Fields" after the fall of "Democratic Kampuchea".

There is a still not excavated site in a forest with landmines in the Dângrêk Mountains, located about 6 km out of Anlong Veng where 3,000 people were allegedly killed by the Khmer Rouge for having become "corrupted" as late as between 1993 and 1997, because of the orders of Pol Pot. These executions were carried out during Ta Mok's leadership in the area, when Pol Pot orders Son Sen to be killed until Ta Mok forced Pol Pot to stop in June 1997 by placing him under house arrest.

== Administration ==
The following table shows the villages of Anlong Veng district by commune.

Khum (Communes)	Phum (Villages)
Anlong Veng	Kaoh Thmei, Ou Chenhchien, Prolean, Yeang Khang Tbong, Thnal Kandal Kraom, Thnal Kandal Leu, Thnal Totueng, Thnal Bambaek, Thnal Kaeng, Akphivoad, Rumchek, Yeang Khang Chheung, Thnal Thmey, Rumchek Khang Kert, Ou Ta Meng, Rumchek Khang Lech
Trapeang Tav	Trapeang Tav, Ta Dev, Ou Angrae, Slaeng Por, Tuol Prasat, Tuol Svay, Thmei, Tumnob, Ou SrorMor, Tuol Svay Saen Chey
Trapeang Prei	Tuol Kandal, Tuol Sala, Aekakpheap, Boeng, Cheung Phnum, Khleang Kandal, Prasat, Santepheap, Srah Chhuk, Tuol Tbaeng, Tumnob Leu, Tuek Chob, Tuek Chum
Thlat	Chheu Teal Chrum, Ou Run, Svay Chek, Thlat, Tuol Kruos, Tuol Kralanh, Tuol Prich, Thmei
Lumtong	Lumtong, Treas, Ou Kokir Kandal, Ou Kokir Kraom, Ou Kokir Leu, Lumtong Thmei, Sror LaoSroang, Trapaeng Thom, Chub Ta Mok, Kork Samphor, Char

== Development ==
Prime-minister Hun Sen's Historical Restoration Initiative circular (Dec 2001) called for the site at Anlong Veng to become a memorial and tourist site in time for the Visit Cambodia year in 2003. The town is seen by the government as a useful stopping point for tours from Siem Riep to the 11th-century temples at Preah Vihear. The site has had minor tourist developments including museums, hotels and a casino.
