= Khieu Samphan =

Cambodian politician and war criminal (born 1931)

- ខៀវ សំផន
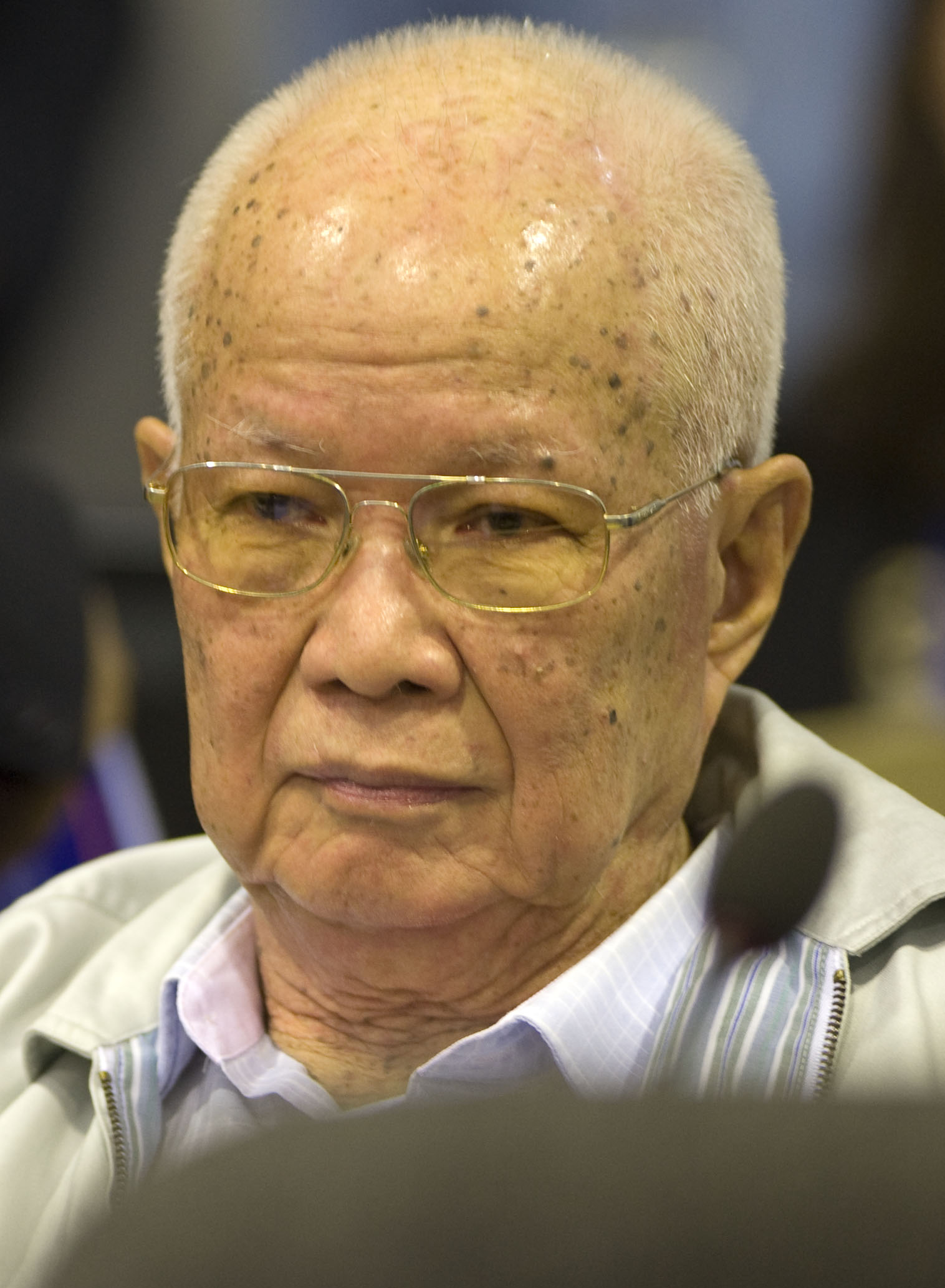
- Samphan in 2014

Chairman of the State Presidium of Democratic Kampuchea
- In office 13 April 1976 – 7 January 1979
- Prime Minister: Pol Pot
- Deputy: So Phim (First Vice President); Nhim Ros (Second Vice President)
- Leader: Pol Pot (CPK General Secretary)
- Preceded by: Norodom Sihanouk (as President of the State Presidium)
- Succeeded by: Heng Samrin (as Chairman of the People's Revolutionary Council)

Prime Minister of Democratic Kampuchea
- Acting; 4 April 1976 – 14 April 1976
- President: Norodom Sihanouk
- Leader: Pol Pot (CPK General Secretary)
- Preceded by: Penn Nouth
- Succeeded by: Pol Pot

Prime Minister of the Provisional Government of National Union and National Salvation of Cambodia
- In office 1994–1998

Leader of the Cambodian National Unity Party
- In office 1992–1997
- Preceded by: Office established
- Succeeded by: Himself (as Leader of the Khmer National Solidarity Party)

General Secretary of the Party of Democratic Kampuchea
- In office 1985–1993
- Preceded by: Pol Pot
- Succeeded by: Himself (as Leader of the Cambodian National Unity Party)

Vice Prime Minister and Minister of Defense of the Royal Government of National Union of Kampuchea
- In office 5 May 1970 – 14 July 1975

Personal details
- Born: 27 July 1931 (age 95) Romduol, Svay Rieng, Cambodia, French Indochina
- Party: KNSP (1997–1998); CNUP (1993–1997); PDK (1981–1993); CPK (1967–1981); Sangkum (1958–1967)
- Spouse: So Socheat
- Education: University of Montpellier (BEc); University of Paris (PhD)
- Criminal information
- Convictions: Crimes against humanity; Genocide
- Penalty: Life imprisonment (2014)
- Supreme Leader of Democratic Kampuchea (27 December 1979 – 22 June 1982): ← Pol Pot; (Last in role) →

Khieu Samphan (Khmer: ខៀវ សំផន; born 27 July 1931) is a Cambodian former politician, economist, and revolutionary who was Chairman of the State Presidium of Democratic Kampuchea from 1976 until 1979. As such, he served as Cambodia's head of state and was one of the most powerful officials in the Khmer Rouge movement, although Pol Pot remained the General Secretary of the Communist Party of Kampuchea. On 7 August 2014, along with other members of the regime, he was convicted and received a life sentence for crimes against humanity during the Cambodian genocide, and a further trial found him guilty of genocide in 2018.

Prior to joining the Khmer Rouge, he was a member of Norodom Sihanouk's Sangkum government. After the 1967 Samlaut Uprising, Sihanouk ordered the arrest of leftists including Samphan, who fled into hiding until the Khmer Rouge takeover in 1975. Samphan succeeded Pol Pot as leader of the Khmer Rouge in 1985, and served in this position until 1998.

With the death of Kang Kek Iew in 2020, Samphan became the last living senior Khmer Rouge official.

== Life and career ==
Khieu Samphan was born in Svay Rieng province to Khieu Long, who served as a judge under the French protectorate government, and his wife Por Kong. Samphan was of Khmer-Chinese extraction, having inherited his Chinese heritage from his maternal grandfather. When Samphan was a young boy, Khieu Long was found guilty of corruption and sentenced to imprisonment, leaving Samphan's mother to take up a living selling fruits and vegetables in Kampong Cham province where he grew up. Nevertheless, Samphan managed to earn a seat at the Lycée Sisowath and was able to travel to France to pursue his university studies in Economics at the University of Montpellier, after which he earned a PhD at the University of Paris.

Samphan became a member of the circle of leftist Khmer intellectuals studying at the University of Paris in the 1950s. His 1959 doctoral thesis Cambodia's Economy and Industrial Development advocated national self-reliance and generally sided with dependency theorists in blaming the wealthy, industrialized states for the poverty of the Third World. He was one of the founders of the Khmer Students' Association (KSA), out of which grew the left-wing revolutionary movements that would so alter Cambodian history in the 1970s, most notably the Khmer Rouge. Once the KSA was shuttered by French authorities in 1956, he founded yet another student organization, the Khmer Students' Union.

Returning from Paris with his doctorate in 1959, Samphan held a law faculty position at the University of Phnom Penh and started L'Observateur, a French-language leftist publication that was viewed with hostility by the government. L'Observateur was banned by the government in the following year and police publicly humiliated Samphan by beating, undressing and photographing him in public. Despite this, Samphan was invited to join Prince Norodom Sihanouk's Sangkum, a 'national movement' that operated as the single political party within Cambodia. Samphan stood as a Sangkum deputy in the 1962, 1964 and 1966 elections, in which the lattermost the rightist elements of the party, led by Lon Nol, gained an overwhelming victory. During his tenure, according to Minister of Information Trinh Hoanh, he was known as "a modest man of relatively humble origins who, even while minister of economy, refused to be driven in a Government limousine". In 1966, he then became a member of a 'Counter-Government' created by Sihanouk to keep the rightists under control. However, Samphan's radicalism led to a split in the party and he had to flee to a jungle after an arrest warrant was issued against him. At the time, he was even rumoured to have been murdered by Sihanouk's security forces.

In the 1970 Cambodian coup d'état, the National Assembly voted to remove Prince Sihanouk as head of state, and the Khmer Republic was proclaimed later that year. The Khmer Rouge, including Samphan, joined forces with the now-deposed Prince Sihanouk in establishing an anti-Khmer Republic coalition known as the National United Front of Kampuchea (FUNK), and an associated government: the Royal Government of the National Union of Kampuchea (GRUNK). In this alliance with his former enemies, Samphan served as deputy prime minister, minister of defence, and commander-in-chief of the Cambodian People's National Liberation Armed Forces, the GRUNK military. FUNK defeated the Khmer Republic in April 1975 and took control of all of Kampuchea.

During the years of the Khmer Rouge-led Democratic Kampuchea (1975–1979), Samphan remained near the top of the movement, assuming the post of president of the central presidium in 1976. His faithfulness to Pol Pot meant that he survived the purges in the later years of the Khmer Rouge rule. His roles within the party suggest he was well entrenched in the upper echelons of the Communist Party of Kampuchea, and a leading figure in the ruling elite.

In 1985, he officially succeeded Pol Pot as leader of the Khmer Rouge, and served in this position until 1998. In December 1998, Samphan and former Pol Pot deputy Nuon Chea surrendered to the Cambodian government. Prime Minister Hun Sen, however, defied international pressure and Samphan was not arrested or prosecuted at the time of his surrender.

== Arrest and trial ==
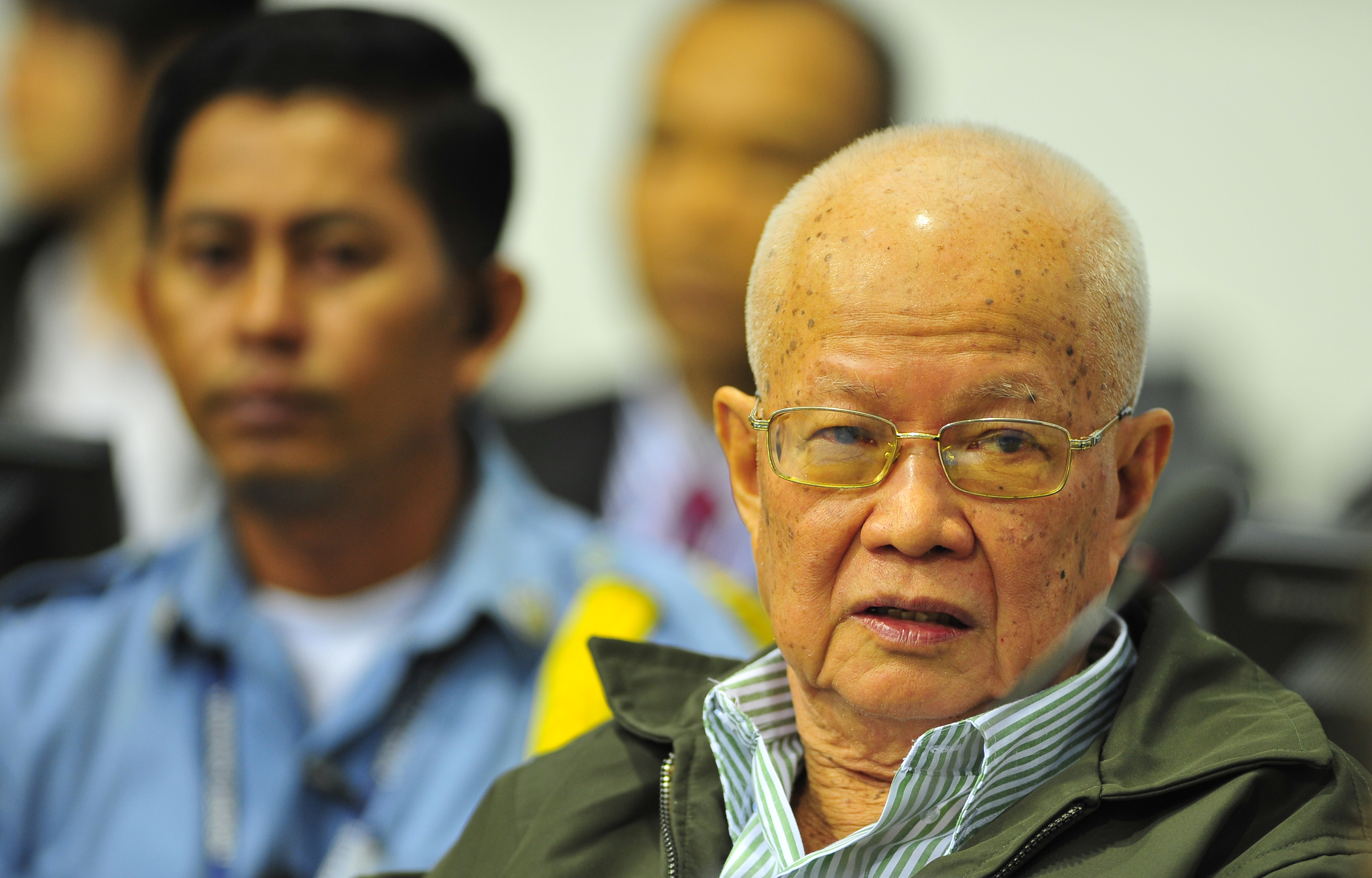
Samphan at a public hearing before the pre-trial Khmer Rouge Tribunal on 28 June 2011

On 13 November 2007, the 76-year-old Samphan reportedly suffered a stroke. This occurred one day after the Khmer Rouge co-leader Ieng Sary and his wife, Ieng Thirith, were arrested for war crimes committed while they were in power. At about the same time, a book by Samphan, Reflection on Cambodian History Up to the Era of Democratic Kampuchea, was published; in the book, he wrote that he had worked for social justice and the defence of national sovereignty, while attributing responsibility for all of the group's policies to Pol Pot.

According to Samphan, under the Khmer Rouge, "there was no policy of starving people. Nor was there any direction set out for carrying out mass killings", and "there was always close consideration of the people's well-being". He acknowledged the use of coercion to produce food due to shortages. Samphan also strongly criticized the current government in the book, blaming it for corruption and social ills.

Historian Ben Kiernan stated that Samphan's protestations (such as he regarded the collectivization of agriculture as a surprise, and his expressions of sympathy for Hu Nim, a fellow member of the CPK hierarchy tortured and killed at the Security Prison 21) betrayed the fundamental "moral cowardice" of a man mesmerized by power but lacking any nerve.

After he left a Phnom Penh hospital where he was treated following his stroke, Samphan was arrested by the Extraordinary Chambers in the Courts of Cambodia (Khmer Rouge Tribunal) and charged with crimes against humanity and war crimes.

In April 2008, Samphan made his first appearance at the Khmer Rouge Tribunal. His lawyers, Jacques Vergès and Say Bory, used the defence that while Samphan has never denied that many people in Cambodia were killed, as head of state, he was never directly responsible for any crimes. On 7 August 2014, he and Nuon Chea received life sentences for crimes against humanity. His lawyer immediately announced the conviction would be appealed. The tribunal continued with a trial on his genocide charges as a separate process. The tribunal found him guilty on 16 November 2018 of the crime of genocide against the Vietnamese people, but he was cleared of involvement in the genocidal extermination of the Chams. The judgment also emphasised that Samphan "encouraged, incited and legitimised" the criminal policies that led to the deaths of civilians "on a massive scale" including the millions forced into labour camps to build dams and bridges and the mass extermination of Vietnamese.

On 16 August 2021, Samphan appeared before a court in Phnom Penh to appeal against his conviction, in an attempt to overturn it. The appeal was rejected on 22 September 2022, with the guilty verdicts of genocide, crimes against humanity, and grave breaches of the Geneva Convention affirmed.

He was transferred to a Cambodian prison in 2023 and will serve out his sentence there.

== Notes ==
Political offices
Preceded by Penn Nouth	Prime Minister of Democratic Kampuchea; 1976	Succeeded by Pol Pot
Preceded by Norodom Sihanouk as Head of State	Chairman of the State Presidium of Democratic Kampuchea; 1976–1979	Succeeded by Heng Samrin as Chair of the Revolutionary Council
Preceded by Pol Pot	Prime Minister of Democratic Kampuchea; 1980–1982	Succeeded by Son Sen
Preceded by Ieng Sary	Foreign Minister of Democratic Kampuchea; 1982–1991	Succeeded by None
Party political offices
Preceded by Pol Pot	General Secretary of the Party of Democratic Kampuchea; 1985–1998	Succeeded by None, party dissolved
