= Ieng Sary =

Cambodian politician and war criminal (1925–2013)

- អៀង សារី
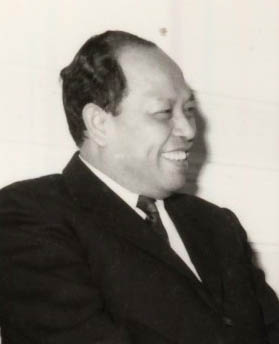
- Sary in 1978

Minister of Foreign Affairs
- In office 4 April 1976 – 7 January 1979
- Prime Minister: Pol Pot; Nuon Chea (acting)
- Preceded by: Sarin Chhak
- Succeeded by: Hun Sen

Deputy Prime Minister of Democratic Kampuchea
- In office 14 April 1976 – 7 January 1979
- Prime Minister: Pol Pot

Personal details
- Born: Kim Trang; 24 October 1925 Trà Vinh, Cochinchina, French Indochina (now Vietnam)
- Died: 14 March 2013 (aged 87) Phnom Penh, Cambodia
- Resting place: Malai District, Banteay Meanchey
- Party: Democratic National Union Movement (1996–2007); Cambodian National Unity Party (1992–1996); Party of Democratic Kampuchea (1981–1993); Communist Party of Kampuchea; French Communist Party
- Spouse: Khieu Thirith (m. 1951)
- Relations: Saloth family
- Education: Sciences Po

Ieng Sary (Khmer: អៀង សារី; born Kim Trang; 24 October 1925 – 14 March 2013) was the co-founder and a senior member of the Khmer Rouge and one of the main architects of the Cambodian genocide. He was a member of the Central Committee of the Communist Party of Kampuchea led by Pol Pot and served in the 1975–79 government of Democratic Kampuchea as foreign minister and deputy prime minister. He was known as "Brother Number Three", as he was third in command after Pol Pot and Nuon Chea. His wife, Ieng Thirith (née Khieu), served in the Khmer Rouge government as social affairs minister. Ieng Sary was arrested in 2007 and was charged with crimes against humanity but died of heart failure before the case against him could be brought to a verdict.

== Early years ==
Ieng Sary was born as Kim Trang in Nhan Hoa village, which is located in the subdistrict of Luong Hoa (known as Loeung Va in Khmer), Châu Thành District, Trà Vinh Province, southern Vietnam in 1925. His father, Kim Riem was a Khmer Krom while his mother Tran Thi Loi was both Chinese and Vietnamese mix as confirmed by the Cambodian Tribunal who moved back to Vietnam with her parents when she was a little girl. Sary changed his name from the Vietnamese Kim Trang when he joined the Khmer Rouge. He was the brother-in-law of the Khmer Rouge leader Pol Pot. Sary and Saloth Sar (Pol's birth name) studied at Phnom Penh's Lycée Sisowath where their future wives, the sisters Khieu Thirith and Khieu Ponnary also studied. Before leaving Cambodia to study in Paris, Sary was engaged to Khieu Thirith.

Sary and Pot also studied together in Paris. Whilst there, Sary rented an apartment in the Latin Quarter, a hotbed of student radicalism. He and Saloth Sar met with French communist intellectuals, and formed their own cell of Cambodian communists.

Sary and Khieu Thirith married in the town hall of Paris' 15th arrondissement in the winter of 1951. Thirith took her husband's name, becoming Ieng Thirith.

== Mid-life ==
After returning to Cambodia, he was inducted into the Central Committee of the Workers Party of Kampuchea in September 1960.

After the fall of the Khmer Republic on 17 April 1975, Sary made personal appeals to expatriates to help rebuild Cambodia. However, when they returned to Cambodia, they were arrested on arrival, and thrown into brutal detention centers. He took the nickname "Brother number 3" and, as head of diplomacy, he would be the only dignitary not to cultivate his secret identity.

He welcomed foreign visitors and was also responsible for purges and arrests in the government's ministries. At the end of 1977, before the United Nations, he rejected accusations from Cambodian refugees who wanted to open a discussion with the Khmer Rouge government. Together with Pol Pot, Ieng Sary was sentenced to death in-absentia by the People's Revolutionary Tribunal after the Democratic Khmer regime of Khmer Rouge was overthrown by Vietnam in 1979.

King Norodom Sihanouk officially pardoned Ieng Sary in 1996 after his defection from Pol Pot. He was the founder of the Democratic National Union Movement, a split from the Cambodian National Unity Party.

== Arrest and trial ==
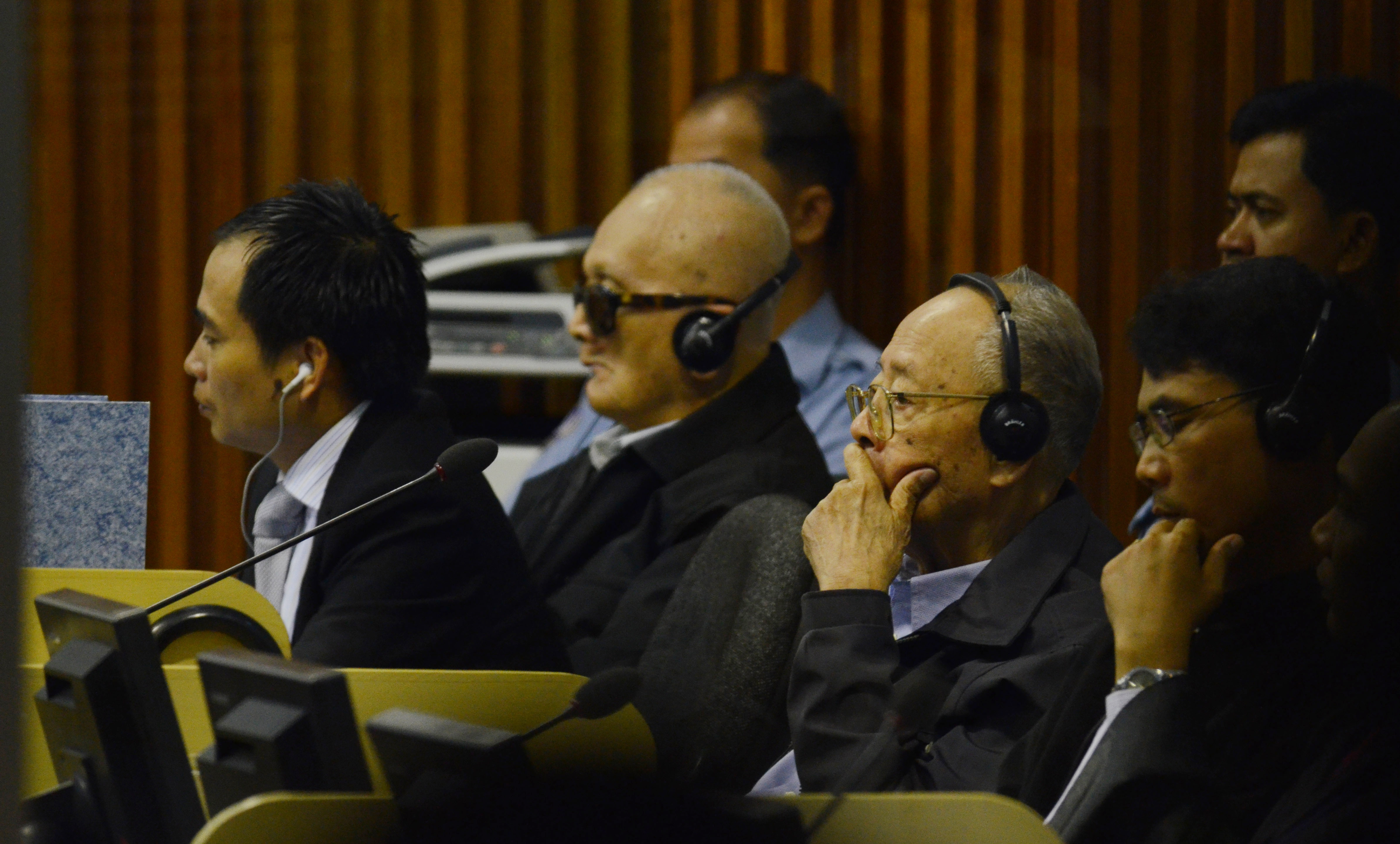
Ieng Sary with Nuon Chea on trial

Ieng Sary, reportedly living in "an opulent Phnom Penh villa surrounded by security guards and barbed wire" was arrested on 12 November 2007 in Phnom Penh on an arrest warrant from the Cambodia Tribunal for war crimes and crimes against humanity. His wife, Ieng Thirith, was also arrested for crimes against humanity.

On 16 December 2009, the tribunal officially charged him with genocide for his involvement with the subjugation and murder of Vietnamese and Muslim minorities in Cambodia.

== Death ==
Sary died in Phnom Penh on 14 March 2013 at the age of 87, before the case against him could be brought to a verdict. He had heart problems for years as well as other ailments. He was taken from his holding cell at the special tribunal to a hospital on 4 March 2013 for what his lawyers said were gastrointestinal problems. Sary's body was transported to his home in Banteay Meanchey province. The body lay for seven days before being cremated. At the time of his death, Sary was on trial for his involvement in the Khmer Rouge. Elisabeth Simonneau Fort, a lawyer for the victims, said "For the victims, this death narrows the scope of the trial and limits their search for truth and justice".

== See also ==
- Cambodian genocide
- Cambodian Civil War

Political offices
Preceded by Sarin Chhak	Minister of Foreign Affairs; 1976–1979	Succeeded by Hun Sen
