= 雲城 =

- Traditional Chinese: 雲城
- Simplified Chinese: 云城
Transcriptions
Standard Mandarin
- Hanyu Pinyin: Yúnchéng
- Bopomofo: ㄩㄣˊㄔㄥˊ
Yue: Cantonese
- Jyutping: Wan^{4}Sing^{4}
- Hong Kong Romanisation: Wan Shing

North Korean name
- Chosŏn'gŭl: 운성
- Hancha: 雲城
Transcriptions
- McCune–Reischauer: Unsŏng

雲城 may refer to:

- Wan Shing (constituency) (雲城; Wan^{4} Sing^{4}), Tai Wai, Sha Tin, New Territories, Hong Kong
- Yuncheng District (云城区; 雲城區; Yúnchéng Qū), Yunfu, Guangdong, China
- Yuncheng Subdistrict (云城; 雲城; Yúnchéng), Baiyun District, Guangzhou, Guangdong, China
- Unsong Village (운성리; 雲城里; Unsŏng-ri), Hwangju County, North Hwanghae Province, North Korea

== See also ==
- Yuncheng (disambiguation) (云城; 雲城; Yúnchéng; Wan^{4}sing^{4}), several Mandarin Chinese topics
- Unsong (disambiguation) (운성; 雲城; Unsŏng), several Korean topics
