= Sung =

Sung may refer to:

- Sung, Cambodia, commune in Samlout District, Battambang Province
- Singing (past participle of the verb "to sing")

== Chinese history ==
- Song (state) (宋) (11th century BC – 286 BC), a state during the Spring and Autumn period, also transliterated as "Sung"
- Liu Song dynasty (宋) (420–479), a dynasty during the Southern and Northern dynasties period, also transliterated as "Sung"
- Song dynasty (宋) (960–1279), a dynasty split into two eras, Northern Song and Southern Song, also transliterated as "Sung"

== Surnames ==
- Song (Chinese name)
- Seong
- Seung (Korean surname)

== See also ==
- Song (disambiguation)
- Unsung (disambiguation)
