= Samlout (commune) =

- Commune
- Location within Cambodia
- Coordinates: 12°38′01″N 102°45′14″E
- Country: Cambodia
- Province: Battambang Province
- District: Samlout District
- Villages: 6
- Time zone: UTC+07
- Geocode: 020905

Samlout is a khum (commune) of Samlout District in Battambang Province in north-western Cambodia.

It is the principal town of Samlout District.

== Villages ==
- Chhar RoKar
- Kantuot
- Ou Chrab
- Samlout
- Srae Andoung Muy
- Bueng Run
