= Unsung =

Unsung may refer to:

- Unsung or Un-Sung (Korean: 은성), an alternate spelling of the Korean given name Eun-sung
- "Unsung" (song), a song by alternative metal band Helmet
- Unsung (EP), an EP by Christian metalcore band The Chariot
- Unsung: A History of Women in American Music, a book by Christina Ammer
- Unsung (TV series), a music documentary television series
  - Unsung Hollywood, a spinoff of the Unsung music documentary TV series
- "Unsung", by Juliana Hatfield from Peace & Love
- "Unsung", a song from the Pink Floyd album The Endless River
- "Unsung", a song from the Vanessa Carlton album Be Not Nobody
- "Unsung", a song from the +/- album Xs on Your Eyes
- "Unsung" (On Call), an episode of the American TV series On Call

== See also ==
- Sung (disambiguation)
- Unsong (disambiguation)
- Unsung Heroes (disambiguation)
