= Pol Pot =

Dictator of Cambodia from 1975 to 1979

- ប៉ុល ពត
- Pol Pot in 1977

General Secretary of the Communist Party of Kampuchea
- In office 22 February 1963 – 6 December 1981
- Deputy: Nuon Chea
- Preceded by: Tou Samouth (1962)
- Succeeded by: Position abolished (party dissolved)

Prime Minister of Democratic Kampuchea
- In office 25 October 1976 – 7 January 1979; In exile: 7 January 1979 – 27 December 1979
- President: Khieu Samphan
- Deputy: Ieng Sary; Son Sen; Vorn Vet
- Preceded by: Nuon Chea (acting)
- Succeeded by: Khieu Samphan (Note: In exile); Pen Sovan (1981)
- In office 14 April 1976 – 27 September 1976
- President: Khieu Samphan
- Deputy: Ieng Sary; Son Sen; Vorn Vet
- Preceded by: Khieu Samphan (acting)
- Succeeded by: Nuon Chea (acting)

Commander-in-chief of Kampuchea Revolutionary Army
- In office 1968 or 1975 – 1979

General Secretary of the Party of Democratic Kampuchea
- In office 1981–1985
- Preceded by: Himself (as General Secretary of the Communist Party of Kampuchea)
- Succeeded by: Khieu Samphan

Personal details
- Born: Saloth Sâr; 19 May 1925 Prek Sbauv, Kampong Thom, Kingdom of Cambodia, Indochinese Union, French Republic
- Died: 15 April 1998 (aged 72) Choam Khsant District, Oddar Meanchey, Provisional Government of National Union and National Salvation of Cambodia
- Party: Party of Democratic Kampuchea (1981–1993); Communist Party of Kampuchea (1960–1981)
- Other political affiliations: French Communist Party (1950s)
- Spouses: Khieu Ponnary (m. 1956; div. 1979) Mea Son (m. 1986)
- Relations: Saloth family
- Children: Sar Patchata
- Education: EFREI (no degree)
- Nickname(s): Tol Sat (fake identity of him); Brother Number One

Military service
- Allegiance: Khmer Rouge; Democratic Kampuchea
- Branch/service: Kampuchea Revolutionary Army
- Years of service: 1963–1997
- Rank: General
- Battles/wars: Vietnam War; Cambodian Civil War; Cambodian–Vietnamese War
- Supreme Leader of Democratic Kampuchea (17 April 1975 – 27 December 1979): ← (First in role); Khieu Samphan →

Pol Pot (Note: UK: /pɒl ˈpɒt/ pol POT, US: /poʊl ˈpɒt/ pohl POT; Khmer: ប៉ុល ពត, romanized: Pŏl Pôt, pronounced [pol pɔːt].) (born Saloth Sâr; (Note: Khmer: សាឡុត ស, romanized: Salŏt Sâ, pronounced [saːlot sɑː].) 19 May 1925 – 15 April 1998) was a Cambodian politician, revolutionary, and dictator who ruled Democratic Kampuchea from 1975 until his overthrow in 1979 during the Cambodian–Vietnamese War. Ideologically a Maoist and Khmer ethnonationalist, Pot led Cambodia's Communist movement, known as the Khmer Rouge, which seized power in 1975 and established a totalitarian one-party state under the Communist Party of Kampuchea. Over the next four years, the Khmer Rouge perpetrated the Cambodian genocide, in which an estimated 1.5–2 million people died—approximately one-quarter of the country's pre-genocide population. In December 1978, Vietnam invaded Cambodia to remove the Khmer Rouge from power, ending the genocide and establishing a new Cambodian government, with the Khmer Rouge restricted to the rural hinterlands in the western part of the country. He is widely believed to be one of the most brutal despots in modern world history.

Born to a prosperous farmer in Prek Sbauv, French Cambodia, Pol Pot was educated at some of Cambodia's most elite schools. Arriving in Paris in October 1949 on an academic scholarship, he later joined the French Communist Party in 1951 while studying at the École française de radioélectricité. Returning to Cambodia in 1953, he involved himself in the Khmer Viet Minh organisation and its guerrilla war against King Norodom Sihanouk's newly independent government. Following the Khmer Viet Minh's 1954 retreat into North Vietnam, Pol Pot returned to Phnom Penh, working as a teacher while remaining a central member of Cambodia's Marxist–Leninist movement. In 1959, he helped formalise the movement into the Kampuchean Labour Party, which was later renamed the Communist Party of Kampuchea (CPK). To avoid state repression, in 1962 he relocated to a jungle encampment and in 1963 he became the CPK's leader. In 1968, he relaunched the war against Sihanouk's government. After Lon Nol ousted Sihanouk in a 1970 coup, Pol Pot's forces sided with the deposed leader against the new government, which was bolstered by the United States military. Aided by the Viet Cong militia and North Vietnamese troops, Khmer Rouge forces advanced and controlled all of Cambodia by 1975.

Pol Pot transformed Cambodia into a one-party state that he called Democratic Kampuchea, seeking to create an agrarian socialist society that he believed would evolve into a communist one. Year Zero was an idea put into practice by Pol Pot where he believed that all cultures and traditions must be completely destroyed and a new revolutionary culture must replace it starting from scratch. "Year Zero" was announced by the Khmer Rouge on April 17, 1975, where everything before that date must be purged. The Khmer Rouge emptied the cities, frogmarched Cambodians to labor camps and relocated the urban population to collective farms, where mass executions, abuse, torture, malnutrition and disease were rampant. In the Killing Fields, more than 1.3 million people were executed and buried in mass graves. Pursuing complete egalitarianism, money, religion, and private property were abolished and all citizens were forced to wear the same black clothing. Repeated purges of the CPK generated growing discontent; by 1978, Cambodian soldiers were mounting a rebellion in the east.

After several years of Khmer Rouge incursions and massacres on Vietnamese territory, Vietnam invaded Cambodia in December 1978. By January 1979, Pot and the Khmer Rouge had been toppled. The surviving Khmer Rouge members retreated to the scattered jungles near the Thai border, from where they continued to fight and raid. Severely weakened, they were hunted down by Vietnamese soldiers until their withdrawal in 1989. In declining health, Pol Pot stepped back from many of his roles in the movement. In 1998, the Khmer Rouge commander Ta Mok placed Pot under house arrest. Pol Pot died shortly afterward.

China and later the United States supported his movement as a bulwark against Soviet influence in Southeast Asia during the Sino-Soviet split. Regarded as a totalitarian dictator guilty of crimes against humanity, he has been widely denounced internationally for his role in the Cambodian genocide.

== Early life ==
=== Childhood: 1925–1941 ===
Pol Pot was born in the village of Prek Sbauv, outside the city of Kampong Thom. He was named Saloth Sâr, the word sâr ("white, pale") referencing his comparatively light skin complexion. French colonial records placed his birth date on 25 May 1928, but biographer Philip Short argues he was born in March 1925.

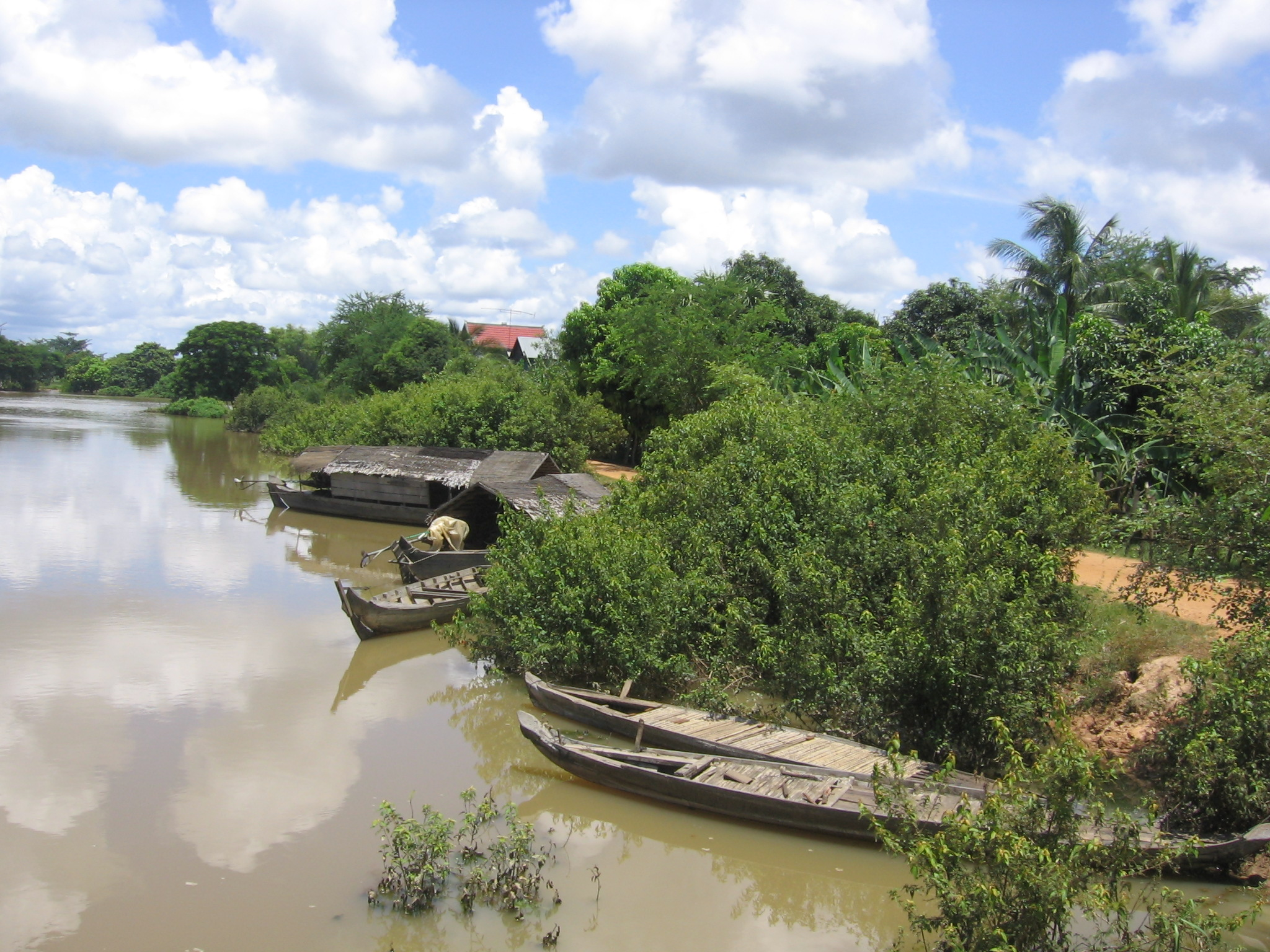
Prek Sbauv, the village where Pol Pot was born and spent his early years

His family was of mixed Chinese and ethnic Khmer heritage, but did not speak Chinese and lived as though they were fully Khmer. His father Loth, who later took the name Saloth Phem, was a prosperous farmer who owned 9 hectares (22 acres) of rice land and several draft cattle. Loth's house was one of the largest in the village and at transplanting and harvest time he hired poorer neighbours to carry out much of the agricultural labour. Sâr's mother, Sok Nem, was locally respected as a pious Buddhist. Sâr was the eighth of nine children (two girls and seven boys), three of whom died young. They were raised as Theravada Buddhists, and on festivals travelled to the Kampong Thom monastery. Despite his family's relatively prosperous origins, in an interview with Yugoslav television in 1977, Pol Pot claimed that he was born into a "poor, peasant family".

At the time, Cambodia was a monarchy but the French colonial regime held effective political control of the country. Sâr's family had connections to the Cambodian royalty: his cousin Meak was a consort of King Sisowath Monivong and later worked as a ballet teacher. When Sâr was six years old, he and an older brother were sent to live with Meak in Phnom Penh; informal adoptions by wealthier relatives were then common in Cambodia. In Phnom Penh, he spent 18 months as a novice monk in the city's Vat Botum Vaddei monastery, learning Buddhist teachings and to read and write the Khmer language.

In summer 1935, Sâr went to live with his brother Suong and the latter's wife and child. That year, he began an education at a Roman Catholic primary school, the École Miche, with Meak paying the tuition fees. Most of his classmates were the children of French bureaucrats and Catholic Vietnamese. He became literate in French and familiar with Christianity. Sâr was not academically gifted and was held back two years, receiving his Certificat d'Etudes Primaires Complémentaires in 1943 at the age of 18. He continued to visit Meak at the king's palace, and it was there that he had some of his earliest sexual experiences with some of the king's concubines.

=== Later education: 1942–1948 ===
While Sâr was at the school, King Monivong died. In 1941, the French authorities appointed Norodom Sihanouk as his replacement. A new junior middle school, the Collége Pream Sihanouk, was established in Kampong Cham, and Sâr was selected as a boarder at the institution in 1942. This level of education afforded him a privileged position in Cambodian society. He learned to play the violin and took part in school plays. Much of his spare time was spent playing football (soccer) and basketball. Several fellow pupils, among them Hu Nim and Khieu Samphan, later served in his government. During the new year vacation in 1945, Sâr and several friends from his college theatre troupe went on a provincial tour in a bus to raise money for a trip to Angkor Wat. In 1947, he left the school.

That year, he passed exams that admitted him into the Lycée Sisowath, meanwhile living with Suong and his new wife. In summer 1948, he sat the brevet entry examinations for the upper classes of the Lycée, but failed. Unlike several of his friends, he could not continue on at the school for a baccalauréat. Instead, he enrolled in 1948 to study carpentry at the Ecole Technique in Russey Keo, in Phnom Penh's northern suburbs. This drop from an academic education to a vocational one likely came as a shock. His fellow students were generally of a lower class than those at the Lycée Sisowath, though they were not peasants. At the Ecole Technique, he met Ieng Sary, who became a close friend and later a member of his government. In summer 1949, Sâr passed his brevet and secured one of five scholarships allowing him to travel to France to study at one of its engineering schools.

During the Second World War, Nazi Germany invaded France, and in 1941, the Japanese ousted the French from Cambodia, with Sihanouk proclaiming his country's independence. After the war ended, France reasserted its control over Cambodia in 1946, but allowed for the creation of a new constitution and the establishment of various political parties. The most successful of these was the Democratic Party, which won the 1946 general election. According to historian David Chandler, Sâr and Sary worked for the party during its successful election campaign; conversely, Short maintains that Sâr had no contact with the party. Sihanouk opposed the party's left-leaning reforms and in 1948 dissolved the National Assembly, instead ruling by decree. The Việt Minh attempted to establish a nascent communist movement, but it was beset by ethnic tensions between the Khmer and Vietnamese. News of the group was censored from the press, and it is unlikely Sâr was aware of it.

=== Paris: 1949–1953 ===
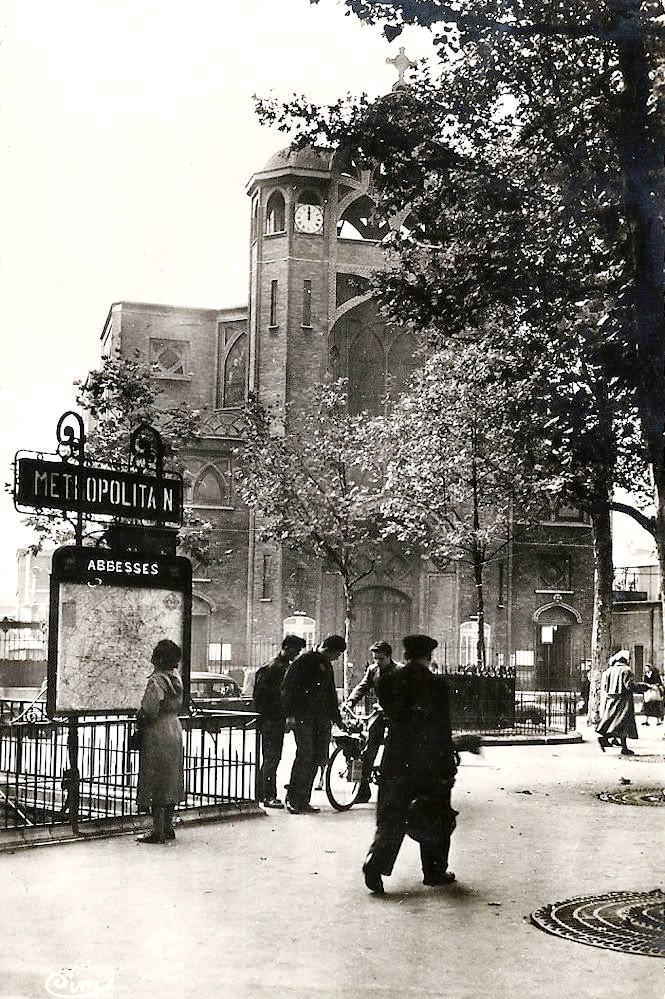
Sâr arrived in Paris on 1 October 1949. Paris pictured in 1950.

Access to further education abroad made Sâr part of a tiny elite in Cambodia. He and the 21 other selected students sailed from Saigon aboard the SS Jamaïque, stopping at Singapore, Colombo, and Djibouti en route to Marseille. Sâr arrived in Paris on 1 October 1949. In January 1950, Sâr enrolled at the École française de radioélectricité to study radio electronics. He took a room in the Cité Universitaire's Indochinese Pavilion, then lodgings on the rue Amyot, and eventually a bedsit on the corner of the rue de Commerce and the rue Letellier. Sâr earned good marks during his first year. He failed his first end-of-year exams but was allowed to retake them and narrowly passed, enabling him to continue his studies.

Sâr spent three years in Paris. In summer 1950, he was one of 18 Cambodian students who joined French counterparts in travelling to the FPR Yugoslavia to volunteer in a labour battalion building a motorway in Zagreb. He returned to Yugoslavia the following year for a camping holiday. Sâr made little or no attempt to assimilate into French culture and was never completely at ease in the French language. He nevertheless became familiar with French literature; one of his favourite authors being Jean-Jacques Rousseau. His most significant friendships in the country were with Ieng Sary, who had joined him there, Thiounn Mumm and Keng Vannsak. He was a member of Vannsak's discussion circle, whose ideologically diverse membership discussed ways to achieve Cambodian independence.

In Paris, Ieng Sary and two others established the Cercle Marxiste ("Marxist Circle"), an organisation arranged in a clandestine cell system. The cells met to read Marxist texts and hold self-criticism sessions. Sâr joined a cell that met on the rue Lacepède; his cell comrades included Hou Yuon, Sien Ary, and Sok Knaol. He helped to duplicate the Cercle's newspaper, Reaksmei ("The Spark"), named after a former Russian paper. In October 1951, Yuon was elected head of the Khmer Student Association (AEK; l'Association des Etudiants Khmers), establishing close links between the organisation and the leftist Union Nationale des Étudiants de France. The Cercle Marxiste manipulated the AEK and its successor organisations for the next 19 years. Several months after the Cercle Marxiste's formation, Sâr and Sary joined the French Communist Party (PCF). Sâr attended party meetings, including those of its Cambodian group, and read its magazine, Les Cahiers Internationaux. To many young people in France and Cambodia, communism seemed to be the future; the Chinese Communist Party won the Chinese Civil War and the French Communist Party was one of the country's largest, attracting the votes of around 25% of the French electorate.

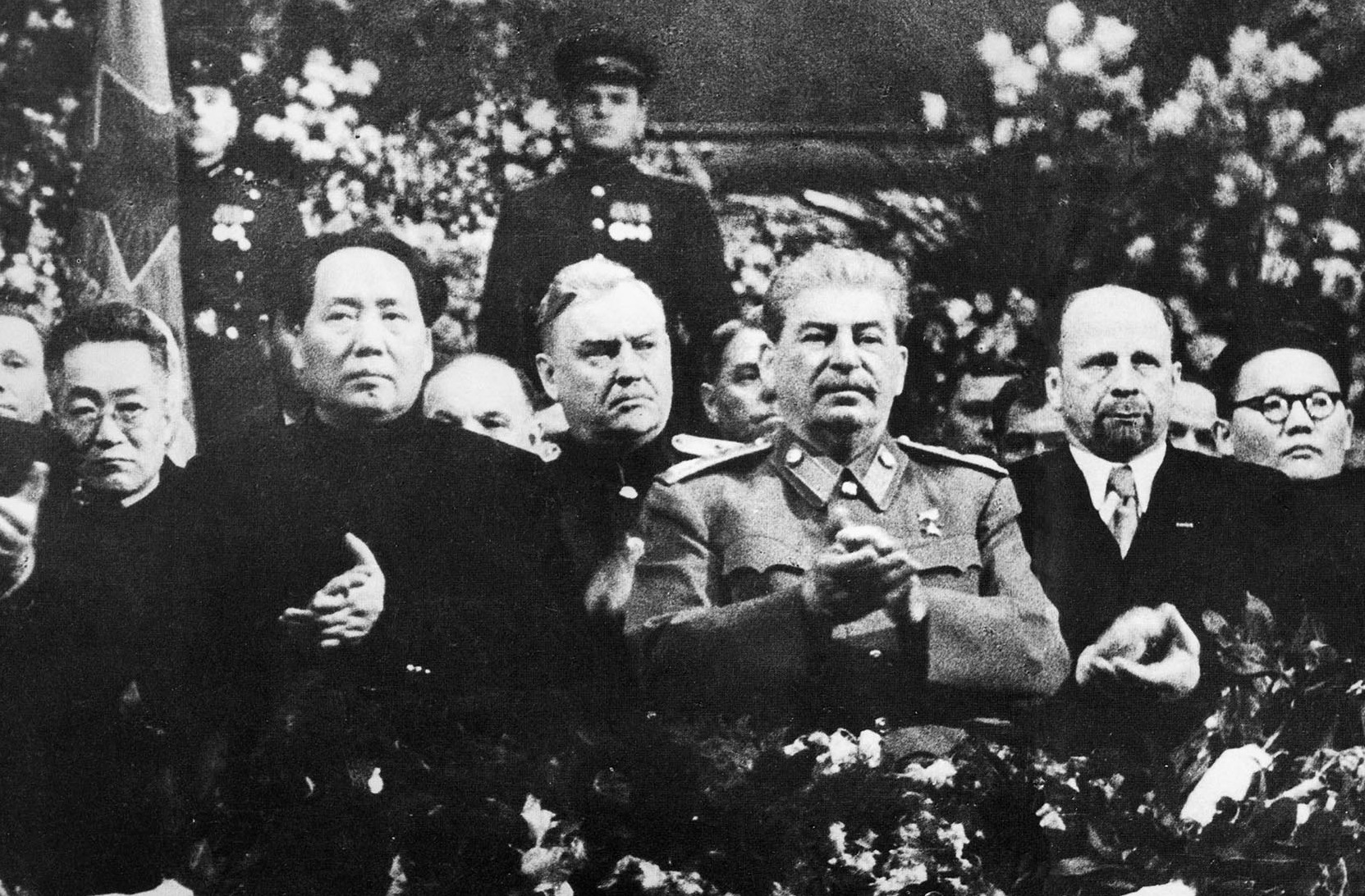
In Paris, Pol Pot was inspired by the writings of Mao Zedong and Joseph Stalin (pictured together in 1949) on how to conduct a revolution.

Sâr found many of Karl Marx's denser texts difficult, later saying he "didn't really understand" them. But he became familiar with the writings of Soviet leader Joseph Stalin, including The History of the Communist Party of the Soviet Union (Bolsheviks). Sâr also read Mao's work, especially On New Democracy, a text outlining a framework for carrying out a revolution in colonial and semi-colonial, semi-feudal societies. Alongside these texts, Sâr read the anarchist Peter Kropotkin's book on the French Revolution, The Great Revolution. From Kropotkin he took the idea that an alliance between intellectuals and the peasantry was necessary for revolution; that a revolution had to be carried out without compromise to its conclusion to succeed; and that egalitarianism was the basis of a communist society.

In Cambodia, growing internal strife resulted in King Sihanouk dismissing the government and declaring himself prime minister. In response, Sâr wrote an article, "Monarchy or Democracy?", published in the student magazine Khmer Nisut under the pseudonym "Khmer daom" ("Original Khmer"). In it, he referred positively to Buddhism, portraying Buddhist monks as an anti-monarchist force on the side of the peasantry. At a meeting, the Cercle decided to send someone to Cambodia to assess the situation and determine which rebel group they should support; Sâr volunteered for the role. His decision to leave may also have been because he had failed his second-year exams two years in a row and thus lost his scholarship. In December, he boarded the SS Jamaïque, returning to Cambodia without a degree.

== Revolutionary and political activism ==
=== Return to Cambodia: 1953–1954 ===
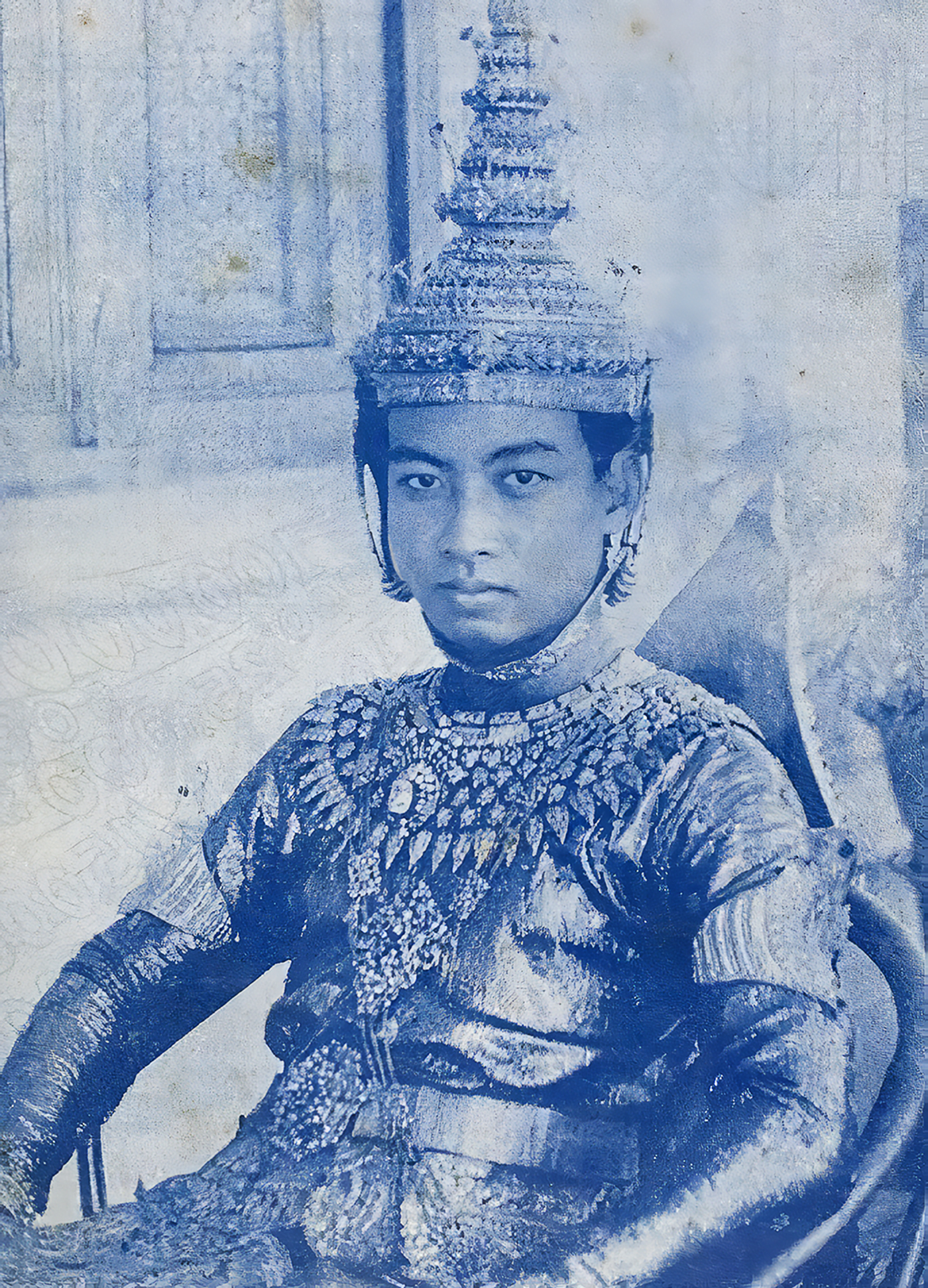
King Sihanouk disbanded the Cambodian government and National Assembly before securing independence from French colonial rule in 1953.

Sâr arrived in Saigon (the future Ho Chi Minh City) on 13 January 1953, the same day on which Sihanouk disbanded the Democratic-controlled National Assembly, began ruling by decree, and imprisoned Democratic members of parliament without trial. Amid the broader First Indochina War in neighbouring French Indochina, Cambodia was in a civil war, with civilian massacres and other atrocities carried out by all sides. Sâr spent several months at the headquarters of Prince Norodom Chantaraingsey—the leader of one faction—in Trapeng Kroloeung, before moving to Phnom Penh, where he met with fellow Cercle member Ping Say to discuss the situation. Sâr regarded the Khmer Việt Minh, a mixed Vietnamese and Cambodian guerrilla subgroup of the North Vietnam-based Việt Minh, as the most promising resistance group. He believed the Khmer Việt Minh's relationship to the Việt Minh and thus the international movement made it the best group for the Cercle Marxiste to support. The Cercle members in Paris took his recommendation.

In August 1953, Sâr and Rath Samoeun travelled to Krabao, the headquarters of the Việt Minh Eastern Zone. Over the following nine months, around 12 other Cercle members joined them there. They found that the Khmer Việt Minh was run and numerically dominated by Vietnamese guerrillas, with Khmer recruits largely given menial tasks; Sâr was tasked with growing cassava and working in the canteen. At Krabao, he gained a rudimentary grasp of Vietnamese, and rose to become secretary and aide to Tou Samouth, the Secretary of the Khmer Việt Minh's Eastern Zone.

Sihanouk desired independence from French rule, but after France refused his requests he called for public resistance to its administration in June 1953. Khmer troops deserted the French Army in large numbers and the French government relented, rather than risk a costly, protracted war to retain control. In November, Sihanouk declared Cambodia's independence. The civil conflict then intensified, with France backing Sihanouk's war against the rebels. Following the Geneva Conference held to end the First Indochina War, Sihanouk secured an agreement from the North Vietnamese that they would withdraw Khmer Việt Minh forces from Cambodian territory. The last Khmer Việt Minh units left Cambodia for North Vietnam in October 1954. Sâr was not among them, deciding to remain in Cambodia; he trekked, via South Vietnam, to Prey Veng to reach Phnom Penh. He and other Cambodian revolutionaries decided to pursue their aims through electoral means.

=== Developing the movement: 1955–1959 ===
Cambodia's communists wanted to operate clandestinely but also established a socialist party, Pracheachon, to serve as a front organization through which they could compete in the 1955 election. Although Pracheachon had strong support in some areas, most observers expected the Democratic Party to win. Sihanouk feared a Democratic Party government and in March 1955 abdicated the throne in favour of his father, Norodom Suramarit. This allowed him to legally establish a political party, the Sangkum Reastr Niyum, with which to contest the election. The September election witnessed widespread voter intimidation and electoral fraud, resulting in Sangkum winning all 91 seats. Sihanouk's establishment of a de facto one-party state extinguished hopes that the Cambodian left could take power electorally. North Vietnam's government nevertheless urged the Khmer Party not to restart the armed struggle; the former was focused on undermining South Vietnam and had little desire to destabilize Sihanouk's regime given that it had—conveniently for them—remained internationally un-aligned rather than following the Thai and South Vietnamese governments in allying with the anti-communist United States.

Sâr rented a house in the Boeng Keng Kang area of Phnom Penh. Although not qualified to teach at a state school, he gained employment teaching history, geography, French literature, and morals at a private school, the Chamraon Vichea ("Progressive Knowledge"); his pupils, who included the later novelist Soth Polin, described him as a good teacher. He courted society belle Soeung Son Maly before entering a relationship with fellow communist revolutionary Khieu Ponnary, the sister of Sary's wife Thirith. They were married in a Buddhist ceremony on 14 July 1956. According to Philip Short, Sâr had chosen this date in order to coincide with the symbolic Bastille Day. All correspondence between the Democratic Party and the Pracheachon went through him, as did most communication with underground elements. Sihanouk cracked down on the movement, whose membership had diminished by half since the end of the civil war. Links with the North Vietnamese communists declined, something Sâr later portrayed as a good thing as "it gave us the chance to be independent and develop ourselves". He and other members increasingly regarded Cambodians as too deferential to their Vietnamese counterparts; to deal with this, Sâr, Tou Samouth, and Nuon Chea drafted a programme and statutes for a new party that would be allied with but not subordinate to the Vietnamese. They established party cells, emphasising the recruitment of small numbers of dedicated members, and organized political seminars in safe houses.

=== Kampuchean Labour Party: 1959–1962 ===
At a 1959 conference, the movement's leadership established the Kampuchean Labour Party, based on the Marxist–Leninist model of democratic centralism. Sâr, Tou Samouth and Nuon Chea were part of a four-man General Affair Committee leading the party. Its existence was to be kept secret from non-members. The Kampuchean Labour Party's conference, held clandestinely from September to October 1960 in Phnom Penh, saw Samouth become party secretary and Nuon Chea his deputy, while Sâr took the third senior position and Ieng Sary the fourth.

Sihanouk spoke out against the Cambodian Khmer communists; he also warned of its totalitarian character and its suppression of personal liberty. In January 1962, Sihanouk's security services cracked down further on Cambodia's socialists, incarcerating Pracheachon's leaders and leaving the party largely moribund. In July, Samouth was arrested, tortured and killed. Nuon Chea had also stepped back from his political activities, leaving open Sâr's path to become party leader.

As well as facing leftist opposition, Sihanouk's government faced hostility from right-wing opposition centred on Sihanouk's former Minister of State, Sam Sary, who was backed by the United States, Thailand and South Vietnam. After the South Vietnamese supported a failed coup against Sihanouk, relations between the countries deteriorated and the United States initiated an economic blockade of Cambodia in 1956. After Sihanouk's father died in 1960, Sihanouk introduced a constitutional amendment allowing himself to become head of state for life. In February 1962, anti-government student protests turned into riots, at which Sihanouk dismissed the Sangkum government, called new elections, and produced a list of 34 left-leaning Cambodians, demanding that they meet him to establish a new administration. Sâr was on the list, perhaps because of his role as a teacher, but refused to meet with Sihanouk. He and Ieng Sary left Phnom Penh for a Viet Cong encampment near Thboung Khmum in the jungle along Cambodia's border with South Vietnam. According to Chandler, "from this point on he was a full-time revolutionary".

=== Plotting rebellion: 1962–1968 ===
Conditions at the Viet Cong camp were basic and food scarce. As Sihanouk's government cracked down on the movement in Phnom Penh, growing numbers of its members fled to join Sâr at his jungle base. In February 1963, at the party's second conference, held in a central Phnom Penh apartment, Sâr was elected party secretary, but soon fled into the jungle to avoid repression by Sihanouk's government. In early 1964, Sâr established his own encampment, Office 100, on the South Vietnamese side of the border. The Viet Cong allowed his actions to be officially separate from its own, but still wielded significant control over his camp. At a plenum of the party's Central Committee, it was agreed that they should re-emphasize their independence from Vietnamese control and endorse armed struggle against Sihanouk.

The Central Committee met again in January 1965 to denounce the "peaceful transition" to socialism espoused by Soviet Premier Nikita Khrushchev, accusing him of being a revisionist. In contrast to Khrushchev's interpretation of Marxism–Leninism, Sâr and his comrades sought to develop their own, explicitly Cambodian variant of the ideology. Their interpretation moved away from the orthodox Marxist focus on the urban proletariat as the forces of a revolution to build socialism, giving that role instead to the rural peasantry, a far larger class in Cambodian society. By 1965, the party regarded Cambodia's small proletariat as full of "enemy agents" and systematically refused them membership. The party's main area of growth was in the rural provinces and by 1965 membership was at 2000. In April 1965, Sâr travelled by foot along the Ho Chi Minh trail to Hanoi to meet North Vietnamese government figures, among them Ho Chi Minh and Lê Duẩn. The North Vietnamese were preoccupied with the ongoing Vietnam War and thus did not want Sâr's forces to destabilize Sihanouk's government; the latter's anti-American stance rendered him a de facto ally. In Hanoi, Sâr read through the archives of the Workers' Party of Vietnam, concluding that the Vietnamese Communists were committed to pursuing an Indochinese Federation and that their interests were therefore incompatible with Cambodia's.

In November 1965, Saloth Sâr flew from Hanoi to Beijing, where his official host was Deng Xiaoping, although most of his meetings were with Peng Zhen. Sâr gained a sympathetic hearing from many in the governing Chinese Communist Party (CCP)—especially Chen Boda, Zhang Chunqiao and Kang Sheng—who shared his negative view of Khrushchev amid the Sino-Soviet split. CCP officials also trained him on topics like dictatorship of the proletariat, class struggles and political purge. In Beijing, Sâr witnessed China's ongoing Cultural Revolution, influencing his later policies.

The flag of the Communist Party of Kampuchea, a group whose members were informally known as the "Khmer Rouge"

Sâr left Beijing in February 1966, and flew back to Hanoi before a four-month journey along the Ho Chi Minh trail to reach the Cambodian's new base at Loc Ninh. In October 1966, he and other Cambodian party leaders made several key decisions. They renamed their organisation the Communist Party of Kampuchea (CPK), a decision initially kept secret. Sihanouk began referring to its members as the "Khmer Rouge" ('Red Cambodians'), but they did not adopt this term themselves. It was agreed that they would move their headquarters in Ratanakiri Province, away from the Viet Cong, and that—despite the views of the North Vietnamese—they would command each of the party's zone committees to prepare for the relaunch of armed struggle. North Vietnam refused to assist in this, rejecting their requests for weaponry. In November 1967, Sâr travelled from Tay Ninh to base Office 102 near Kang Lêng. During the journey, he contracted malaria and required a respite in a Viet Cong medical base near Mount Ngork. By December, plans for armed conflict were complete, with the war to begin in the North-West Zone and then spread to other regions. As communication across Cambodia was slow, each Zone would have to operate independently much of the time.

== Cambodian Civil War ==
=== Against Sihanouk ===
In January 1968, the war was launched with an attack on the Bay Damran army post south of Battambang. Further attacks targeted police and soldiers and seized weaponry. The government responded with scorched-earth policies, aerially bombarding areas where rebels were active. The army's brutality aided the insurgents' cause; as the uprising spread, over 100,000 villagers joined them. In the summer, Sâr relocated his base 48 kilometres (30 mi) north to the more mountainous Naga's Tail, to avoid encroaching government troops. At this base, called K-5, he increased his dominance over the party and had his own separate encampment, staff, and guards. No outsider was allowed to meet him without an escort. He took over from Sary as the Secretary of the North East Zone. In November 1969, Sâr trekked to Hanoi to persuade the North Vietnamese government to provide direct military assistance. They refused, urging him to revert to a political struggle. In January 1970 he flew to Beijing. There, his wife began showing early signs of the chronic paranoid schizophrenia she would later be diagnosed with.

=== Against Lon Nol ===
==== Collaboration with Sihanouk: 1970–1971 ====
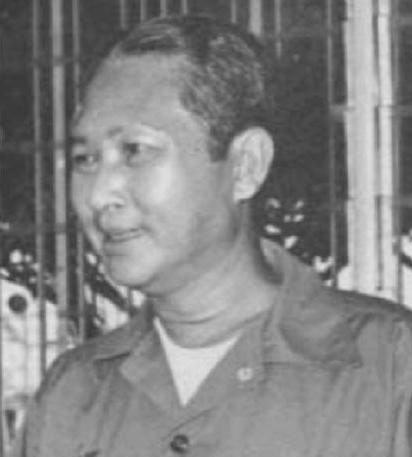
In 1970, a U.S. backed coup led to Lon Nol's right-wing dictatorship being installed in Cambodia.

In March 1970, while Sâr was in Beijing, Cambodian parliamentarians led by Lon Nol deposed Sihanouk when he was out of the country. Sihanouk also flew to Beijing, where the Chinese and North Vietnamese Communist Parties urged him to form an alliance with the Khmer Rouge to overthrow Lon Nol's right-wing government. Sihanouk agreed. On Zhou Enlai's advice, Sâr also agreed, although his dominant role in the CPK was concealed from Sihanouk. Sihanouk then formed his own government-in-exile in Beijing and launched the National United Front of Kampuchea to rally Lon Nol's opponents. Sihanouk's support for the Khmer Rouge helped greatly in recruitment, with Khmer Rouge undergoing a massive expansion in size. Many of the new recruits for the Khmer Rouge were apolitical peasants who fought in support of the King, not for communism, of which they had little understanding.

In April 1970, Sâr flew to Hanoi, Vietnam. He stressed to General Secretary Lê Duẩn that while he wanted the Vietnamese to supply the Khmer Rouge with weapons, he did not want troops: the Cambodians needed to oust Lon Nol and his military government themselves. North Vietnamese armies, in collaboration with the Viet Cong, nevertheless invaded Cambodia to attack Lon Nol's forces; in turn, South Vietnam and the United States sent troops to the country to bolster his government. This pulled Cambodia into the Second Indochina War already raging across Vietnam. The U.S. dropped three times as many bombs on Cambodia during the conflict as they had on Japan during World War II. Although targeting Viet Cong and Khmer Rouge encampments, the bombing primarily affected civilians. This helped fuel recruitment to the Khmer Rouge, which had an estimated 12,000 regular soldiers at the end of 1970 and four times that number by 1972.

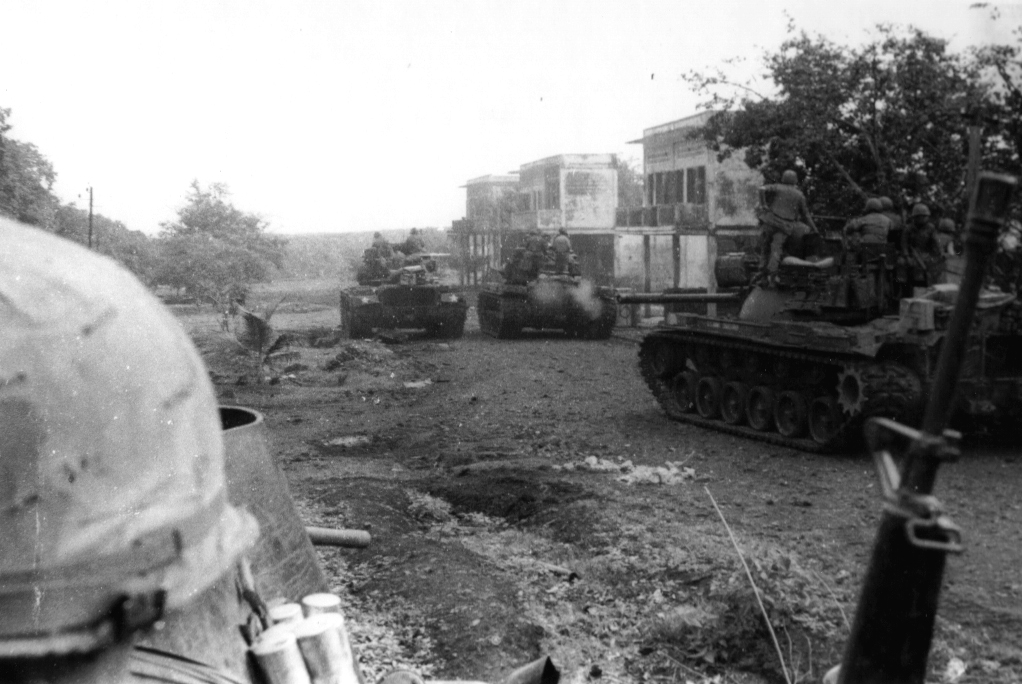
After Vietnamese forces invaded Cambodia to overthrow Lon Nol's government, the U.S. (forces pictured) sent in its military to support his administration.

In June 1970, Sâr left Vietnam and reached his K-5 base. In July he headed south; it was at this point that he began referring to himself as "Pol", a name he later lengthened to "Pol Pot". By September, he was based at a camp on the border of Kratie and Kompong Thom, where he convened a meeting of the CPK Standing Committee. Although few senior members could attend, it issued a resolution setting out the principle of "independence-mastery", the idea that Cambodia must be self-reliant and fully independent of other countries. In November, Pol Pot, Ponnary, and their entourage relocated to the K-1 base at Dângkda. His residence was set up on the northern side of the Chinit river; entry was strictly controlled. By the end of the year, Marxist forces had a presence in over half of Cambodia; the Khmer Rouge played a restricted role in this, for throughout 1971 and 1972, the majority of fighting against Lon Nol was carried out by Vietnamese or by Cambodians under Vietnamese control.

In January 1971, a Central Committee meeting was held at the K-1 base, bringing together 27 delegates to discuss the war. During 1971, Pol Pot and the other senior party members focused on the construction of a regular Khmer Rouge army and administration that could take a central role when the Vietnamese withdrew. Membership of the party was made more selective, permitting only those regarded as "poor peasants", not those seen as "middle peasants" or students. In July and August, Pol Pot oversaw a month-long training course for CPK cadres in the Northern Zone headquarters. This was followed by the CPK's Third Congress, attended by around 60 delegates, where Pol Pot was confirmed as the Secretary of the Central Committee and Chairman of its Military Commission.

=== Continuing the conflict: 1972 ===
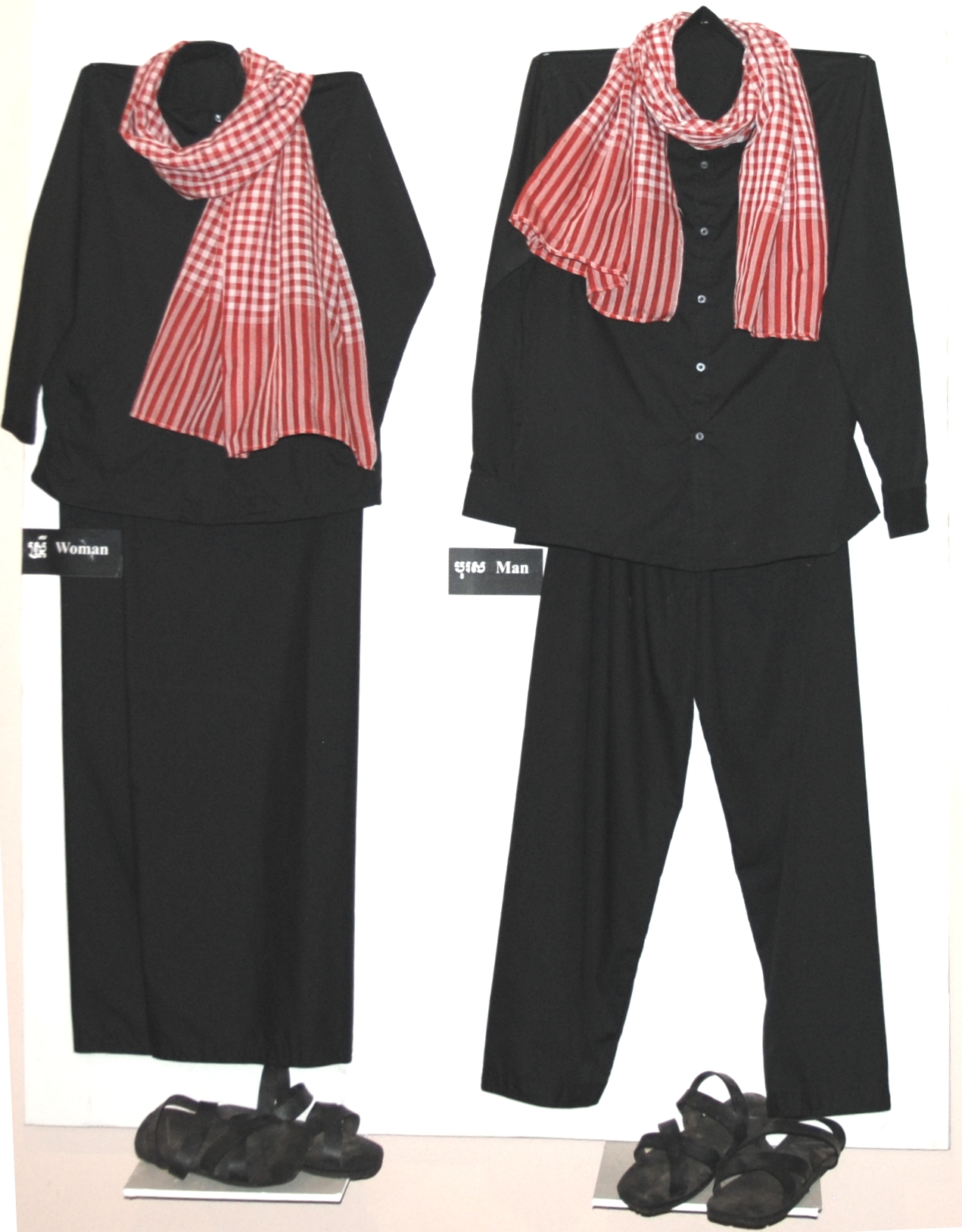
Uniforms worn by the Khmer Rouge during their period of control

In early 1972, Pol Pot embarked on his first tour of the Marxist-controlled areas across Cambodia. In these areas, called "liberated zones", corruption was stamped out, gambling was banned, and alcohol and extramarital affairs were discouraged. From 1970 to 1971, the Khmer Rouge had generally sought to cultivate good relations with the inhabitants, organising local elections and assemblies. Some people regarded as hostile to the movement were executed, although this was uncommon. Private motor transport was requisitioned. Wealthier peasants had their land redistributed so that by the end of 1972, all families living in the Marxist-controlled areas possessed an equal amount of land. The poorest strata of Cambodian society benefited from these reforms.

From 1972, the Khmer Rouge began trying to refashion all of Cambodia in the image of the poor peasantry, whose rural, isolated, and self-sufficient lives were regarded as worthy of emulation. As of May 1972, the group began ordering all of those living under its control to dress like poor peasants, with black clothes, red-and-white krama scarves, and sandals made from car tyres. These restrictions were initially imposed on the Cham ethnic group before being rolled out across other communities. Pol Pot also dressed in this fashion.

CPK members were expected to attend regular (sometimes daily) "lifestyle meetings" in which they engaged in criticism and self-criticism. These cultivated an atmosphere of perpetual vigilance and suspicion within the movement. Pol Pot and Nuon Chea led such sessions at their headquarters, although they were exempt from criticism themselves. By early 1972, relations between the Khmer Rouge and its Vietnamese Marxist allies were becoming strained and some violent clashes had broken out. That year, the North Vietnamese and Viet Cong main-force divisions began pulling out of Cambodia primarily for the offensive against Saigon. As it became more dominant, the CPK imposed increasing numbers of controls over Vietnamese troops active in Cambodia. In 1972, Pol Pot suggested that Sihanouk leave Beijing and tour the areas of Cambodia under CPK control. When Sihanouk did so, he met with senior CPK figures, including Pol Pot, although the latter's identity was concealed from the king.

=== Collectivisation and the conquest of Phnom Penh: 1973–1975 ===
In May 1973, Pol Pot ordered the collectivisation of villages in territory that the Khmer Rouge controlled. This move was both ideological, in that it built a socialist society void of private property, and tactical, in that it allowed the Khmer Rouge greater control over the food supply, ensuring that farmers did not provision government forces. Many villagers resented the collectivisation and slaughtered their livestock to prevent it from becoming collective property. Over the following six months, about 60,000 Cambodians fled from areas under Khmer Rouge control. The Khmer Rouge introduced conscription to bolster its forces. Relations between the Khmer Rouge and the North Vietnamese remained strained. After the latter temporarily reduced the flow of arms to the Khmer Rouge, in July 1973 the CPK Central Committee agreed that the North Vietnamese should be considered "a friend with a conflict". Pol Pot ordered the internment of many of the Khmer Rouge who had spent time in North Vietnam and were considered too sympathetic to them. Most of these people were later executed.

In summer 1973, the Khmer Rouge launched its first major assault on Phnom Penh, but was forced back amid heavy losses. Later that year, it began bombarding the city with artillery. In the autumn, Pol Pot travelled to a base at Chrok Sdêch on the eastern foothills of the Cardamom Mountains. By winter, he was back at the Chinit Riber base where he conferred with Sary and Chea. He concluded that the Khmer Rouge should start talking openly about its commitment to making Cambodia a socialist society and launch a secret campaign to oppose Sihanouk's influence. In September 1974, a Central Committee meeting was held at Meakk in Prek Kok commune. There the Khmer Rouge agreed that it would expel the populations of Cambodia's cities to rural villages. They thought this was necessary to dismantle capitalism which they associated with the urban culture.

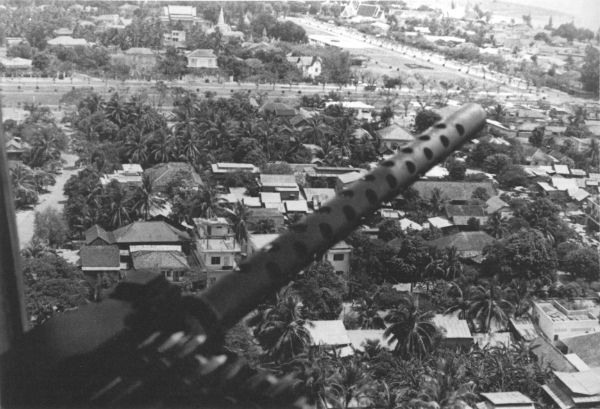
View of Phnom Penh from a U.S. helicopter, 12 April 1975

By 1974, Lon Nol's government had lost a great deal of support, both domestically and internationally. In 1975, the troops defending Phnom Penh began discussing surrender, eventually doing so and allowing the Khmer Rouge to enter the city on 17 April. There, Khmer Rouge soldiers executed between 700 and 800 senior government, military, and police figures. Other senior figures escaped; Lon Nol fled into exile in the US. He left Saukham Khoy as acting president, although he too fled aboard a departing U.S. Navy ship just twelve days later. Within the city, Khmer Rouge militia under the control of different Zone commanders clashed with one another, partly as a result of turf wars and partly due to the difficulty of establishing who was a group member and who was not.

The Khmer Rouge had long viewed Phnom Penh's population with mistrust, particularly as the city's numbers had been swelled by peasant refugees who had fled the Khmer Rouge's advance and were considered to be traitors. Shortly after taking the city, the Khmer Rouge announced that its inhabitants had to evacuate to escape a forthcoming U.S. bombing raid; the group falsely claimed that the population would be allowed to return after three days. This evacuation entailed moving over 2.5 million people out of the city with very little preparation; between 15,000 and 20,000 of these were removed from the city's hospitals and forced to march. Checkpoints were erected along the roads out of the city where Khmer Rouge cadres searched marchers and removed many of their belongings. The march took place in the hottest month of the year and an estimated 20,000 people died along the route. For the Khmer Rouge, emptying Phnom Penh was considered as demolishing not just capitalism in Cambodia, but also Sihanouk's power base and the spy network of the U.S. Central Intelligence Agency (CIA). This dismantling facilitated Khmer Rouge dominance over the country and enabled driving the urban population toward agricultural production.

== Leader of Democratic Kampuchea ==
=== Establishing the new government: 1975 ===
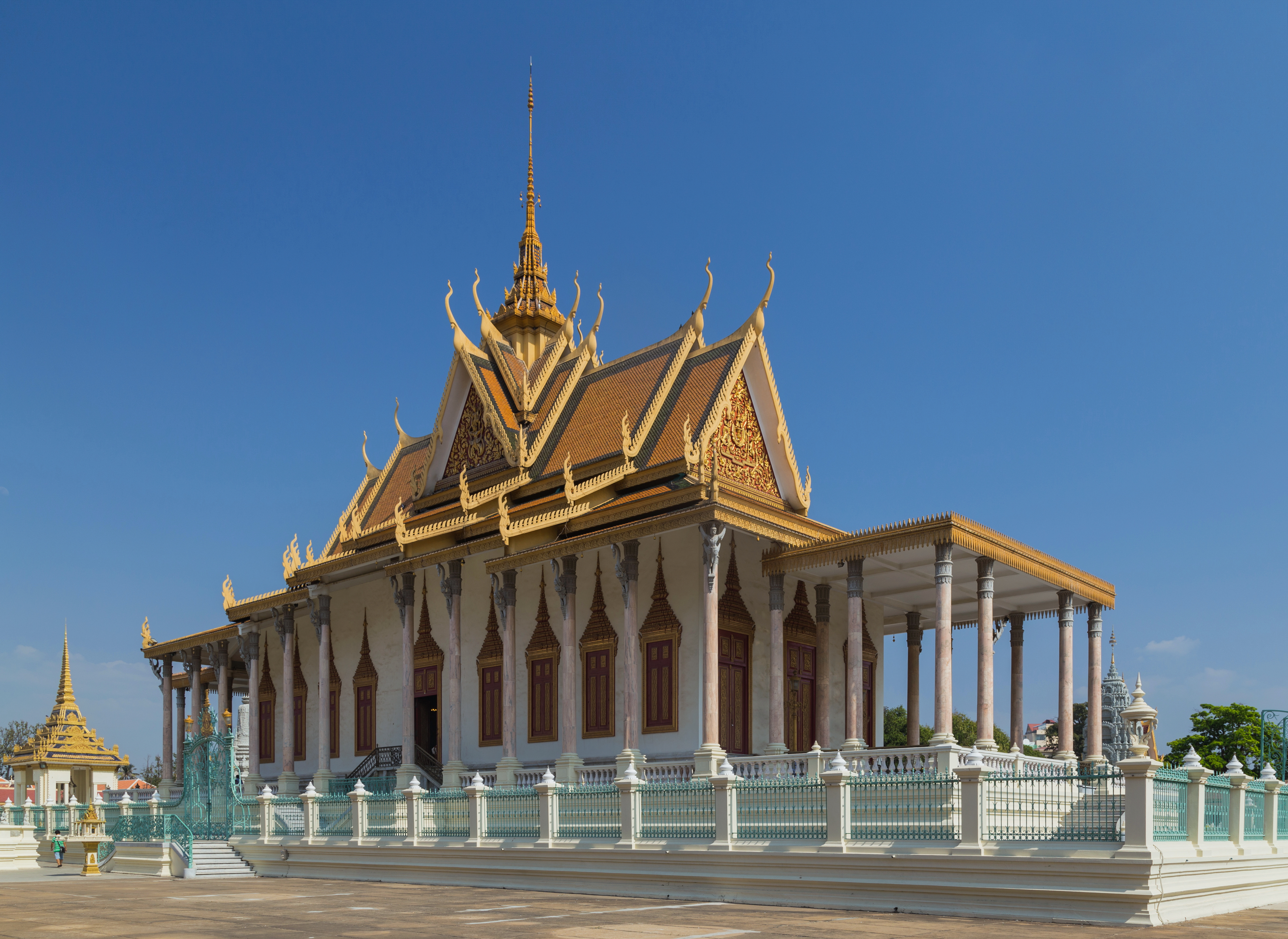
Pol Pot's government held its early meetings in the Silver Pagoda, which later served as Pol Pot's home.

On 20 April 1975, three days after Phnom Penh fell, Pol Pot secretly arrived in the abandoned city. Along with other Khmer Rouge leaders, he based himself in the railway station, which was easy to defend. In early May, they moved their headquarters to the former Finance Ministry building. The party leadership soon held a meeting at the Silver Pagoda, where they agreed that raising agricultural production should be their government's top priority. Pol Pot declared that "agriculture is key both to nation-building and to national defence"; he believed that unless Cambodia could develop swiftly then it would be vulnerable to Vietnamese domination, as it had been in the past. Their goal was to reach 70 to 80% farm mechanisation in five to ten years, and a modern industrial base in fifteen to twenty years. As part of this project, Pol Pot saw it as imperative that they develop means of ensuring that the farming population worked harder than before.

The autarkic Khmer Rouge wanted to establish Cambodia as a self-sufficient, agricultural state. They did not reject foreign assistance altogether, although they regarded it as pernicious. While China supplied them with substantial food aid, this was not publicly acknowledged. Shortly after the taking of Phnom Penh, Ieng Sary travelled to Beijing, negotiating the provision of 13,300 tons of Chinese weaponry to Cambodia. At the National Congress meeting in April, the Khmer Rouge declared that it would not permit any foreign military bases on Cambodian soil, a threat to Vietnam, which still had 20,000 troops in Cambodia. To quell tensions arising from recent territorial clashes with Vietnamese soldiers over the disputed Wai Island, Pol Pot, Nuon Chea, and Ieng Sary travelled secretly to Hanoi in May, where they proposed a Friendship Treaty between the two countries. In the short term, this successfully eased tensions. After Hanoi, Pol Pot proceeded to Beijing, again in secret. There he met with Mao and then Deng. Although communication with Mao was hindered by the reliance on translators, Mao warned the younger Cambodian against uncritically imitating the path to socialism pursued by China or any other country, and advised him to avoid repeating the drastic measures that the Khmer Rouge had imposed before. In China, Pol Pot also received medical treatment for his malaria and gastric ailments. Pol Pot then travelled to North Korea, meeting with Kim Il Sung. In mid-July he returned to Cambodia, and spent August touring the South-Western and Eastern Zones.

You have a lot of experience. It's better than ours. We don't have the right to criticise you ... Basically you are right. Have you made mistakes or not? I don't know. Certainly you have. So rectify yourselves; do rectification! ... The road is tortuous.

— Mao's advice to Pol Pot, 1975

Pol Pot's wife, whose schizophrenia had worsened, was sent to live in a house in Boeung Keng Kâng. Later in 1975, Pol Pot also took Ponnary's old family home in the rue Docteur Hahn as a residence, and subsequently also took a villa in the south of the city for his own. To give his government a greater appearance of legitimacy, Pol Pot organised a parliamentary election, although there was only one candidate in every constituency except in Phnom Penh. The parliament then met for only three hours.

Although Pol Pot and the Khmer Rouge remained the de facto government, initially the formal government was the GRUNK coalition, although its nominal head, Penn Nouth, remained in Beijing. Throughout 1975, the Communist Party's control over Cambodia was kept secret. At a special National Congress meeting from 25 to 27 April, the Khmer Rouge agreed to make Sihanouk the nominal head of state, a status he retained throughout 1975. Sihanouk had been dividing his time between Beijing and Pyongyang but in September was allowed to return to Cambodia. Pol Pot was aware that if left abroad, Sihanouk could become a rallying point for opposition and thus was better brought into the Khmer government itself; he also hoped to take advantage of Sihanouk's stature in the Non-Aligned Movement. Once home, Sihanouk settled into his palace and was well treated. Sihanouk was allowed to travel abroad, in October addressing the UN General Assembly to promote the new Cambodian government and in November embarking on an international tour.

The Khmer Rouge's military forces remained divided into differing zones and at a July military parade, Pol Pot announced the formal integration of all troops into a national Revolutionary Army, to be headed by Son Sen. Although a new Cambodian currency had been printed in China during the civil war, the Khmer Rouge decided not to introduce it. At the Central Committee Plenum held in Phnom Penh in September, they agreed that currency would lead to corruption and undermine their efforts to establish a socialist society. Thus, there were no wages in Democratic Kampuchea. The population were expected to do whatever the Khmer Rouge commanded of them, without pay. If they refused, they faced punishment, sometimes execution. For this reason, Short characterised Pol Pot's Cambodia as a "slave state", with its people effectively forced into slavery by working without pay. At the September Plenum, Pol Pot announced that all farmers were expected to meet a quota of three tons of paddy, or unmilled rice, per hectare, an increase on what was previously the average yield. There he also announced that manufacturing should focus on the production of basic agricultural machinery and light industrial goods such as bicycles.

==== Rural reform ====
From 1975 onward, all of those Cambodians who were living in rural co-operatives, meaning the vast majority of Cambodia's population, were reclassified as members of one of three groups: the full-rights members, the candidates, and the depositees. The full-rights members, most of whom were poor or lower-middle peasants, were entitled to full rations, and able to hold political posts in the co-operatives and join both the army and the Communist Party. Candidates could still hold low-level administrative positions. The application of this tripartite system was uneven and it was introduced to different areas at different times. On the ground, the basic societal division remained between the "base" people and the "new" people. It was never Pol Pot and the party's intention to exterminate all "new" people although the latter were usually treated harshly and this led some commentators to believe extermination was the government's desire. Pol Pot instead wanted to double or triple the country's population, hoping it could reach between 15 and 20 million within a decade.

Within the village co-operatives, Khmer Rouge militia regularly killed those Cambodians who they deemed to be "bad elements". A common statement used by the Khmer Rouge to those they executed was that "to keep you is no profit, to destroy you is no loss." Those killed were often buried by the fields, to act as fertiliser. During the first year of Khmer Rouge rule, most areas of the country were able to stave off starvation despite significant population increases caused by the evacuation of the cities. There were exceptions, such as parts of the North-West Zone and western areas of Kompong Chhnang, where starvation did occur in 1975.

The new Standing Committee decreed that the population would work ten day weeks with one day off from labour; a system modelled on that used after the French Revolution. Measures were taken to indoctrinate those living in the co-operatives, with set phrases about hard work and loving Cambodia being widely employed, for instance broadcast via loudspeakers or on the radio. Neologisms were introduced and everyday vocabulary was altered to encourage a more collectivist mentality; Cambodians were encouraged to talk about themselves in the plural "we" rather than the singular "I". While working in the fields, people were typically segregated by sex. Sport was prohibited. The only reading material that the population were permitted to read was that produced by the government, most notably the newspaper Padevat ("Revolution"). Restrictions were placed on movement, with people permitted to travel only with the permission of the local Khmer Rouge authorities.

=== Democratic Kampuchea: 1976–1979 ===
Pol Pot in 1977

The flag of Democratic Kampuchea

In January 1976, a cabinet meeting was held to promulgate a new constitution declaring that the country was to be renamed "Democratic Kampuchea". The constitution asserted state ownership of the means of production, declared the equality of men and women, and the rights and obligation of all citizens to work. It outlined that the country would be governed by a three-person presidium, and at the time Pol Pot and Khmer Rouge leaders expected that Sihanouk would take one of these roles. Sihanouk was nevertheless increasingly uncomfortable with the new government and in March he resigned his role as head of state. Pol Pot tried repeatedly, but unsuccessfully, to get him to change his mind. Sihanouk asked to be allowed to travel to China, citing the need for medical treatment, but this was denied. He was instead kept in his palace, which was sufficiently stocked with goods to allow him a luxurious lifestyle throughout the Khmer Rouge years.

The removal of Sihanouk ended the pretence that the Khmer Rouge government was a united front. With Sihanouk no longer part of the government, Pol Pot's government stated that the "national revolution" was over and that the "socialist revolution" could begin, allowing the country to move towards pure communism as swiftly as possible. Pol Pot described the new state as "a precious model for humanity" with a revolutionary spirit that outstripped that of earlier revolutionary socialist movements. In the 1970s, world communism was at its strongest point in history, and Pol Pot presented the Cambodian example as the one which other revolutionary movements should follow.

As part of the new Presidium, Pol Pot became the country's new prime minister. It was at this point that he took on the public pseudonym of "Pol Pot"; as no-one in the country knew who this was, a fictitious biography was presented. Pol Pot's key allies took the other two positions, with Nuon Chea as President of the Standing Committee of the National Assembly and Khieu Samphan as the head of state. In principle, the Khmer Rouge Standing Committee made decisions on the basis of the principle of democratic centralism. In reality it was more autocratic, with Pol Pot's decisions being implemented. The parliament which had been elected the previous year never met after 1976. In September 1976, Pol Pot publicly revealed that the "Angkar", or "Organization", as the secretive body exercising supreme power was known, was a Marxist–Leninist organisation. In September 1977, at a rally in the Olympic Stadium, Pol Pot then revealed that "Angkar" was a pseudonym for the CPK. In September 1976, it was announced that Pol Pot had stepped down as prime minister, to be replaced by Nuon Chea, but in reality he remained in power, returning to his former position in October. This was possibly a diversionary tactic to distract the Vietnamese government while Pol Pot purged the CPK of individuals he suspected of harbouring Vietnamese sympathies. Despite their Marxist pretences, the Khmer Rouge sought to eradicate the working class, seeing it as a "decadent relic of the past". The Khmer Rouge also renounced communism in 1977, with Ieng Sary stating "We are not communists ... we are revolutionaries [who do not] belong to the commonly accepted grouping of communist Indochina."

The standard of the [Bolshevik] revolution of 7 November 1917, was raised very high, but Khrushchev pulled it down. The standard of Mao's [Chinese] revolution of 1949 stands high until now, but it has faded and is wavering: it is no longer firm. The standard of the [Cambodian] revolution of 17 April 1975, raised by Comrade Pol Pot, is brilliant red, full of determination, wonderfully firm and wonderfully clear-sighted. The whole world admires us, sings our praises and learns from us.

— Pol Pot

The Cambodian population were officially known by the term "Kampuchean" rather than "Khmer" to avoid the ethnic specificity associated with the latter term. The Khmer language, now labelled "Kampuchean" by the government, was the only legally recognised language, and the Sino-Khmer minority were banned from speaking in the Chinese languages they commonly used. Pressure was exerted on the Cham to culturally assimilate into the larger Khmer population.

Pol Pot initiated a series of major irrigation projects across the country. In the Eastern Zone, for instance, a huge dam was built. Many of these irrigation projects failed due to a lack of technical expertise on the part of the workers.

The Standing Committee agreed to link several villages in a single co-operative of 500 to 1000 families, with the goal of later forming commune-sized units twice that size. Communal kitchens were also introduced so that all members of a commune ate together rather than in their individual homes. Foraging or hunting for additional food was prohibited, regarded as individualistic behaviour. From the summer of 1976, the government ordered that children over the age of seven would live not with their parents but communally with Khmer Rouge instructors. The co-operatives produced less food than the government believed, in part due to a lack of motivation among labourers and the diversion of the strongest workers to irrigation projects. Fearing criticism, many party cadres falsely claimed that they had met the government's food production quota. The government became aware of this, and by the end of 1976 Pol Pot acknowledged food shortages in three quarters of the country.

Members of the Khmer Rouge received special privileges not enjoyed by the rest of the population. Party members had better food, with cadres sometimes having access to clandestine brothels. Members of the Central Committee could go to China for medical treatment, and the highest echelons of the party had access to imported luxury products.

==== Purges and executions ====
The Khmer Rouge also classified people based on their religious and ethnic backgrounds. Under the leadership of Pol Pot, the Khmer Rouge had a policy of state atheism. Buddhist monks were viewed as social parasites and designated a "special class". Within a year of the Khmer Rouge's victory in the civil war, the country's monks were set to manual labour in the rural co-operatives and irrigation projects. Despite its ideological iconoclasm, many historical monuments were left undamaged by the Khmer Rouge; for Pol Pot's government, like its predecessors, the historic state of Angkor was a key point of reference.

Several isolated revolts broke out against Pol Pot's government. The Khmer Rouge Western Zone regional chief Koh Kong and his followers began launching small-scale attacks on government targets along the Thai border. There were also several village rebellions among the Cham. In February 1976, explosions in Siem Reap destroyed a munitions depot. Pol Pot suspected senior military figures were behind the bombing and, although unable to prove who was responsible, had several army officers arrested.

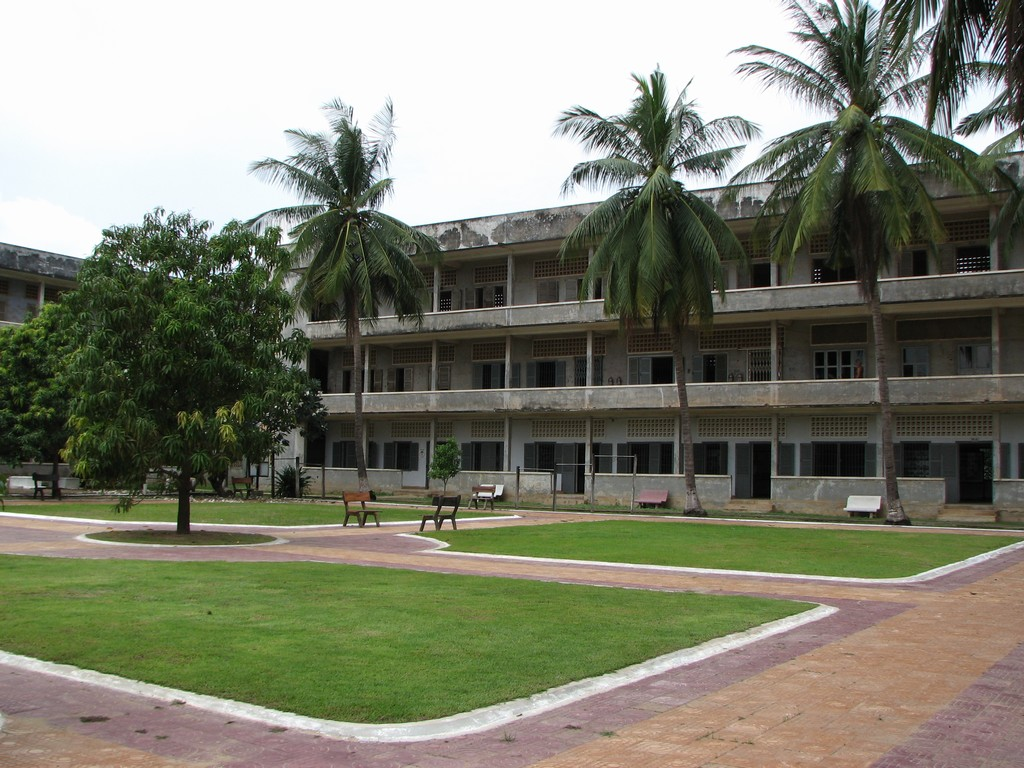
The Tuol Sleng School, also known as S-21, where those regarded as enemies of the government were tortured and killed

In September 1976, various party members were arrested and accused of conspiring with Vietnam to overthrow Pol Pot's government. Over the coming months the numbers arrested grew. The government invented claims of assassination attempts against its leading members to justify this internal crack-down within the CPK itself. These party members were accused of being spies for either the CIA, the Soviet KGB, or the Vietnamese. They were encouraged to confess to the accusations, often after torture or the threat of torture, with these confessions then being read out at party meetings. As well as in the area around Phnom Penh, trusted party cadres were sent into the country's zones to initiate further purges among the party membership there.

The Khmer Rouge converted a disused secondary school in Phnom Penh's Tuol Sleng region into a security prison, S-21. It was placed under the responsibility of the defence minister, Son Sen. The numbers sent to S-21 grew steadily as the CPK purge proceeded. In the first half of 1976, about 400 people were sent there; in the second half of the year that number was nearer to 1,000. By the spring of 1977, 1,000 people were being sent there each month. Between 15,000 and 20,000 people would be killed at S-21 during the Khmer Rouge period. About a dozen of them were Westerners. Pol Pot never personally visited S-21.

From late 1976 onward, and especially in the middle of 1977, the levels of violence increased across Democratic Kampuchea, particularly at the village level. In rural areas, most of the killings were perpetrated by young cadres who were enforcing what they believed to be the government's will. Across the country, peasant cadres tortured and killed members of their communities whom they disliked. Many cadres ate the livers of their victims and tore unborn fetuses from their mothers for use as koan kroach talismans. The CPK Central Command was aware of such practices but did nothing to stop them. By 1977, the growing violence, coupled with poor food, was generating disillusionment even within the Khmer Rouge's core support base. Growing numbers of Cambodians attempted to flee into Thailand and Vietnam. In the autumn of 1977, Pol Pot declared the purges at an end. According to the CPK's own figures, by August 1977 between 4,000 and 5,000 party members had been liquidated as "enemy agents" or "bad elements".

In 1978, the government initiated a second purge, during which tens of thousands of Cambodians were accused of being Vietnamese sympathisers and killed. At this point the remaining CPK members who had spent time in Hanoi were killed, along with their children. In January 1978, Pol Pot announced to his colleagues that their slogan should be "Purify the Party! Purify the army! Purify the cadres!"

==== Foreign relations ====
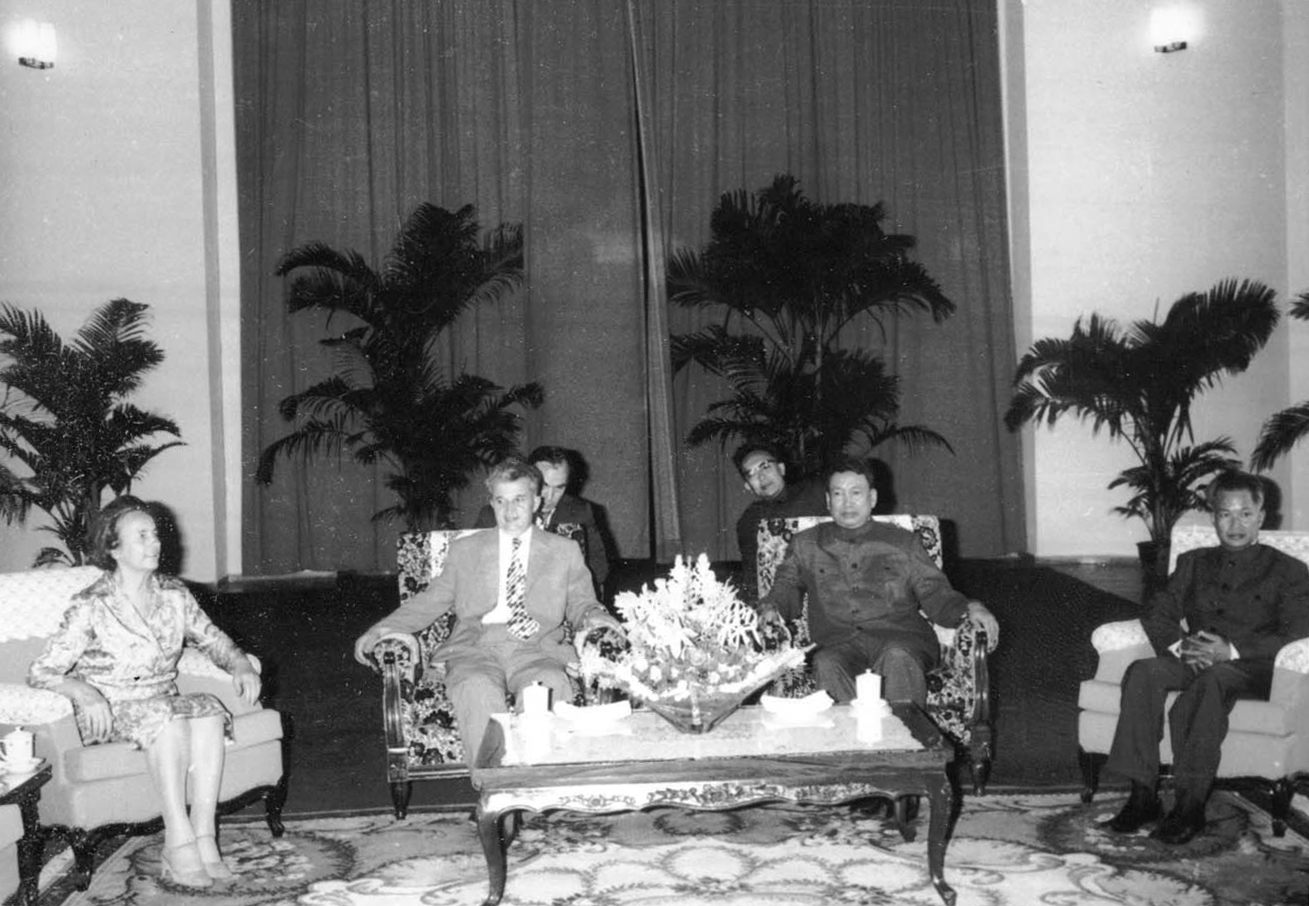
Pol Pot meeting with Romanian Marxist leader Nicolae Ceaușescu during the latter's visit to Cambodia in 1978

Outwardly, relations between Cambodia and Vietnam were warm following the establishment of Democratic Kampuchea; after Vietnam was unified in July 1976, the Cambodian government issued a message of congratulations. Privately, relations between the two were declining. In a speech on the first anniversary of their victory in the civil war, Khieu referred to the Vietnamese as imperialists. In May 1976, a negotiation to draw up a formal border between the two countries failed.

On taking power, the Khmer Rouge spurned both the Western states and the Soviet Union as sources of support. Instead, China became Cambodia's main international partner. With Vietnam increasingly siding with the Soviet Union over China, the Chinese saw Pol Pot's government as a bulwark against Vietnamese influence in Indochina. Mao pledged $1 billion in military and economic aid to Cambodia, including an immediate $20 million grant. Many thousands of Chinese military advisors and technicians were also sent to the country to assist in projects like the construction of the Kampong Chhnang military airport. The relationship between the Chinese and Cambodian governments was nevertheless marred by mutual suspicion and China had little influence on Pol Pot's domestic policies. It had greater influence on Cambodia's foreign policy, successfully pushing the country to pursue rapprochement with Thailand and open communication with the U.S. to combat Vietnamese influence in the region. Historian Peter Maguire writes that the U.S. "gave $85 million to the Khmer Rouge between 1980 and 1986," roughly half of which occurred "during the crucial years of 1979 and 1980", although the U.S. Government denies these claims.

After Mao died in September 1976, Pol Pot praised him and Cambodia declared an official period of mourning. In November 1976, Pol Pot travelled secretly to Beijing, seeking to retain his country's alliance with China after the Gang of Four were arrested. From Beijing, he was then taken on a tour of China, visiting sites associated with Mao and the Chinese Communist Party. The Chinese were the only country allowed to retain their old Phnom Penh embassy. All other diplomats were made to live in assigned quarters on the Boulevard Monivong. This street was barricaded off and the diplomats were not permitted to leave without escorts. Their food was brought to them and provided through the only shop that remained open in the country. Pol Pot saw the Khmer Rouge as an example that should be copied by other revolutionary movements across the world and courted Marxist leaders from Burma, Indonesia, Malaysia, and Thailand, allowing Thai Marxists to establish bases along the Cambodian border with Thailand. In November 1977, Burma's Ne Win was the first foreign head of government to visit Democratic Kampuchea, followed soon after by Romania's Nicolae Ceaușescu.

The foreign policies of Pol Pot were influenced by maoist ideology.

==== Number of deaths ====
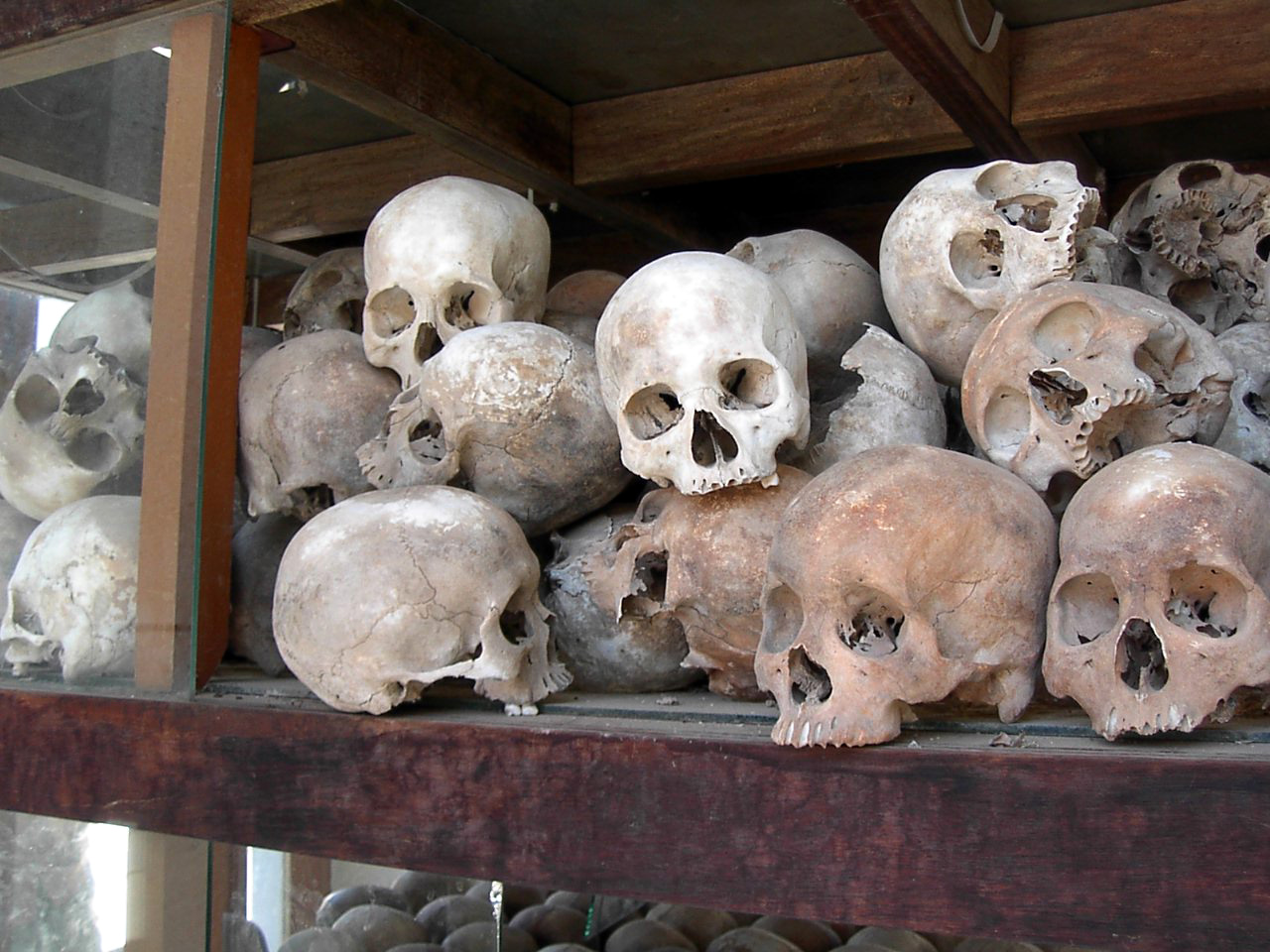
Skulls of Khmer Rouge victims

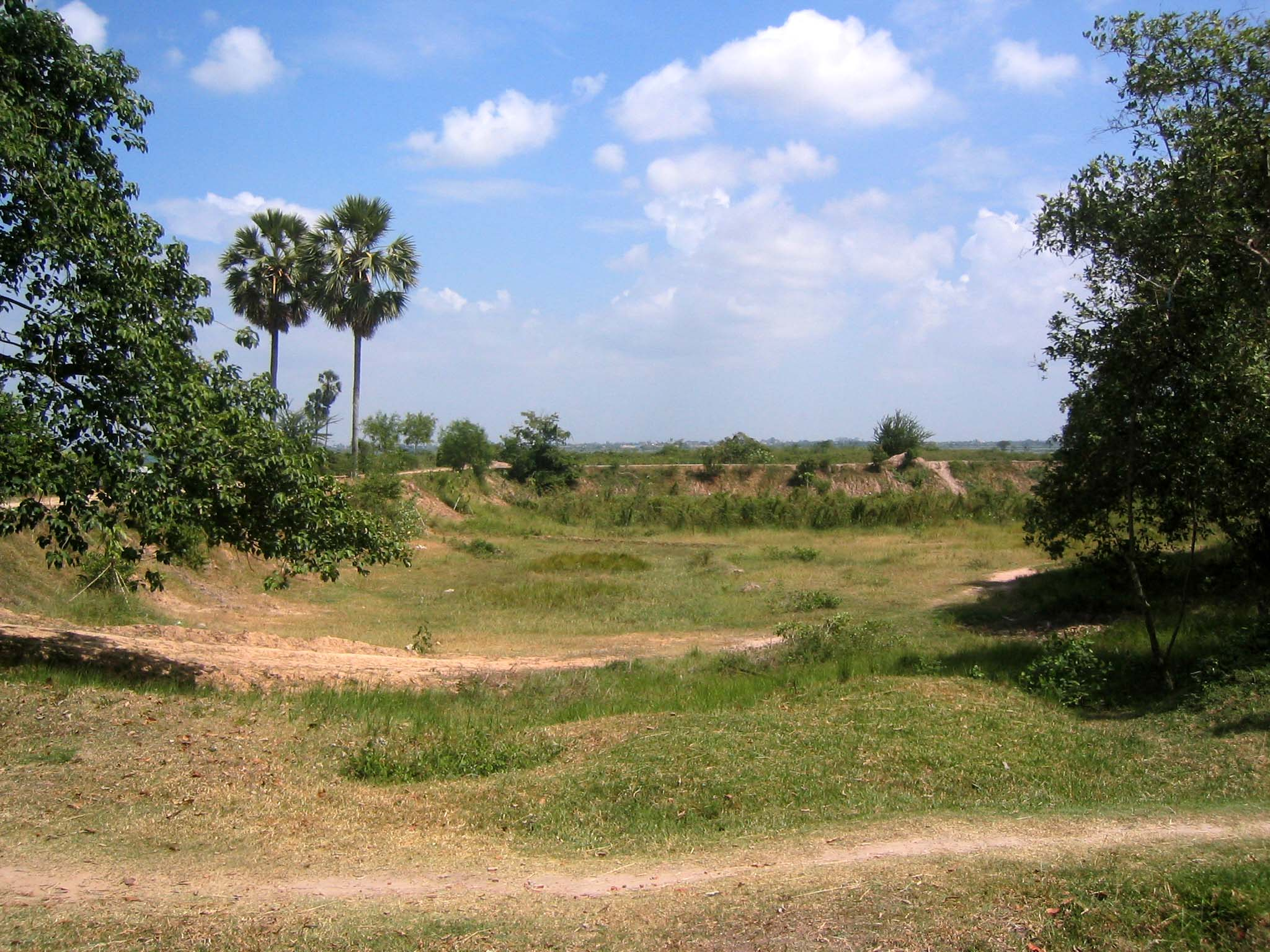
Mass grave in Choeung Ek

Ben Kiernan estimates that 1.671 million to 1.871 million Cambodians died as a result of Khmer Rouge policy, or between 21% and 24% of Cambodia's 1975 population. A study by French demographer Marek Sliwinski calculated slightly fewer than 2 million unnatural deaths under the Khmer Rouge out of a 1975 Cambodian population of 7.8 million; 33.5% of Cambodian men died under the Khmer Rouge compared to 15.7% of Cambodian women. According to a 2001 academic source, the most widely accepted estimates of excess deaths under the Khmer Rouge range from 1.5 million to 2 million, although figures as low as 1 million and as high as 3 million have been cited; conventionally accepted estimates of deaths due to Khmer Rouge executions range from 500,000 to 1 million, "a third to one half of excess mortality during the period". However, a 2013 academic source (citing research from 2009) indicates that execution may have accounted for as much as 60% of the total, with 23,745 mass graves containing approximately 1.3 million suspected victims of execution.

While considerably higher than earlier and more widely accepted estimates of Khmer Rouge executions, the Documentation Center of Cambodia (DC-Cam)'s Craig Etcheson defended such estimates of over one million executions as "plausible, given the nature of the mass grave and DC-Cam's methods, which are more likely to produce an under-count of bodies rather than an over-estimate." Demographer Patrick Heuveline estimated that between 1.17 million and 3.42 million Cambodians died unnatural deaths between 1970 and 1979, with between 150,000 and 300,000 of those deaths occurring during the civil war. Heuveline's central estimate is 2.52 million excess deaths, of which 1.4 million were the direct result of violence. Despite being based on a house-to-house survey of Cambodians, the estimate of 3.3 million deaths promulgated by the Khmer Rouge's successor regime, the People's Republic of Kampuchea (PRK), is generally considered to be an exaggeration; among other methodological errors, the PRK authorities added the estimated number of victims that had been found in the partially-exhumed mass graves to the raw survey results, meaning that some victims would have been double-counted.

An estimated 300,000 Cambodians starved to death between 1979 and 1980, largely as a result of the after-effects of Khmer Rouge policies.

=== Fall of Democratic Kampuchea ===
In December 1976, the Kampuchean Communist Party Central Committee's annual plenum proposed the country ready itself for the prospect of war with Vietnam. Pol Pot believed that Vietnam was committed to expansionism and thus was a threat to Cambodian independence. There were renewed border clashes between Cambodia and Vietnam in early 1977, continuing into April. On 30 April, Cambodian units, backed by artillery fire, entered Vietnam and attacked a series of villages, killing several hundred Vietnamese civilians. Vietnam responded by ordering its Air Force to bomb Cambodian border positions. Several months later, the fighting resumed; in September, two divisions of the Cambodian Eastern Zone entered the Tay Ninh area of Vietnam, where they attacked several villages and slaughtered their inhabitants. That month, Pol Pot travelled to Beijing, and from there to North Korea, where Kim Il Sung spoke out against Vietnam in solidarity with the Khmer Rouge.

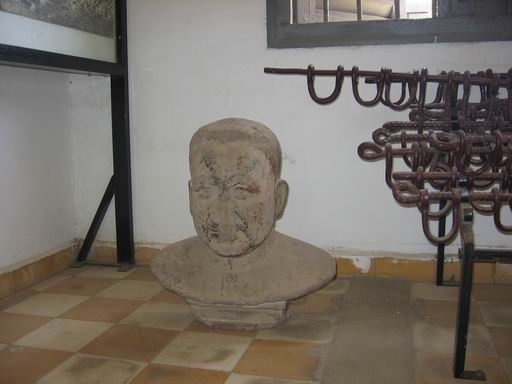
Busts of Pol Pot were produced in anticipation of a cult of personality ultimately never realized. This example is displayed in the Tuol Sleng Genocide Museum.

In December, Vietnam sent 50,000 troops over the border along a 100-mile stretch, penetrating 12 miles into Cambodia. Cambodia then formally broke off diplomatic relations with Vietnam. Cambodian forces fought back against the invaders, who had withdrawn to Vietnam by 6 January 1978. At this point, Pol Pot ordered Cambodia's military to take an aggressive, proactive stance, attacking Vietnamese troops before the latter had the chance to act. In January and February 1978, the Cambodian Army launched raids on various Vietnamese villages. The Vietnamese Politburo then concluded that it must not leave Pol Pot in power, but must remove him from power before the Cambodian military strengthened further. In 1978, it established military training camps for Cambodian refugees in southern Vietnam, forming the nucleus of a future Cambodian regime. The Cambodian government also readied itself for war. Plans for a personality cult revolving around Pol Pot were drawn up, based on the Chinese and North Korean models, in the belief that such a cult would unify the population in wartime. Large photographs of Pol Pot began to be placed in communal dining halls, while oil paintings and busts of him were produced. The cult was ultimately never implemented.

The failure of Cambodian troops in the Eastern Zone to successfully resist the Vietnamese incursion made Pol Pot suspicious of their allegiances. He ordered a purge of the Eastern Zone, with over 400 CPK cadres from the area being sent to S-21. Aware that they would be killed on Pol Pot's orders, increasing numbers of Eastern Zone troops began rebelling against the Khmer Rouge government. Pol Pot sent more troops into the Eastern Zone to defeat the rebels, ordering them to slaughter the inhabitants of any villages that were believed to be harbouring any rebel forces. This suppression in the east was, according to Short, "the bloodiest single episode under Pol Pot's rule". Fleeing the government troops, many leading rebels—including Zone deputy chiefs Heng Samrin and Pol Saroeun—made it into Vietnam, where they joined the anti-Pol Pot exile community. By August 1978, Pol Pot could only consider Mok's forces in the south-west and Pauk's in the Central Zone as being reliable.

Early in 1978, Pol Pot's government began trying to improve relations with various foreign countries, such as Thailand, to bolster its position against Vietnam. Many other governments in Southeast Asia sympathised with Cambodia's situation, fearing the impact of Vietnamese expansionism and Soviet influence on their own countries. Although supportive of the Cambodians, the Chinese government decided not to send its army into Cambodia, fearing that an all-out conflict with Vietnam could provoke a war with the Soviet Union. Meanwhile, Vietnam was planning its full-scale invasion of Cambodia. In December 1978, it formally launched the Khmer National United Front for National Salvation (KNUFNS), a group made up of Cambodian exiles which it hoped to install in place of the Khmer Rouge. Initially, KNUFNS was headed by Heng Samrin. Fearing this Vietnamese threat, Pol Pot wrote an anti-Vietnamese tract titled the Black Paper.

In September 1978, Pol Pot began increasingly courting Sihanouk in the hope that the latter could prove a rallying point in support of the Khmer Rouge government. That same month, Pol Pot flew to China to meet with Deng. Deng condemned Vietnamese aggression but suggested that the Khmer Rouge had precipitated the conflict by being too radical in its policies and by allowing Cambodian troops to behave anarchically along the border with Vietnam. On returning to Cambodia, in October Pol Pot ordered the country's army to switch tactics, adopting a defensive strategy involving the heavy use of land mines to stop Vietnamese incursions. He also cautioned the army to avoid direct confrontations which would incur heavy losses and instead adopt guerrilla tactics. In November 1978, the CPK held its Fifth Congress. Here, Mok was appointed the third ranked figure in the government, behind Pol Pot and Nuon Chea. Soon after the Congress, two senior government members—Vorn Vet and Kong Sophal—were arrested and sent to S-21. This precipitated another round of purges.

=== Vietnamese Invasion: 1978–1979 ===
On 25 December 1978, the Vietnamese Army launched its full-scale invasion. Its columns initially advanced into north-east Cambodia, taking Kratie on 30 December and Stung Treng on 3 January. The Vietnamese main force then entered Cambodia on 1 January 1979, heading along Highways one and seven toward Phnom Penh. Cambodia's forward defences failed to stop them. With an attack on Phnom Penh imminent, in January Pol Pot ordered Sihanouk and his family to be sent to Thailand. The entire diplomatic corps followed shortly after. On 7 January, Pol Pot and other senior government figures left the city and drove to Pursat. They spent two days there before moving on to Battambang.

After the Khmer Rouge evacuated Phnom Penh, Mok was the only senior government figure left in the city, tasked with overseeing its defence. Nuon Chea ordered the cadres in control of S-21 to kill all remaining inmates prior to it being captured by the Vietnamese. However, the troops guarding the city were unaware how close the Vietnamese Army actually were; the government had concealed the extent of the Vietnamese gains from the population. As the Vietnamese approached, many officers and other soldiers guarding the city fled; the defence was highly disorganised. There were isolated examples of Cambodian villagers killing Khmer Rouge officials in revenge. In January, Vietnam installed a new government under Samrin, composed of Khmer Rouge who had fled to Vietnam to avoid the purges. The new government renamed Cambodia the "People's Republic of Kampuchea". Although many Cambodians had initially hailed the Vietnamese as saviours, over time resentment against the occupying force grew.

The Khmer Rouge turned to China for support against the invasion. Sary travelled to China via Thailand. There, Deng urged the Khmer Rouge to continue a guerrilla war against the Vietnamese and to establish a broad, non-communist front against the invaders, with a prominent role given to Sihanouk. China sent its vice premier, Geng Biao, to Thailand to negotiate the shipment of arms to the Khmer Rouge through Thailand. China also sent diplomats to stay with the Khmer Rouge encampments near the Thai border. Pol Pot met with these diplomats twice before the Chinese government withdrew them for their safety in March. In China, the Khmer Rouge set up their "Voice of Democratic Kampuchea" radio station, which remained their main outlet for communicating with the world. In February, the Chinese attacked northern Vietnam, hoping to draw Vietnamese troops away from the invasion of Cambodia. As well as China, the Khmer Rouge also received the support of the United States and most other non-Marxist southeast Asian countries who feared Vietnamese aggression as a tool of Soviet influence in the region.

On 15 January, the Vietnamese reached Sisophon. Pol Pot, Nuon Chea, and Khieu Samphan then moved to Palin on the Thai side of the border, and in late January relocated again, to Tasanh, where Sary joined them. There, on 1 February, they held a Central Committee conference, deciding against Deng's advice about a united front. In the second half of March, the Vietnamese moved to hem in the Khmer Rouge along the Thai border, where many of Pol Pot's troops had crossed into Thailand itself. The Vietnamese advanced on Tasanh, from which the Khmer Rouge leaders had fled only a few hours before it was captured.

== After Democratic Kampuchea ==
=== Fighting back against the Vietnamese: 1979–1989 ===
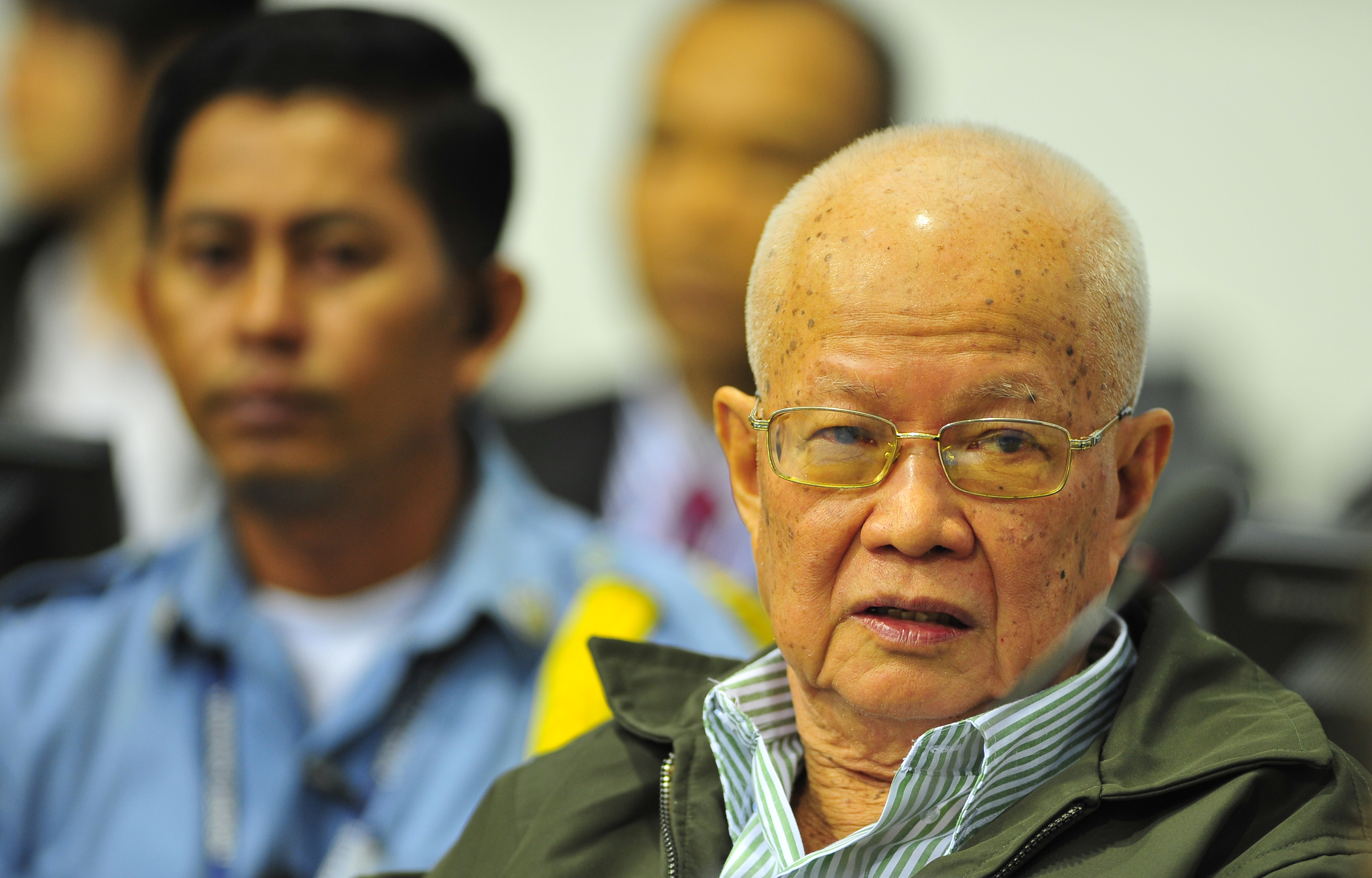
In 1979, Khieu Samphan (pictured here in 2011) replaced Pol Pot as Prime Minister of Democratic Kampuchea.

In July 1979, Pol Pot established a new headquarters, Office 131, on the western flank of Mount Thom. He dropped the name "Pol Pot" and began calling himself "Phem". In September 1979, Khieu announced that the Khmer Rouge was establishing a new united front, the Patriotic Democratic Front, bringing together all Cambodians who opposed the Vietnamese occupation. Senior Khmer Rouge members began disavowing the cause of socialism. The group members stopped wearing uniform black outfits; Pol Pot himself started wearing jungle green fatigues and later Thai-made safari suits. Short believed that these changes reflected a genuine ideological shift in the Khmer Rouge. In October, Pol Pot ordered an end to executions, a command which was largely followed. In November 1979, the United Nations General Assembly voted to recognise the Khmer Rouge delegation, rather than that of the Vietnamese-backed government, as the legitimate government of Cambodia. In December, Samphan replaced Pol Pot as prime minister of Democratic Kampuchea, a move that allowed Pol Pot to focus on the war effort and which was perhaps also designed to improve the Khmer Rouge's image.

During the monsoons of summer 1979, the Khmer Rouge troops began filtering back into Cambodia. Many young Cambodians joined the Khmer Rouge forces, wanting to drive the Vietnamese Army out. Boosted by the new Chinese supplies, the Khmer Rouge rebuilt its military structure in early 1980. By mid-1980, the Khmer Rouge claimed it had 40,000 troops active in Cambodia. From 1981, Pol Pot's main goal was to attract popular support among the Cambodian population, believing that this would be vital in enabling him to win the war. In August 1981, he travelled, via Bangkok, to Beijing, where he met with Deng and Zhao Ziyang. Deng had been pushing for Sihanouk, living in Pyongyang, to become Cambodian head of state, something the monarch had reluctantly agreed to in February 1981. In September, Sihanouk, Samphan, and Son Sann issued a joint statement in Singapore announcing the formation of their own coalition government.

I am old now and handicapped. I know that people inside Cambodia fear me. So when we drive out the contemptible Vietnamese and gain peace, I will retire if the comrades so desire. But if I return now, and the comrades can't drive out the Vietnamese, how can I sit still? I must share my experience and knowledge. If the Vietnamese leave and we can defend our country, I will ... retire. And when I die I will die peacefully.

— Pol Pot, 1987

In December 1981, Pol Pot and Nuon Chea decided to dissolve the Communist Party of Kampuchea, a decision taken with very little discussion among the party's membership, some of whom were shocked. Many outside commentators believed the dissolution was a ruse, and that the CPK was actually going underground once more, although Short noted that this was not the case. Pol Pot proposed a new Movement of Nationalists that would replace the party, although this failed to fully materialise. The CPK Standing Committee was replaced by a Military Directorate, the focus of which was on driving out the Vietnamese. Pol Pot's decision to disband the party was informed by global events; his anti-Vietnamese army was backed by many capitalist countries while the Vietnamese were backed by most Marxist-governed countries. At the same time, he believed that his main Marxist backers, the Chinese, were themselves restoring capitalism with Deng's reforms. Reflecting the ideological shift, among the Khmer Rouge, collective eating was ended, the ban on individual possessions was lifted, and children were again allowed to live with their parents. Pol Pot commented that his previous administration had been too left-wing and claimed that it had made mistakes because he had placed too much trust in treacherous individuals around him.

In June 1982, at an event in Kuala Lumpur, the Khmer Rouge were among the factions declaring the formation of a Coalition Government of Democratic Kampuchea (CGDK) as an alternative to the administration in Phnom Penh. On the ground in Cambodia there nevertheless remained little military collaboration between these factions, which included the Khmer Rouge as well as the Sihanoukist National Army and Son Sann's Khmer People's National Liberation Front. In 1983, Pol Pot travelled to Bangkok for a medical check-up; there he was diagnosed with Hodgkin's disease. In mid-1984, Office 131 was moved to a new base further into Cambodia, near the O'Suosadey river. In December, the Vietnamese Army launched a major offensive, overrunning the Khmer Rouge's Cambodian base and pushing Pol Pot back into Thailand. There, he established a new base, K-18, several miles outside Trat.

In September 1985, Pol Pot resigned as commander-in-chief of the Khmer Rouge forces in favour of Son Sen; he nevertheless continued to wield significant influence. In the summer he married a young woman named Mea; the following spring their daughter, Sitha, was born. He then travelled to Beijing to undergo cancer treatment at a military hospital, only returning to Cambodia in the summer of 1988. In 1988, the anti-Vietnamese factions entered into negotiations with the Phnom Penh government. Pol Pot deemed this too soon, for he feared that the Khmer Rouge had not gained sufficient popular support to produce significant gains in any post-war election.

=== Fall of the Khmer Rouge: 1990–1998 ===
The fall of the Berlin Wall and the subsequent end of the Cold War had repercussions for Cambodia. With the Soviet Union no longer a threat, the U.S. and its allies no longer saw Vietnamese domination of Cambodia as an issue. The U.S. announced that it no longer recognised the CGDK as the legitimate government of Cambodia at the UN General Assembly. In June, the various Cambodian factions agreed to a ceasefire, to be overseen by the United Nations, with the formation of a new Supreme National Council to facilitate the implementation of democratic elections. Pol Pot agreed to these terms, fearing that if he refused the other factions would all unite against the Khmer Rouge. In November, Sihanouk returned to Cambodia. There, he praised the Vietnamese-backed leader, Hun Sen, and stated that the Khmer Rouge's leaders should be put on trial for their crimes. When Samphan arrived in Phnom Penh with the Khmer Rouge's delegation, he was beaten by a mob.

Pol Pot established a new headquarters along the border, near Pailin province. He called on the Khmer Rouge to redouble their efforts in gaining support across Cambodia's villages. In June, Samphan announced that in contravention of earlier agreements its troops would not disarm, stating that it refused to do so while Vietnamese soldiers remained in Cambodia. The Khmer Rouge became increasingly confrontational, expanding its territory across western Cambodia. It carried out massacres of the Vietnamese settlers who had recently arrived in the area. Hun Sen's forces also carried out military activities, with UN peacekeepers proving ineffective in preventing the violence. In January 1993, Sihanouk returned to Beijing, declaring that Cambodia was unprepared for elections. The Khmer Rouge had formed a new party, the Cambodian National Unity Party, through which it could take part in the election, but in March Pol Pot announced that they would boycott the vote. At this point he moved his headquarters to Phnom Chhat; Samphan joined him there, having withdrawn his Khmer Rouge delegation from Phnom Penh.

In the May 1993 elections, Norodom Ranariddh's FUNCINPEC won 58 of the 120 available seats in the National Assembly; Hun Sen's Cambodian People's Party came second. Sen, who was backed by the Vietnamese, refused to acknowledge defeat. Sihanouk negotiated the formation of a coalition government between the two parties, introducing a system whereby Cambodia would have two prime ministers, Ranariddh and Sen. The new Cambodian National Army then launched an offensive against the Khmer Rouge. By August, it had captured Phnom Chhat, with Pol Pot fleeing back into Thailand. The Khmer Rouge launched a counter-offensive, having regained much of the territory they recently lost by May 1994. Pol Pot moved to Anlong Veng, but as that was overrun in 1994 he relocated to Kbal Ansoang, on the crest of the Dângrêk Mountains. The Khmer Rouge nevertheless faced growing levels of desertion over the first half of the 1990s.

Pol Pot placed renewed emphasis on those living in Khmer Rouge territory imitating the lives of the poorest peasants and in 1994 ordered the confiscation of private transport and an end to cross-border trade with Thailand. In September he ordered the execution of a Briton, a Frenchman, and an Australian who had been captured in a Khmer Rouge attack on a train. In July 1996, a mutiny broke out among the Khmer Rouge and in August it was announced that Ieng Sary, Y Chhean, and Sok Pheap were breaking away from the movement, taking troops loyal to them. This meant that around 4,000 soldiers left, almost halving the troop forces that the Khmer Rouge then commanded. By the end of 1996, the Khmer Rouge had lost almost all the territory they held in the interior of Cambodia, being restricted to a few hundred miles along the northern border. Pol Pot commented to his aides: "We are like a fish in a trap. We cannot last like this for very long". Pol Pot's health was declining. He suffered from aortic stenosis and no longer had access to follow-up treatment for his earlier cancer. A stroke left him paralysed on the left side of his body, and he eventually required daily access to oxygen. He spent increasing amounts of time with his family, in particular his daughter.

=== Imprisonment and death: 1997–1998 ===
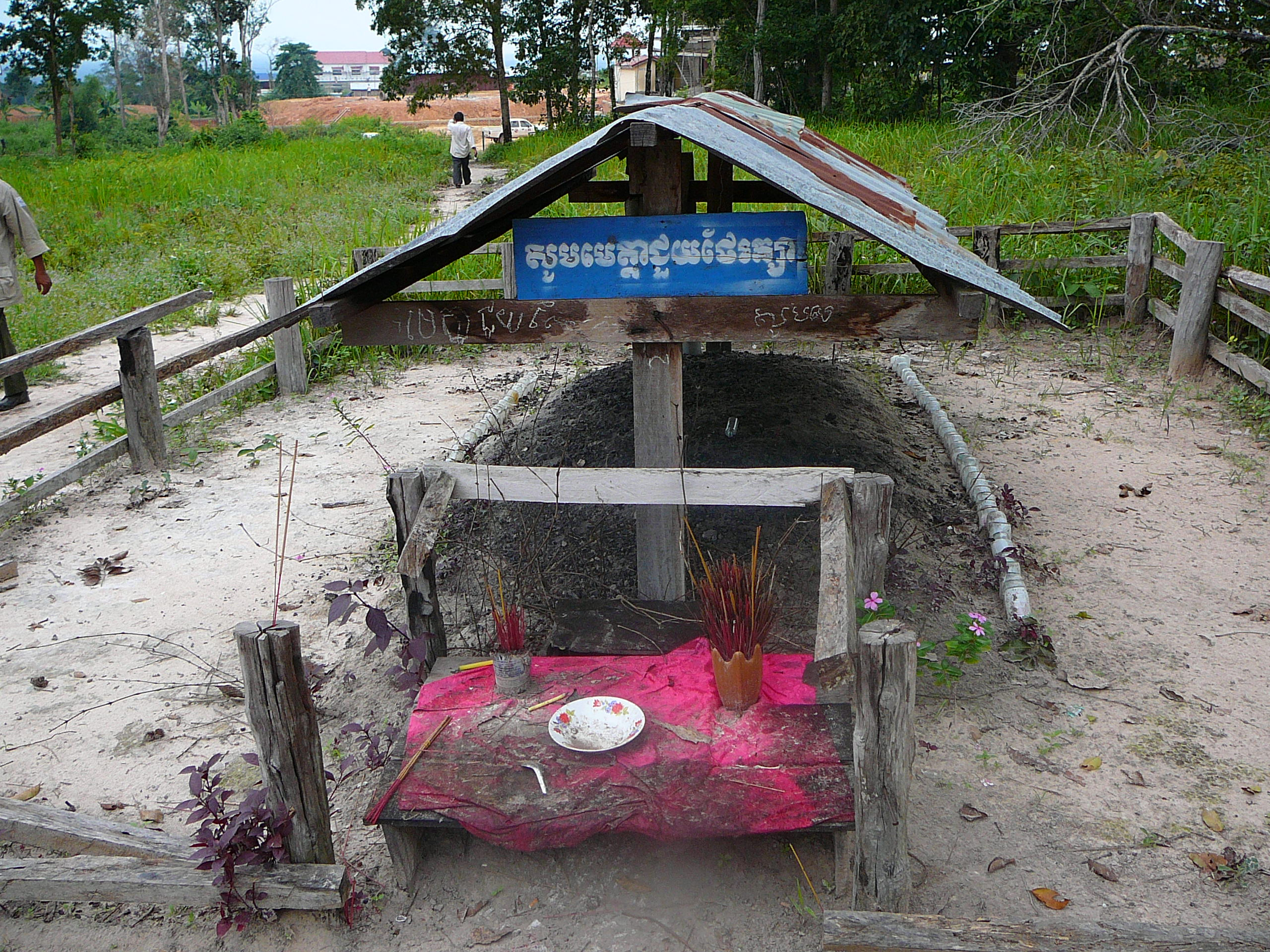
Pol Pot's grave in the Anlong Veng District of Oddar Meanchey province

Pol Pot had grown suspicious of Son Sen and in June 1997 ordered his assassination. Khmer Rouge cadres subsequently killed Sen and 13 of his family members and aides; Pol Pot later stated that he had not sanctioned all of these killings. Ta Mok was concerned that Pol Pot could turn on him too. Mok rallied troops loyal to him at Anlong Veng, informing them that Pol Pot had betrayed their movement, and then headed to Kbal Ansoang. Fearing Mok's troops, on 12 June Pol Pot, his family, and several bodyguards fled on foot. Pol Pot was very frail and had to be carried. After Mok's troops apprehended them, Pol Pot was placed under house arrest. Khieu Samphan and Nuon Chea sided with Mok.

American journalist Nate Thayer conducted Pol Pot's last interview while Pol Pot was under house arrest. Pol Pot stated that his "conscience is clear" but acknowledged that mistakes were made and told Thayer that "I want you to know that everything I did, I did for my country". He also rejected the idea that millions had died saying "To say that millions died is too much" and that "You know, for the other people, the babies, the young ones, I did not order them to be killed".

In late July, Pol Pot and the three Khmer Rouge commanders who remained loyal to him were brought before a mass meeting near Sang'nam. Thayer was invited to film the event. There, the Khmer Rouge sentenced Pol Pot to life imprisonment; the three other commanders were sentenced to death. Three months later, Ta Mok permitted Thayer to visit and interview Pol Pot, but, according to Thayer:

Pol Pot said nothing. They made it clear and I believed them, that I was to interview Pol Pot after the trial. Pol Pot literally had to be carried away from the trial—he was unable to walk—and I was not able to talk to him. I did try to talk to him ... he did not answer any questions, and he did not speak during the trial.

Their previous interview turned out to be Pol Pot's last.

On 15 April 1998, Pol Pot died in his sleep of a heart attack. Thayer, who was present, claimed that Pol Pot killed himself when he became aware of Ta Mok's plan to hand him over to the United States, saying that "Pol Pot died after ingesting a lethal dose of a combination of Valium and chloroquine". His body was preserved with ice after an improvised embalming with formaldehyde had failed, so that his death could be verified by journalists attending his funeral. Three days later, his wife cremated his body on a pyre of tyres and rubbish, utilising traditional Buddhist funerary rites.

In May, Pol Pot's widow and Tep Khunnal fled to Malaysia, where they married. The Khmer Rouge themselves continued to face territorial losses to the Cambodian Army and in March 1999 Ta Mok was also captured, and the Khmer Rouge effectively ceased to exist.

Pol Pot's ashes are buried in a small grave in Choam Sa-Ngam, Oddar Meanchey province. The grave is covered by a tin roof and surrounded by a small fence.

== Political ideology ==
Pol's aim was to plunge the country into an inferno of revolutionary change where, certainly, old ideas and those who refused to abandon them would perish in the flames, but from which Cambodia itself would emerge, strengthened and purified, as a paragon of communist virtue.

— Journalist Philip Short, 2004

Short noted that an underlying doctrinal view among the Khmer Rouge was that "it is always better to go too far than not far enough", an approach that was "at the root of many of the abuses" which occurred under their regime. Within the Khmer Rouge itself, hunger, lack of sleep, and long hours of labour were employed at training camps to ramp up the physical and mental pressure and thus facilitate indoctrination. Short commented that "no other communist party" in history ever went "so far in its attempts directly to remould the minds of its members".

Pol Pot disbanded his Communist Party during the 1980s in order to try to portray himself in a new, favourable light, and because most of his support came from capitalist nations. During that decade, Pol Pot frequently commented that "We chose communism because we wanted to restore our nation. We helped the Vietnamese, who were communist. But now the communists are fighting us. So we have to turn to the West and follow their way." This action led Short to suggest that "the veneer of Marxism-Leninism which had cloaked Cambodian radicalism had only ever been skin-deep." Before his death in 1997 he proclaimed that "when I die, my only wish is that Cambodia remain Cambodia and belong to the West. It is over for communism, and I want to stress that."

Pol Pot stated that he was inspired by what he saw happening in India with Gandhi and Nehru. He said that he started off as a "nationalist and then a patriot" before reading "progressive books" and the French newspaper L'Humanité while in Paris. Regarding the origin of his political views he remarked that "I cannot tell you of any single influence. Maybe it's a little from here, a little from there".

Short observed that decision-making in Pol Pot's Cambodia was "unruly", making it dissimilar from the centralised, organised processes which were found in other orthodox communist states. Within Democratic Kampuchea, there was much regional and local variation in how party cadres implemented Pol Pot's orders.

Deng Xiaoping criticised the Khmer Rouge for engaging in "deviations from Marxism-Leninism". Albania's Enver Hoxha referred to Pot as a "barbarous fascist".

External videos
- Presentation by Philip Short on Pol Pot: Anatomy of a Nightmare, 9 March 2005, C-SPAN

In re-interpreting the revolutionary role of classes and "behind the thinnest of Marxist veneers" on the proletariat, Pol Pot embraced the idea of a revolutionary alliance between the peasantry and the intellectuals.

Pol Pot's government was totalitarian, and he has been described as a dictator. Pol Pot desired autarky, or complete self-sufficiency, for Cambodia. Short suggested that Pol Pot had been "an authentic spokesman" for the yearning that many Khmer felt for "the return of their former greatness", the era of the Khmer Empire. Chandler noted that Pol Pot, like previous Cambodian leaders, emphasised the belief that Cambodia was purer than other nations. The party leadership has been described as xenophobic. Pol Pot repeatedly stated or implied that Cambodians were an intrinsically superior group to other ethnic or national groups and that they were immune to foreign influences. Short also noted that the Khmer Rouge generally regarded foreigners as enemies; during the Cambodian civil war, they killed numerous foreign journalists whom they captured, whereas the Vietnamese Marxists typically let them go. All religions were banned as part of the Khmer Rouge's attempt to eliminate religion in the country.

== Personal life and characteristics ==
To add to the confusion, even his [Pol Pot's] identity remains in question. In an interview with Yugoslav television in 1977, Pol Pot said he had come from a poor peasant family. But a Cambodian refugee in Paris, Laau Phuok, insists that Pol Pot's real name is Saloth Sar, and that his father was a landowner distantly related to the royal family. A third version is that Pol Pot is really Tol Sat, a revolutionary who was elected to the Khmer Rouge People's Representative Assembly in Phnom Penh in 1976. To complete the mystery, photographs of Pol Pot tend to change in appearance ever so slightly through the years.

— Journalist Christopher Jones, 1981

David Chandler characterized Pol Pot as having a thirst for power, being introspective, self-effacing, and displaying self-control. He was also described as being highly reclusive, obsessed with secrecy, and fearful of the threat of assassination. He was often in control while pretending not to be; Short stated that he "delighted in appearing to be what he was not – a nameless face in the crowd". During his political career, he used a wide array of pseudonyms: Pouk, Hay, Pol, 87, Grand-Uncle, Elder Brother, First Brother and in later years he used the pseudonyms 99 and Phem. He told a secretary that "the more often you change your name the better. It confuses the enemy". In later life he concealed and falsified many details of his life. He never explained why he chose the pseudonym "Pol Pot", although in 1997, William T. Vollmann stated that it was derived from the French phrase "politique potential".

According to the official biography of Pol Pot published in September 1978 by the Department of Press and Information Ministry of Foreign Affairs of Democratic Kampuchea, Pol Pot liked to live and work in the calm, he had "a large spirit of union", he showed "revolutionary optimism" and he was "deeply and firmly confident in the people, the masses, especially in the poor peasants". Pol Pot displayed what Chandler called a "genteel charisma", and what Short described as a "magnetic personality". As a child, his brother characterized him as having been sweet tempered and equable, while fellow school pupils recalled that Pol Pot was mediocre but pleasant. As a teacher, he was characterized by his pupils as having been calm, honest and persuasive, having an "evident good nature and an attractive personality". Chandler noted that he had the "common touch" when interacting with people; according to Short, Pol Pot's varied and eclectic upbringing meant that he was "able to communicate naturally with people of all sorts and conditions, establishing an instinctive rapport that invariably made them want to like him". Many observers commented on his distinctive smile. When speaking to audiences he usually carried a fan, which in Cambodian culture was traditionally associated with monkhood.

Pol Pot was softly spoken. During speeches he was serene and calm, even in the midst of using violent rhetoric. Chandler noted that when meeting with people, Pol Pot displayed an "apparent warmth" and was known for his "slowly uttered words". Kong Duong, who worked with Pol Pot in the 1980s, said that he was "very likeable, a really nice person. He was friendly, and everything he said seemed very sensible. He would never blame you or scold you to your face."

Pol Pot suffered from insomnia and was frequently ill. He suffered from malaria and intestinal ailments, which left him ill several times a year whilst he was in power. As well as having a love of traditional Khmer music, in childhood he became interested in romantic French poetry, with the work of Paul Verlaine being among his favourites.

Chandler suggested that the seven years that Pol Pot primarily spent in jungle encampments among his fellow Marxists had a significant effect on his world-view, and they "probably reinforced his sense of destiny and self-importance". Pol Pot had a nationalistic attitude and displayed little interest in events outside Cambodia. He was self-righteous, and typically rejected compromise or attempts to gain a consensus. Short related that "Pol did believe he was acting for the common good and that sooner or later everyone would recognise that." Chandler noted that Pol Pot displayed "a tendency" towards violence and terror. Short suggested that Pol Pot, along with other senior members of the Khmer Rouge, engaged in the "glorification of violence" and saw bloodshed as a "cause for exultation". This, Short suggested, marked the Khmer Rouge's leadership out as being different from those who led the Chinese and Vietnamese Marxist movements, who tended to see violence as a necessary evil rather than something to embrace joyfully.

Pol Pot wanted his followers to develop a "revolutionary consciousness" that would allow them to act without his guidance and was often disappointed when they failed to display this. Partly because he did not fully trust subordinates he micro-managed events, scrutinising things such as menus for state receptions or the programming schedules for radio broadcasts. Although some of Pol Pot's supporters wanted a personality cult devoted to him akin to those in other Marxist-governed countries, this never successfully emerged in Cambodia. Although some busts and paintings of him were produced during the start of the war with Vietnam, Cambodia never saw songs and plays written about him, his photograph was not included in party literature, and there were no publication of his "thoughts", as had been seen with leaders in countries like China and North Korea. Chandler thought that the proposed personality cult "never became full-blown" in large part because "self-advertisement did not come easily to Pol Pot." It may also have reflected his sincere opposition to individualism.

== Reception and legacy ==
Pol Pot is widely regarded as one of the most brutal despots in modern history, with his regime overseeing mass atrocities that became synonymous with genocide and repression. At the same time, some view him as a revolutionary and transformational figure, seeking to reshape Cambodian society through radical means. Chandler described Pol Pot as one of "the visionary leaders of Cambodian history" for his attempts to radically transform the country. By 1979, his name was internationally recognised as a byword for mass killings and chaos. In its obituary notice for Pol Pot, The New York Times referred to him as the creator of "one of the 20th century's most brutal and radical regimes". Both the BBC News and Time magazine blamed his government for "one of the worst mass killings of the 20th century". In 2009, Deutsche Welle described Pol Pot's government as having initiated one of the "world's most infamous political experiments", while Short referred to the Khmer Rouge as "the most radical revolutionary movement of modern times". Writing for the U.S. socialist magazine Jacobin in 2019, the Dutch socialist Alex de Jong characterised Pol Pot's government as a "genocidal regime" and noted that the name of the Khmer Rouge had become "synonymous with murder and repression". Many Cambodians who lived through his administration later referred to it as samai a-Pot ("the era of the contemptible Pot").

The idea that the deaths which occurred under Pol Pot's government should be considered genocide was first put forward by the Vietnamese government in 1979 after the revelations of the killings committed at Tuol Sleng prison. The Vietnamese-backed PRK administration swiftly opened the prison to visitors as the "Genocide Museum".

Chandler noted that while "Cambodia's revolution" under Pol Pot produced "millions of victims", it also had some beneficiaries. Those who were empowered by the Khmer Rouge administration either "probably believed" Pol Pot's claims regarding the construction of a socialist society or "vigorously pretended that they did", according to Chandler. Chandler also noted that Pol Pot's supporters believed that it was "his clear-sighted strategies and tactics that had wrested control of Cambodia from the United States and its feudal puppets" and that he had "uprooted enemies from the party, encouraged vigilance, built the alliance with China, and masterminded the Four Year Plan." During the war with Vietnam, many Cambodians revered Pol Pot's Khmer Rouge forces as nationalists who were defending the country. Internationally, his movement received support from such countries as China, Thailand, and the United States during that conflict because they saw it as a bulwark against Vietnam and thus Vietnam's key ally, the Soviet Union.

Various groups visited Pol Pot's government while it was in power. The small Canadian Communist League (Marxist–Leninist), for instance, sent a delegation to meet with him in Phnom Penh in December 1978. Another sympathiser who visited Pol Pot that year was the Scottish communist Malcolm Caldwell, an economic historian based at London's School of Oriental and African Studies. He met with Pol Pot, but was murdered shortly afterward; the culprit was never identified. Also in 1978, the Khmer Rouge met with delegates of the Sweden–Kampuchea Friendship Association, whose members openly sympathised with the Khmer Rouge. One of its members, Gunnar Bergström, later noted that in the 1970s he had been a Vietnam war protestor who had become dissatisfied with the Soviet Union and believed that the Cambodian government was building a society based on freedom and equality. In his view, the Khmer Rouge regime was "an example to the Third World". Bergström noted that he and his fellow members had heard about atrocities that were taking place but "did not want to believe them".

=== Cultic activities around Pol Pot's tomb ===
A number of cultic activities and practices have been observed around Pol Pot's grave. People from Anlong Veng, but also from other parts of Cambodia, go to his grave to make offerings of food on certain holy days, including the Festival of the Dead and the Cambodian New Year. Some people make daily offerings of food, as well as more significant offerings such as a pig's head and court music sung by an orchestra. Amanda Pike, an investigative journalist who has visited Cambodia, states that some of Pol Pot's supporters still cling to his memory and ideology and she also states that some fervent believers still worship him. She reports that these people dig through Pol Pot's ashes and snatch up fragments of his bones to take away as talismans. Cambodian villagers say that they dream of Pol Pot and afterwards they win the lottery or become cured from malaria. In addition, people kneel down near his grave and start praying. They chant: "All your children are here, Grandpa. Don't say that we've forgotten you". They ask for good health and for their children to be educated, just like Pol Pot was. When asked about why they go to Pol Pot's grave, some say they knew him personally. Others say that they go to pay their respects to a former leader. Most seem to perceive that some part of the world thinks of Pol Pot in a negative light, however they insist that he was a supporter of the common farmer and a defender of Cambodia. There have also been cases of people claiming to have dreamed of Pol Pot and sleepwalked towards his grave.

== See also ==
- Bibliography of the Cambodian genocide
- Outline of the Cambodian genocide

== Sources cited ==
- Chandler, David P. (1992). Brother Number One: A Political Biography of Pol Pot. Boulder, San Francisco, and Oxford: Westview Press. ISBN 0-8133-0927-1.
- Ciorciari, John D. (2014). "China and the Pol Pot Regime". Cold War History. 14 (2): 215–35. doi:10.1080/14682745.2013.808624. S2CID 153491712.
- Hinton, Alexander Laban (2005). Why Did They Kill: Cambodia in the Shadow of Genocide. University of California Press. ISBN 978-0520241794.
- Kiernan, Ben (2003). "The Demography of Genocide in Southeast Asia: The Death Tolls in Cambodia, 1975–79, and East Timor, 1975–80". Critical Asian Studies. 35 (4): 585–97. doi:10.1080/1467271032000147041. S2CID 143971159.
- Locard, Henri (2005). "State Violence in Democratic Kampuchea (1975–1979) and Retribution (1979–2004)". European Review of History. 12 (1): 121–143. doi:10.1080/13507480500047811. S2CID 144712717.
- Short, Philip (2004). Pol Pot: The History of a Nightmare. London: John Murray. ISBN 978-0719565694.
- Tyner, James A. (2018). From Rice Fields to Killing Fields: Nature, Life, and Labor under the Khmer Rouge. Syracuse, NY: Syracuse University Press. ISBN 978-0815635567.

Political offices
Preceded by Khieu Samphan	Prime Minister of Democratic Kampuchea; 1976–1979	Succeeded by Khieu Samphan
Preceded by None	Director of the Higher Institute of National Defence; 1985–1997	Succeeded by None
Party political offices
Preceded by Tou Samouth	General Secretary of the Communist Party of Kampuchea; 1963–1981	Succeeded by Himself; Party of Democratic Kampuchea
Preceded by Himself; Kampuchean Communist Party	General Secretary of the Party of Democratic Kampuchea; 1981–1985	Succeeded by Khieu Samphan
Military offices
Preceded by ?	Supreme Commander of the National Army of Democratic Kampuchea; 1980–1985	Succeeded by Son Sen
