= Mean Chey (commune) =

Commune in Samlout District, Battambang Province, Cambodia

Mean Chey ឃុំមានជ័យ
- Commune
- Location within Cambodia
- Coordinates: 12°42′26″N 102°45′16″E
- Country: Cambodia
- Province: Battambang Province
- District: Samlout District
- Villages: 6
- Time zone: UTC+07
- Geocode: 020906

Mean Chey (Khmer: ឃុំមានជ័យ) is a khum (commune) of Samlout District in Battambang Province in north-western Cambodia.

== Villages ==
- Sre Sdao
- Kampong Touk
- Sre Chi Pao
- Kam Chat
- Ambib
- Ta Non
