= Nameless Hero =

Nameless Hero, The Nameless Hero or Nameless Heroes may refer to:

- The Nameless Hero, a fictional character in the Gothic (series) game series
- The Nameless Hero, a 2013 children's book by Lee Bacon
- The Nameless Hero, a fictional character in the Piled Higher and Deeper newspaper and webcomic strip
- Unsung Heroes, or Nameless Heroes, a North Korean war drama mini-series 1978–1981
- Nameless Heroes (film), a 1925 German silent film

== See also ==
- Nameless (disambiguation)
- Unsung Heroes (disambiguation)
- The Unknown Warrior
