= Unsong =

Unsong or variation, may refer to:

- Unsong (novel), a science fiction novel by Slate Star Codex blog writer Scott Alexander
- Eun-sung (Korean: 은성; MR: Ŭnsŏng), using McCune–Reischauer romanization; a Korean given name
- Unsongs (album), a 2016 album by Moddi
- "Unsong" (song), a 2000 song by 'Shriekback' off the album Naked Apes and Pond Life
- Tonsan station, a North Korean train station on the Kŭmgol Line, formerly named "Unsong"
- Unsong station, a North Korean train station on the Hambuk Line at the Unsŏng Mines
- Unsong station, a North Korean train station on the Manpo Line at the Unsong Colliery on the Changja River
- Unsong District (Unsong-rodongjagu), Chonchon County, Chagang Province, North Korea
- Unsong Ward (Unsŏng-song), Hungnam District, Hamhung City, South Hamgyŏng Province, North Korea
- Unsong Village (운성리; 雲城里; Unsŏng-ri), Hwangju County, North Hwanghae Province, North Korea
- Unsong Village (운송리; Unsong-ri), Anju City, South P'yŏngan Province, North Korea

== See also ==
- Unsung (disambiguation)
- Song (disambiguation)
- Un (disambiguation)
