= Unsung Heroes (disambiguation) =

Unsung Heroes is a North Korean film series.

Unsung Heroes or Unsung Hero may also refer to:

== Music ==
- Unsung Heroes (Dixie Dregs album), 1981
- Unsung Heroes (Ensiferum album) or the title song, 2012
- "Unsung Hero" (For King & Country song), 2022
- "Unsung Hero" (Terri Clark song)
- "Unsung Hero", a song by Tina Arena from her 1997 album In Deep

== Other uses ==
- Unsung Hero (film), a 2024 Christian drama film
- Unsung Hero (magazine), a 2000–2002 American music magazine
- Song Summoner: The Unsung Heroes, a 2008 iPod video game
- "Unsung Hero", an episode of the series Ruby Gloom

== See also ==
- BBC Sports Unsung Hero Award, a British award for unrecognised contribution in sport
- Unsung (disambiguation)
- Nameless Hero (disambiguation)
