= Prek Sbauv =

Place in Cambodia

Prek Sbauv ព្រែកស្បូវ
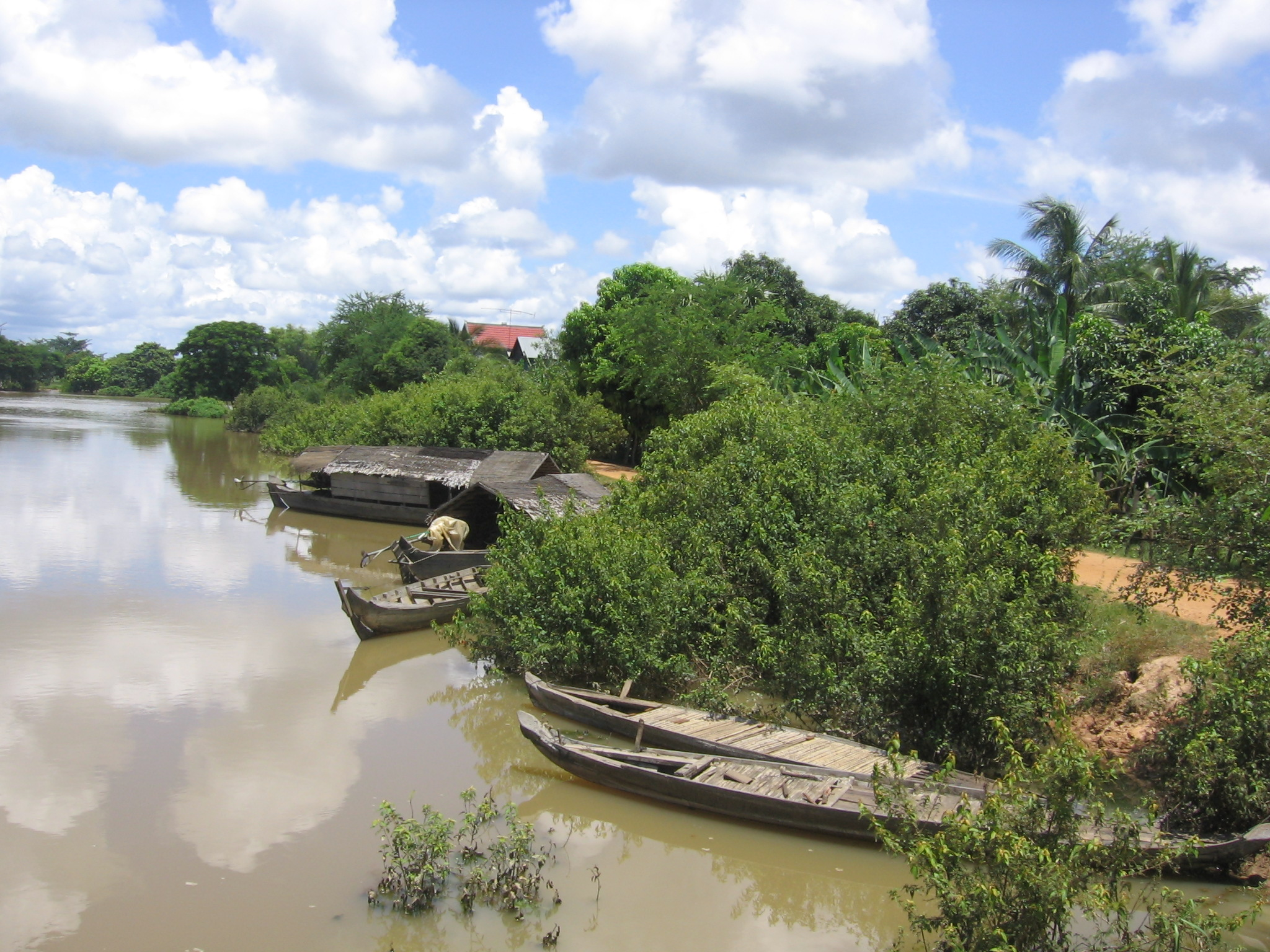
- Pol Pot was born here on May 19, 1925
- Interactive map of Prek Sbauv
- Time zone: UTC+7

Prek Sbauv (Khmer: ព្រែកស្បូវ pronounced [prɛːk.ˈsɓəw]) is a small fishing village alongside the Sen River in north-eastern Cambodia. Known as the birthplace of Pol Pot, notorious leader of the Khmer Rouge, Prek Sbauv has no more than ten houses, and is located in Kampong Thom Province. It is on the central plain of the country. The village is located a few meters to the north-east of Tonlé Sap.

Prek Sbauv is not far from the provincial capital of Kampong Thom. Where the Phnom Penh–Siem Riep Road meet the Sen River's bridge at the center of the city, there is a street at left along the eastern side of the river going to the south. After the Catholic Church of the Province there is a tiny village of fishermen. It is about 1 kilometer away from the Phnom Penh–Siem Riep Road at its south.
