= Ta Taok =

Ta Taok ឃុំតាតោក
- Commune
- Location within Cambodia
- Coordinates: 12°27′52″N 102°48′55″E
- Country: Cambodia
- Province: Battambang Province
- District: Samlout District
- Villages: 9
- Time zone: UTC+07
- Geocode: 020901

Ta Taok is a khum (commune) of Samlout District in Battambang Province in north-western Cambodia.

== Villages ==
- Ou Nonoung
- Ou Kroach
- Ou Traeng
- Peam Ta
- Peam
- Ou Ta Teak
- Ta Tok
- Veal Rolueum
- Phnum Rai
