= Kampong Lpov =

Commune in Samlout District, Battambang Province, Cambodia

Kampong Lpov ឃុំកំពង់ល្ពៅ
- Commune
- Location within Cambodia
- Coordinates: 12°32′14″N 102°56′23″E
- Country: Cambodia
- Province: Battambang Province
- District: Samlout District
- Villages: 9
- Time zone: UTC+07
- Geocode: 020902

Kampong Lpov (Khmer: ឃុំកំពង់ល្ពៅ) is a khum (commune) of Samlout District in Battambang Province in north-western Cambodia.

== Villages ==
- Svay Chrum
- Ou Daem Chek
- Kampong Lpov
- Ou Choam Kandal
- Ou Choam Kraom
- Ou Choam Leu
- Kandal
- Stueng Touch
- Prey Thum
