= Ou Samrel =

Ou Samrel ឃុំអូរសំរិល
- Commune
- Location within Cambodia
- Coordinates: 12°42′29″N 102°57′15″E
- Country: Cambodia
- Province: Battambang Province
- District: Samlout District
- Villages: 6
- Time zone: UTC+07
- Geocode: 020903

Ou Samrel is a khum (commune) of Samlout District in Battambang Province in north-western Cambodia.

== Villages ==
- Ou Rumchek Kraom
- Ou Rumchek Leu
- Chamlang Romeang Kraom
- Chamlang Romeang leu
- Ou Samrael Kraom
- Ou Samrael Leu
