= Sung, Cambodia =

Sung
- Commune
- Location within Cambodia
- Coordinates: 12°33′24″N 102°46′36″E
- Country: Cambodia
- Province: Battambang Province
- District: Samlout District
- Villages: 6
- Time zone: UTC+07
- Geocode: 020904

Sung is a khum (commune) of Samlout District in Battambang Province in north-western Cambodia.

== Villages ==
- Chamkar Chek
- Kandal
- Kanh Chaang
- Sre Reach
- Shoung Muoy
- Shuong Pir
