= Yuncheng (disambiguation) =

Yuncheng (运城市) is a prefecture-level city in Shanxi, People's Republic of China (PRC).

Yuncheng may also refer to:

- Yuncheng County (郓城县), Shandong, PRC
  - Yuncheng Town (郓城镇), town in and seat of said county
- Yuncheng District (云城区), Yunfu, Guangdong, PRC
