= Samlout District =

Samlout សំឡូត Samlot
- District
- Interactive map of Samlout
- Country: Cambodia
- Province: Battambang
- Time zone: UTC+07:00 (ICT)
- Geocode: 0209

Samlout (Khmer: សំឡូត [sɑmˈloːt]) or Samlot is a district (srok) of Battambang Province, in northwestern Cambodia.

== Administration ==
The district is subdivided into 7 communes (khum) and 49 villages (phum). Due to conflict, census enumeration could not be conducted in Samlout district during the 1998 Census.

=== Communes and villages ===
Khum (Communes)	Phum (Villages)
Ta Taok	OU Nonoung, Ou Kroach, Ou Traeng, Peam Ta, Peam, Ou Ta Teak, Ta Tok, Veal Rolueum, Phnum Rai
Kampong Lpou	Svay Chrum, Ou Daem Chek, Kampong Lpov, Ou Choam Kandal, Ou Choam Kraom, Ou Choam Leu, Kandal, Stueng Touch, Prey Thum
Ou Samrel	Ou Rumchek Kraom, Ou Rumchek Leu, Chamlang Romeang Kraom, Chamlang Romeang leu, Ou Samrael Kraom, Ou Samrael Leu
Sung	Chamkar Chek, Kandal, Kanh Chaang, Sre Reach, Shoung Muoy, Shuong Pir
Samlout	Chhar RoKar, Kantuot, Ou Chrab, Samlout, Srae Andoung Muy, Bueng Run
Mean Chey	Sre Sdao, Kampong Touk, Sre Chi Pao, Kam Chat, Ambib, Ta Non
Ta Sanh	Anlong Pouk, Doun Troek, Ou Sngout, Ou Tontim, Prey Rumchek, Ta Sanh Khang Chhueng, Ta Sanh Khang Tboang

== Development efforts ==
In 2021, Angelina Jolie told People Magazine that she plans to return to Cambodia to establish the next “Women for Bees” program in the Samlout region to raise awareness of conservation efforts. Women for Bees aims to train 50 women beekeepers within five years and build 2,500 hives in 25 UNESCO biosphere reserves around the world, including Cambodia.
