= Ta Sanh =

Coordinates: 12°36′N 102°51′E

Ta Sanh ឃុំតាសាញ
- Commune
- Interactive map of Ta Sanh
- Country: Cambodia
- Province: Battambang Province
- District: Samlout District
- Villages: 7
- Time zone: UTC+07

Ta Sanh is a khum (commune) of Samlout District in Battambang Province in north-western Cambodia.

== Villages ==
- Anlong Pouk
- Doun Trit
- Ou Sngout
- Ou Tontim
- Prey Rumchek
- Ta Sanh Khang Chhueng
- Ta Sanh Khang Tboang
