= Eun-sung =

- Hangul: 은성
- RR: Eunseong
- MR: Ŭnsŏng
- IPA: [ɯnsʌŋ]

Eun-sung, also spelled Eun-seong or Un-sung, is a Korean given name.

People with this name include:

- Choi Eun-sung (born 1971), South Korean football player
- Hong Eun-seong (born 1983), South Korean field hockey player
- Eunseong Kim (born 1971), South Korean physicist
- Lee Eun-sung (born 1988), South Korean actress
- Ji Eun-sung (born 1991), South Korean actor

Fictional characters with this name include:

- Go Eun-seong, in the 2009 South Korean television series Brilliant Legacy
- Ji Eun-sung, in the 2004 South Korean film He Was Cool
- Cha Eun-seong, in the 2016 South Korean television series Marriage Contract

== See also ==
- List of Korean given names
