= Kalyanee Mam =

Filmmaker

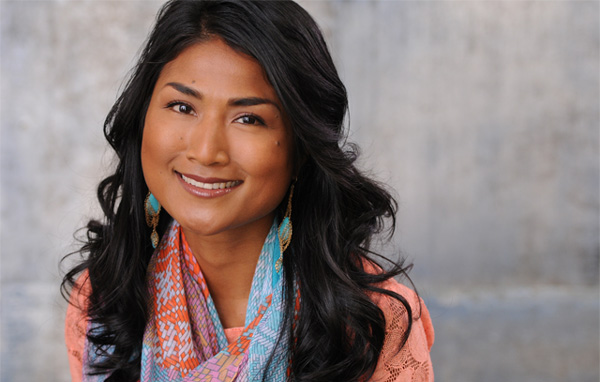

Kalyanee Mam (Khmer: ម៉ម កល្យាណី; born 1977) is a filmmaker whose film, A River Changes Course, which she directed and produced, has won several awards, including the Grand Jury Award for World Cinema Documentary at the 2013 Sundance Film Festival and the Golden Gate Award for Best Documentary Feature at the 2013 San Francisco International Film Festival.

== Early life ==
Mam was born in Battambang, Kampuchea during the Khmer Rouge regime, to Vann Theth Mam and Sok Sann Mam. She is the fifth of seven children and the fourth of four girls. Mam's parents had eloped from Prey Veng Province and settled in Pailin when the Khmer Rouge came to power in April 1975. They were evacuated to Battambang Province and her family members immediately divided and forced to labor in separate work camps.

Mam and her family attempted to escape the Khmer Rouge camps twelve times, each time failing until the Khmer Rouge fell from power in January 1979, when she and her family finally escaped through forests and landmines to Kao-I-Dang, a refugee camp at the Thai-Cambodian border.

Through the passage of the Indochina Migration and Refugee Assistance Act and with the assistance of the International Rescue Committee, Mam and her family resettled in Houston, TX in 1981 before finally relocating to Stockton, CA, a city in northern San Joaquin Valley known for its large Cambodian population. In Stockton, Mam's father worked as a caseworker assisting South East Asian refugee youth within the juvenile justice system. Mam's mother continued to support her family as a homemaker, raising seven children. Mam received a full scholarship to attend Yale University. Inspired by her family's history and motivated to learn more about her Cambodian identity, Mam volunteered at the Yale Cambodian Genocide Program with Professor Ben Kiernan, who became her senior thesis advisor. In summer 1998, Mam returned to Cambodia for the first time since she and her family fled the country seventeen years earlier. Mam spent the summer as a research intern at the Documentation Center of Cambodia, led by Executive Director Youk Chhang, and interviewed subjects throughout Cambodia for her senior thesis on "The Endurance of the Cambodian Family Under the Khmer Rouge Regime." The paper was published in an anthology Genocide in Cambodia and Rwanda: New Perspectives. After graduating from Yale, Mam received a Charles P. Howland Fellowship to conduct research on "Crimes Committed Against Women During the Khmer Rouge Regime". Interviews gathered from her research are currently being used in the Cambodian Tribunal to try the most responsible leaders of the Khmer Rouge.Legal career

Mam went on to study law at UCLA School of Law, with a special focus on immigration and refugee law. During law school, Mam worked with International Bridges to Justice at the National Legal Aid Center in Beijing, China, the Refugee Law Clinic at the University of Witswatersand in Johannesburg, South Africa, and the Asian Pacific American Legal Center, where she assisted immigrant victims of domestic violence file for permanent residence status in the United States under the Violence Against Women Act.

After graduating from law school, she worked for two years with a legal consulting firm in Maputo, Mozambique and then spent six months working with USAID and the Ministry of Justice (Iraq). While working in Iraq, Mam secretly conducted interviews of her Iraqi colleagues in her bedroom and documented their life stories under the Saddam Hussein regime, the Sanctions against Iraq.

== Film career ==
Inspired by her work in Iraq and the plight of her Iraqi colleagues who were seeking refugee status abroad, Mam partnered with David Mendez to produce a documentary short about the dreams and struggles of three young Iraqi refugee artists living in Syria, Jordan, and Egypt. The documentary won Best Directing-Short Documentary at the Los Angeles International Film Festival and a prize for Artistic Merit at the Montana CINE International Film Festival, and was an official selection at the St. Louis International Film Festival.

However, Kalyanee Mam is best known for directing and producing award-winning documentary A River Changes Course, which explores the damage rapid development has wrought in her native Cambodia on both a human and environmental level. Mam was first inspired to make the film when traveling to Cambodia in October 2008, exactly ten years after her first trip to Cambodia. She noticed a dramatic change in the country's landscape – many of the forests she had traveled to before had been cut down and replaced with rubber plantations, huge lakes in Phnom Penh were dredged and filled with sand to accommodate condominiums and business infrastructure projects, and hundreds of garment factories sprouted outside the city where once were rice fields and towering palm trees. On this trip, Mam also first met Sari Math, who recounted the story of his family and their struggle to survive in a fishing village on the Tonle Sap. During this first meeting, Mam knew she wanted to tell Sari's story and the story of other Cambodians impacted by development.

A River Changes Course premiered at the 2013 Sundance Film Festival on January 21, 2013. The film is currently screening at top festivals including The San Francisco International Film Festival, Full Frame Documentary Film Festivall, Seattle International Film Festival, The Los Angeles Asian Pacific Film Festival, Environmental Film Festival in the Nation's Capital, Environmental Film Festival at Yale, RiverRun International Film Festival, Atlanta Film Festival, Nashville Film Festival, Green Film Festival in Seoul, Docville International Documentary Film Festival, Lincoln Film Society - Season Of Cambodia, The Museum of Modern Art ContlmporAsian Film Program, Sydney Film Festival, Biografilm Festival, Jerusalem Film Festival, DocFest Munich, and many more prior to theatrical release in October 2013 and broadcasts worldwide.

Mam is also known for her work with director Charles Ferguson as Cinematographer, Associate Producer, and Researcher for 2011 Academy Award-winning documentary Inside Job, a Sony Pictures Classics release about the 2008 financial crisis, hailed as a "masterpiece of investigative non-fiction moviemaking" and which premiered at the 2010 Cannes Film Festival.

== Filmography ==
- A River Changes Course (2013) 83 minutes
- Inside Job (2010) 105 minutes
- Between Earth & Sky (2009) 30 minutes

== Film awards ==
A River Changes Course

- Grand Jury Prize for World Cinema Documentary - 2013 Sundance Film Festival
- Golden Gate Award for Best Documentary Feature - 2013 San Francisco International Film Festival
- Two Special Jury Prizes for Best Director and Best Cinematography - 2013 Los Angeles Asian Pacific Film Festival
- Center for Documentary Studies Filmmaker Award - 2013 Full Frame Documentary Film Festival
- Grand Jury Prize for Best Feature - 2013 Atlanta Film Festival
- Grand Jury Prize for Best Feature - 2013 Environmental Film Festival at Yale
- Human Rights Award - 2013 River Run Film Festival
- Grand Jury Prize for Best Documentary Feature - 2013 Green Film Festival in Seoul
- Grand Jury Conscience Award - 2013 Docville International Documentary Film Festival

Between Earth & Sky

- Best Directing-Short Documentary at the Los Angeles International Film Festival.
- Prize for Artistic Merit at the Montana CINE International Film Festival.
