= A History of Democratic Kampuchea (1975–1979) =

Cambodian textbook written by Khamboly, Dy

- Author: Khamboly Dy
- Language: Khmer/English
- Subject: History of Cambodia
- Published: 2007
- Publication place: Cambodia
- Pages: 87
- ISBN: 978-99950-60-04-6

A History of Democratic Kampuchea (1975–1979) (Khmer: ប្រវត្តិសាស្ត្រកម្ពុជាប្រជាធិបតេយ្យ (១៩៧៥-១៩៧៩)) is a 2007 Cambodian textbook written by Khamboly Dy. The 87-page textbook was commissioned by the Documentation Center of Cambodia (DC-Cam), with Dy becoming the first Cambodian to write a textbook about the period. Youk Chhang, then the Director of DC-Cam, supervised the project, while Wynne Cougill acted as both adviser and editor and American historian David P. Chandler acted as reviewer of the text. The book was published by DC-Cam five years after it began to advocate the inclusion of Khmer Rouge history to Cambodian school curriculum.

Until the book's publication, the Khmer Rouge period of Cambodian history had rarely been taught in Cambodian schools after the United Nations forced its removal from the general curriculum in the early 1990s, so as to encourage Khmer Rouge officials to join its talks for democracy. The book is now considered the definitive schoolbook on the four-year Khmer Rouge period of Cambodian history, and has been made mandatory in Cambodian high school education beginning in 2009.
