= Youk Chhang =

Cambodian director and Khmer Rouge survivor

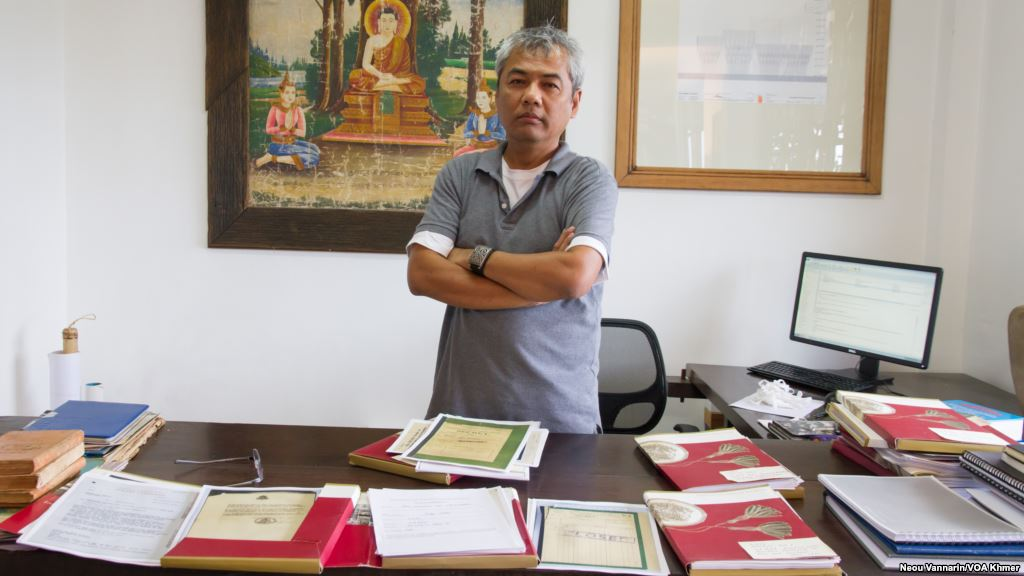
Youk Chhang in 2015.

Youk Chhang (Khmer: ឆាំង យុ; born 22 January 1961) is the executive director of the Documentation Center of Cambodia (DC-Cam) and a survivor of the Khmer Rouge's killing fields. He became DC-Cam's leader in 1995, when the center was founded as a field office of Yale University’s Cambodian Genocide Program to conduct research, training and documentation relating to the Khmer Rouge regime. Chhang continued to run the center after its inception as an independent Cambodian non-governmental organization in 1997 and is currently building on DC-Cam's work to establish the Sleuk Rith Institute, a permanent hub for genocide studies in Asia, based in Phnom Penh.

== Early life ==
Chhang was born on 22 January 1961 in Tuol Kouk District, Phnom Penh, Cambodia. He was the youngest of nine children. His father was a gem merchant. On 17 April 1975, the day of the fall of Phnom Penh, Chhang was alone at home, and was separated from his family in the subsequent Khmer Rouge-ordered evacuation of the city. He walked to Takeo Province, knowing that his mother's home village was somewhere in the vicinity of Phnom Chisor. Villagers there sheltered him until his mother's arrival, without alerting the Khmer Rouge village chief to his presence, but after his mother's arrival, he and his family members were sent to a work camp in the country's northwest, in what is today Banteay Meanchey Province. After the Vietnamese invasion of Cambodia, he returned to Phnom Penh, but then, at his mother's urging, fled Cambodia and sneaked into neighbouring Thailand. He lived at the Khao-I-Dang refugee camp for several years until 1985 when he was chosen for resettlement in the United States, and after some time living at an orientation and training camp in the Philippines, he arrived in the United States in 1986.

== Human rights work ==
Before leading DC-Cam, Chhang managed human rights and democracy training programs in Cambodia for the U.S.-based International Republican Institute and was an international staff member assisting the Electoral Component of the United Nations Transitional Authority in Cambodia (UNTAC). From 1989 to 1992, he worked on crime prevention in Dallas, Texas. Chhang is a senior research fellow at the Center for the Study of Genocide, Conflict Resolution, and Human Rights at Rutgers University-Newark. He was a member of the eminent persons group who founded the Institute for International Criminal Investigations in The Hague in 2003. He is also a Board Trustee of Air Asia.

Chhang is the author of several articles and book chapters on Cambodia's quest for memory and justice and is the co-editor of Cambodia’s Hidden Scars: Trauma Psychology in the Wake of the Khmer Rouge (2011).

== Awards ==
Chhang was the executive producer of a documentary film entitled A River Changes Course (2012), known as Kbang Tik Tonle in Khmer, about the changing social, economic, and environmental landscape in Cambodia. Among other awards, that film won the 2013 World Cinema Grand Jury Prize for documentaries at the Sundance Film Festival. He received the Truman-Reagan Freedom Award from the Victims of Communism Memorial Foundation in Washington, DC in 2000. He was named one of Time magazine's "60 Asian heroes" in 2006 and one of the "Time 100" most influential people in the world in 2007 for his stand against impunity in Cambodia and elsewhere.

Chhang was awarded the Center for Justice and Accountability's Judith Lee Stronach Human Rights Award in 2017. was one of six people who received the Ramon Magsaysay Award in 2018.
