= Khmer Rouge =

Members of the Communist Party of Kampuchea

- ខ្មែរក្រហម
- The flag of Democratic Kampuchea, whose design was used by Khmer guerrillas since the 1950s with the building design varying
- Founder: Tou Samouth (1960–1962)
- Leader: Pol Pot
- Military leader: Pol Pot (?–1985 or 1992); Khieu Samphan (1980–1998); Ta Mok (1997–1999)
- Dates active: 28 June 1951 – 9 February 1999: 1951–1968 (political party); 1968–1975 (insurgency); 1975–1979 (government); 1979–1982 (Government-in-Exile); 1982–1992 (Coalition Government-in-Exile); 1992–1994 (Insurgency); 1994–1998 (rival government); 1998–1999 (insurgency)
- Headquarters: Phnom Penh, Cambodia
- Ideology: Pol Pot Thought; Autarky; Communism; Khmer ultranationalism; Anti-Vietnamese sentiment
- Political position: Far-left

Khmer Rouge (Note: /kəˌmɛər ˈruːʒ/; French: [kmɛʁ ʁuʒ]; Khmer: ខ្មែរក្រហម, romanized: Khmae Krâhâm, lit. 'Red Khmer' [kʰmae krɑːhɑːm]) is the name that was popularly given to members of the Communist Party of Kampuchea (CPK), and by extension to Democratic Kampuchea, which ruled Cambodia between 1975 and 1979. The name was coined in the 1960s by Norodom Sihanouk to describe his country's heterogeneous, communist-led dissidents, with whom he allied after the 1970 Cambodian coup d'état.

The Kampuchea Revolutionary Army was slowly built up in the forests of eastern Cambodia during the late 1960s, supported by the People's Army of Vietnam, the Viet Cong, the Pathet Lao, and the Chinese Communist Party (CCP). Although the Khmer Rouge originally fought against Sihanouk, it changed its position on the CCP's advice and began supporting him after he was overthrown in a 1970 coup d'état by Lon Nol, who established the pro-American Khmer Republic. Despite a massive American bombing campaign (Operation Freedom Deal) against them, the Khmer Rouge won the Cambodian Civil War when they captured the Cambodian capital and overthrew the Khmer Republic in 1975. Following their victory, the Khmer Rouge—who were led by Pol Pot, Nuon Chea, Ieng Sary, Son Sen, and Khieu Samphan—immediately set about forcibly evacuating the country's major cities. In 1976, they renamed the country Democratic Kampuchea.

The Khmer Rouge regime was highly autocratic, totalitarian, and repressive. Many deaths resulted from the regime's social engineering policies and the "Moha Lout Plaoh", an imitation of China's Great Leap Forward which had caused the Great Chinese Famine. The Khmer Rouge's attempts at agricultural reform through collectivization similarly led to widespread famine, while its insistence on absolute self-sufficiency, including the supply of medicine, led to the death of many thousands from treatable diseases, such as malaria.

The Khmer Rouge regime murdered hundreds of thousands of their perceived political opponents, and their racist emphasis on national purity resulted in the genocide of Cambodian minorities. Its cadres summarily executed and tortured perceived subversive elements, or they killed them during genocidal purges of their own ranks between 1975 and 1979. Ultimately, the Cambodian genocide which took place under the Khmer Rouge regime led to the deaths of 1.5 to 2 million people, around 25% of Cambodia's population.

In the 1970s, the Khmer Rouge was largely supported and funded by the CCP, receiving approval from CCP Chairman Mao Zedong; it is estimated that at least 90% of the foreign aid which was provided to the Khmer Rouge came from China. (Note: See:) The regime was removed from power in 1979 when Vietnam invaded Cambodia and quickly destroyed most of its forces. The Khmer Rouge then fled to Thailand, whose government saw them as a buffer force against the Communist Party of Vietnam (CPV). The Khmer Rouge continued to fight against the Vietnamese and the government of the new People's Republic of Kampuchea until the end of the war in 1989. The Cambodian governments-in-exile (including the Khmer Rouge) held onto Cambodia's United Nations seat (with considerable international support) until 1993, when the monarchy was restored and the name of the Cambodian state was changed to the Kingdom of Cambodia. A year later, thousands of Khmer Rouge guerrillas surrendered themselves in a government amnesty.

In 1996, a new political party called the Democratic National Union Movement was formed by Ieng Sary, who was granted amnesty despite his role as the deputy leader of the Khmer Rouge, in exchange for his defection and his role in persuading other Khmer Rouge fighters to surrender. This move helped to further dissolve the Khmer Rouge and was a calculated political decision to end the ongoing civil war by incorporating former resistance leaders. The Khmer Rouge was largely dissolved by the mid-1990s and finally surrendered completely in 1999. Sary was arrested in 2007 and was charged with crimes against humanity but died of heart failure before the case against him could be brought to a verdict. In 2014, two Khmer Rouge leaders, Nuon Chea and Khieu Samphan, were jailed for life by the United Nations-backed Extraordinary Chambers in the Courts of Cambodia, which found them guilty of crimes against humanity for their roles in the Khmer Rouge's genocidal campaign.

== Etymology ==
The term Khmers rouges, French for red Khmers, was coined by King Norodom Sihanouk and it was later adopted by English speakers (in the form of the corrupted version Khmer Rouge). It was used to refer to a succession of communist parties in Cambodia which evolved into the Communist Party of Kampuchea and later the Party of Democratic Kampuchea. Its military was known successively as the Kampuchean Revolutionary Army and the National Army of Democratic Kampuchea.

Since the deterioration in relations between Vietnam and Democratic Kampuchea, the Vietnamese government no longer recognize the legitimacy of the Khmer Rouge, and as a result, they call the Khmer Rouge the Pol Pot-Ieng Sary clique (Vietnamese: Tập đoàn Pol Pot-Ieng Sary) or the Pol Pot-Ieng Sary reactionary clique (Vietnamese: Tập đoàn phản động Pol Pot-Ieng Sary).

== Ideology ==
=== Influence of Communist thought ===
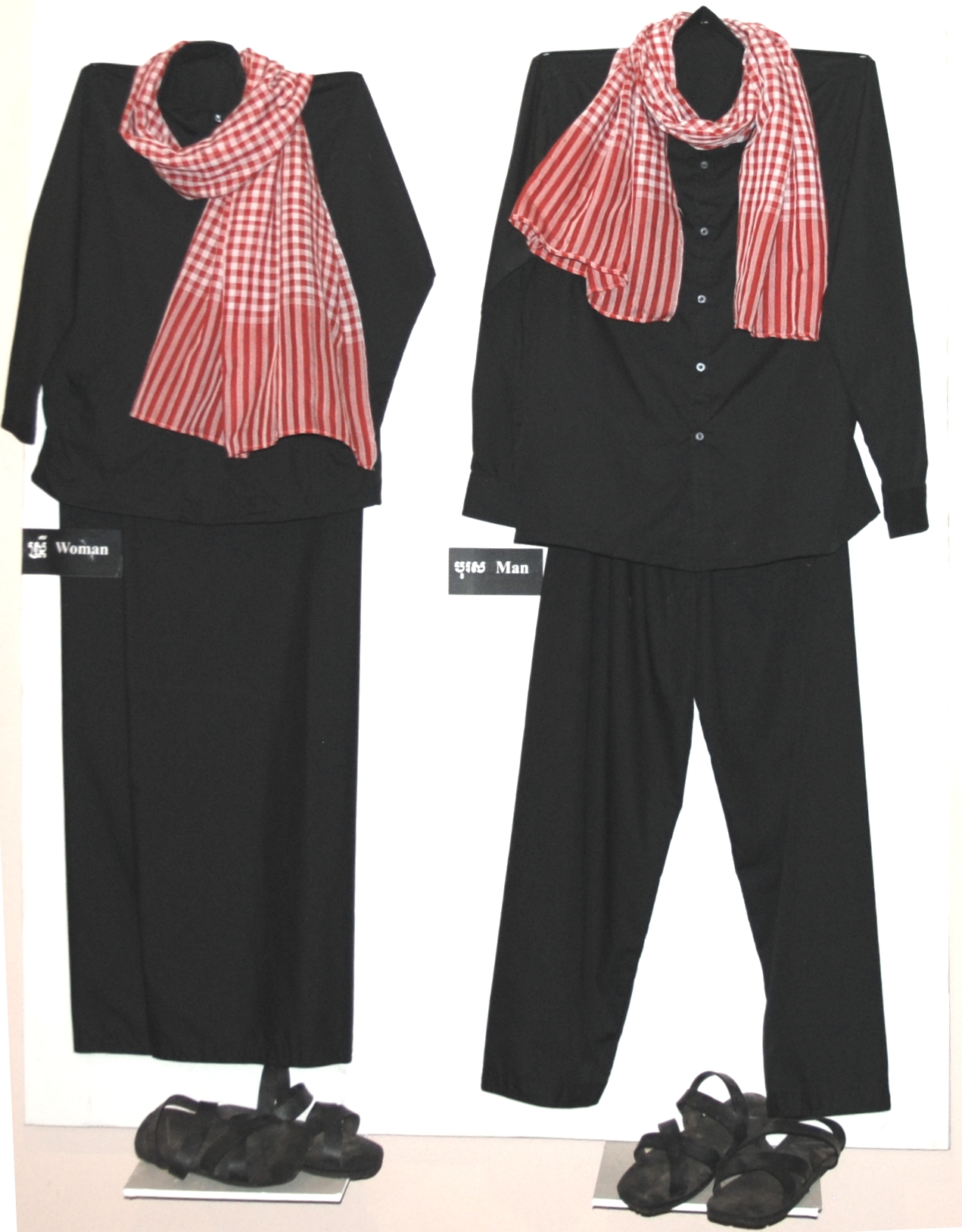
Khmer Rouge clothing, consisting of a red krama, a black pajama-style outfit and sandals made of tires.

The movement's ideology was shaped by a power struggle during 1976 in which the so-called Party Centre, which was led by Pol Pot, the general secretary of the Communist Party of Kampuchea, defeated other regional elements of its leadership. The Party Centre's ideology combined elements of communism with a strongly xenophobic form of Khmer nationalism. Partly because of its secrecy and partly because of changes in how it presented itself, academic interpretations of its political position vary widely, ranging from interpreting it as the "purest" Marxist–Leninist movement to characterising it as an anti-Marxist "peasant revolution". The first interpretation has been criticized by historian Ben Kiernan, who asserts that it comes from a "convenient anti-communist perspective". Its leaders and theorists, most of whom had been exposed to the heavily Stalinist outlook of the French Communist Party during the 1950s, developed a distinctive and eclectic "post-Leninist" ideology that drew on elements of Stalinism, Maoism and the postcolonial theory of Frantz Fanon. In the early 1970s, the Khmer Rouge looked to the model of Enver Hoxha's Albania, which they believed was the most advanced communist state which was then in existence.

Many of the regime's characteristics—such as its focus on the rural peasantry rather than the urban proletariat as the bulwark of revolution, its emphasis on Great Leap Forward-type initiatives, its desire to abolish personal interest in human behaviour, its promotion of communal living and eating, and its focus on perceived common sense over technical knowledge—appear to have been heavily influenced by Maoist ideology; however, the Khmer Rouge displayed these characteristics in a more extreme form. Additionally, non-Khmers, who constituted a significant part of the supposedly favored segment of the peasantry, were singled out because of their race. According to Ben Kiernan, this was "neither a communist proletarian revolution that privileged the working class, nor a peasant revolution that favored all farmers".

While the CPK described itself as the "number 1 Communist state" once it was in power, some communist regimes, such as Vietnam, saw it as a Maoist deviation from orthodox Marxism. According to author Rebecca Gidley, the Khmer Rouge "almost immediately erred by implementing a Maoist doctrine rather than following the Marxist–Leninist prescriptions." The Maoist and Khmer Rouge belief that human willpower could overcome material and historical conditions was strongly at odds with mainstream Marxism, which emphasised historical materialism and the idea of history as inevitable progression toward communism. In 1981, following the Cambodian–Vietnamese War, in an attempt to get foreign support, the Khmer Rouge officially renounced communism.

=== Khmer nationalism ===
One of the regime's main characteristics was its form of Khmer nationalism, which combined an idealisation of the Khmer Empire (802–1431) and the late Middle Period of Cambodian history (1431–1863) with an existential fear for the survival of the Cambodian state, which had historically been liquidated during periods of Vietnamese and Siamese intervention. The spillover of Vietnamese fighters during the Vietnamese–American War intensified anti-Vietnamese sentiments: the Khmer Republic under Lon Nol, overthrown by the Khmer Rouge, had promoted Mon-Khmer nationalism and it was also responsible for several anti-Vietnamese pogroms which occurred during the 1970s. Some historians such as Ben Kiernan have stated that the importance which the regime gave to race overshadowed its conceptions of class.

The Khmer Rouge targeted particular groups of people, among them Buddhist monks, ethnic minorities, and educated elites. Once they were in power, the Khmer Rouge explicitly targeted the Chinese, the Vietnamese, the Cham minority and even their partially Khmer offspring. The same attitude extended to the party's own ranks, as senior CPK figures of non-Khmer ethnicity were removed from the leadership despite extensive revolutionary experience and were often killed.

A Vietnamese official called the Khmer Rouge leaders "Hitlerite-fascists", while the General Secretary of the Kampuchean People's Revolutionary Party, Pen Sovan, referred to the Khmer Rouge as a "draconian, dictatorial and fascist regime".

=== Economy ===
The goal of Khmer Rouge was to create a communist society through the complete and immediate abolition of money, trade and private property. The new society was to be perfectly egalitarian, which required homogeneity, which Khmer Rouge sought to achieve through the destruction of existing social structures and the uniformisation of the newly emerging socialist society. To this end, the creation of a "new society" that would completely break with the existing traditions and cultural heritage of Cambodia was also considered necessary. One of the Khmer Rouge activists stated: "We must burn the old grass so that new grass can grow." For Khmer Rouge, egalitarianism also included the concept of "levelling down"—Cambodian society was to be brought to the level of the rural poor and develop from there; anything that was inaccessible to the general public was considered bourgeois and a luxury that had to be destroyed.

Pol Pot’s economic policies under the Khmer Rouge (1975–1979) were characterized by an extreme form of agrarian socialism that sought to eliminate markets, money, and private property. The regime aimed to transform Cambodia into a self-sufficient, classless society based entirely on collective agriculture. Urban populations were forcibly relocated to rural communes, where the state controlled production and distribution. This system rejected industrialization, diverging from other communist models that incorporated industrial development. The abolition of money and markets disrupted traditional economic coordination, leading to inefficiencies, shortages, and declining agricultural output. Collective land policies further reduced individual incentives and contributed to mismanagement of resources. Long-term effects included significant demographic and economic consequences, including reduced human capital and persistent institutional challenges. These policies are widely regarded as a major factor in Cambodia’s economic collapse during this period.

The leading economic theorist of Khmer Rouge, Hou Yuon, distinguished two types of economic systems: "natural" (natural economy) and "commodity" (trade-based); in the agricultural conditions of Cambodia, the "commodity" economy was considered a parasite on the "natural" economy—according to Youn's calculations, rice producers received only 26% of the profits. This formed the basis of Khmer Rouge's hostility towards cities, as urban areas were seen as playing a parasitic role in the pre-industrial society of Cambodia, and even the urban working class was considered a relatively privileged group. Khmer Rouge instead postulated socialism built on agrarianism—the poorest peasants, organized into production cooperatives, were considered the main and in fact the only force of the revolution; one of the Khmer Rouge's slogans was "agriculture is the basis for further industrial expansion"—the economy was to be based on agriculture, with the development of industry postponed for the future. The Cambodian economy was also supposed to be self-sufficient along the principle of "reliance on one's own strength", which Khmer Rouge considered necessary to ensure the independence of the Cambodian revolution from imperialism and neo-colonialism, even if this entailed technological regression.

=== Autarky ===
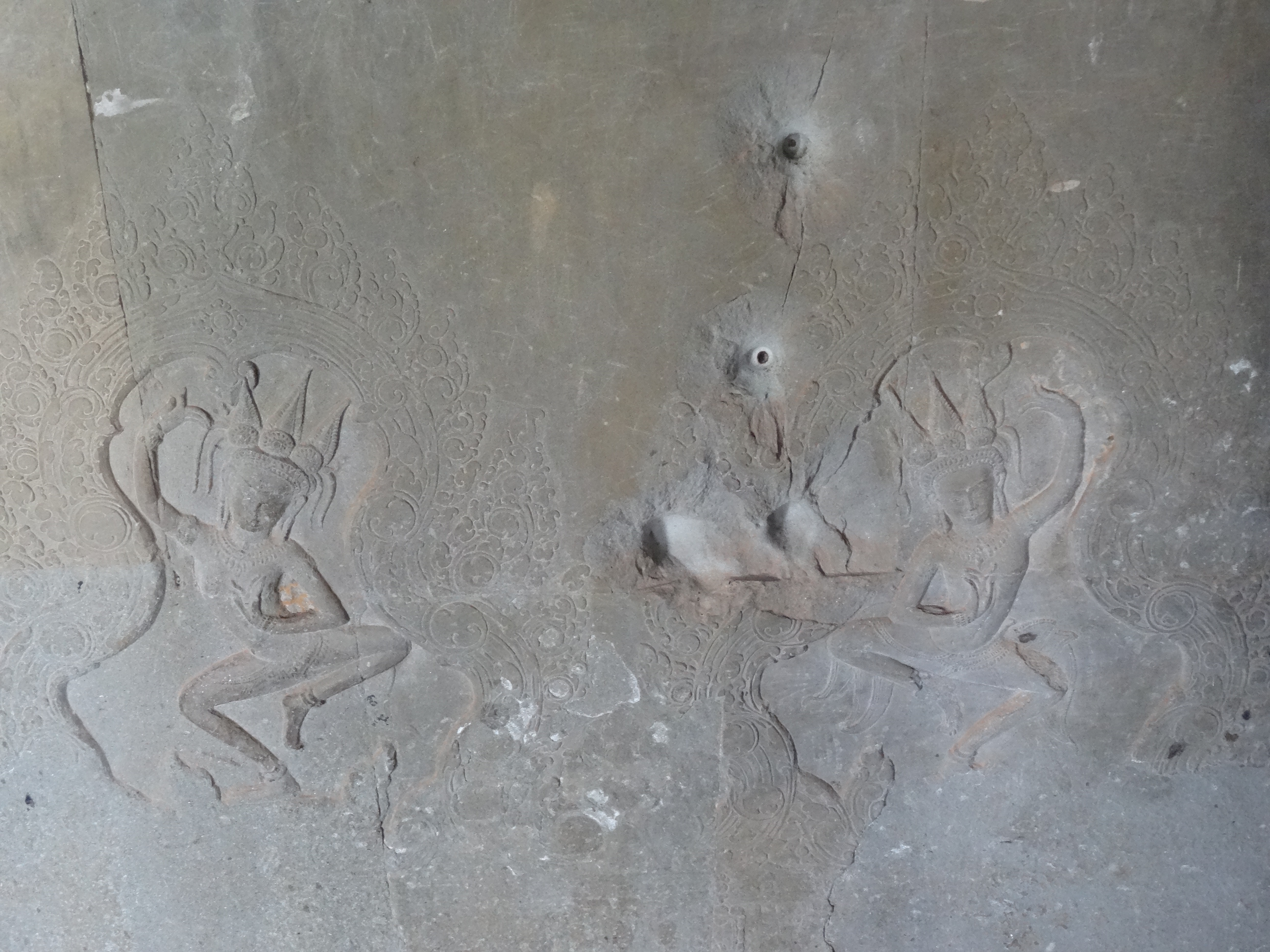
Khmer Rouge bullet holes left at Angkor Wat temple

The Khmer Rouge's economic policy, which was largely based on the plans of Khieu Samphan, focused on the achievement of national self-reliance through an initial phase of agricultural collectivism. This would then be used as a route to achieve rapid social transformation and industrial and technological development without assistance from foreign powers, a process which the party characterised as a "Super Great Leap Forward".

The party's General Secretary Pol Pot strongly influenced the propagation of the policy of autarky. He was reportedly impressed with the self-sufficient manner in which the mountain tribes of Cambodia lived, which the party believed was a form of primitive communism. Khmer Rouge theory developed the concept that the nation should take "agriculture as the basic factor and use the fruits of agriculture to build industry". In 1975, Khmer Rouge representatives to China said that Pol Pot's belief was that the collectivisation of agriculture was capable of "[creating] a complete communist society without wasting time on the intermediate steps". Society was accordingly classified into peasant "base people" (ប្រជាជនមូលដ្ឋាន prâchéachôn mulôdthan), who would be the bulwark of the transformation; and urban "new people" (ប្រជាជនថ្មី prâchéachôn thmei), who were to be reeducated or liquidated. The focus of the Khmer Rouge leadership on the peasantry as the base of the revolution was according to Michael Vickery a product of their status as "petty-bourgeois radicals who had been overcome by peasantist romanticism". The opposition of the peasantry and the urban population in Khmer Rouge ideology was heightened by the structure of the Cambodian rural economy, where small farmers and peasants had historically suffered from indebtedness to urban money-lenders rather than suffering from indebtedness to landlords. The policy of evacuating major towns, as well as providing a reserve of easily exploitable agricultural labour, was likely viewed positively by the Khmer Rouge's peasant supporters as removing the source of their debts.

=== Relationship to religion ===
Democratic Kampuchea was an atheist state, although its constitution stated that everyone had freedom of religion, or freedom not to practice a religion. However, it specified that what it termed "reactionary religion" would not be permitted. While in practice religious activity was not tolerated, the relationship of the CPK to the majority Cambodian Theravada Buddhism was complex; several key figures in its history, such as Tou Samouth and Ta Mok, were former monks, along with many lower level cadres, who often proved to be some of the strictest disciplinarians. While there was extreme harassment of Buddhist institutions, the CPK regime had a tendency to internalise and reconfigure the symbolism and language of Cambodian Buddhism so that many revolutionary slogans mimicked the formulae which were learned by young monks during their training. Some cadres who had previously been monks interpreted their change of vocation as a simple movement from a lower to a higher religion, mirroring attitudes around the growth of Cao Dai in the 1920s.

Buddhist laity were seemingly not singled out for persecution, but the traditional belief in the tutelary spirits, or the neak ta, rapidly eroded as people were forcibly moved from their home areas. The position with Buddhist monks was more complicated: as with Islam, many religious leaders were killed whereas many ordinary monks were sent to remote monasteries where they were subjected to hard physical labour. The same division between rural and urban populations was seen in the regime's treatment of monks. For instance, those from urban monasteries were classified as "new monks" and sent to rural areas to live alongside "base monks" of peasant background, who were classified as "proper and revolutionary". Monks were not ordered to defrock until as late as 1977 in Kratié Province, where many monks found that they reverted to the status of lay peasantry as the agricultural work they were allocated to involved regular breaches of monastic rules. While there is evidence of widespread vandalism of Buddhist monasteries, many more than were initially thought survived the Khmer Rouge years in fair condition, as did most Khmer historical monuments, and it is possible that stories of their near-total destruction were propaganda issued by the successor People's Republic of Kampuchea. Nevertheless, it has been estimated that nearly 25,000 Buddhist monks were killed by the regime.

The repression of Islam (practised by the country's Cham minority) was extensive. Islamic religious leaders were executed, but some Cham Muslims were probably told that they could continue to perform their devotions in private as long as it did not interfere with work quotas. Mat Ly, a Cham who served as the deputy minister of agriculture under the People's Republic of Kampuchea, stated that Khmer Rouge troops had perpetrated a number of massacres in Cham villages in the Central and Eastern zones where the residents had refused to give up Islamic customs. While François Ponchaud stated that Christians were invariably taken away and killed based on the accusation that they had links to the U.S. Central Intelligence Agency, however, at least some cadres appear to have regarded it as preferable to the "feudal" class-based religion of Buddhism. Nevertheless, it remained deeply suspect to the regime thanks to its close links to French colonialism; Phnom Penh cathedral was razed along with other places of worship.

=== Interpretations ===
Scholars analyze the history of the Khmer Rouge regime by placing it within a historical context. The Khmer Rouge came to power in 1975 at the end of the Cambodian Civil War, a conflict in which the United States had supported the opposing regime of Lon Nol by heavily bombing Cambodian territory, primarily targeting communist Vietnamese troops who were allied with the Khmer Rouge, but it gave the Khmer Rouge's leadership a justification for its elimination of the pro-Vietnamese faction within the group. The Cambodian genocide was stopped with the Khmer Rouge's overthrow in 1979 by Communist Vietnam. There have been allegations of United States support for the Khmer Rouge following their overthrow; in September 1979, the United Nations General Assembly voted to continue recognising Pol Pot's Democratic Kampuchea. Communism in South East Asia was deeply divided, as China supported the Khmer Rouge, while the Soviet Union and Vietnam opposed it.

There are three interpretations of the ideology of the Khmer Rouge: totalitarianism, revisionism, and postrevisionism. Historian Ben Kiernan describes their rule as totalitarian but places it within the context of "xenophobic European nationalism", from which came their agrarianism and the establishment of a Great Cambodia, rather than communism or Marxism. Pol Pot's biographers David P. Chandler and Philip Short place more emphasis on their ideological heritage of communism; it was not easy to apply Karl Marx and Vladimir Lenin's ideas to Cambodia, and communism was chosen as a way to get rid of French colonialism and transform the feudal society. Another interpretation, as proposed by historian Michael Vickery, is that of a bottom-up, left-wing peasant revolution with the Khmer Rouge as the revolutionaries. The Khmer Rouge was an intellectual group with a middle-class background and a romanticised sympathy for rural poor people but with little to no awareness that their radical policies would lead to such violence; according to this view, the applicability of genocide is rejected and the violence was an unintentional consequence that was beyond the Khmer Rouge's control. For Vickery, communist ideology does not explain the violence any more than those closer to the peasants', such as agrarianism, populism, and nationalism. Vickery wrote of communisms, as different communist factions were opposed to each other and fought against each other, resulting in further escalation of violence.

A synthesis of both interpretations rejects the totalitarian theory in favor of a bottom-up perspective, which emphasizes the fact that the peasants did not have revolutionary ambitions. According to this perspective, the Khmer Rouge was able to effectively manipulate the peasants to mobilise them towards collective goals that they did not understand, or where the revolutionaries had no desire to create a new society, which would require a certain level of support and understanding that the Khmer Rouge was not able to win over, but were mainly motivated to tear down the old one and violence became an end in itself.

== History ==
=== Early history ===
The history of the communist movement in Cambodia can be divided into six phases, namely the emergence before World War II of the Indochinese Communist Party (ICP), whose members were almost exclusively Vietnamese; the 10-year struggle for independence from the French, when a separate Cambodian communist party, the Kampuchean People's Revolutionary Party (KPRP), was established under Vietnamese auspices; the period following the Second Party Congress of the KPRP in 1960, when Saloth Sar gained control of its apparatus; the revolutionary struggle from the initiation of the Khmer Rouge insurgency in 1967–1968 to the fall of the Lon Nol government in April 1975; the Democratic Kampuchea regime from April 1975 to January 1979; and the period following the Third Party Congress of the KPRP in January 1979, when Hanoi effectively assumed control over Cambodia's government and communist party.

In 1930, Ho Chi Minh founded the Communist Party of Vietnam by unifying three smaller communist movements that had emerged in northern, central and southern Vietnam during the late 1920s. The party was renamed the Indochinese Communist Party, ostensibly so it could include revolutionaries from Cambodia and Laos. Almost without exception, all of the earliest party members were Vietnamese. By the end of World War II, a handful of Cambodians had joined its ranks, but their influence on the Indochinese communist movement as well as their influence on developments within Cambodia was negligible.

Viet Minh units occasionally made forays into Cambodian bases during their war against the French and in conjunction with the leftist government that ruled Thailand until 1947. The Viet Minh encouraged the formation of armed, left-wing Khmer Issarak bands. On 17 April 1950, the first nationwide congress of the Khmer Issarak groups convened, and the United Issarak Front was established. Its leader was Son Ngoc Minh, and a third of its leadership consisted of members of the ICP. According to the historian David P. Chandler, the leftist Issarak groups aided by the Viet Minh occupied a sixth of Cambodia's territory by 1952, and on the eve of the Geneva Conference in 1954, they controlled as much as one half of the country. In 1951, the ICP was reorganized into three national units, namely the Vietnam Workers' Party, the Lao Issara, and the Kampuchean or Khmer People's Revolutionary Party (KPRP). According to a document issued after the reorganization, the Vietnam Workers' Party would continue to "supervise" the smaller Laotian and Cambodian movements. Most KPRP leaders and rank-and-file seem to have been either Khmer Krom or ethnic Vietnamese living in Cambodia.

According to Democratic Kampuchea's perspective of party history, the Viet Minh's failure to negotiate a political role for the KPRP at the 1954 Geneva Conference represented a betrayal of the Cambodian movement, which still controlled large areas of the countryside, and which commanded at least 5,000 armed men. Following the conference, about 1,000 members of the KPRP, including Son Ngoc Minh, made a Long March into North Vietnam, where they remained in exile. In late 1954, those who stayed in Cambodia founded a legal political party, the Pracheachon, which participated in the 1955 and the 1958 National Assembly elections. In the September 1955 election, it won about 4% of the vote but did not secure a seat in the legislature. Members of the Pracheachon were subject to harassment and arrests because the party remained outside Sihanouk's political organization, Sangkum. Government attacks prevented it from participating in the 1962 election and drove it underground. Sihanouk habitually labelled local leftists the Khmer Rouge, a term that later came to signify the party and the state headed by Pol Pot, Ieng Sary, Khieu Samphan and their associates.

During the mid-1950s, KPRP factions, the "urban committee" (headed by Tou Samouth) and the "rural committee" (headed by Sieu Heng), emerged. In very general terms, these groups espoused divergent revolutionary lines. The prevalent "urban" line endorsed by North Vietnam recognized that Sihanouk by virtue of his success in winning independence from the French was a genuine national leader whose neutralism and deep distrust of the United States made him a valuable asset in Hanoi's struggle to "liberate" South Vietnam. Advocates of this line hoped that the prince could be persuaded to distance himself from the right-wing and to adopt leftist policies. The other line, supported for the most part by rural cadres who were familiar with the harsh realities of the countryside, advocated an immediate struggle to overthrow the "feudalist" Sihanouk.

=== Paris student group ===
During the 1950s, Khmer students in Paris organized their own communist movement which had little, if any, connection to the hard-pressed party in their homeland. From their ranks came the men and women who returned home and took command of the party apparatus during the 1960s, led an effective insurgency against Lon Nol from 1968 until 1975 and established the regime of Democratic Kampuchea. Pol Pot, who rose to the leadership of the communist movement in the 1960s, attended a technical high school in the capital and then went to Paris in 1949 to study radio electronics (other sources say he attended a school for fax machines and also studied civil engineering). Described by one source as a "determined, rather plodding organizer", Pol Pot failed to obtain a degree, but according to Jesuit priest Father François Ponchaud he acquired a taste for the classics of French literature as well as an interest in the writings of Karl Marx.

Another member of the Paris student group was Ieng Sary, a Chinese-Khmer from the Mekong Delta. He attended the elite Lycée Sisowath in Phnom Penh before beginning courses in commerce and politics at the Paris Institute of Political Science (more widely known as Sciences Po) in France. Khieu Samphan specialized in economics and politics during his time in Paris. Hou Yuon studied economics and law, Son Sen studied education and literature, and Hu Nim studied law. Two members of the group, Khieu Samphan and Hou Yuon, earned doctorates from the University of Paris while Hu Nim obtained his degree from the University of Phnom Penh in 1965. Most came from landowner or civil servant families. Pol Pot and Hou Yuon may have been related to the royal family as an older sister of Pol Pot had been a concubine at the court of King Monivong. Pol Pot and Ieng Sary married Khieu Ponnary and Khieu Thirith, also known as Ieng Thirith, purportedly relatives of Khieu Samphan. These two well-educated women also played a central role in the regime of Democratic Kampuchea.

At some time between 1949 and 1951, Pol Pot and Ieng Sary joined the French Communist Party. In 1951, the two men went to East Berlin to participate in a youth festival. This experience is considered to have been a turning point in their ideological development. Meeting with Khmers who were fighting with the Viet Minh (but subsequently judged them to be too subservient to the Vietnamese), they became convinced that only a tightly disciplined party organization and a readiness for armed struggle could achieve revolution. They transformed the Khmer Students Association (KSA), to which most of the 200 or so Khmer students in Paris belonged, into an organization for nationalist and leftist ideas.

Inside the KSA and its successor organizations, there was a secret organization known as the Cercle Marxiste (Marxist circle). The organization was composed of cells of three to six members with most members knowing nothing about the overall structure of the organization. In 1952, Pol Pot, Hou Yuon, Ieng Sary and other leftists gained notoriety by sending an open letter to Sihanouk calling him the "strangler of infant democracy". A year later, the French authorities closed down the KSA, but Hou Yuon and Khieu Samphan helped to establish in 1956 a new group, the Khmer Students Union. Inside, the group was still run by the Cercle Marxiste.

The doctoral dissertations which were written by Hou Yuon and Khieu Samphan express basic themes that would later become the cornerstones of the policy that was adopted by Democratic Kampuchea. The central role of the peasants in national development was espoused by Hou Yuon in his 1955 thesis, The Cambodian Peasants and Their Prospects for Modernization, which challenged the conventional view that urbanization and industrialization are necessary precursors of development. The major argument in Khieu Samphan's 1959 thesis, Cambodia's Economy and Industrial Development, was that the country had to become self-reliant and end its economic dependency on the developed world. In its general contours, Samphan's work reflected the influence of a branch of the dependency theory school which blamed lack of development in the Third World on the economic domination of the industrialized nations.

=== Path to power and reign ===
==== KPRP's Second Congress ====
After returning to Cambodia in 1953, Pol Pot threw himself into party work. At first, he went to join with forces allied to the Viet Minh operating in the rural areas of Kampong Cham Province. After the end of the war, he moved to Phnom Penh under Tou Samouth's "urban committee", where he became an important point of contact between above-ground parties of the left and the underground secret communist movement.

His comrades Ieng Sary and Hou Yuon became teachers at a new private high school, the Lycée Kambuboth, which Hou Yuon helped to establish. Khieu Samphan returned from Paris in 1959, taught as a member of the law faculty of the University of Phnom Penh, and started a left-wing French-language publication, L'Observateur. The paper soon acquired a reputation in Phnom Penh's small academic circle. The following year, the government closed the paper, and Sihanouk's police publicly humiliated Samphan by beating, undressing and photographing him in public; as Shawcross notes, "not the sort of humiliation that men forgive or forget". Yet the experience did not prevent Samphan from advocating cooperation with Sihanouk in order to promote a united front against United States activities in South Vietnam. Khieu Samphan, Hou Yuon and Hu Nim were forced to "work through the system" by joining the Sangkum and by accepting posts in the prince's government.

In late September 1960, twenty-one leaders of the KPRP held a secret congress in a vacant room of the Phnom Penh railroad station. This pivotal event remains shrouded in mystery because its outcome has become an object of contention and considerable historical rewriting between pro-Vietnamese and anti-Vietnamese Khmer communist factions. The question of cooperation with, or resistance to, Sihanouk was thoroughly discussed. Tou Samouth, who advocated a policy of cooperation, was elected general secretary of the KPRP that was renamed the Workers' Party of Kampuchea (WPK). His ally Nuon Chea, also known as Long Reth, became deputy general secretary, but Pol Pot and Ieng Sary were named to the Political Bureau to occupy the third and the fifth highest positions in the renamed party's hierarchy. The name change is significant. By calling itself a workers' party, the Cambodian movement claimed equal status with the Vietnam Workers' Party. The pro-Vietnamese regime of the People's Republic of Kampuchea implied in the 1980s that the September 1960 meeting was nothing more than the second congress of the KPRP.

On 20 July 1962, Tou Samouth was murdered by the Cambodian government. At the WPK's second congress in February 1963, Pol Pot was chosen to succeed Tou Samouth as the party's general secretary. Samouth's allies Nuon Chea and Keo Meas were removed from the Central Committee and replaced by Son Sen and Vorn Vet. From then on, Pol Pot and loyal comrades from his Paris student days controlled the party centre, edging out older veterans whom they considered excessively pro-Vietnamese. In July 1963, Pol Pot and most of the central committee left Phnom Penh to establish an insurgent base in Ratanakiri Province in the northeast. Pol Pot had shortly before been put on a list of 34 leftists who were summoned by Sihanouk to join the government and sign statements saying Sihanouk was the only possible leader for the country. Pol Pot and Chou Chet were the only people on the list who escaped. All the others agreed to cooperate with the government and were afterward under 24-hour watch by the police.

==== Sihanouk and the GRUNK ====
The region where Pol Pot and the others moved to was inhabited by tribal minorities, the Khmer Loeu, whose rough treatment (including resettlement and forced assimilation) at the hands of the central government made them willing recruits for a guerrilla struggle. In 1965, Pol Pot made a visit of several months to North Vietnam and China. From the 1950s on, Pol Pot had made frequent visits to the People's Republic of China, receiving political and military training—especially on the theory of dictatorship of the proletariat—from the personnel of the CCP. From November 1965 to February 1966, Pol Pot received training from high-ranking CCP officials such as Chen Boda and Zhang Chunqiao, on topics such as the communist revolution in China, class conflicts, and Communist International. Pol Pot was particularly impressed by the lecture on political purge by Kang Sheng. This experience had enhanced his prestige when he returned to the WPK's "liberated areas". Despite friendly relations between Sihanouk and the Chinese, the latter kept Pol Pot's visit a secret from Sihanouk.

In September 1966, the WPK changed its name to the Communist Party of Kampuchea (CPK). The change in the name of the party was a closely guarded secret. Lower ranking members of the party and even the Vietnamese were not told of it and neither was the membership until many years later. The party leadership endorsed armed struggle against the government, then led by Sihanouk. In 1968, the Khmer Rouge was officially formed, and its forces launched a national insurgency across Cambodia. Though North Vietnam had not been informed of the decision, its forces provided shelter and weapons to the Khmer Rouge after the insurgency started. North Vietnamese support for the insurgency made it impossible for the Cambodian military to effectively counter it. For the next two years, the insurgency grew as Sihanouk did very little to stop it. As the insurgency grew stronger, the party finally openly declared itself to be the Communist Party of Kampuchea.

The political appeal of the Khmer Rouge was increased as a result of the situation created by the removal of Sihanouk as head of state on 18 March 1970. Premier Lon Nol deposed Sihanouk with the support of the National Assembly. Furthermore, he ordered North Vietnamese troops to leave Cambodian territory six days earlier and then established diplomatic relations with South Vietnam in May. Sihanouk, who was in exile in Beijing, made an alliance with the Khmer Rouge on the advice of CCP, and became the nominal head of a Khmer Rouge–dominated government-in-exile (known by its French acronym GRUNK) backed by China. In 1970 alone, the Chinese reportedly gave 400 tons of military aid to the United Front. Although thoroughly aware of the weakness of Lon Nol's forces and loath to commit American military force to the new conflict in any form other than air power, the Nixon administration supported the newly proclaimed Khmer Republic.

On 29 March 1970, the North Vietnamese launched an offensive against the Cambodian army. Documents uncovered from the Soviet Union archives revealed that the invasion was launched at the explicit request of the Khmer Rouge following negotiations with Nuon Chea. A force of North Vietnamese quickly overran large parts of eastern Cambodia reaching to within 15 miles (24 km) of Phnom Penh before being pushed back. By June, three months after the removal of Sihanouk, they had swept government forces from the entire northeastern third of the country. After defeating those forces, the North Vietnamese turned the newly won territories over to the local insurgents. The Khmer Rouge also established "liberated" areas in the south and the southwestern parts of the country, where they operated independently of the North Vietnamese.

After Sihanouk showed his support for the Khmer Rouge by visiting them in the field, their ranks swelled from 6,000 to 50,000 fighters. Many of the new recruits for the Khmer Rouge were apolitical peasants who fought in support of the king, not for communism, of which they had little understanding. Sihanouk's popular support in rural Cambodia allowed the Khmer Rouge to extend its power and influence to the point that by 1973 it exercised de facto control over the majority of Cambodian territory, although only a minority of its population. By 1975, with the Lon Nol government running out of ammunition, it was clear that it was only a matter of time before the government would collapse. On 17 April 1975, there was the Fall of Phnom Penh, as the Khmer Rouge captured the capital.

During the civil war, unparalleled atrocities were executed on both sides. While the civil war was brutal, its estimated death toll has been revised downwards over time.

==== Foreign involvement ====
===== Before 1975 =====
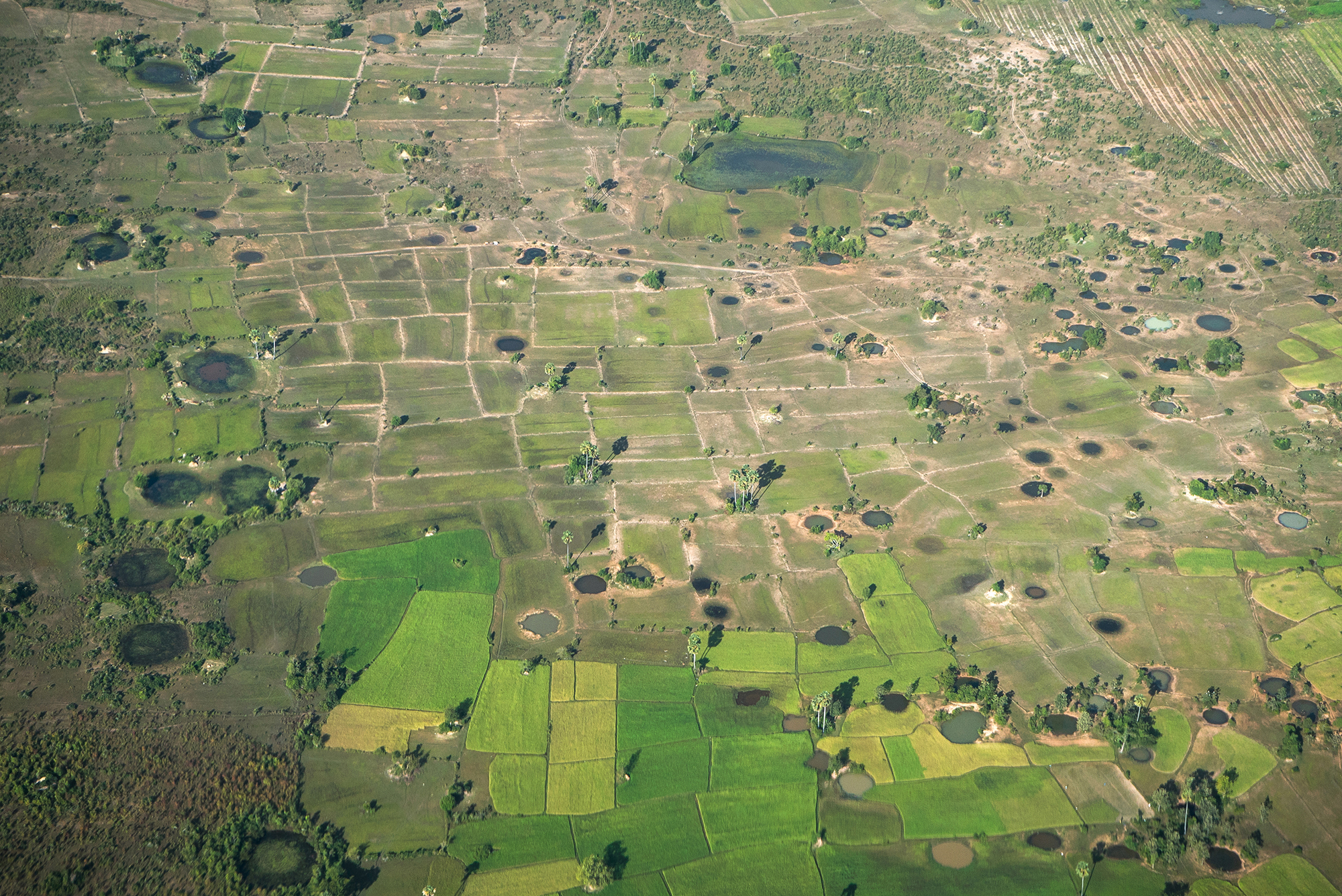
An aerial view of bomb craters in Cambodia

The relationship between the massive carpet bombing of Cambodia by the United States and the growth of the Khmer Rouge, in terms of recruitment and popular support, has been a matter of interest to historians. Some scholars, including Michael Ignatieff, Adam Jones and Greg Grandin, have cited the United States intervention and bombing campaign (spanning 1965–1973) as a significant factor which led to increased support for the Khmer Rouge among the Cambodian peasantry.

According to Ben Kiernan, the Khmer Rouge "would not have won power without U.S. economic and military destabilization of Cambodia. ... It used the bombing's devastation and massacre of civilians as recruitment propaganda and as an excuse for its brutal, radical policies and its purge of moderate communists and Sihanoukists." Pol Pot biographer David P. Chandler writes that the bombing "had the effect the Americans wanted – it broke the Communist encirclement of Phnom Penh", but it also accelerated the collapse of rural society and increased social polarization. Peter Rodman and Michael Lind claim that the United States intervention saved the Lon Nol regime from collapse in 1970 and 1973. Craig Etcheson acknowledged that U.S. intervention increased recruitment for the Khmer Rouge but disputed that it was a primary cause of the Khmer Rouge victory. William Shawcross writes that the United States bombing and ground incursion plunged Cambodia into the chaos that Sihanouk had worked for years to avoid.

By 1973, Vietnamese support of the Khmer Rouge had largely disappeared. On the other hand, the CCP largely "armed and trained" the Khmer Rouge, including Pol Pot, both during the Cambodian Civil War and the years afterward. In 1970 alone, the Chinese reportedly gave 400 tons of military aid to the National United Front of Kampuchea formed by Sihanouk and the Khmer Rouge.

===== 1975–1992 =====
In April 1975, the Khmer Rouge seized power in Cambodia, and in January 1976, Democratic Kampuchea was established. During the Cambodian genocide, the CCP was the main international patron of the Khmer Rouge, supplying "more than 15,000 military advisers" and most of its external aid. It is estimated that at least 90% of the foreign aid to Khmer Rouge came from China, with 1975 alone seeing US$1 billion in interest-free economic and military aid and a US$20 million gift, which was "the biggest aid ever given to any one country by China". In June 1975, Pol Pot and other officials of Khmer Rouge met with Mao Zedong in Beijing, receiving Mao's approval and advice; in addition, Mao also taught Pot his "Theory of Continuing Revolution under the Dictatorship of the Proletariat" (无产阶级专政下继续革命理论). High-ranking CCP officials such as Zhang Chunqiao later visited Cambodia to offer help.

Democratic Kampuchea was overthrown by the Vietnamese army in January 1979, and the Khmer Rouge fled to Thailand. However, to counter the power of the Soviet Union and Vietnam, a group of countries—including China, the United States, Thailand, and some other Western nations—supported the Khmer Rouge–dominated Coalition Government of Democratic Kampuchea in retaining Cambodia's seat in the United Nations, which it held until 1993, after the Cold War had ended. In 2009, China defended its past ties with previous Cambodian governments, including that of Democratic Kampuchea or Khmer Rouge, which at the time had a legal seat at the United Nations and foreign relations with more than 70 countries.

==== Regime ====
===== Leadership =====
The governing structure of Democratic Kampuchea was split between the state presidium headed by Khieu Samphan, the cabinet headed by Pol Pot (who was also Democratic Kampuchea's prime minister) and the party's own Politburo and Central Committee. All were complicated by a number of political factions which existed in 1975. The leadership of the Party Centre, the faction which was headed by Pol Pot, remained largely unchanged from the early 1960s to the mid-1990s. Its leaders were mostly from middle-class families and had been educated at French universities. The second significant faction was made up of men who had been active in the pre-1960 party and had stronger links to Vietnam as a result; government documents show that there were several major shifts in power between factions during the period in which the regime was in control.

In 1975–1976, there were several powerful regional Khmer Rouge leaders who maintained their own armies and had different party backgrounds than the members of the Pol Pot clique, particularly So Phim and Nhim Ros, both of whom were vice presidents of the state presidium and members of the Politburo and Central Committee respectively. A possible military coup attempt was made in May 1976, and its leader was a senior Eastern Zone cadre named Chan Chakrey, who had been appointed deputy secretary of the army's General Staff. A reorganisation that occurred in September 1976, during which Pol Pot was demoted in the state presidium, was later presented as an attempted pro-Vietnamese coup by the Party Centre. Over the next two years Nhim Ros, Vorn Vet and many other figures who had been associated with the pre-1960 party were arrested and executed, with So Phim committing suicide after being proclaimed a traitor. Phim's suicide was followed by the massacre of the majority of the cadres and much of the civilian population of the Eastern Zone that he had controlled. The Party Centre, lacking much in the way of their own military resources, accomplished their seizure of power by forming an alliance with Southwestern Zone leader Ta Mok and Ke Pok, head of the North Zone's troops. Both men were of a purely peasant background and were therefore natural allies of the strongly peasant ideology of the Pol Pot faction.

The Standing Committee of the Khmer Rouge's Central Committee during its period of power consisted of the following:

- Pol Pot (Saloth Sar), "Brother number 1", General Secretary from 1963 until his death in 1998 and effectively the leader of the movement.
- Nuon Chea (Long Bunruot), "Brother number 2", Prime Minister. High status made him Pol Pot's "right hand man".
- Ieng Sary (Pol Pot's brother-in-law), "Brother number 3", Deputy Prime Minister.
- Khieu Samphan, "Brother number 4", President of Democratic Kampuchea.
- Ta Mok (Chhit Chhoeun), "Brother number 5", Southwest Regional Secretary.
- Son Sen, "Brother number 89", Defence Minister, superior of Kang Kek Iew and executed on Pol Pot's orders for treason.
- Yun Yat, wife of Son Sen, former Information Minister, executed with Son Sen.
- Ke Pauk, "Brother number 13", former secretary of the Northern zone.
- Ieng Thirith, sister-in-law of Pol Pot and wife of Ieng Sary, former Social Affairs Minister.

==== Life under Khmer Rouge rule ====
The Khmer Rouge carried out a radical program that included isolating the country from all foreign influences, closing schools, hospitals and some factories, abolishing banking, finance and currency, and collectivising agriculture. Khmer Rouge theorists, who developed the ideas of Hou Yuon and Khieu Samphan, believed that an initial period of self-imposed economic isolation and national self-sufficiency would stimulate the rebirth of the crafts as well as the rebirth of the country's latent industrial capability.

==== Evacuation of the cities ====
In Phnom Penh and other cities, the Khmer Rouge told residents that they would be moved only about "two or three kilometers" away from the city and would return in "two or three days". Some witnesses said they were told that the evacuation was because of the "threat of American bombing" and they were also told that they did not have to lock their houses since the Khmer Rouge would "take care of everything" until they returned. If people refused to evacuate, they would immediately be killed and their homes would be burned to the ground. The evacuees were sent on long marches to the countryside, which killed thousands of children, elderly people and sick people. These were not the first evacuations of civilian populations by the Khmer Rouge; similar evacuations of populations without possessions had been occurring on a smaller scale since the early 1970s.

On arrival at the villages to which they had been assigned, evacuees were required to write brief autobiographical essays. The essay's content, particularly with regard to the subject's activity during the Khmer Republic regime, was used to determine their fate. Military officers and those occupying elite professional roles were usually sent for reeducation, which in practice meant immediate execution or confinement in a labour camp. Those with specialist technical skills often found themselves sent back to cities to restart production in factories which had been interrupted by the takeover. The remaining displaced urban population ("new people"), as part of the regime's drive to increase food production, were placed into agricultural communes alongside the peasant "base people" or "old people". The latter's holdings were collectivised. Cambodians were expected to produce three tons of rice per hectare, whereas before the Khmer Rouge era the average was one ton per hectare.

The lack of agricultural knowledge on the part of the former city dwellers made famine inevitable. The rural peasantry were often unsympathetic, or they were too frightened to assist them. Such acts as picking wild fruit or berries were seen as "private enterprise" and punished with death. Labourers were forced to work long shifts without adequate rest or food, resulting in many deaths through exhaustion, illness and starvation. Workers were executed for attempting to escape from the communes, for breaching minor rules, or after being denounced by colleagues. If caught, offenders were taken off to a distant forest or field after sunset and killed. Due to the widespread and constant nature of state violence, the regime's autarkic and economically disruptive industrial policies, and especially after the outbreak of war with Vietnam in 1978, even bullets would fall into scarcity. As a result, executions were often carried out using crude implements such as a hoes, machetes, and pickaxes.

Unwilling to import Western medicines, the regime turned to traditional medicine instead and placed medical care in the hands of cadres who were only given rudimentary training. The famine, forced labour and lack of access to appropriate services led to a high number of deaths.

==== Economic policies ====
Khmer Rouge economic policies took a similarly extreme course. Officially, trade was restricted to bartering between communes, a policy which the regime developed in order to enforce self-reliance. Banks were raided, and all currency and records were destroyed by fire, thus eliminating any claim to funds. After 1976, the regime reinstated discussion of export in the period after the disastrous effects of its planning began to become apparent. Commercial fishing was banned in 1976.

==== Family relations ====
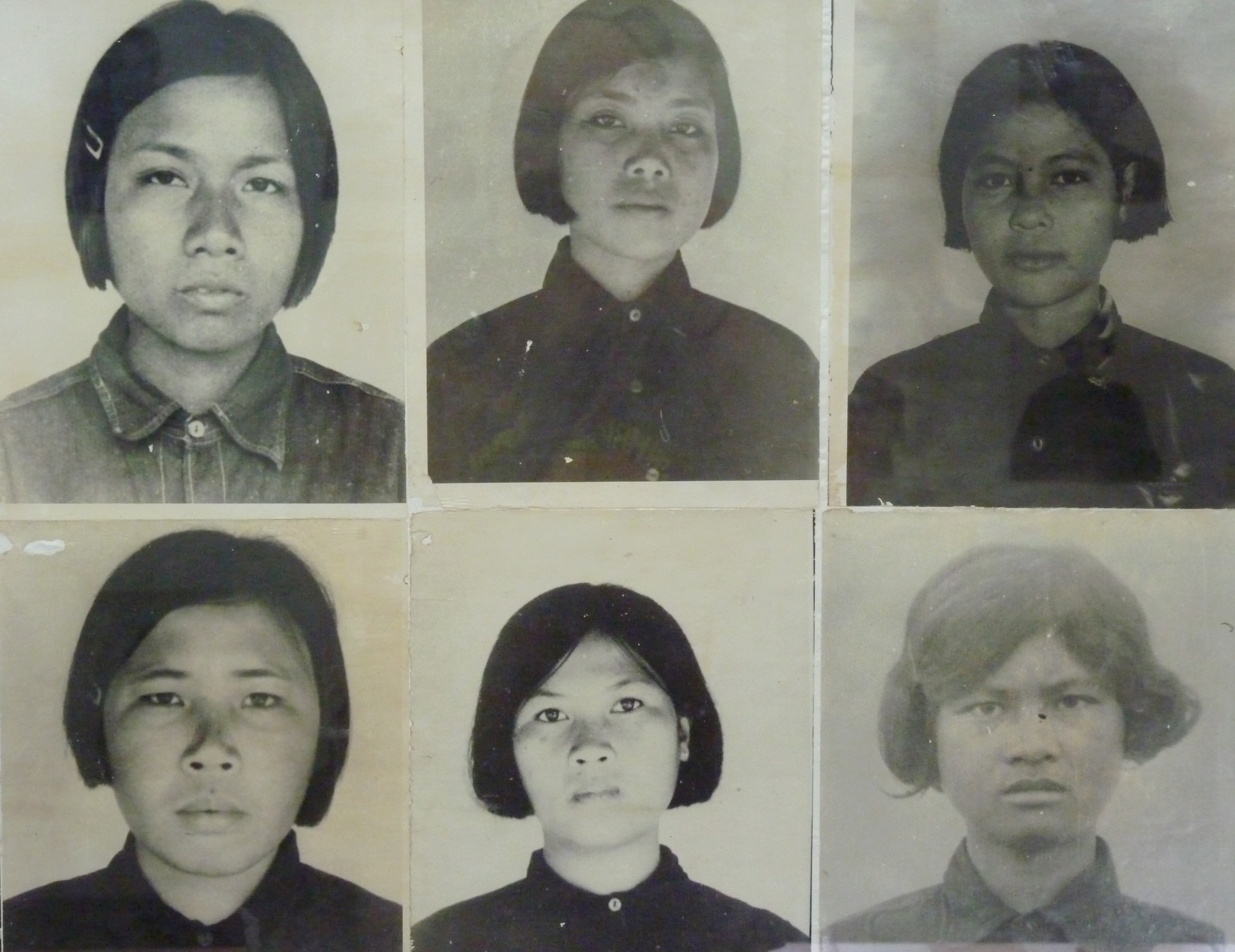
Rooms of the Tuol Sleng Genocide Museum contain thousands of photos taken by the Khmer Rouge of their victims.

The regulations made by the Angkar (អង្គការ, The Organisation, which was the ruling body) also had effects on the traditional Cambodian family unit. The regime was primarily interested in increasing the young population and one of the strictest regulations prohibited sex outside marriage which was punishable by execution. The Khmer Rouge followed a morality based on an idealised conception of the attitudes of prewar rural Cambodia. Marriage required permission from the authorities, and the Khmer Rouge were strict, giving permission to marry only to people of the same class and level of education. Such rules were applied even more strictly to party cadres. While some refugees spoke of families being deliberately broken up, this appears to have referred mainly to the traditional Cambodian extended family unit, which the regime actively sought to destroy in favour of small nuclear units of parents and children.

The regime promoted arranged marriages, particularly between party cadres. While some academics such as Michael Vickery have noted that arranged marriages were also a feature of rural Cambodia prior to 1975, those conducted by the Khmer Rouge regime often involved people unfamiliar to each other. As well as reflecting the Khmer Rouge obsession with production and reproduction, such marriages were designed to increase people's dependency on the regime by undermining existing family and other loyalties.

==== Education ====
It is often concluded that the Khmer Rouge regime promoted functional illiteracy. This statement is not completely incorrect, but it is quite inaccurate. The Khmer Rouge wanted to "eliminate all traces of Cambodia's imperialist past", and its previous culture was one of them. The Khmer Rouge did not want the Cambodian people to be completely ignorant, and primary education was provided to them. Nevertheless, the Khmer Rouge's policies dramatically reduced the Cambodian population's cultural inflow as well as its knowledge and creativity. The Khmer Rouge's goal was to gain full control of all of the information that the Cambodian people received and spread revolutionary culture among the masses.

Education came to a "virtual standstill" in Democratic Kampuchea. Irrespective of central policies, most local cadres considered higher education useless and as a result, they were suspicious of those who had received it. The regime abolished all literary schooling above primary grades, ostensibly focusing on basic literacy instead. In practice, primary schools were not set up in many areas because of the extreme disruptions which had been caused by the regime's takeover, and most ordinary people, especially "new people", felt that their children were taught nothing worthwhile in those schools which still existed. The exception was the Eastern Zone, which until 1976 was run by cadres who were closely connected with Vietnam rather than the Party Centre, where a more organised system seems to have existed under which children were given extra rations, taught by teachers who were drawn from the "base people" and given a limited number of official textbooks.

Beyond primary education, technical courses were taught in factories to students who were drawn from the favoured "base people". There was a general reluctance to increase people's education in Democratic Kampuchea, and in some districts, cadres were known to kill people who boasted about their educational accomplishments, and it was considered bad form for people to allude to any special technical training. Based on a speech which Pol Pot made in 1978, it appears that he may have ultimately envisaged that illiterate students with approved poor peasant backgrounds could become trained engineers within ten years by doing a lot of targeted studying along with a lot of practical work.

==== Language reforms ====
The Khmer language has a complex system of usages to define speakers' rank and social status. During the rule of the Khmer Rouge, these usages were abolished. People were encouraged to call each other "friend" (មិត្ត; mitt) and to avoid traditional signs of deference such as bowing or folding the hands in salutation, known as sampeah. Language was also transformed in other ways. The Khmer Rouge invented new terms. In keeping with the regime's theories on Khmer identity, the majority of new words were coined with reference to Pali or Sanskrit terms, while Chinese and Vietnamese–language borrowings were discouraged. People were told to "forge" (លត់ដំ; lot dam) a new revolutionary character, that they were the "instruments" (ឧបករណ៍; opokar) of the ruling body known as Angkar (អង្គការ, The Organisation) and that nostalgia for pre-revolutionary times (ឈឺសតិអារម្មណ៍; chheu satek arom, or "memory sickness") could result in execution.

==== Crimes against humanity ====
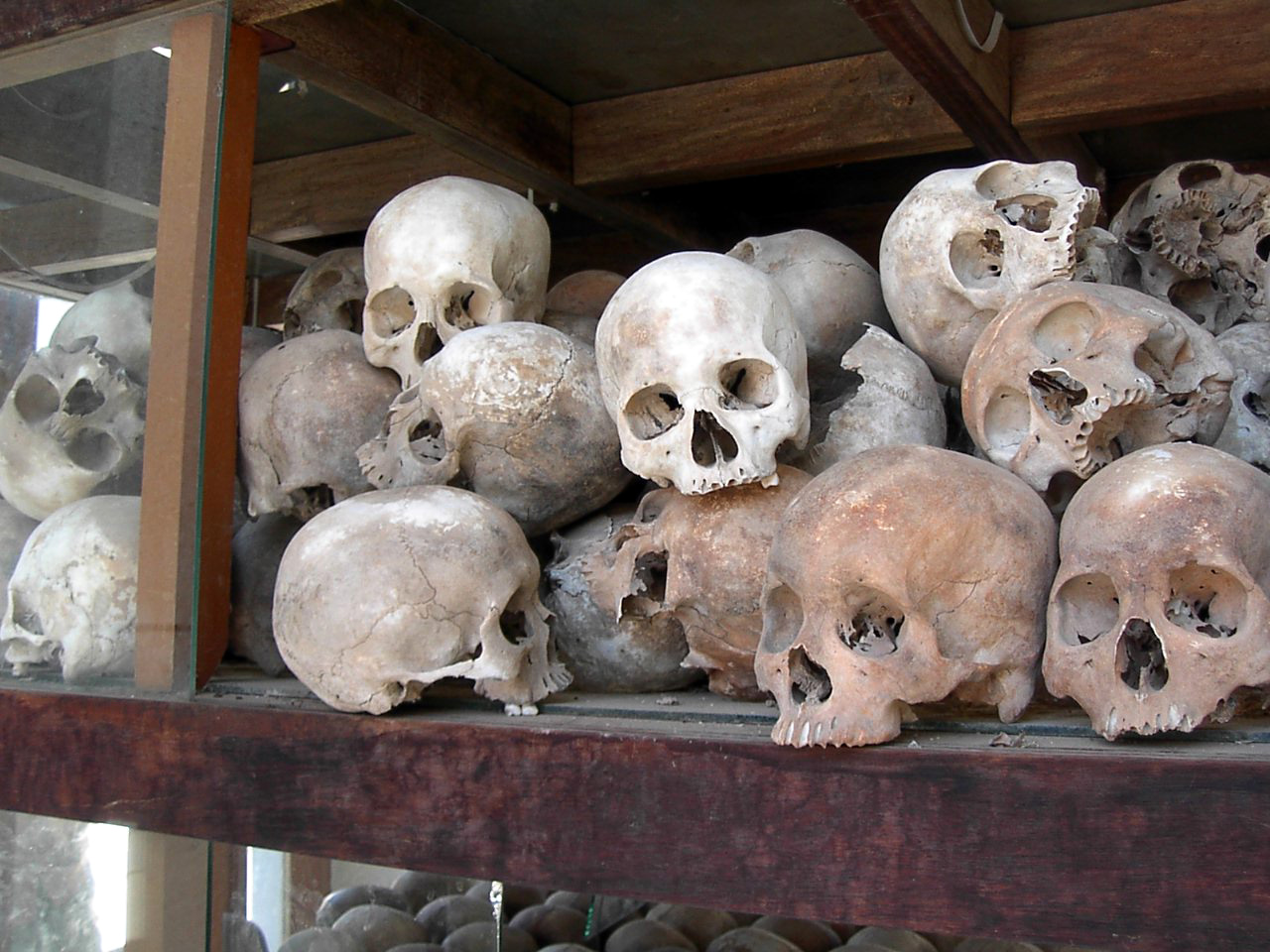
Skulls of Khmer Rouge victims

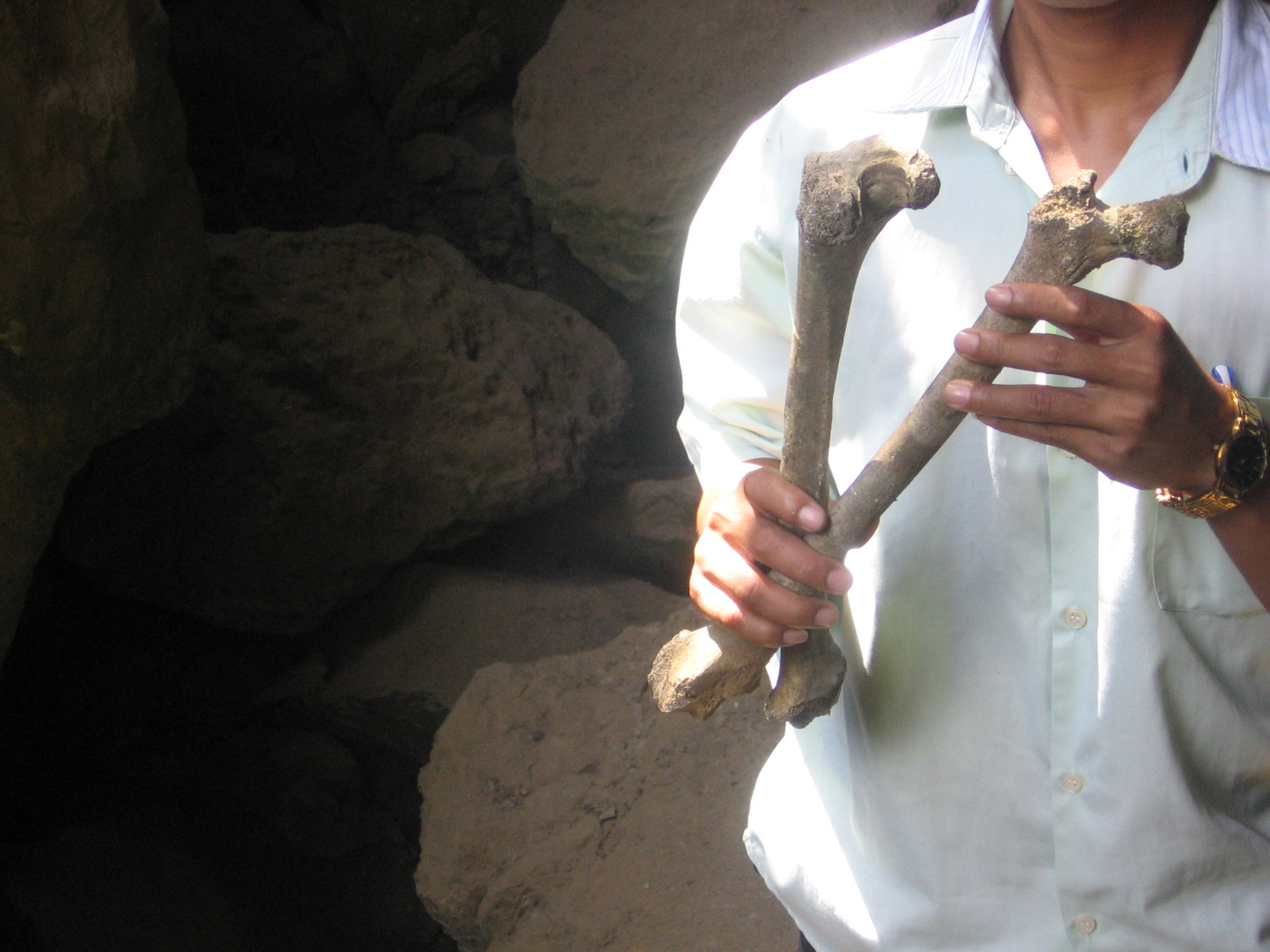
Remains of victims of the Khmer Rouge in the Kampong Trach Cave, Kiry Seila Hills, Rung Tik (Water Cave), or Rung Khmao (Dead Cave)

Acting through the Santebal, the Khmer Rouge arrested, tortured and eventually executed anyone who was suspected of belonging to several categories of supposed enemies:

- People with connections to former Cambodian governments, either those of the Khmer Republic or the Sangkum, to the Khmer Republic military, or to foreign governments.
- Professionals and intellectuals, mostly those who were formerly civil servants, teachers or foreign diplomats and people who understood a foreign language. Many artists—including musicians, writers, and filmmakers—were executed, including Ros Serey Sothea, Pan Ron and Sinn Sisamouth.
- Ethnic Vietnamese, ethnic Chinese, ethnic Thai and other minorities in the Eastern Highlands, Cambodian Christians (most of whom were Catholic), Muslims and senior Buddhist monks. The Roman Catholic cathedral of Phnom Penh was razed. The Khmer Rouge forced Muslims to eat pork, which they regard as forbidden (ḥarām). Many of those who refused were killed. Christian clergy and Muslim imams were executed.
- "Economic saboteurs" as many former urban dwellers were deemed guilty of sabotage because of their lack of agricultural ability.
- Party cadres who had fallen under political suspicion; the regime tortured and executed thousands of party members during its purges.

The Santebal established over 150 prisons for political opponents; Tuol Sleng is a former high school that was turned into the Santebal headquarters and interrogation center for the highest-value political prisoners. Tuol Sleng was operated by the Santebal commander Khang Khek Ieu, more commonly known as Comrade Duch, together with his subordinates Mam Nai and Tang Sin Hean. According to Ben Kiernan, "all but seven of the twenty thousand Tuol Sleng prisoners" were executed. The buildings of Tuol Sleng have been preserved as they were left when the Khmer Rouge were driven out in 1979. Several of the rooms are now lined with thousands of black-and-white photographs of prisoners that were taken by the Khmer Rouge.

On 7 August 2014, when sentencing two former Khmer Rouge leaders to life imprisonment, Cambodian judge Nil Nonn said there was evidence of "a widespread and systematic attack against the civilian population of Cambodia". He said the leaders, Nuon Chea, the regime's chief ideologue and former deputy to late leader Pol Pot and Khieu Samphan, the former head of state, together in a "joint criminal enterprise" were involved in murder, extermination, political persecution and other inhumane acts related to the mass eviction of city-dwellers, and executions of enemy soldiers. In November 2018, the trial convicted Nuon Chea and Khieu Samphan of crimes against humanity and genocide against the Vietnamese, while Nuon Chea was also found guilty of genocide relating to the Chams.

==== Number of deaths ====
According to a 2001 academic source, the most widely accepted estimates of excess deaths under the Khmer Rouge range from 1.5 million to 2 million, although figures as low as 1 million and as high as 3 million have been cited; conventionally accepted estimates of executions range from 500,000 to 1 million, "a third to one half of excess mortality during the period". A 2013 academic source (citing research from 2009) indicates that execution may have accounted for as much as 60% of the total, with 23,745 mass graves containing approximately 1.3 million suspected victims of execution.

Historian Ben Kiernan estimates that 1.671 million to 1.871 million Cambodians died as a result of Khmer Rouge policy, or between 21% and 24% of Cambodia's 1975 population. A study by Polish demographer Marek Sliwinski calculated nearly 2 million unnatural deaths under the Khmer Rouge out of a 1975 Cambodian population of 7.8 million; 33.5% of Cambodian men died under the Khmer Rouge compared to 15.7% of Cambodian women. Researcher Craig Etcheson of the Documentation Center of Cambodia (DC-Cam) suggests that the death toll was between 2 million and 2.5 million, with a "most likely" figure of 2.2 million. After five years of researching mass grave sites, he estimated that they contained 1.38 million suspected victims of execution. Although considerably higher than earlier and more widely accepted estimates of Khmer Rouge executions, Etcheson argues that these numbers are plausible, given the nature of the mass grave and DC-Cam's methods, which are more likely to produce an under-count of bodies rather than an over-estimate. Demographer Patrick Heuveline estimated that between 1.17 million and 3.42 million Cambodians died unnatural deaths between 1970 and 1979, with between 150,000 and 300,000 of those deaths occurring during the civil war. Heuveline's central estimate is 2.52 million excess deaths, of which 1.4 million were the direct result of violence.

Despite being based on a house-to-house survey of Cambodians, the estimate of 3.3 million deaths promulgated by the Khmer Rouge's successor regime, the People's Republic of Kampuchea (PRK), is generally considered to be an exaggeration; among other methodological errors, the PRK authorities added the estimated number of victims that had been found in the partially exhumed mass graves to the raw survey results, meaning that some victims would have been double-counted. An additional 300,000 Cambodians starved to death between 1979 and 1980, largely as a result of the after-effects of Khmer Rouge policy.

==== Genocide ====
While the period from 1975 to 1979 is commonly associated with the phrase "the Cambodian genocide", scholars debate whether the legal definition of the crime can be applied generally. While two former leaders were convicted of genocide, this was for treatment of ethnic and religious minorities, the Vietnamese and Cham. The death toll of these two groups, approximately 100,000 people, is roughly 5% of the generally accepted total of two million. The treatment of these groups can be seen to fall under the legal definition of genocide, as they were targeted on the basis of their religion or ethnicity. The vast majority of deaths were of the Khmer ethnic group, which was not a target of the Khmer Rouge. The deaths occurring as a result of targeting these Khmer, whether it was the "new people" or enemies of the regime, was based on political distinctions rather than ethnic or religious. In an interview conducted in 2018, historian David P. Chandler states that crimes against humanity was the term that best fit the atrocities of the regime and that some attempts to characterise the majority of the killings as genocide was flawed and at times politicised.

=== Internal power struggles and purges ===
Hou Yuon was one of the first senior leaders to be purged. The Khmer Rouge originally reported that he had been killed in the final battles for Phnom Penh, but he was apparently executed in late 1975 or early 1976. In late 1975, numerous Cambodian intellectuals, professionals and students returned from overseas to support the revolution. These returnees were treated with suspicion and made to undergo reeducation, while some were sent straight to Tuol Sleng. In 1976, the center announced the start of the socialist revolution and ordered the elimination of class enemies. This resulted in the expulsion and execution of numerous people within the party and army who were deemed to be of the wrong class. In mid-1976, Ieng Thirith, minister of social affairs, inspected the northwestern zone. On her return to Phnom Penh, she reported that the zone's cadres were deliberately disobeying orders from the center, blaming enemy agents who were trying to undermine the revolution. During 1976, troops formerly from the eastern zone demanded the right to marry without the party's approval. They were arrested and under interrogation implicated their commander who then implicated eastern zone cadres who were arrested and executed.

In September 1976, Keo Meas, who had been tasked with writing a history of the party, was arrested as a result of disputes over the foundation date of the party and its reliance on Vietnamese support. Under torture at Tuol Sleng, he confessed that the date chosen was part of a plot to undermine the party's legitimacy and was then executed. In late 1976, with the Kampuchean economy underperforming, Pol Pot ordered a purge of the ministry of commerce, and Khoy Thoun and his subordinates who he had brought from the northern zone were arrested and tortured before being executed at Tuol Sleng. Khoy Thoun confessed to having been recruited by the CIA in 1958. The center also ordered troops from the eastern and central zones to purge the northern zone, killing or arresting numerous cadres.

At the end of 1976, following disappointing rice harvests in the northwestern zone, the party center ordered a purge of the zone. Troops from the western and southwestern zones were ordered into the northwestern zone. Over the next year, troops killed at least 40 senior cadre and numerous lower ranking leaders.

The chaos caused by this purge allowed many Khmers to escape the zone and try to seek refuge in Thailand, but was met with gunfire by the Thai army, who then raped the Khmer women and children while they were hiding near the border with their families. The United Nations Border Relief Operation (UNBRO), formed on 1 January 1982, coordinated humanitarian assistance to Cambodian displaced persons along the Thai–Cambodian border.

In 1977, the center began purging the returnees, sending 148 to Tuol Sleng and continuing a purge of the ministry of foreign affairs where many returnees and intellectuals were suspected of spying for foreign powers. In January, the center ordered eastern and southeastern zone troops to conduct cross-border raids into Vietnam. In March 1977, the center ordered So Phim, the eastern zone commander, to send his troops to the border; however, with class warfare purges underway in the eastern zone, many units staged a mutiny and fled into Vietnam. Among the troops defecting in this period was Hun Sen. On 10 April 1977 Hu Nim and his wife were arrested. After three months of interrogation at Tuol Sleng, he confessed to working with the CIA to undermine the revolution following which he and his wife were executed. In July 1977, Pol Pot and Duch sent So Phim a list of "traitors" in the eastern zone, many of whom were So Phim's trusted subordinates. So Phim disputed the list and refused to execute those listed, for the center this implicated So Phim as a traitor. In October 1977, in order to secure the Thai border while focusing on confrontation with Vietnam, Nhim Ros, the northwestern zone leader, was blamed for clashes on the Thai border, acting on behalf of both the Vietnamese and the CIA.

In December 1977, the Vietnamese launched a punitive attack into eastern Cambodia, quickly routing the eastern zone troops including Heng Samrin's Division 4 and further convincing Pol Pot of So Phim's treachery. Son Sen was sent to the eastern zone with center zone troops to aid the defense. In January 1978, following the Vietnamese withdrawal, a purge of the eastern zone began. In March, So Phim called a secret meeting of his closest subordinates advising them that those who had been purged were not traitors and warning them to be wary. During the next month more than 400 eastern zone cadres were sent to Tuol Sleng while two eastern zone division commanders were replaced. During May eastern zone military leaders were called to meetings where they were arrested or killed. So Phim was called to a meeting by Son Sen but refused to attend, instead sending four messengers who failed to return. On 25 May, Son Sen sent two brigades of troops to attack the eastern zone and capture So Phim. Unable to believe he was being purged, So Phim went into hiding and attempted to contact Pol Pot by radio. A meeting was arranged, but instead of Pol Pot, a group of center soldiers arrived, and So Phim committed suicide and the soldiers then killed his family.

Many of the surviving eastern zone leaders fled into the forests where they hid from and fought center zone troops. In October 1978, Chea Sim led a group of 300 people across the border into Vietnam, and the Vietnamese then launched a raid into the eastern zone that allowed Heng Samrin and his group of 2,000 to 3,000 soldiers and followers to seek refuge in Vietnam. Meanwhile, the center decided that the entire eastern zone was full of traitors and embarked on a large scale purge of the area, with over 10,000 killed by July 1978, while thousands were evacuated to other zones to prevent them from defecting to the Vietnamese. The center also stepped up purges nationwide, killing cadres and their families, "old people" and eastern zone evacuees who were regarded as having dubious loyalty.

In September 1978, a purge of the ministry of industry was begun, and in November Pol Pot ordered the arrest of Vorn Vet, the deputy premier for the economy, followed by his supporters. Vorn Vet had previously served as the secretary of the zone around Phnom Penh, had established the Santebal and been Duch's immediate superior. Under torture, Vorn Vet admitted to being an agent of the CIA and the Vietnamese. Unable to reach the borders, ministry of industry personnel who could escape the purge went into hiding in Phnom Penh.

=== Fall ===
==== War with Vietnam ====
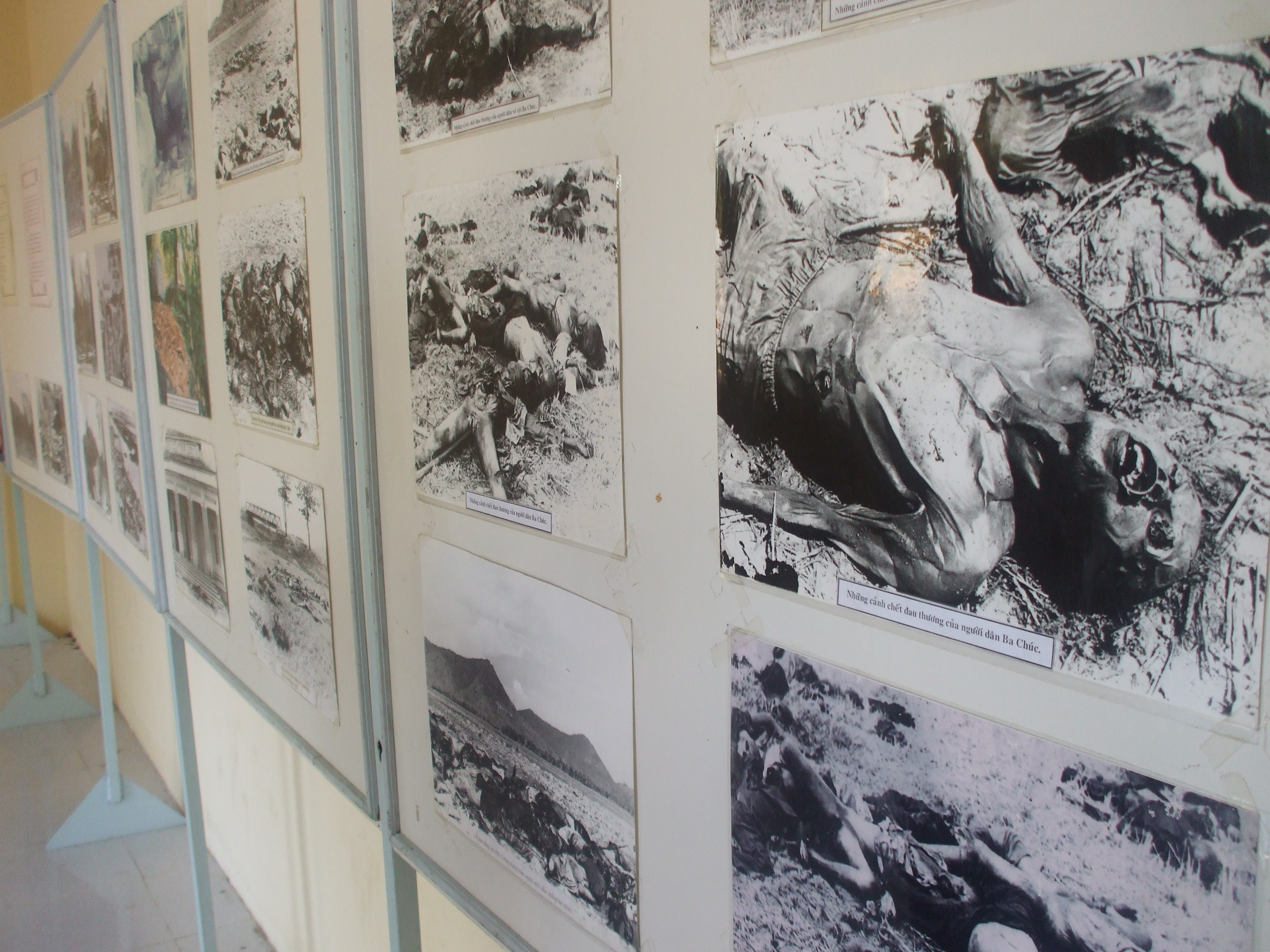
Photo images of the Ba Chúc massacre at a Vietnamese museum, as the massacre was one of the events that prompted the 1978 Vietnamese invasion of Kampuchea

Fearing that Vietnam would attack Cambodia, Pol Pot ordered a pre-emptive invasion of Vietnam on 18 April 1978. His Khmer Rouge forces crossed the border and looted nearby villages, mostly in the border town of Ba Chúc. Of the 3,157 civilians who had lived in Ba Chúc, only two survived the massacre. These Khmer Rouge forces were repelled by the Vietnamese.

After several years of border conflict and after a flood of refugees fled from Kampuchea, relations between Kampuchea and Vietnam collapsed by December 1978. On 25 December 1978, the Vietnamese armed forces along with the Kampuchean United Front for National Salvation, an organization founded by Heng Samrin that included many dissatisfied former Khmer Rouge members, invaded Cambodia and captured Phnom Penh on 7 January 1979. Despite a traditional Cambodian fear of Vietnamese domination, defecting Khmer Rouge activists assisted the Vietnamese, and with Vietnam's approval, they became the core of the new People's Republic of Kampuchea. The new government was quickly dismissed as a "puppet government" by the Khmer Rouge and China.

At the same time, the Khmer Rouge retreated west and it continued to control certain areas near the Thai border for the next decade. These included Phnom Malai, the mountainous areas near Pailin in the Cardamom Mountains and Anlong Veng in the Dângrêk Mountains. These Khmer Rouge bases were not self-sufficient and were funded by diamond and timber smuggling, military assistance from China channeled by means of the Thai military, and food smuggled from markets across the border in Thailand.

==== Place in the United Nations ====
Despite its deposal, the Khmer Rouge retained its United Nations seat, which was occupied by Thiounn Prasith, an old companion of Pol Pot and Ieng Sary from their student days in Paris and one of the 21 attendees at the 1960 KPRP Second Congress. The seat was retained under the name Democratic Kampuchea until 1982 and then it was retained under the name Coalition Government of Democratic Kampuchea. Western governments voted in favor of the Coalition Government of Democratic Kampuchea retaining Cambodia's seat in the organization over the newly installed Vietnamese-backed People's Republic of Kampuchea, even though it included the Khmer Rouge. In 1988, Margaret Thatcher stated: "So, you'll find that the more reasonable ones of the Khmer Rouge will have to play some part in the future government, but only a minority part. I share your utter horror that these terrible things went on in Kampuchea". On the contrary, Sweden changed its vote in the United Nations and it withdrew its support for the Khmer Rouge after many Swedish citizens wrote letters to their elected representatives in which they demanded a policy change towards Pol Pot's regime.

The origin of the international proxy war between the US and the Soviet Union dates back to the origin of the Cambodian Civil War. The Kingdom of Cambodia was supported by the United States, the Khmer Republic (that eventually took over after the removal of Prince Sihanouk) and South Vietnam. The other side, the National United Front of Kampuchea, was supported by the Khmer Rouge, North Vietnam, China and the Soviet Union. Cambodia became an instrument for the superpowers, the United States and the Soviet Union. The measures that the US employed in Cambodia were seen as preventative acts which were supposed to stop the communists. These preventative acts included the deployment of military troops and the establishment of other institutions like the UNTAC.

==== Insurgency and surrender ====
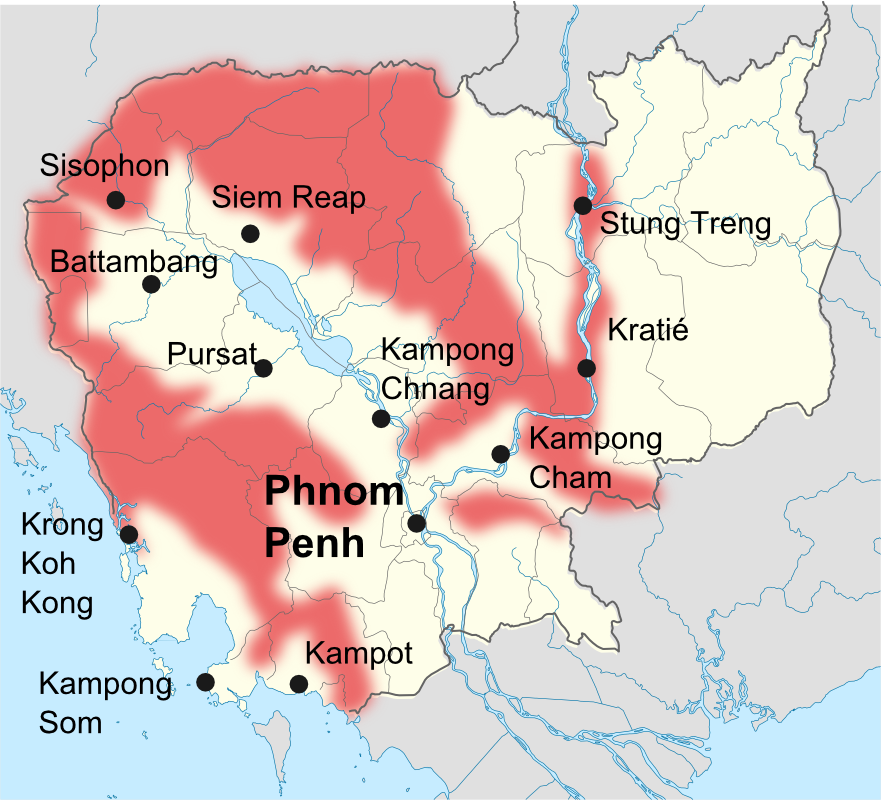
Khmer Rouge's activities in 1989–90

Vietnam's victory was supported by the Soviet Union and had significant ramifications for the region. The People's Republic of China launched a punitive invasion of northern Vietnam but then retreated, with both sides claiming victory. China, the United States and the ASEAN countries sponsored the creation and the military operations of a Cambodian government in exile, known as the Coalition Government of Democratic Kampuchea, which included the Khmer Rouge, the republican Khmer People's National Liberation Front and the royalist Funcinpec Party.

Eastern and central Cambodia were firmly under the control of Vietnam and its Cambodian allies by 1980, while the western part of the country continued to be a battlefield throughout the 1980s, and millions of land mines were sown across the countryside. The Khmer Rouge, still led by Pol Pot, was the strongest of the three rebel groups in the Coalition Government, which received extensive military aid from China, Britain and the United States and intelligence from the Thai military. Great Britain and the United States in particular gave aid to the two non-Khmer Rouge members of the coalition.

In an attempt to broaden its support base, the Khmer Rouge formed the Patriotic and Democratic Front of the Great National Union of Kampuchea in 1979. In 1981, the Khmer Rouge went so far as to officially renounce communism and somewhat moved their ideological emphasis to nationalism and anti-Vietnamese rhetoric instead. Some analysts argue that this change meant little in practice because according to historian Kelvin Rowley, the "CPK propaganda had always relied on nationalist rather than revolutionary appeals". With the need for broader unity against Vietnam, a unity that an explicit communist line would hamper, in December 1981, the Khmer Rouge established the Party of Democratic Kampuchea to replace the CPK and officially abandoned Marxism–Leninism to choose democratic socialism.

Pol Pot relinquished the Khmer Rouge leadership to Khieu Samphan in 1985; however, he continued to be the driving force behind the Khmer Rouge insurgency, giving speeches to his followers. Journalist Nate Thayer, who spent some time with the Khmer Rouge during that period, commented that despite the international community's near-universal condemnation of the Khmer Rouge's brutal rule, a considerable number of Cambodians in Khmer Rouge–controlled areas seemed genuinely to support Pol Pot. While Vietnam proposed to withdraw from Cambodia in return for a political settlement that would exclude the Khmer Rouge from power, the rebel coalition government as well as ASEAN, China and the United States, insisted that such a condition was unacceptable. Nevertheless, Vietnam declared in 1985 that it would complete the withdrawal of its forces from Cambodia by 1990 and it did so in September 1989, having allowed the Cambodian People's Party government that it had installed there to consolidate its rule and gain sufficient military strength.

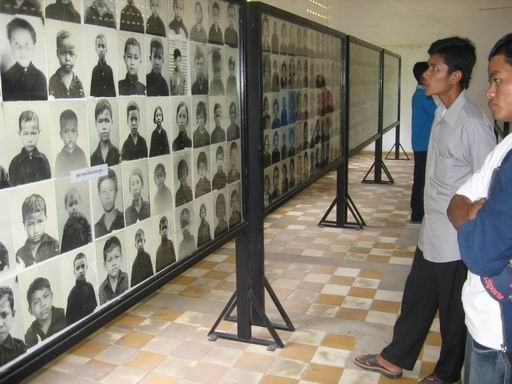
Photos of the victims of the Khmer Rouge

After a decade of inconclusive conflict, the pro-Vietnamese Cambodian government and the rebel coalition signed a treaty in 1991 calling for elections and disarmament. However, the Khmer Rouge resumed fighting in 1992, boycotted the election and in the following year rejected its results. It began fighting the Cambodian coalition government which included the former Vietnamese-backed communists (headed by Hun Sen) as well as the Khmer Rouge's former non-communist and monarchist allies (notably Prince Rannaridh). In 1993, after a transition period and free elections, the Kingdom of Cambodia was restored, replacing the communist regime; however, the Khmer Rouge rebels opposed the new regime and established its own government in 1994.

Ieng Sary led a mass defection from the Khmer Rouge in 1996, with half of its remaining soldiers (about 4,000) switching to the government side and Ieng Sary becoming leader of Pailin Province. A conflict between the two main participants in the ruling coalition caused in 1997 Prince Rannaridh to seek support from some of the Khmer Rouge leaders while refusing to have any dealings with Pol Pot. This resulted in bloody factional fighting among the Khmer Rouge leaders, ultimately leading to Pol Pot's trial and imprisonment by the Khmer Rouge. Pol Pot died in April 1998. Khieu Samphan and Nuon Chea surrendered in December 1998. On 29 December 1998, leaders of the Khmer Rouge apologised for the 1970s genocide. By 1998, the Khmer Rouge was almost wiped out and it dissolved its government. Its last guerrillas surrendered to the Cambodian government on 9 February 1999, ending the remnants of communism in Cambodia. As a result, the government incorporated the last remnants of the Khmer Rouge into Cambodian army on 12 February.

== Legacy ==
Cambodia has been described as the black sheep of Southeast Asia because extremism is condoned in a country which is characterized by very weak economic growth and extensive poverty. Both demographically and economically, Cambodia has gradually recovered from the rule of the Khmer Rouge regime, but the psychological scars affect many Cambodian families and they also affect many émigré Cambodian communities. It is noteworthy that Cambodia has a very young population, and by 2003, three-quarters of Cambodians were too young to remember the Khmer Rouge era. Nonetheless, their generation is affected by the traumas of the past. Members of this younger generation may know about the Khmer Rouge only through word of mouth from their parents and elders. In part, young Cambodians lack knowledge about the Khmer Rouge because the Cambodian government does not require educators to teach Cambodian children about the Khmer Rouge's atrocities in Cambodian schools; however, Cambodia's Education Ministry started to teach Khmer Rouge history in high schools beginning in 2009.

=== Extraordinary Chambers in the Courts of Cambodia ===
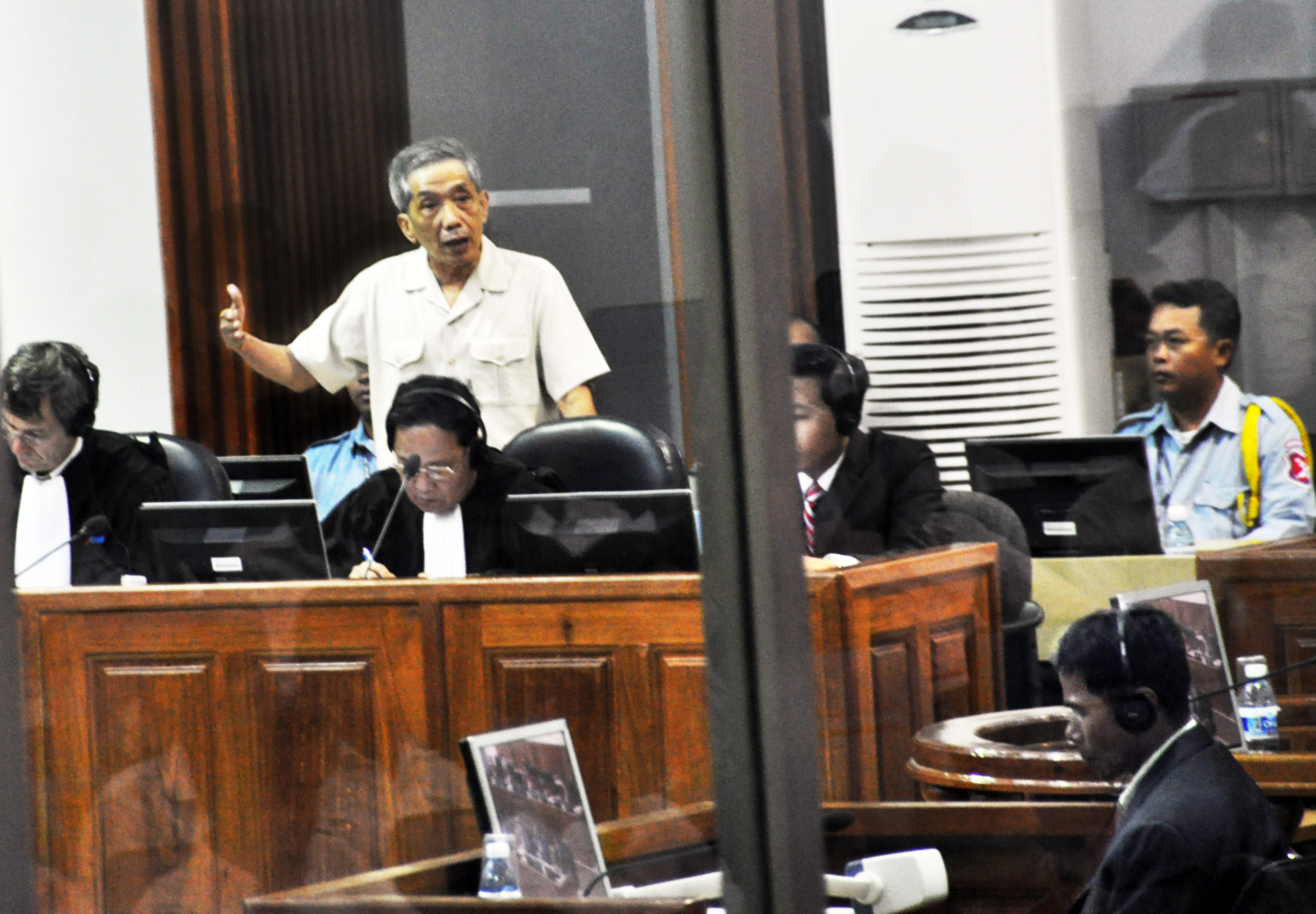
Kang Kek Iew before the Khmer Rouge Tribunal on 20 July 2009

The Extraordinary Chambers in the Courts of Cambodia (ECCC), also known as the Khmer Rouge Tribunal, was established as a Cambodian court with international participation and assistance to bring to trial senior leaders and those most responsible for crimes committed during the Khmer Rouge regime. As of 2020, there are three open cases. ECCC's efforts for outreach toward both national and international audience include public trial hearings, study tours, video screenings, school lectures and video archives on the web site.

After claiming to feel great remorse for his part in Khmer Rouge atrocities, Kang Kek Iew—the head of Security Prison 21, where 16,000 men, women and children were sent to their deaths—surprised the court in his trial on 27 November 2009 with a plea for his freedom. His Cambodian lawyer, Kar Savuth, stunned the tribunal further by issuing the trial's first call for an acquittal of his client even after his French lawyer denied seeking such a verdict. On 26 July 2010, he was convicted and sentenced to thirty years imprisonment. Theary Seng responded: "We hoped this tribunal would strike hard at impunity, but if you can kill 14,000 people and serve only 19 years – 11 hours per life taken – what is that? It's a joke", voicing concerns about political interference. In February 2012, Duch's sentence was increased to life imprisonment following appeals by both the prosecution and defence. In dismissing the defence's appeal, Judge Kong Srim stated that Duch's crimes were "undoubtedly among the worst in recorded human history" and deserved "the highest penalty available".

From 2007 to 2022, public trial hearings in Phnom Penh were open to all adults including foreigners. The court provided free bus transportation for groups of Cambodians who wanted to visit the court. Since the commencement of the Case 001 trial in 2009 through the end of 2011, 53,287 people participated in the public hearings. The ECCC also has hosted a study tour program to help villagers in rural areas understand the history of the Khmer Rouge regime. The court has provided free transport for them to come to visit the court and meet with court officials to learn about its work, in addition to visits to the genocide museum and the killing fields. ECCC also has visited villages to provide video screenings and school lectures to promote their understanding of the trial proceedings. Furthermore, trials and transcripts are partially available with English translation on the ECCC's website.

=== Museums ===
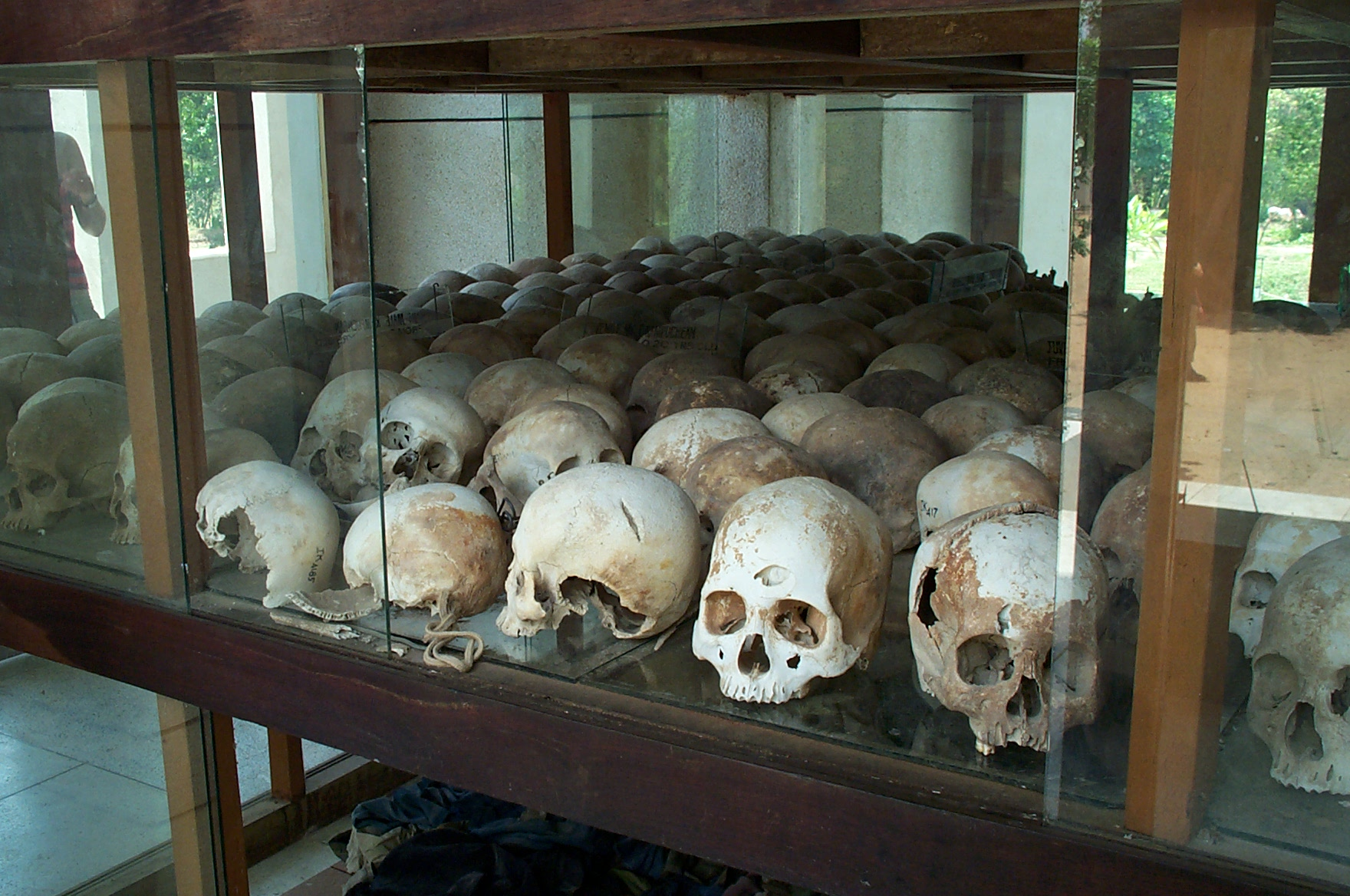
Skulls displayed in the memorial tower

The Tuol Sleng Genocide Museum is a former secondary school building, which was transformed into a torture, interrogation and execution center between 1976 and 1979. The Khmer Rouge called it Security Prison 21. Of the estimated 15,000 to 30,000 prisoners, only seven prisoners survived. The Khmer Rouge photographed the vast majority of the inmates and left a photographic archive, which enables visitors to see almost 6,000 S-21 portraits on the walls. Visitors can also learn how the inmates were tortured from the equipment and facilities exhibited in the buildings.

The Choeung Ek Killing Fields are located about 15 kilometers outside of Phnom Penh. Most of the prisoners who were held captive at S-21 were taken to the fields to be executed and deposited in one of the approximately 129 mass graves. It is estimated that the graves contain the remains of over 20,000 victims. After the discovery of the site in 1979, the Vietnamese transformed the site into a memorial and stored skulls and bones in an open-walled wooden memorial pavilion. Eventually, these remains were showcased in the memorial's centerpiece Buddhist stupa.

In 2025, three sites associated with the Khmer Rouge's atrocities (the Tuol Sleng Genocide Museum, Choeung Ek, and M-13 prison in Kampong Chhnang province) were designated as World Heritage Sites by UNESCO as part of the Cambodian Memorial Sites.

=== Publications ===
The Documentation Center of Cambodia (DC-Cam), an independent research institute, published A History of Democratic Kampuchea (1975–1979), the nation's first textbook on the history of the Khmer Rouge. The 74-page textbook was approved by the government as a supplementary text in 2007. The textbook is aiming at standardising and improving the information students receive about the Khmer Rouge years because the government-issued social studies textbook devotes eight or nine pages to the period. The publication was a part of their genocide education project that includes leading the design of a national genocide studies curriculum with the Ministry of Education, training thousands of teachers and 1,700 high schools on how to teach about genocide and working with universities across Cambodia.

Youth for Peace, a Cambodian non-governmental organization (NGO) that offers education in peace, leadership, conflict resolution and reconciliation to Cambodia's youth, published a book titled Behind the Darkness: Taking Responsibility or Acting Under Orders? in 2011. The book is unique in that instead of focusing on the victims as most books do, it collects the stories of former Khmer Rouge, giving insights into the functioning of the regime and approaching the question of how such a regime could take place.

=== Dialogues ===
While the tribunal contributes to the memorialization process at national level, some civil society groups promote memorialization at community level. The International Center for Conciliation (ICfC) began working in Cambodia in 2004 as a branch of the ICfC in Boston. ICfC launched the Justice and History Outreach project in 2007 and has worked in villages in rural Cambodia with the goal of creating mutual understanding and empathy between victims and former members of the Khmer Rouge. Following the dialogues, villagers identify their own ways of memorialization such as collecting stories to be transmitted to the younger generations or building a memorial. Through the process, some villagers are beginning to accept the possibility of an alternative viewpoint to the traditional notions of evil associated with anyone who worked for the Khmer Rouge regime.

=== Media coverage ===
Radio National Kampuchea as well as private radio stations broadcast programmes on the Khmer Rouge and trials. ECCC has its own weekly radio program on RNK which provides an opportunity for the public to interact with court officials and deepen their understanding of cases.

Youth for Peace, a Cambodian NGO that offers education in peace, leadership, conflict resolution and reconciliation to Cambodian's youth, has broadcast the weekly radio program, You Also Have a Chance since 2009. Aiming at preventing the passing on of hatred and violence to future generations, the program allows former Khmer Rouge to talk anonymously about their past experience.

== See also ==
- Cambodian genocide
- Cambodian genocide denial
- Cambodia Tribunal
- Criticism of communist party rule
- Genocides in history
- Killing Fields
- Mass killings under communist regimes
