= Documentation Center of Cambodia =

Documentation Center of Cambodia (DC-Cam)
- Founded: 1995 by Yale University's Cambodian Genocide Program; Became independent in 1997
- Type: Non-profit; NGO
- Location(s): Phnom Penh, Cambodia Satellite office in Rutgers University
- Services: Research, outreach, education
- Fields: Documenting human rights abuses
- Website: http://www.dccam.org

The Documentation Center of Cambodia (DC-Cam) is a Cambodian non-governmental organization whose mission is to research and record the era of Democratic Kampuchea (April 17, 1975 – January 7, 1979) for the purposes of memory and justice.

== History ==
In 1994, the United States Congress passed the Cambodian Genocide Justice Act which provided grants to Yale University's Cambodian Genocide Program. DC-Cam was the field office of the Yale program until January 1, 1997, when it became an independent non-governmental organization.

== Organization ==
The center presently contains the world's largest archive on the Khmer Rouge period with over 155,000 pages of documents and 6,000 photographs. DC-Cam undertakes numerous research, outreach, and educational projects which have resulted in the publication of many books on the Khmer Rouge period, a national genocide education initiative, and support services for victims and survivors of the Khmer Rouge regime. DC-Cam is recognized as one of the leading research centers on the Cambodian genocide.

In August 2006, former U.S. ambassador to Cambodia Joseph Mussomeli honored the staff and volunteers of DC-Cam at the U.S. Embassy in Phnom Penh for their work in documenting the crimes of Democratic Kampuchea. In 2007, DC-Cam's director Youk Chhang was named one of Time magazine's "100 Most Influential People" of 2007 in their "Heroes and Pioneers" section. The text for Time's article on Chhang was written by Senator John Kerry. In the same year, DC-Cam published its first textbook on the Khmer Rouge period, A History of Democratic Kampuchea (1975–1979).

== See also ==
- Bibliography of the Cambodian genocide
- Cambodian genocide denial
