= Huot =

Huot may refer to:

- Huot, Minnesota, an historic river crossing and site in Northwest Minnesota, now a ghost town
- Old Crossing Treaty Park, a county park in Red Lake County, Minnesota
- Huot automatic rifle, a Canadian automatic weapons program

== People ==
- Benoit Huot (born 1984), Canadian Paralympic swimmer
- Chhor Leang Huot, Cambodian politician
- François Huot (1756–1822), Canadian businessman and political figure
- Hector-Simon Huot (1803–1846), Canadian lawyer and politician
- Hong Sun Huot, Cambodian Minister of Health and Chairman of the National AIDS Authority
- Huot Vuthy, Cambodian judge
- Isabelle Huot, Canadian nutritionist and professional dietitian
- Jean Jacques Nicolas Huot (1790—1845), French geographer, geologist and naturalist
- Jessica Huot (born 1983), Finnish figure skater
- Joseph Oliva Huot (1917–1983), American politician
- Marcel Huot (1896—1954), French professional road bicycle racer
- Marie Huot (1846–1930), French poet, writer, feminist and animal rights activist
- Marie-Catherine Huot (1791–1869), Canadian mother superior
- Patrick Huot (born 1975), Canadian politician
- Pierre-Gabriel Huot (1825–1913), Quebec journalist and political figure
- Sylvia Huot, English professor and author
- Try Chheang Huot (died 2015), Cambodian politician
- Victor Huot (1822–1904), French-born American architect, builder
- Victor Huot, French cartographer
- Ung Huot (born 1947), Cambodian political figure
