= SRIM =

SRIM may refer to:

- Stopping and Range of Ions in Matter
- Structural reaction injection molding, a specialized type of injection molding for reinforced thermosets

== See also ==
- Kong Srim, Cambodian judge
