= Im Chaem =

Cambodian politician

Personal details
- Born: 1946 Cheang Tong Commune, Tram Kak District, Takéo province, Cambodia

Im Chaem (Khmer: អ៊ឹម ចែម; born 1946) is a Cambodian politician. She was a district governor for the Khmer Rouge during the period of Democratic Kampuchea.

== Life ==
Chaem was born in Kbal Ou village, Cheang Tong Commune, Tram Kak District, Takéo province. She was raised Buddhist.

Chaem first worked in the Southwest Zone during its period of forced collectivization. She and her husband, Nob Nhem, had seven children.

In 1977, according to prosecutors, Chaem and fellow Khmer Rouge official Yim Tith were sent to the northwest region of the country "to purge cadres seen as traitorous". There, Chaem oversaw the construction of the Spean Spreng dam, Trapeang Thma dam, and Prey Roneam reservoir in Banteay Meanchey province, which were meant to increase rice production in the province. Reports of conditions at the worksites differ; prosecutors allege that one of the dams was built by hand by underfed workers, while Chaem maintains "that poor conditions were endemic" and she treated her workers better than previous officials. She worked directly under Ta Mok.

After the Khmer Rouge fell, Chaem moved to Anlong Veng, "the movement's last stronghold". Beginning in 1998, Chaem served as a local official in the Cambodian People's Party.

She converted to Christianity in November 2017, and was baptized in January 2018. Her husband and children also converted. Her pastor, Christopher LaPel, was a survivor of a forced labor camp which she allegedly oversaw. Chaem has said she became interested in Christianity after one of her sons, who had already converted, was healed of a long-standing illness.

As of 2018, Chaem lives in Anlong Veng District with her husband and daughter.

== Tribunal charges ==
In March 2015, the Extraordinary Chambers in the Courts of Cambodia (ECCC) charged Chaem with "crimes against humanity" and "grave breaches of the Geneva Conventions of 1949" for alleged actions she took in 1977-1978 while secretary of Preah Netr Preah district and deputy secretary of Northwest Zone Sector 5. The ECCC says the alleged crimes took place in "Sector 13 of the Southwest Zone" and "Sector 5 of the Northwest Zone". According to the court, Chaem was alleged of directly overseeing Spean Sraeng and Phnom Trayoung prison, where around 40,000 people were killed or died due to starvation and overwork between 1977-1979. Prosecutors suggested she and Yim Tith may have been responsible for "as many as 560,000 deaths".

The court's investigation concluded in late 2015.

In 2017, the ECCC voted they had no authority to prosecute Chaem because she was not "a person 'most responsible' for atrocities". The decision drew criticism from ADHOC, the Center for Justice and Accountability, and Human Rights Watch Asia.

Chaem has consistently denied the allegations and any wrongdoing.
