= Steven J. Bwana =

Steven Bwana is a Tanzanian judge and reserve member of the Khmer Rouge Tribunal. He was a registrar of the Court of Appeal of Tanzania (1990-1994), and Judge in Charge of the Commercial Division of the High Court of Tanzania from 1999 to 2006. He was a Justice of Appeals in the Court of Appeal of Tanzania.
