= Ya Narin =

Ya Narin is a Cambodian judge and member of the Khmer Rouge Tribunal. He is president of the Mondulkiri Court and was formerly president of the Rattanakiri Court. He has a PhD in criminology from the State and Law Institute of Kazakhstan.
