= Marie-Victoire Baudry =

Marie-Victoire Baudry (12 December 1782 – 10 November 1846), named Mother de la Croix, was Superior General of the Congregation of Notre Dame.

== Life ==
Baudry was born on 12 December 1782 in the town of Pointe-aux-Trembles (now part of Montreal), the daughter of Toussaint Baudry and Élisabeth Truteau. Baudry went to a convent school in the town and later entered the noviciate of the Congregation of Notre Dame which had taught her, at Montreal in 1799. She was the first native of the colony to enter the congregation. A year later, she took her vows and assumed her religious name, after which she began a teaching career at a mission on the Island of Montreal. She later moved to Lower Town mission at Quebec.

Because of circumstances within her congregation, she left teaching and became involved in the internal administration of the institute. She became Superior General in 1822 for a six-year term and was succeeded by Mother Marie-Catherine Huot. She was elected councillor at that time and continued in that post until her death.

Mother de la Croix went on to set up new missions and strongly influenced the curriculum in the schools of the congregation. She died at the Motherhouse of the congregation in Montreal in 1846.
