= Mong Monichariya =

Cambodian judge

Mong Monichariya is a Cambodian judge and member of the Khmer Rouge Tribunal. He has been a judge of the Supreme Court since 2002. He studied law in Kazakhstan, and received the degree of Master of Arts in Law from Kazakhstan National University in 1993.
