= Som Sereyvuth =

Cambodian judge

Som Sereyvuth is a Cambodian judge and member of the Khmer Rouge Tribunal. He was appointed a judge of the Supreme Court of Cambodia in 1988.
