= Khmer Rouge Tribunal =

Cambodian–UN court established in 1997 to try Khmer Rouge leaders

Extraordinary Chambers in the Courts of Cambodia Chambres extraordinaires au sein des tribunaux cambodgiens (French) អង្គជំនុំជម្រះវិសាមញ្ញក្នុងតុលាការកម្ពុជា (Khmer)
- Emblem of the Khmer Rouge Tribunal
- Interactive map of Extraordinary Chambers in the Courts of Cambodia Chambres extraordinaires au sein des tribunaux cambodgiens (French) អង្គជំនុំជម្រះវិសាមញ្ញក្នុងតុលាការកម្ពុជា (Khmer)
- Established: 1997
- Dissolved: 2022
- Jurisdiction: Supreme Court of Cambodia
- Location: Phnom Penh
- Authorised by: Parliamentary Act
- Website: www.eccc.gov.kh/en

President
- Currently: Judge Kong Srim

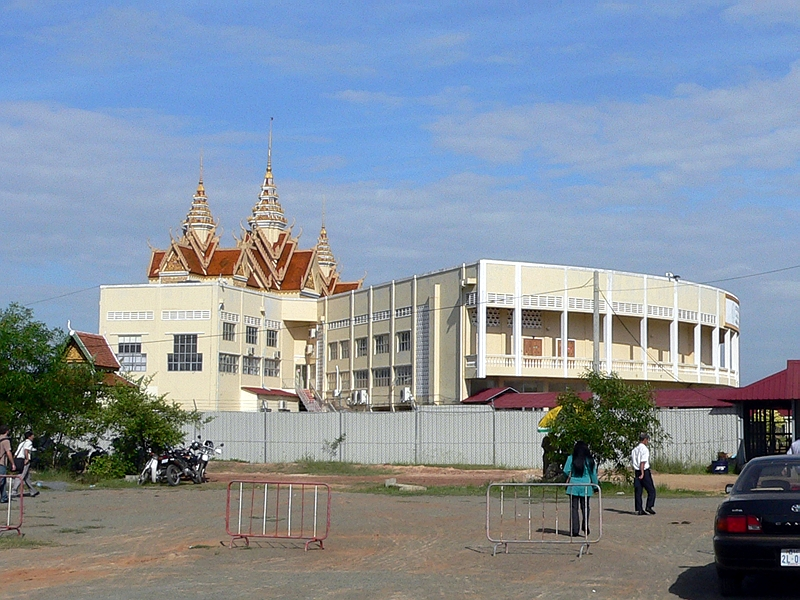
The tribunal's main building with the court room

The Extraordinary Chambers in the Courts of Cambodia (ECCC; French: Chambres extraordinaires au sein des tribunaux cambodgiens (CETC); Khmer: អង្គជំនុំជម្រះវិសាមញ្ញក្នុងតុលាការកម្ពុជា), commonly known as the Cambodia Tribunal or Khmer Rouge Tribunal (សាលាក្ដីខ្មែរក្រហម), was a court established to try the senior leaders and the most responsible members of the Khmer Rouge for alleged violations of international law and serious crimes perpetrated during the Cambodian genocide. Although it was a national court, it was established as part of an agreement between the Royal Government of Cambodia and the United Nations, and its members included both local and foreign judges. It was considered a hybrid court, as the ECCC was created by the government in conjunction with the UN, but remained independent of them, with trials being held in Cambodia using Cambodian and international staff. The Cambodian court invited international participation in order to apply international standards.

The remit of the Extraordinary Chambers extended to serious violations of Cambodian penal law, international humanitarian law and custom, and violation of international conventions recognized by Cambodia, committed during the period between 17 April 1975 and 6 January 1979. This includes crimes against humanity, war crimes and genocide. The chief purpose of the tribunal as identified by the Extraordinary Chambers was to provide justice to the Cambodian people who were victims of the Khmer Rouge regime's policies between April 1975 and January 1979. However, rehabilitative victim support and media outreach for the purpose of national education were also outlined as primary goals of the commission.

Upon the denial of Khieu Samphan's appeal, and with no other living senior members of the Khmer Rouge to indict, the tribunal concluded in December 2022, with three convictions in all.

== Origin ==
In 1997, Cambodia's co-prime ministers Norodom Ranariddh and Hun Sen wrote a letter to the Secretary-General of the United Nations, Kofi Annan, requesting assistance to set up trial proceedings against the senior leaders of the Khmer Rouge. After lengthy negotiations, an agreement between the Royal Government of Cambodia and the United Nations was reached and signed on 6 June 2003. The agreement was endorsed by the United Nations General Assembly.

In May 2006, Justice Minister Ang Vong Vathana announced that Cambodia's highest judicial body approved 30 Cambodian and United Nations judges to preside over the long-awaited genocide tribunal for surviving Khmer Rouge leaders. The judges were sworn in early July 2006.

In June 2009, the international Co-Prosecutor Robert Petit resigned from his assignment due to "personal and familial reasons". In November of the same year, Andrew T. Cayley was appointed as new international Co-Prosecutor, and his Cambodian co-prosecutor is Chea Leang.

== Judicial chambers ==
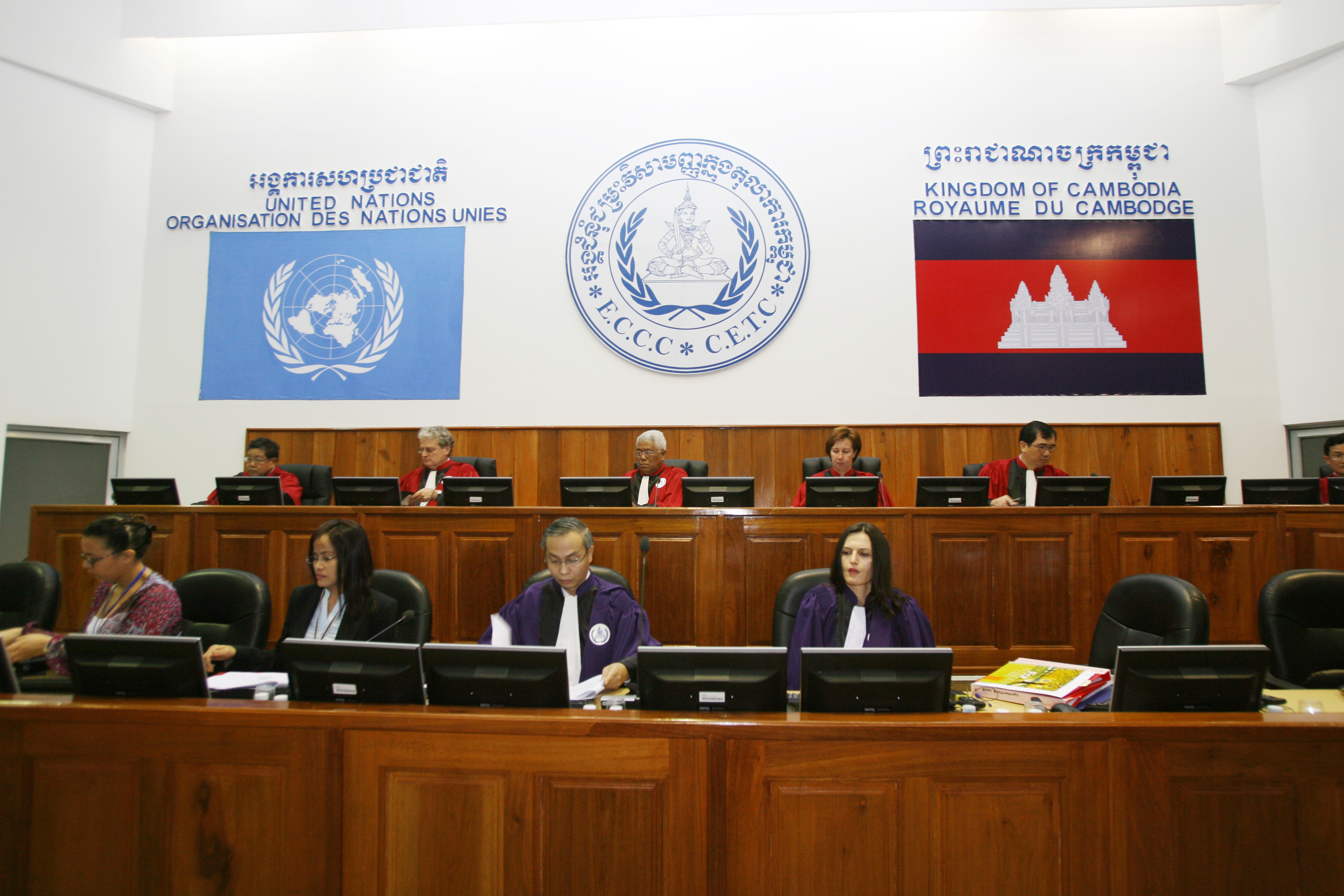
Ieng Sary pre-trial detention hearing on 11 February 2010

Under the agreement between Cambodia and the UN, the tribunal was composed of both local and international judges. Due to Cambodia's predominantly French legal heritage, investigations were performed by the Investigating Judges, who would conduct investigations and submit a closing order stating whether or not the case would proceed to trial.

Both the Pre-Trial Chamber and the Trial Chamber were composed of three Cambodian and two international judges, while a Supreme Court Chamber was made up of four Cambodian judges and three international judges.

All international judges were appointed by the Supreme Council of the Magistracy of Cambodia from a list of nominees submitted by the Secretary-General of the United Nations. There were also Reserve judges who were sometimes called upon to serve.

The judges were:

Supreme Court Chamber

Name	Country of origin
Maureen Harding Clark	Ireland
Chandra Nihal Jayasinghe	Sri Lanka
Florence Mumba	Zambia
Kong Srim (President)	Cambodia
Som Sereyvuth	Cambodia
Mong Monichariya	Cambodia
Ya Narin	Cambodia
Philip Rapoza : Reserve	United States of America
Sin Rith : Reserve	Cambodia

Trial Chamber

Name	Country of origin
Claudia Fenz	Austria
Martin Karopkin	United States of America
Nil Nonn (President)	Cambodia
You Ottara	Cambodia
Ya Sokhan	Cambodia
Thou Mony : Reserve	Cambodia

Pre-Trial Chamber

Name	Country of origin
Olivier Beauvallet	France
Baik Kang Jin	South Korea
Prak Kimsan (President)	Cambodia
Huot Vuthy	Cambodia
Ney Thol	Cambodia
Pen Pichsaly : Reserve	Cambodia
Steven J. Bwana : Reserve	Tanzania

== Organs of the ECCC ==
Office of the Co-Prosecutors

The Office of the Co-Prosecutors (OCP) was an independent office within the ECCC staffed by both Cambodian and international personnel provided by the United Nations Assistance to the Khmer Rouge Trials (UNAKRT). The OCP was headed by the Cambodian National Co-Prosecutor (appointed by the Supreme Council of the Magistracy of Cambodia) and the International Co-Prosecutor (nominated by the United Nations Secretary-General), who served as co-prosecutors. The role of the OCP was to prosecute the senior leaders of the Khmer Rouge and others most responsible for the crimes committed during the period of Democratic Kampuchea. The OCP was responsible for the prosecution of cases throughout the investigative, pre-trial, trial and appellate stages. The OCP processed victim complaints; conducted the preliminary investigations (first investigatory stage); and issues Introductory Submissions to the Office of Co-Investigating Judges where there was sufficient evidence of crimes within the jurisdiction of the ECCC having been committed. Introductory Submissions set out the facts, applicable law, alleged offences, and person(s) to be investigated. The OCP also participated in the judicial investigations (second investigatory stage), filing Supplementary Submissions as necessary when new facts came to light and original allegations required additions or amendments.

Co-Prosecutors

- Brenda Hollis, International Co-Prosecutor
- Chea Leang, National Co-Prosecutor

Office of Co-Investigating Judges

The Office of Co-Investigating Judges (OCIJ) undertook pre-trial investigations of the facts alleged by the Co-Prosecutors in their Introductory and Supplementary Submissions to determine whether the person(s) under investigation were to be indicted and sent to trial, or whether the case against them should be dismissed.

Co-Investigating Judges

- Michael Bohlander, International Co-Investigating Judge
- You Bunleng, National Co-Investigating Judge

Defence Support Section

The Defence Support Section (DSS) was responsible for providing indigent defendants with a list of lawyers who could defend them, for providing legal support and administrative support to lawyers assigned to represent individual defendants, and for promoting fair trial rights. The DSS also acted as a voice for the defence in the media and at outreach events, and organised a legacy program. The DSS legacy program was designed to increase understanding of the criminal trial process and the right to a fair trial within Cambodia. The program provided an opportunity for Cambodian law students and lawyers to gain experience practicing international law in the hopes that the court will lead to a lasting improvement in the Cambodian legal system.

Author Mary Kozlovski addresses problems at the Court, including issues impacting fair trial rights, in an essay entitled Bringing the Khmer Rouge to Justice in the June 2012 issue of Global Insight, the journal of the International Bar Association (IBA).

Heads of the DSS

- Isaac Endeley (April 2012 – 2022)
- Nisha Valabhji (Officer-in-Charge, March 2011 – March 2012)
- Rupert Abbott (Officer-in-Charge) (November 2010 – February 2011)
- Richard Rogers (August 2008 – November 2010)
- Rupert Skilbeck (August 2006 – August 2008)

Victims Support Section

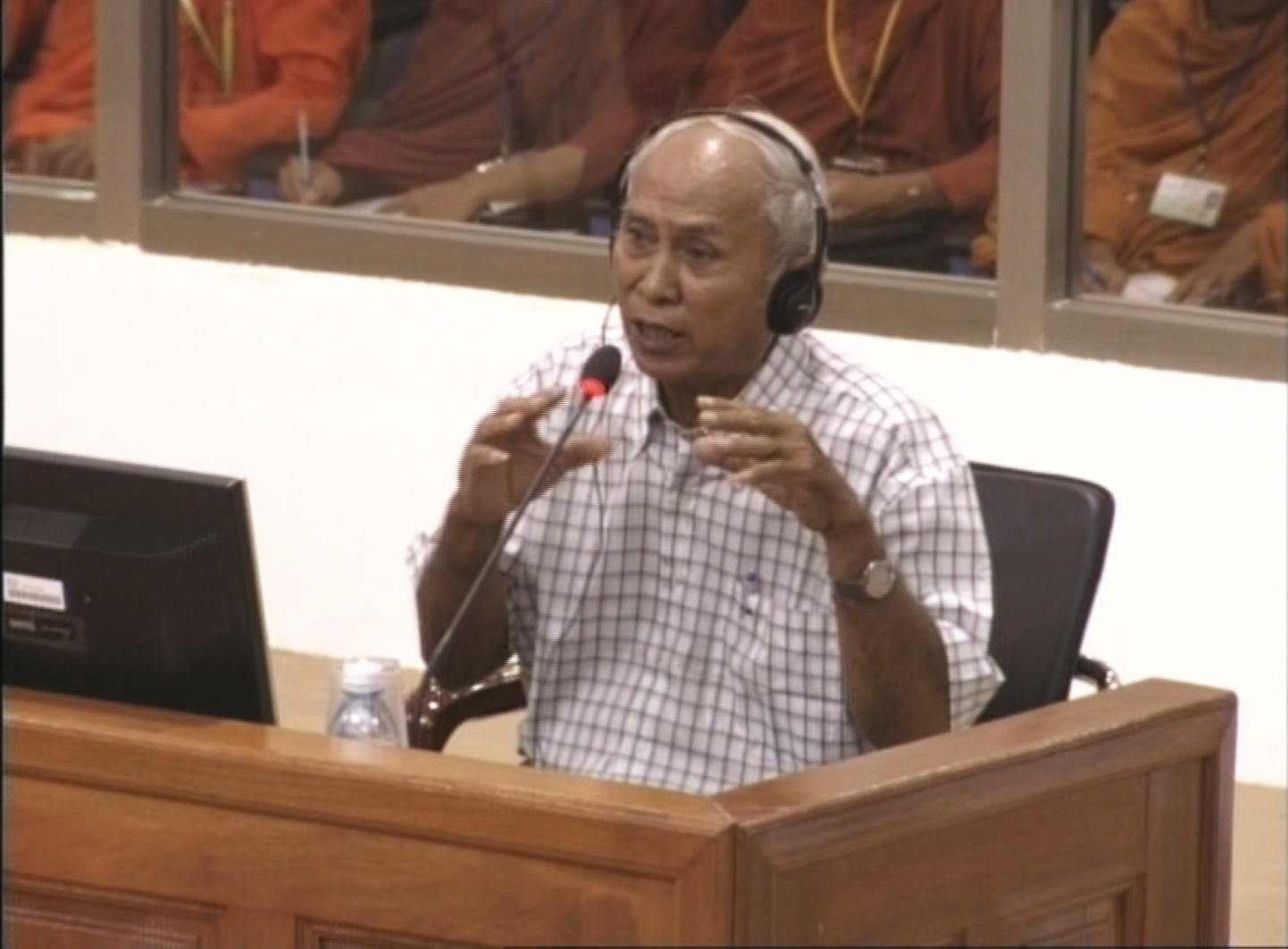
Chum Mey is one of only seven known survivors of the Khmer Rouge imprisonment in the S-21 Tuol Sleng camp.

The Victims Support Section (VSS) served as the liaison between the ECCC and the victims or their representatives. Through the VSS, victims had the ability to seek support and assistance by participating in the ECCC's proceedings as Complainants or Civil Parties. The VSS was responsible for informing victims of their rights in the proceedings, and connecting them with legal representatives if they desire it. Thus, victims were formally recognized as parties of the proceedings and eligible for either collective or individual reparations for damages caused during the regime. The VSS also ensured the safety and protection of its participants. This support and protection could be either physical protection for providing key testimony, or emotion support in the form of psychiatric help and assistance. In early 2012, Germany donated 1.2 million euros to the VSS. This marks Germany's fourth donation to the VSS since its official recognition as an organ of the ECCC. The financial assistance went primarily towards legal representation for the victims, effective legal participation, and information dissemination. Germany donated in total 1.9 million euro to the VSS.

Office of Administration

The Office of Administration oversaw the Budget and Finance, Information and Communication Technology, Security and Safety, General Services, Public Affairs, and Personnel units of the ECCC and was responsible for supporting and facilitating the judicial process through the effective, efficient and coordinated provision of services. The office was also responsible for managing the ECCC's relationships with UNAKRT donors.

Directors of the Office of Administration

- Kranh Tony, Acting Director
- Knut Røsandhaug, Deputy Director

- Budget and Finance:
The Budget and Finance sections were charged with the financial management and disbursement of the ECCC. Donations were managed through these offices and disbursed accordingly, and any budget adjustments and financial reports were put forth by these offices.

- Court Management:
The Court Management section of the Office of Administration was responsible for running the Witness and Expert Support Unit, the Transcription Unit in charge of recording the Court's proceedings, the Translation and Interpretation Unit, the Audio Visual Unit and the Library unit, which provided lawyers and other persons in the court with access to research material to aid them in their proceedings. The Court Management Section was responsible for running these offices in order to ensure the functionality of the judicial process of the ECCC and securing the necessary means for documentation of the process.

- General Services:
The General Services Unit was responsible for any logistical needs of the court, both national and international and therefore included the Building Unit, Travel Unit, Transport Unit, Asset Management Unit, Supply Unit, Mail and Pouch Unit and the Procurement Unit.

- Information and Communication Technology:
The Information and Communication Technology section was responsible for maintaining a secure network for the ECCC as well as providing and maintaining equipment necessary for ECCC staff.

- Personnel:
The Personnel section contained both national and international sections. They were in charge of all human resources needs including developing and maintaining policies, procedures and manuals for personnel conduct, and providing administrative management to personnel and staff information to the Office of Administration as a whole.

- Public Affairs:
The Public Affairs section was responsible for all ECCC public relations needs including outreach and information, media relations and the distribution audio/visual recordings of the trials.

- Security and Safety:
The Security and Safety section was responsible for any security needs of the ECCC and protection of personnel and the Court's perimeter.

== Jurisdiction and applicable law ==
The Law on the Establishment of the Extraordinary Chambers in the Courts of Cambodia for the Prosecution of Crimes Committed During the Period of Democratic Kampuchea established the crimes over which the Court has jurisdiction. It had jurisdiction over certain crimes that violate the 1956 Penal Code of Cambodia, crimes under the Convention on the Prevention and Punishment of the Crime of Genocide, general crimes against humanity, crimes under the Geneva Conventions (war crimes), crimes under the Hague Convention for the Protection of Cultural Property in the Event of Armed Conflict, and crimes under the Vienna Convention on Diplomatic Relations. If found guilty, criminals could be sentenced to prison or have their property confiscated. The Court, as with all other tribunals established by the United Nations, didn't have the power to impose the death penalty. Five people had been indicted by the Court for genocide, crimes against humanity and/or war crimes. Three had been convicted and all sentenced to life imprisonment.

== Victims' role ==
Victims of the Khmer Rouge were defined as "any person or legal entity who has suffered from physical, psychological, or material harm as a direct consequence of the crimes committed in Cambodia by the Democratic Kampuchea regime between 17 April 1975 and 6 January 1979 that are under the jurisdiction of the ECCC". The rights provided to the victims in regards to the ECCC were stated in the Cambodian Law under the Internal Rules of the ECCC. Victims had the opportunity to actively participate in judicial proceedings through Complaints and Civil Parties, and they could seek collective and moral reparation.

The victims' role was crucial since the tribunal was an important mechanism for them to cope with their trauma. “The tribunal facilitates reconciliation and at the same time provides an opportunity for Cambodians to come to terms with their history,” ECCC spokesman Neth Pheaktra said in an interview with D+C.

== Charged persons and Indictees ==
=== Overview ===
The list below details the counts against each individual indicted in the Court and his or her current status. The column titled CCL lists the number of counts (if any) of crimes under Cambodian law with which an individual has been charged. G the number of counts of the crime of genocide, H the number of counts of crimes against humanity, W the number of counts of war crimes, DCP the number of counts of destruction of cultural property, and CAD the number of crimes against diplomats. Note that these are the counts with which an individual was indicted, not convicted.

Name	Indicted	CCL	G	H	W	DCP	CAD	Transferred to the ECCC	Current status	Ind.
Kang Kek Iew	31 July 2007	—	—	8	5	—	—	31 July 2007	Served sentence of life imprisonment in Cambodia until his death on 2 September 2020	
Nuon Chea	15 September 2010	3	2	12	6	—	—	19 September 2007	Served sentence of life imprisonment in Cambodia until his death on 4 August 2019; remaining proceedings terminated on 13 August 2019	
Khieu Samphan	15 September 2010	3	2	12	6	—	—	19 November 2007	Serving sentence of life imprisonment	
Ieng Sary	15 September 2010	3	2	12	6	—	—	12 November 2007	Died on 14 March 2013; proceedings terminated on 14 March 2013	
Ieng Thirith	15 September 2010	3	6	40	27	—	—	12 November 2007	Died on 22 August 2015; proceedings terminated on 22 August 2015	
Im Chaem	N/A	—	—	—	—	—	—	—	Proceedings terminated on 28 June 2018	N/A
Ao An	16 August 2018	1	2	41	—	—	—	—	Proceedings terminated on 10 August 2020	Indictment by the International Co-Investigating Judge Dismissal Order by the National Co-Investigating Judge
Meas Muth	28 November 2018	1	1	53	2	—	—	—	Pre-Trial Chamber's Considerations on the Appeals against the Closing Orders issued on 7 April 2021	Indictment by the International Co-Investigating Judge Dismissal Order by the National Co-Investigating Judge
Yim Tith	28 June 2019	1	1	24	4	—	—	—	Pre-Trial Chamber's Considerations on the Appeals against the Closing Orders issued on 17 September 2021	Indictment by the International Co-Investigating Judge Dismissal Order by the National Co-Investigating Judge

=== Kang Kek Iew ===
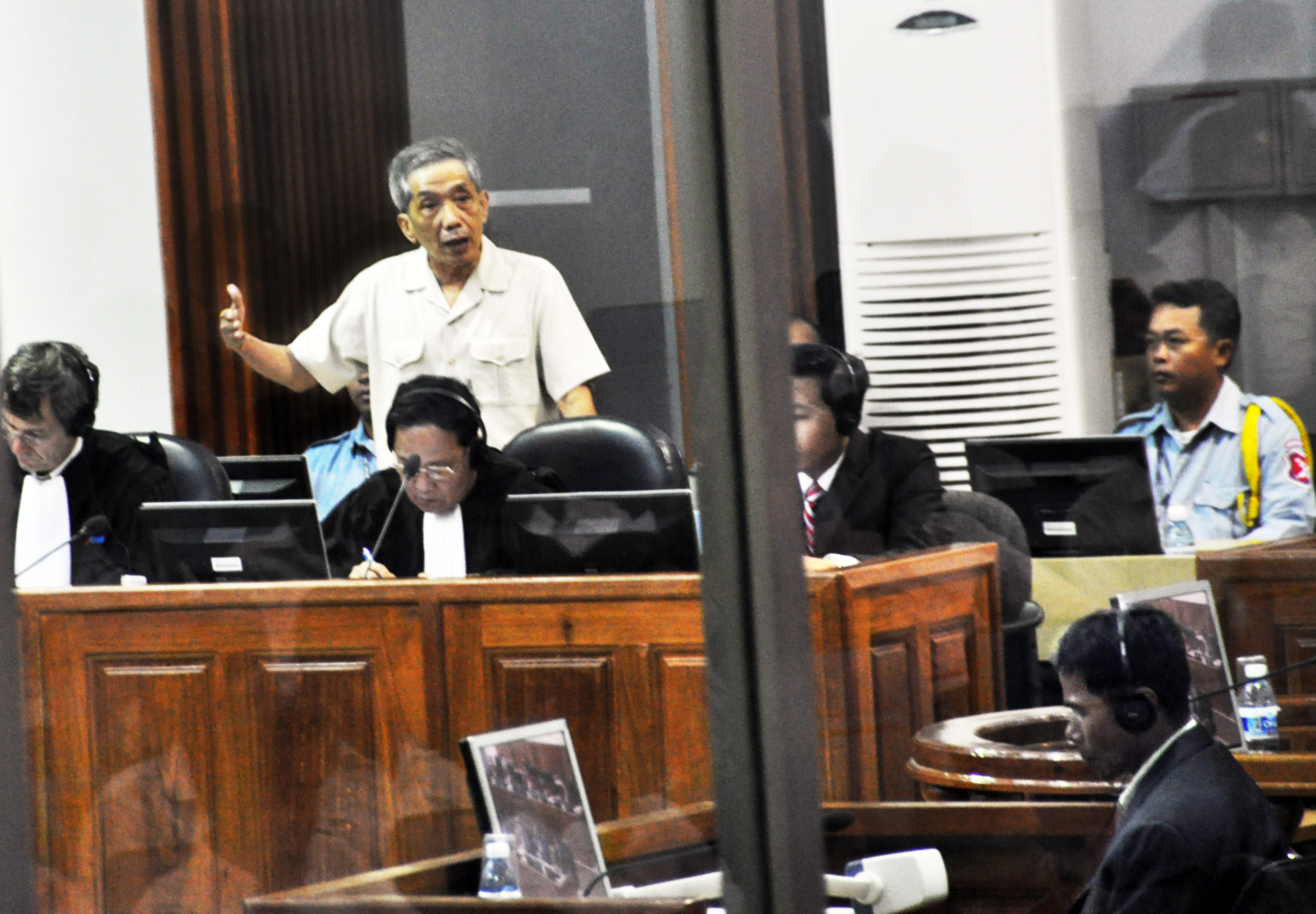
Kang Kek Iew before the tribunal on 20 July 2009

Kang Kek Iew, or "Comrade Duch", was one of the leaders of the Khmer Rouge. He headed the Santebal—a special branch of the Khmer Rouge in charge of internal security and running prison camps. In addition, Iew ran the notorious Tuol Sleng (S-21) prison in Phnom Penh.

Iew was the first of the five brought before the tribunal. His hearings began on 17 September 2009 and concluded on 27 November 2010. Seven areas of relevance resurfaced frequently during his trial: issues relating to M-13, the establishment of S-21 and the Takmao prison, the implementation of CPK policy at S-21, armed conflict, the functioning of S-21, the establishment and functioning of S-24; and issues relating to character of Iew himself. His lieutenant Mam Nay, the feared leader of the interrogation unit of the Santebal, gave testimony on 14 July 2009 and, although implicated in hands-on torture and execution along with Duch, he was not charged.

On 26 July 2010, the tribunal found Kang Kek Iew guilty of crimes against humanity, and grave breaches of the Geneva Conventions. Initially, Iew was sentenced to 35 years imprisonment. However, this was reduced owing to his illegal detention by the Cambodian Military Court between 1999 and 2007 and time already spent in the custody of the ECCC. The sentence was extended to life in prison on appeal.

=== Nuon Chea ===
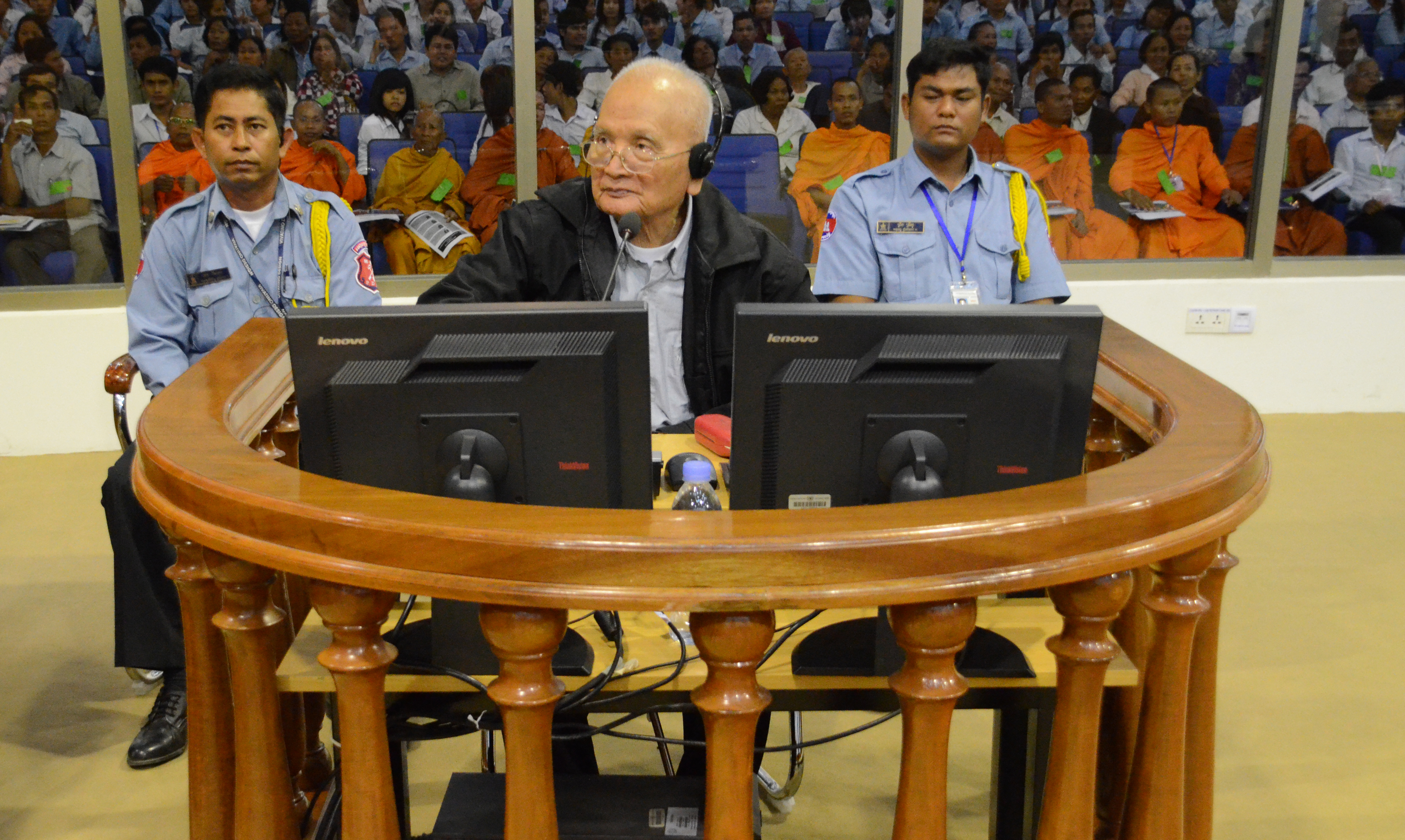
Nuon Chea before the tribunal on 5 December 2011

During the rule of the Khmer Rouge, Nuon Chea, party's chief ideologist, acted as the right-hand man of leader, Pol Pot. Allegations against Nuon Chea included crimes against humanity (murder, extermination, enslavement, deportation imprisonment, torture, persecution on political, racial, and religious grounds), genocide, and serious breaches of the Geneva Conventions of 1949 (willful killing, torture or inhumane treatment, willfully causing great suffering or serious injury to body or health, willfully depriving a prisoner of war or civilian the rights of fair and regular trial, unlawful deportation or unlawful confinement of a civilian).

Nuon Chea joined the Communist Party of Kampuchea (the Khmer Rouge's official name) while studying law at Thammasat University in Bangkok. In 1960, he was appointed Deputy Secretary to oversee the security of the party and the state. His charges included overseeing Phnom Penh's S-21 prison. It is estimated that Nuon Chea is responsible for the death of 1.7 million people during the rule of the Khmer Rouge.

In 1998, Nuon Chea reached an agreement with the Cambodian Government which allowed him to live near the Thai border. He was arrested and put into custody in 2007. His case, number 002, has been under investigation since 2007 and hearings began in 2011. Although Chea is the highest-ranking official to be detained he denies the majority of his involvement in the Khmer Rouge: "I was president of the National Assembly and had nothing to do with the operation of the government. Sometimes I didn't know what they were doing because I was in the assembly".

On 7 August 2014, in Case 002/1, the Trial Chamber found Nuon Chea guilty of numerous crimes against humanity and sentenced him to life imprisonment. On 23 November 2016, The Supreme Court Chamber, although reversing some of the convictions, upheld this sentence. On 16 November 2018, in the second case opened against him before the ECCC (Case 002/02), the Trial Chamber found him guilty of genocide against the Vietnamese people and the Cham people.

Nuon Chea died on 4 August 2019 while appealing his conviction for genocide against the Vietnamese people and the Cham people in Case 002/2. The Supreme Court Chamber terminated these remaining proceedings against him on 13 August 2019 but his defense lawyers filed a request before the Supreme Court Chamber arguing that, in absence of any appeal judgment, Nuon Chea should be considered innocent and that trial judgement issued on 16 November 2018 against him should be vacated. On 22 November 2019, the Supreme Court Chamber clarified notably that Nuon Chea's death did not vacate the trial judgment against him and that, although the presumption of innocence applies at the appeal stage, it does not equate to post mortem finding of not guilty.

=== Ieng Sary ===
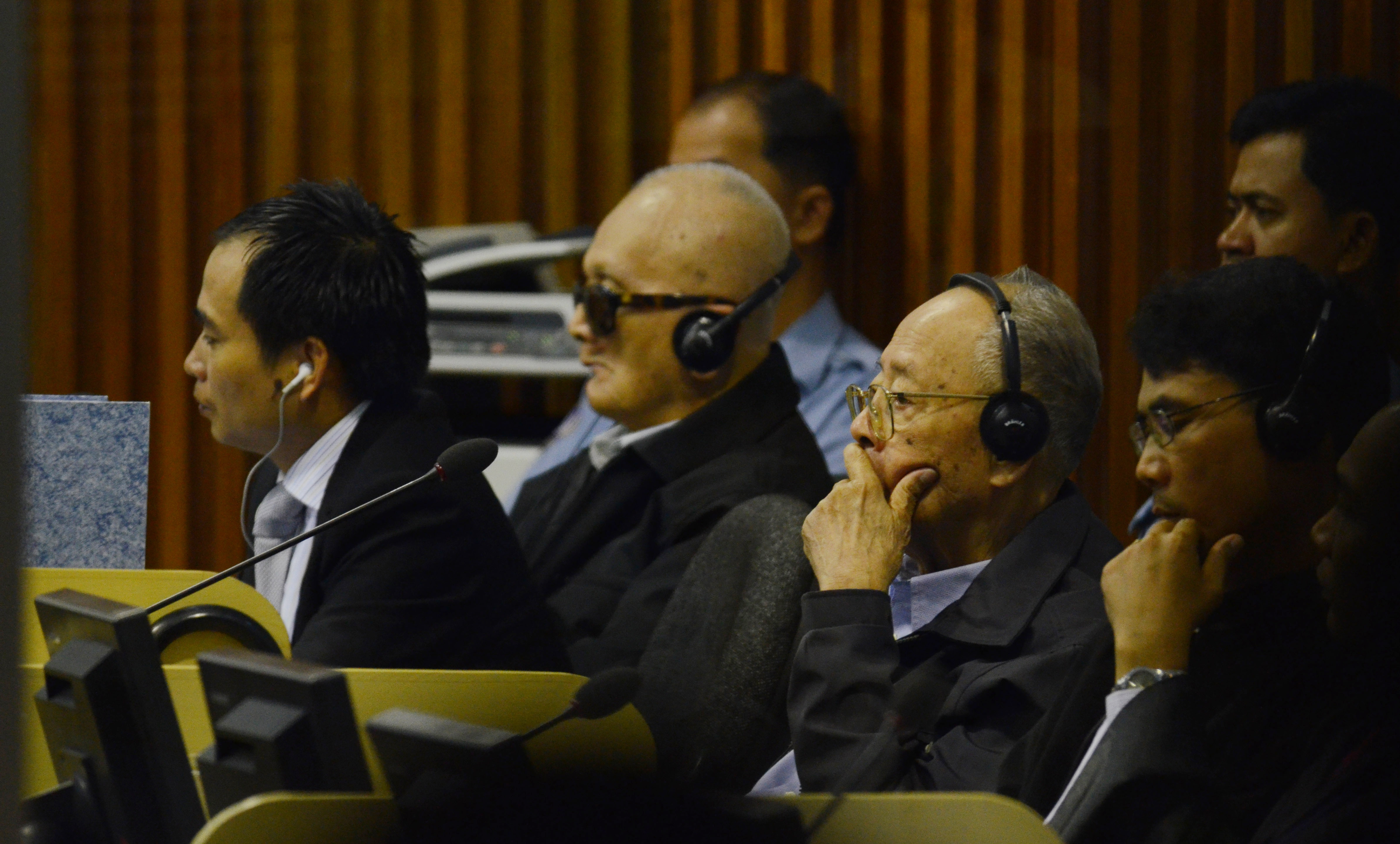
Nuon Chea and Ieng Sary during the third day of preliminary hearing on fitness to stand trial, 31 August 2011

Ieng Sary allegedly joined the Khmer Rouge in 1963. Before he studied in France where he joined the French Communist Party and upon his return to Cambodia, he joined CPK. When the Khmer Rouge took control in 1975, Ieng became the Deputy Prime Minister for Foreign Affairs. When the regime fell in 1979, Ieng fled to Thailand and was convicted of genocide and sentenced to death by the People's Revolutionary Tribunal of Phnom Penh. Ieng remained a member of the Khmer Rouge government in exile until 1996 when he was granted a royal pardon for his conviction and royal amnesty for this outlawing of the Khmer Rouge.

Ieng Sary was arrested on 12 November 2007. He is alleged responsible (through his acts or omissions) for planning, instigating, ordering, aiding/abetting, or overseeing of the crimes of the Khmer Rouge between 1975 and 1979. Allegations against Ieng Sary include crimes against humanity, genocide and breaches of the Geneva Convention.

Ieng Sary died in March 2013 while the case against him was still ongoing and no verdict had yet been handed over.

=== Ieng Thirith ===
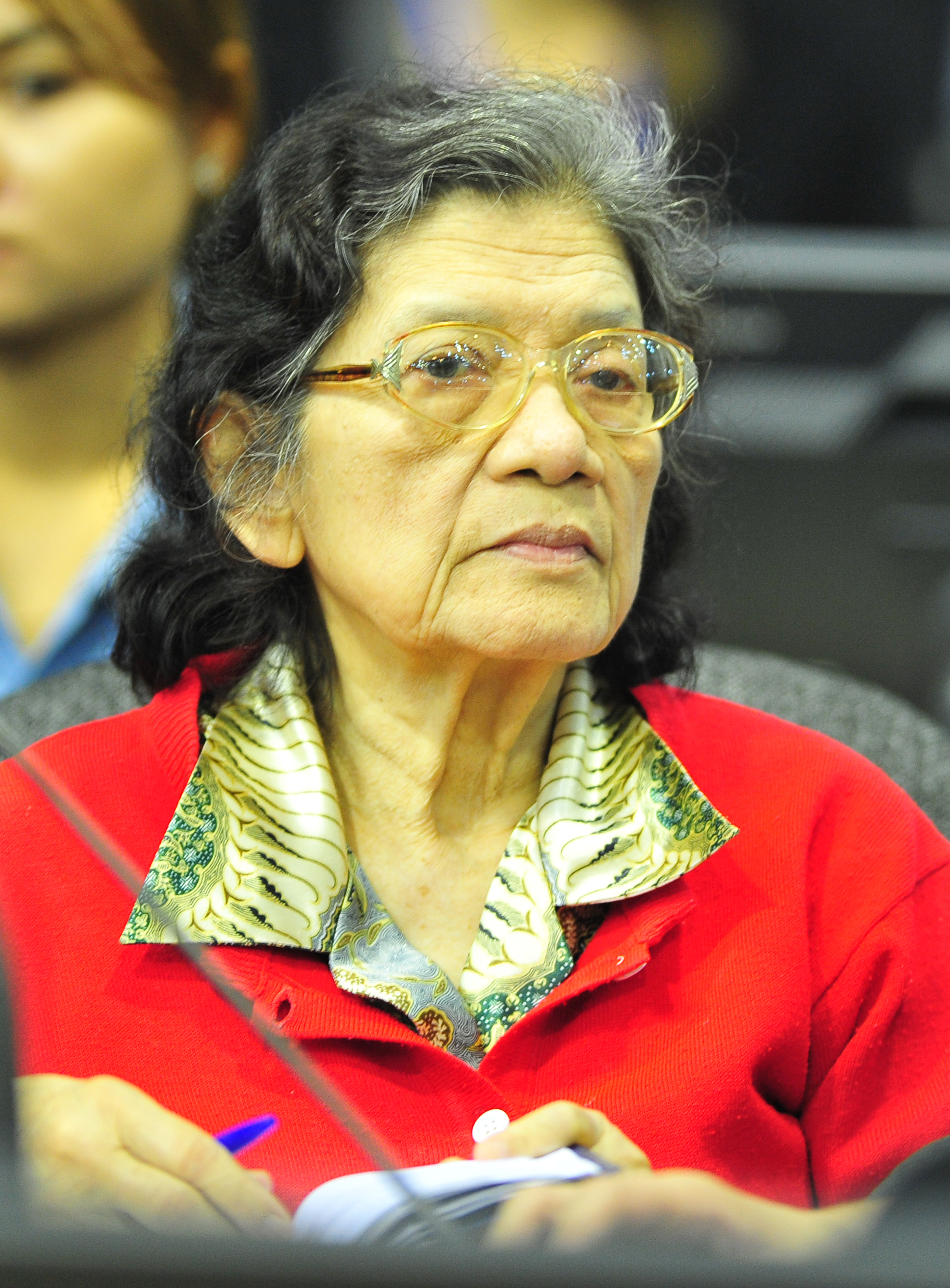
Ieng Thirith on trial in 2011

Ieng Thirith, wife of Ieng Sary and sister-in-law of Pol Pot, was a senior member of the Khmer Rouge. She studied in France and was the first Cambodian to receive a degree in English. Upon her return to Cambodia, she joined CPK and was allegedly appointed Minister of Social Affairs in Democratic Kampuchea.

Thirith remained with the Khmer Rouge until her husband, Ieng Sary, was pardoned by the Cambodian government in 1998. After, she and Sary lived together near Phnom Penh until both were arrested by Cambodian police and tribunal officials on 12 November 2007.

Thirith is allegedly responsible for the planning, instigating, and aiding/abetting the crimes of the Khmer Rouge against Cambodians during the time of Khmer Rouge control. Allegations against Thirith include crimes against humanity, genocide and breaches of the Geneva Convention. In November 2011, Ieng Thirith was found to be mentally unfit to stand trial, due to Alzheimer's disease.

Ieng Thirith died in August 2015.

=== Khieu Samphan ===
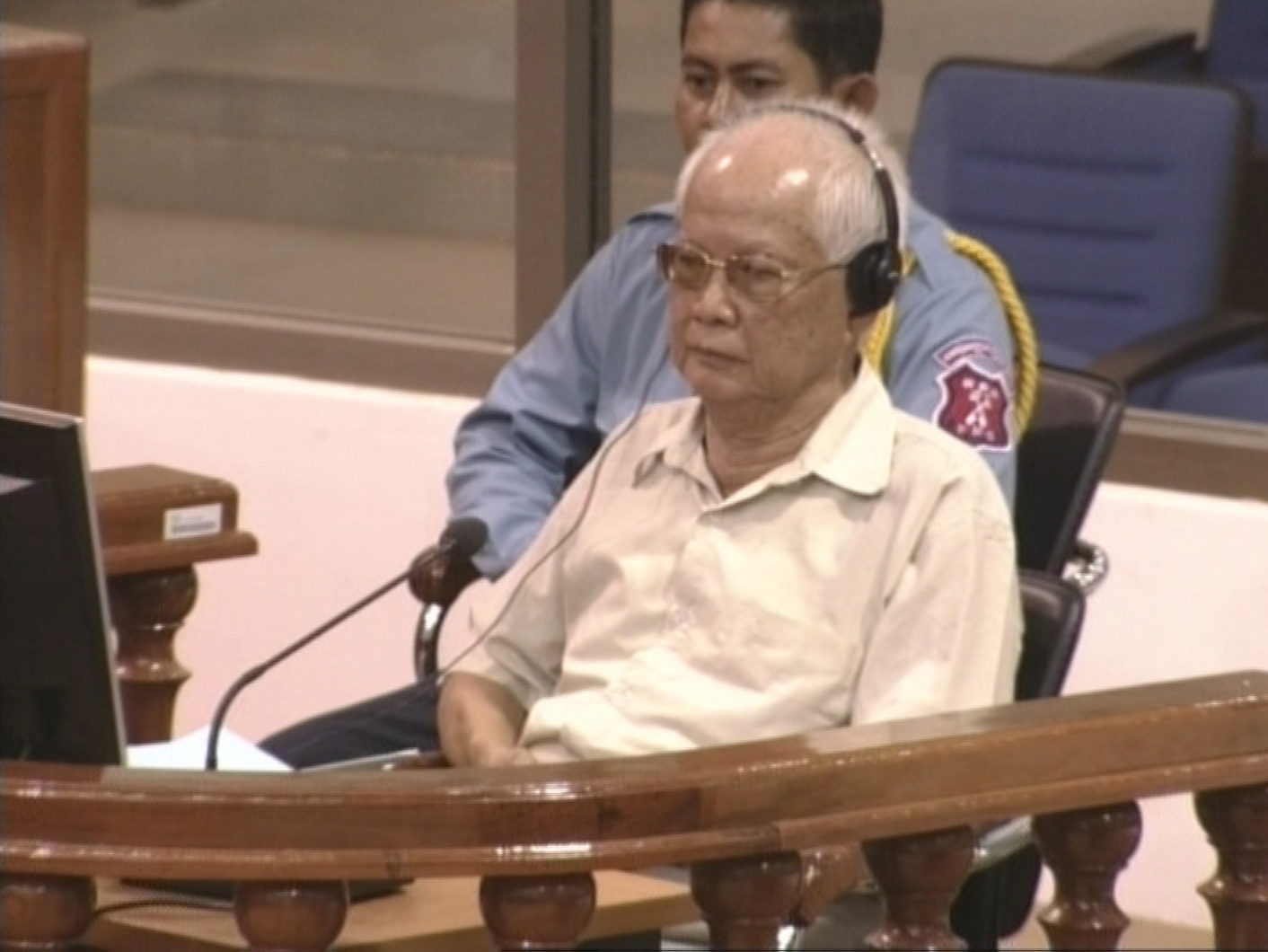
Khieu Samphan before the Cambodia Tribunal in July 2009

Khieu Samphan acted as one of the Khmer Rouge's most powerful officials. Before joining the Khmer Rouge, Khieu Samphan was Secretary of State for Trade for the Sihanouk regime in 1962. Under threat of Sihanouk's security forces, Samphan went into hiding in 1969 and emerged as a member of the Khmer Rouge in the early 1970s. He was appointed Democratic Kampuchea's Head of State and succeeded Pol Pot as leader of the Khmer Rouge in 1987.

Khieu Samphan pledged allegiance to the Cambodian government in 1998 and left the Khmer Rouge. He was arrested on 12 November 2007 on the allegations of the commission of crimes against humanity, genocide and violations of the Geneva Conventions.

On August 7, 2014, he was found guilty of crimes against humanity and sentenced to life imprisonment, in Case 002/1. The sentence was upheld on appeal. In the second case against him, the Trial Chamber found him guilty of the crime of genocide against the Vietnamese people on 16 November 2018. His appeal against this conviction for genocide was rejected on 22 September 2022, with the guilty verdicts of genocide, crimes against humanity, and grave breaches of the Geneva Convention confirmed.

=== Ao An ===
AO An served as the Central Zone Deputy Secretary and the Sector 41 Secretary during the Khmer Rouge regime.

=== Meas Muth, alias Achar Nen – Case 003 ===
The investigation in Case 003 focuses on the crimes committed by Meas Muth, high-ranking member of the Revolutionary Army of Kampuchea (RAK) during the period from 17 April 1975 to 6 January 1979. Meas Muth was the Commander of Division 164, the largest division of the RAK that included the command of entire Navy, was a reserve member of the General Staff Committee and was the Secretary of the Kampong Som Autonomous Sector (which reported directly to the Party Center). Center for Justice & Accountability represents 76 Civil Party applicants to the Case 003 proceedings. It was headquartered in the Kampong Saom area, with bases in several ports along the sea coast and on islands in the Gulf of Siam. Meas Muth had command of 10 000 forces. As Navy Commander, Meas Muth also delivered prisoners to the execution sites, including the infamous S-21 prison.

Meas Muth is also blamed for the deaths of 11 Westerners who were seized after their boats strayed into Cambodian waters. They were arrested and sent to S-21 where they perished.

On 18 November 2018, the Co-Investigating Judges issues their Closing Orders. The National Co-Investigating Judge issued an order dismissing all the charges against Meas Muth on the ground that he is not one of the most responsible for the crimes committed during the Khmer Rouge regime. Conversely, the International Co-Investigating Judge found Meas Muth to be one of the most responsible for war crimes and genocide and indicted him under the charges of genocide of the Thai and Vietnamese, crimes against humanity, war crimes and homicide under the 1956 Cambodian Penal Code. As Navy commander Meas Muth had sufficient authority and culpability to be considered “most responsible".

On 7 April 2021, the Pre-Trial Chamber issued its Considerations on the Appeals against the Closing Orders. Firstly, the Chamber unanimously reiterated its findings that the issuance of two conflicting closing orders is illegal. Secondly, the National Judges found that both the Indictment and the Dismissal Order were valid and stood while the International Judges concluded that only the indictment was valid. Therefore, unlike in Case 004/2, all five of the Pre-Trial Chamber's Judges de facto reached the required supermajority on the validity of the indictment. The reinstated Office of the Co-Investigating Judges denied a request to transfer the Case File 003 to the Trial Chamber. The Defense and the Prosecutor filed requests before the Pre-Trial Chamber respectively asking to terminate the Case and to transfer the Case File to the Trial Chamber. The Pre-Trial Chamber unanimously responded that "having fulfilled all its duties in accordance with the ECCC’s legal framework, including the Cambodian Code of Criminal Procedure, intends to stand by its Considerations. It categorically refuses to be associated, through the actions of confused Co-Investigating Judges or requests that have already been granted, with malpractices that have provoked such failure that it now seems insurmountable to those who have caused it." The Chamber also "questions the reasoning of an Investigating Judge who after having ordered the trial of an accused person for genocide crimes against humanity war crimes and other crimes under Cambodian law and after ten years of investigation now declares himself, on imaginary legal grounds, unable to forward the case to the Trial Chamber and potentially ready to archive it." The Prosecutor seised the Supreme Court Chamber of the Case.

=== Yim Tith – Case 004 ===
When the Khmer Rouge took control of Phnom Penh on April 17, 1975, Yim Tith was appointed as the party secretary for Kirivong district (in Sector 13). During the regime's power, Yim Tith rose to the position of Sector 13 secretary (until June 1978) and later became secretary of the North West Zone Sectors 1, 3 and 4. He is believed to responsible for crimes committed by Khmer Rouge cadres in Takeo Province from 1975 to 1978, in Pursat Province in 1978 to 1979 and later in Battambang Province in 1978 to 1979. He targeted Khmer Krom and Vietnamese communities for total elimination.

On 28 June 2019, the Co-Investigating Judges issues their Closing Orders. The National Co-Investigating issued an order dismissing all the charges against YIM Tith on the ground that he is not one of the most responsible for the crimes committed during the Khmer Rouge regime. Conversely, the International Co-Investigating Judge found YIM Tith to be one of the most responsible notably for the genocide of the Khmer Krom, crimes against humanity, war crimes as well as domestic offences under Cambodian law.

On 17 September 2021, the Pre-Trial Chamber issued its Considerations on the Five Appeals against the Closing Orders. Firstly, the Chamber unanimously reiterated its findings that the issuance of two conflicting closing orders is illegal. Secondly, the National Judges found that the ECCC had no jurisdiction of the YIM Tith and that the Case should be terminated and archived while the International Judges found that only the Indictment stood valid and concluded their opinion saying that "at this stage, there is no doubt that the indictments are valid. There is no doubt that the principle of continuation of the investigation and prosecution applies to Case 004, as it applied to Case 003 before it. There is no doubt that the criminal facts brought to light in Case 004 and, prior to that in Cases 004/1 and 003, call for urgent consideration of the serious charges brought against the accused persons."

== Controversy surrounding Cases 003 and 004 ==
Former Khmer Rouge navy commander Meas Muth remains free despite the issuance of 2 outstanding arrest warrants. These arrest warrants have not been acted upon by police officials and Muth continues to live in relative peace in Battambang province, while his Case 003, as it is known, continues to be opposed by Prime Minister Hun Sen. The three Cambodian judges on the panel have defended their opposition by stating that an arrest "in Cambodian society, is regarded as humiliating and affecting Meas Muth's honour, dignity and rights substantially and irremediably." Muth is charged with homicide and crimes against humanity, allegedly committed in a number of different locations around the country and its islands.

ECCC's prosecution was suggested to drop case 004 in return to get Cambodian judges to agree to proceed with Case 003 as Meas Muth was directly responsible for Khmer Rouge Navy and some districts. Conviction of Meas Muth would represent significant portion of Khmer Rouge misplaced regime as a whole. The Cambodian Prime Minister and dictator Hun Sen who has been in power since 1985, himself a former Khmer Rouge soldier, does not want himself or his subordinates involved in additional trials, as more truth would come to light on lower level Khmer Rouge cadres who are now serving in the government.

=== Resignation of judges ===
In June 2011, the court experienced significant public controversy following the release of a public statement by International Co-Prosecutor Andrew Cayley criticising the Co-Investigating Judges for closing their investigation of Case 003 prematurely, including an accusation that the judges were attempting to "bury" the case. The defendants charged in Case 003 are Meas Muth and Sou Met, two Khmer Rouge army commanders who allegedly oversaw the arrests and transportation of prisoners to the S-21 prison. This statement followed international concerns that the court might succumb to government pressures not to indict additional defendants. German Co-Investigating Judge Siegfried Blunk criticised Cayley's statement as a violation of the court's internal confidentiality rules.

After Siegfried Blunk resigned from his job unexpectedly in March 2012 over the government's statements opposing further prosecutions, it was said that while he was not influenced by political statements, "his ability to withstand such pressure by government officials to perform his duties independently, could always be called in doubt, and this would also call in doubt the integrity of the whole proceedings" of Cases 003 and 004. Judge Blunk had been a controversial figure since he assumed the seat of French judge Marcel Lemonde who resigned in 2010, to investigate cases 003 and 004.

After international co-investigating Judge Laurent Kasper-Ansermet (Swiss) left his job unexpectedly, it cast more doubt on the court's ability to pursue more cases such as Case 003 and 004 against the ailing Khmer Rouge leaders.

Similar allegations of political pressure have been alleged in case 004. Case 004 involves former mid-level Khmer Rouge commanders Im Chaem, Ta Ann and Ta Tith. Chaem ran a forced labor camp involving a massive irrigation project in Preah Net Preah and Ta Ann and Ta Tith were two deputies who oversaw massacres in the camp. Since then, Ta Tith has become a wealthy businessman in Cambodia and Im Chaem has become a commune chief in Cambodia's Anlong Veng District, further speculating political pressure would come to drop charges if these three were ever tried together.

As early as November 2010, the Defence Support Section attempted to assign lawyers to represent the interests of the suspects in Cases 003 and 004.

=== Failure of the government to prosecute genocide ===
Pre-Trial Chamber's Case 004 Considerations issued on 17 September 2021, Judges Kang Jin BAIK and Olivier BEAUVALLET underlined the continued absence of genuine prosecutorial effort by the Cambodian authorities and recalled that, as a state party to the Genocide Convention, the Royal Government of Cambodia has an obligation to ensure that Khmer Rouge cadres charged with genocide are prosecuted and tried by a competent court of justice. They added that considering the evidence collected in Cases 003 and 004, the national authorities are "indubitably obligated to take on the responsibility to prosecute the Defendants should the ECCC not proceed further".

== Domestic response ==
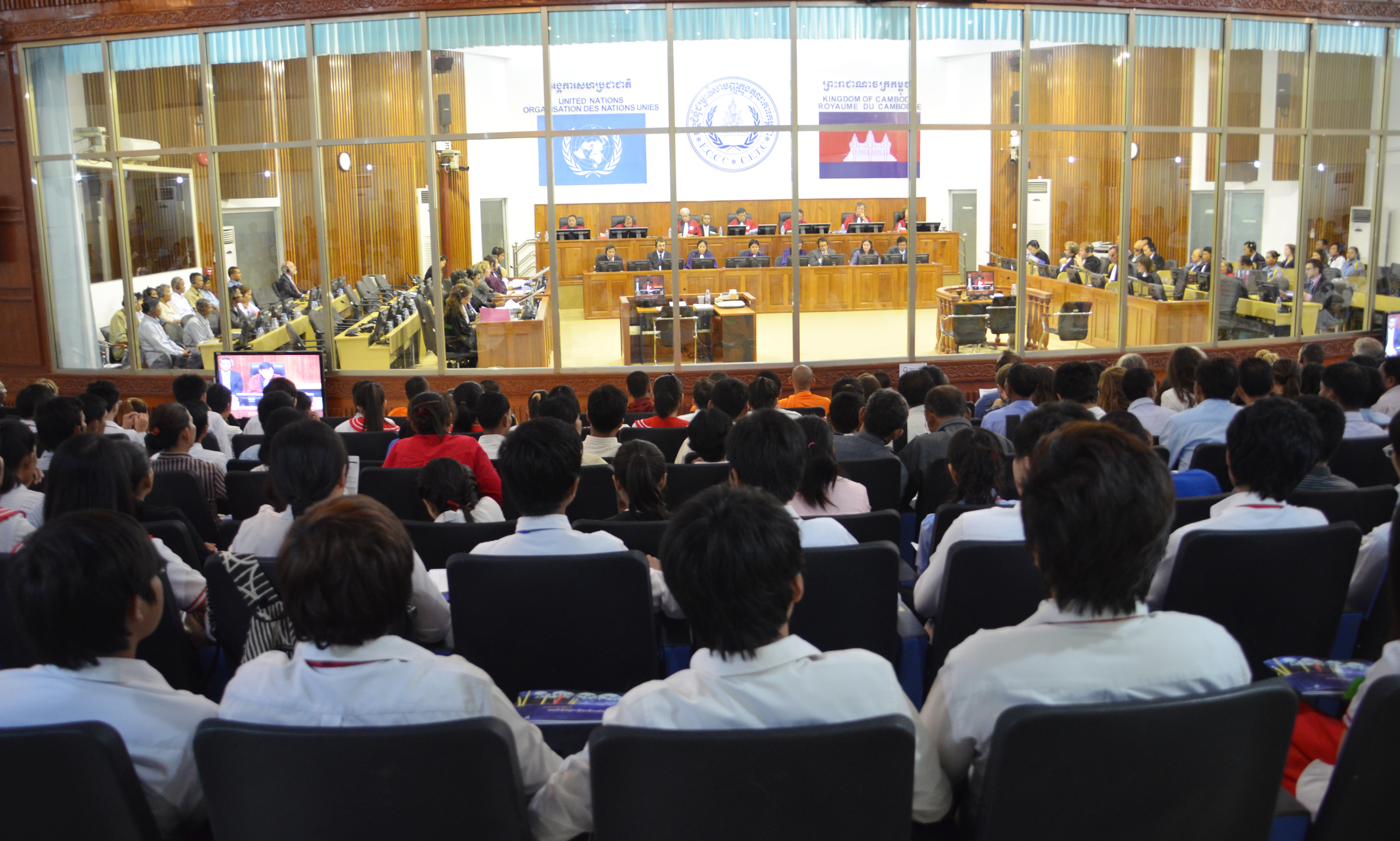
All 482 seats in the public gallery are occupied, 29 August 2013

The ECCC received broad public support. Under the early leadership of the ECCC's Helen Jarvis and the UN's Peter Wickwire Foster, the public affairs office of the ECCC fully integrated Cambodian and United Nations staff from the very start, helping to present a unified message to the public and launch effective public information and outreach programs. This integration was unique within the ECCC's early structure, which had initially divided international and national staff working areas. Nevertheless, the courts overall administrative and judicial divisions led to some mixed messages and public confusion.

As a result of the extensive outreach initiatives, more than 353,000 people observed or participated in the court's proceedings. In Case 001, 36,493 people observed the trial and appeal hearings. In Case 002, the first trial involving multiple Khmer Rouge leaders, 98,670 people attended the 212-day trial hearings. In addition, nearly 67,000 people from rural areas in Cambodia attended ECCC community video screenings. The ECCC also took steps to involve younger members of the community by educating them on the court proceedings. According to a survey conducted by the International Republican Institute, 67% of the respondents replied that they "very much agree" with a trial against the top Khmer Rouge leaders. In a more recent population survey conducted by University of California, Berkeley, 83% of the respondents agreed that the ECCC should be involved in responding to what happened during the Khmer Rouge regime. The same survey also concluded that the awareness of the ECCC had substantially increased from 2008 to 2010.

== Criticisms ==
There were many criticisms involving the ECCC. For instance there was significant controversy surrounding the closings of Case 003 and Case 004. Many international critics say these closings stem from a reluctance by the Cambodian government to try Khmer Rouge officials who managed to switch alliances towards the end of the conflict.

Furthermore, the ECCC was criticized for its general stagnancy in relation to its finances. In financing the tribunal, the Cambodian government and the United Nations were both responsible for managing the cost of operations of the ECCC. Between 2006 and 2012, $173.3 million was spent on the ECCC. Out of the $173.3 million, Cambodia has contributed $42.1 million, while the United Nations has donated the other $131.2 million. For the year 2013, Cambodia had a budget of $9.4 million to spend, while the United Nations had $26 million, making the total budget for that year $35.4 million. However, as of 2014, the ECCC had cost over $200,000,000, in which, at that point, only one case has been completed. Many in the international committee demanded an outside committee to review the failures of the ECCC. In accordance, many urged countries such as Japan, Germany, France, the United States, and the United Kingdom to stop financing the ECCC until it became a more transparent and independent court.

The court was also criticized for its rejections of victim applications. A victim applying to participate in Case 003 was rejected because the judges claimed her psychological harm to be "highly unlikely to be true" and through a narrow definition of "direct victim", determined her an indirect victim in the case. The Open Society Justice Initiative called for the UN to investigate the proceedings of the ECCC. A trial monitor for the OSJI claimed that the recent proceedings "don't meet basic requirements or adhere to international standards or even comply with the court's own prior jurisprudence." In late February 2012, the court requested another $92 million to cover its operating cost for 2012 and 2013.

== See also ==
- Bibliography of the Cambodian genocide
- Mass killings under Communist regimes
- People's Revolutionary Tribunal (Cambodia) – The 1979 trial, in-absentia, of Pol Pot and Ieng Sary by the People's Republic of Kampuchea
