= People's Revolutionary Tribunal (Cambodia) =

Established by the People's Republic of Kampuchea

The People's Revolutionary Tribunal (Khmer: តុលាការប្រជាជនបដិវត្តន៍) was a tribunal established by the People's Republic of Kampuchea in 1979 to try the Khmer Rouge leaders Pol Pot and Ieng Sary in absentia for genocide.

== Trial and verdict ==
The tribunal began seven months after the overthrow of Khmer Rouge's Democratic Kampuchea and was staffed by both Cambodian and international lawyers. The tribunal was held at Phnom Penh's Chaktomuk Theatre and transcripts of the proceedings were made available in Khmer, French and English. The court heard testimony from 39 witnesses over five days. The verdict, handed down on August 19, 1979, found Pol Pot and Ieng Sary guilty of genocide, sentenced them to death and ordered the confiscation of their property.

== Defense ==
- Dith Munty
- Hope Stevens

== Perceptions of the trial ==
At that time many Western countries led by the United States dismissed the People's Republic of Kampuchea as a puppet of Vietnam and the tribunal as a show trial.

== After the trial ==
Ieng Sary was granted a royal pardon by King Norodom Sihanouk in 1996 in exchange for his defection to the government. Pol Pot died in 1998 shortly after he was placed in house arrest by his deputy Ta Mok.

== See also ==
- Bibliography of the Cambodian genocide
- Extraordinary Chambers in the Courts of Cambodia
