= Ney Thol =

Cambodian judge

Ney Thol is a Cambodian judge and member of the Khmer Rouge Tribunal. Thol was director of the School for Military Officers before being appointed president of the Military Court of Cambodia since 1987.
