= Baik Kang Jin =

South Korean judge

Baik Kang Jin (Korean: 백강진) is a South Korean judge and member of the Khmer Rouge Tribunal. He was formerly a judge at the Seoul High Court and a special commissioner of the Presidential Council on Intellectual Property.
