= Hope Stevens =

American lawyer

Hope R. Stevens
- Born: 4 February 1905; Tortola, British Virgin Islands
- Died: 24 June 1982 (aged 77); Queens, New York
- Known for: Lawyer, Political activist, businessman

Hope R. Stevens (February 4, 1905 – June 24, 1982) was a lawyer, political and civic activist, and businessman.

== Early life and education ==
Born in Tortola in the British Virgin Islands and raised on Nevis, he was one of the founders of the Barbados Labour Party. Stevens moved to the United States in 1924 and graduated from City College of New York in 1933 and Brooklyn Law School in 1936. He was admitted to the New York bar in 1937. He was later based in Harlem, New York, and became the president of the Uptown Chamber of Commerce from 1960 to 1977.

== Career ==
He served as "Co-chairperson of the National Conference of Black Lawyers. He appeared as the defense counsel during the trial in absentia of Pol Pot and Ieng Sary at the People's Revolutionary Tribunal held by the Vietnamese-backed People's Republic of Kampuchea in Phnom Penh in 1979. Stevens belonged to the New York branch of the Association of Democratic Lawyers.

He was awarded Order of the British Empire because of his public service to a number of the governments.

Stevens died of a heart attack on June 24, 1982, at Booth Memorial Hospital in Queens at the age of 77.
