= Robert Petit =

Canadian lawyer

Robert Petit is a Canadian lawyer who during 2006 and 2009 was the International Co-Prosecutor for the Extraordinary Chambers in the Courts of Cambodia, which is aiming to try Khmer Rouge leaders for violations of international criminal law in Cambodia between 1975 and 1979. He led the investigation and prosecution of five senior most leaders of the Khmer Rouge namely Nuon Chea, Ieng Sary, Ieng Thirith, Khieu Samphan, and Kang Kek Iew. The last was recently convicted for war crimes and crimes against humanity. Petit also initiated the prosecution of five other Khmer Rouge leaders whose cases are still under investigation by the United Nations-backed tribunal.

Petit was a Crown prosecutor in Montreal for eight years. From 1996 to 1999, he was a Legal Officer in the Office of the Prosecutor of the International Criminal Tribunal for Rwanda. Between 1999 and 2004, he was a Regional Legal Advisor for the United Nations Interim Administration Mission in Kosovo, a Prosecutor for the Serious Crimes Unit of the United Nations Mission of Support to East Timor, and a Senior Trial Attorney for the Special Court for Sierra Leone.

At the Rwanda Tribunal, Petit drafted indictments in the Government, Butare, Hategekimana, and Nizeyimana cases. At the Special Court for Sierra Leone, he led the task force that prosecuted six indictees in two separate cases for crimes against humanity, including terrorism and war crimes. In UNMIK, Petit provided legal advice to the International Administrator of one of five Regions of Kosovo on various issues including the implementation of an international judiciary and issues arising out of the deployment of international police and armed forces. In UNMIT, he exercised criminal investigative functions and led the prosecutions of persons suspected of mass crimes committed during a period of national political transition in East Timor.

Petit served as a Counsel in the Crimes Against Humanity and the War Crimes Section of Justice Canada. He was responsible for working with the Royal Canadian Mounted Police, who lead investigations as well as the Public Prosecutions Service of Canada who prosecute mass atrocity cases in Canadian courts with special focus on Africa.

As of March 22nd 2024, Petit holds the position of Head of the International, Impartial and Independent Mechanism to Assist in the Investigation and Prosecution of Persons Responsible for the Most Serious Crimes under International Law Committed in the Syrian Arab Republic since March 2011.

Petit was called to the Quebec Bar in 1987 and has spoken and written extensively on international humanitarian and human rights laws. In 2009, he received the Frederick K. Cox International Humanitarian Award for Global reform at the Case Western School of Law, Cleveland.

He speaks fluent English and French.

Petit was selected in 2011 as one of the four final candidates to succeed Luis Moreno-Ocampo as the Prosecutor of the International Criminal Court in the Hague.

== Related external links ==
- Cambodia Tribunal Monitor
