= Sin Rith =

Cambodian judge

Sin Rith is a Cambodian judge and reserve member of the Khmer Rouge Tribunal. He was appointed lead prosecutor of the Supreme Court of Cambodia in 2005. He has a PhD in law from Kazakhstan National University.
