= Marie-Catherine Huot =

Marie-Catherine Huot (30 April 1791 – 7 January 1869), known as Sainte-Madeleine in her vocation, succeeded Marie-Victoire Baudry as superior of the Congregation of Notre Dame with its motherhouse in Montreal, Quebec, Canada.
