= Cheang Tong Commune =

Cheang Tong ឃុំជាងទង
- Commune (Khum)
- Location within Cambodia
- Coordinates: 11°03′33″N 104°36′53″E
- Country: Cambodia
- Province: Takéo
- District: Tram Kak
- Time zone: UTC+7
- Geocode: 210902

Cheang Tong Commune (Khmer: ឃុំជាងទង) is a khum (commune) in Tram Kak District, Takéo Province, Cambodia.

== Administration ==
As of 2019, Cheang Tong Commune has 16 phums (villages) as follows.

No.	Code	Village	Khmer
1	21090201	Srae Khvav	ស្រែខ្វាវ
2	21090202	Ta Reab	តារាប
3	21090203	Angk Kralanh	អង្គក្រឡាញ់
4	21090204	Angk Baksei	អង្គបក្សី
5	21090205	Tuol Roka	ទួលរកា
6	21090206	Trapeang Srangae	ត្រពាំងស្រង៉ែ
7	21090207	Totueng Thngai	ទទឹងថ្ងៃ
8	21090208	Trapeang Tuek	ត្រពាំងទឹក
9	21090209	Ta Toem	តាតឹម
10	21090210	Moeang Char	មឿងចារ
11	21090211	Trapeang Pou	ត្រពាំងពោធិ៍
12	21090212	Sandao	សណ្ដោ
13	21090213	Ti Pat	ទីប៉ាត់
14	21090214	Srae Kruo	ស្រែគ្រួ
15	21090215	Tuol Tbaeng	ទួលត្បែង
16	21090216	Nomou	នមោ
