= Isabelle Huot =

Doctorate in nutrition

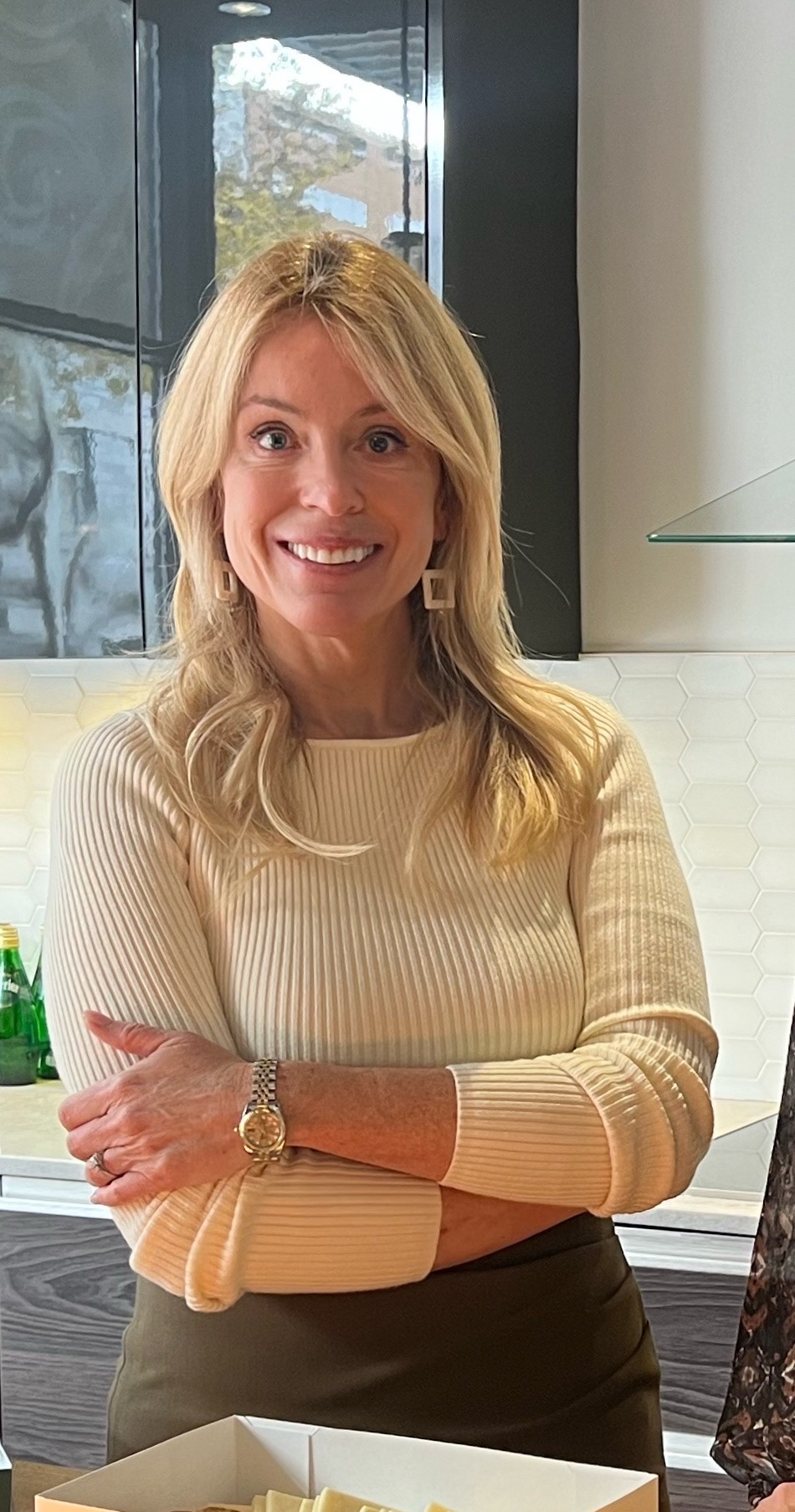
Huot in 2022

Isabelle Huot holds a doctorate in nutrition from Université de Montréal. Huot as a Nutritionist has participated in several research projects both in Canada and abroad. She carried out a year of research in nutritional epidemiology at the Geneva University Hospitals (French: Hôpitaux universitaires de Genève, HUG) in 1995. After obtaining a master's degree in epidemiology and nutrition from Université de Montréal, she continued her doctoral studies in nutrition during which she won a scholarship from the Danone for its study in "Impact of a community intervention to promote cardiovascular health on fat consumption". She completed her doctorate in 2003.

She writes in several media. In 2001, for a special feature published in L'Actualité Médicale, she was nominated for the Kenneth R. Wilson Memorial Award.

In 2009, she founded her own nutrition clinic Kilo Solution in Verdun. She now owns 3 clinics located in Verdun, downtown Montreal and Laval.

Isabelle is one of the six personalities featured in the Palmarès des Carrière of 2007. She is one of the 1000 exceptional women from the PORTRAITS X 1000 SERIES by photographer Pierre Maraval. She is a member of the Canadian Association for the Gastronomic and Hotel Press (Association canadienne de santé publiqu) and of the Union des Artistes. In addition, Isabelle is the spokesperson for mangezquebec.com. In 2011, she was named Verdun Business Personality of the Month for May.

In March 2020, Isabelle resigned from the Ordre des diététistes-nutritionnistes du Québec (ODNQ). Consequently, she cannot use the title or be presented as a dietitian or nutritionist.
