= Huot Vuthy =

Cambodian Judge and General Prosecutor

Huot Vuthy is a Cambodian judge and member of the Khmer Rouge Tribunal. He is a professor of law at Norton University.
