= Kong Srim =

Cambodian judge

Kong Srim is a Cambodian judge and the president of the Khmer Rouge Tribunal.

His past positions include:

- Deputy President of the Supreme Court of the Kingdom of Cambodia
- Deputy General Prosecutor of the Office of the General Prosecutor attached to the Court of Appeal
- Deputy Chief of the Prosecution Office, Department of Criminal and Civil Affairs of the Ministry of Justice
- Officer of the Ministry of Justice.
