= Cambodian art =

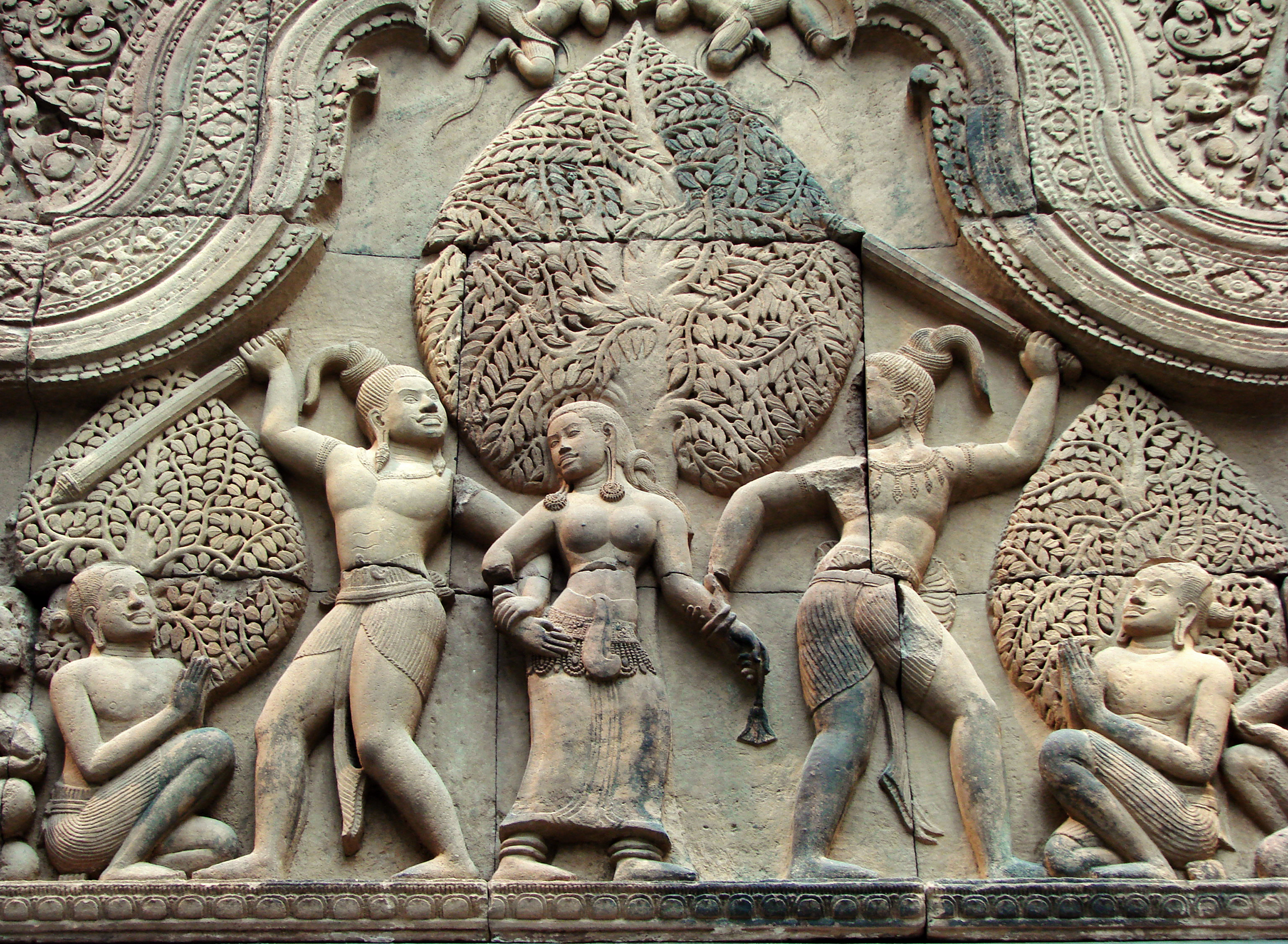
A stone carving of goddess Tilottama at Banteay Srei, an Angkorian temple consecrated in 967 CE.

The history of Cambodian art (Khmer: សិល្បៈខ្មែរ) stretches back centuries to ancient times, with the most widely recognized period being the art of the Khmer Empire (802–1431), especially in the area around Angkor and the 12th-century temple-complex of Angkor Wat, initially Hindu and subsequently Buddhist. After the collapse of the empire, these and other sites were abandoned and overgrown, allowing much of the era's stone carving and architecture to survive to the present day. Traditional Cambodian arts and crafts include textiles, non-textile weaving, silversmithing, stone carving, lacquerware, ceramics, wat murals, and kite-making.

Beginning in the mid-20th century, a tradition of modern art began in Cambodia, though in the later 20th century both traditional and modern arts declined for several reasons, including the killing of artists by the Khmer Rouge. The country has experienced a recent artistic revival due to increased support from governments, NGOs, and foreign tourists.

In pre-colonial Cambodia, art and crafts were generally produced either by rural non-specialists for practical use or by skilled artists producing works for the Royal Palace. In modern Cambodia, many artistic traditions entered a period of decline or even ceased to be practiced, but the country has experienced a recent artistic revival as the tourist market has increased and governments and NGOs have contributed to the preservation of Cambodian culture.

== Sculpture ==
=== Stone carving ===
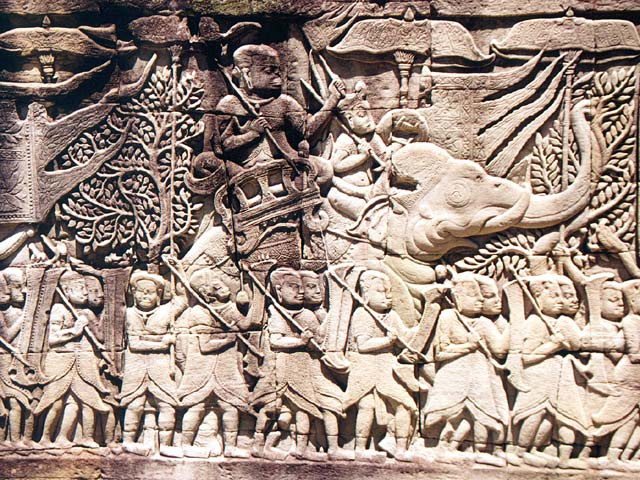
A stone bas-relief at Bayon temple depicting the Khmer army at war with the Cham, carved c. 1200 CE

Cambodia's best-known stone carving adorns the temples of Angkor, which are "renowned for the scale, richness and detail of their sculpture". In modern times, however, the art of stone carving became rare, largely because older sculptures survived undamaged for centuries (eliminating the need for replacements) and because of the use of cement molds for modern temple architecture. By the 1970s and 1980s, the craft of stone carving was nearly lost.

During the late 20th century, however, efforts to restore Angkor resulted in a new demand for skilled stone carvers to replace missing or damaged pieces, and a new tradition of stone carving is arising to meet this need. Most modern carving is traditional-style, but some carvers are experimenting with contemporary designs. Interest is also renewing for using stone carving in modern wats. Modern carvings are typically made from Banteay Meanchey sandstone, though stone from Pursat and Kompong Thom is also used.

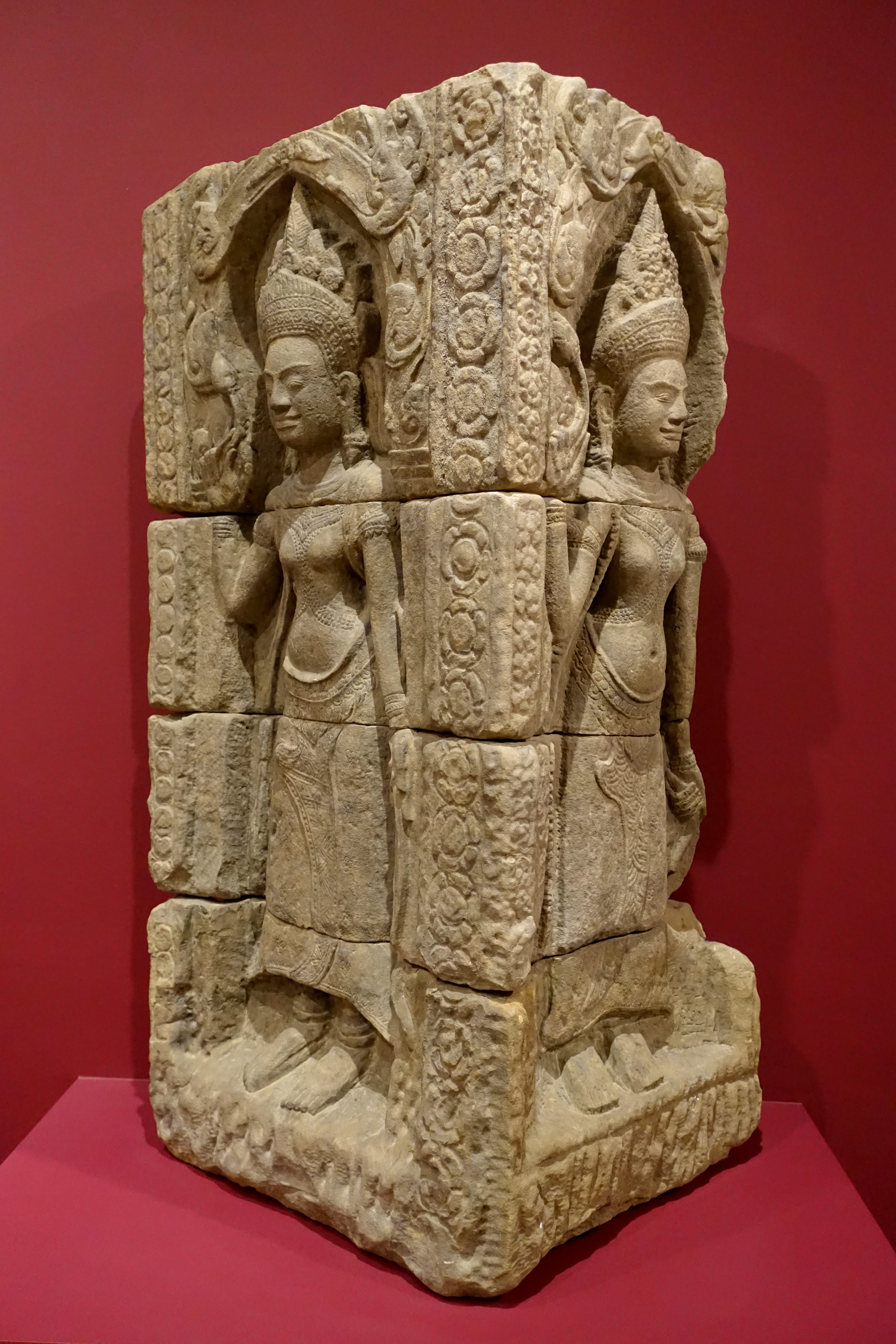
A corner relief with devatas; late 1100s to early 1200s AD (Bayon period); sandstone; Dallas Museum of Art (Texas, USA)

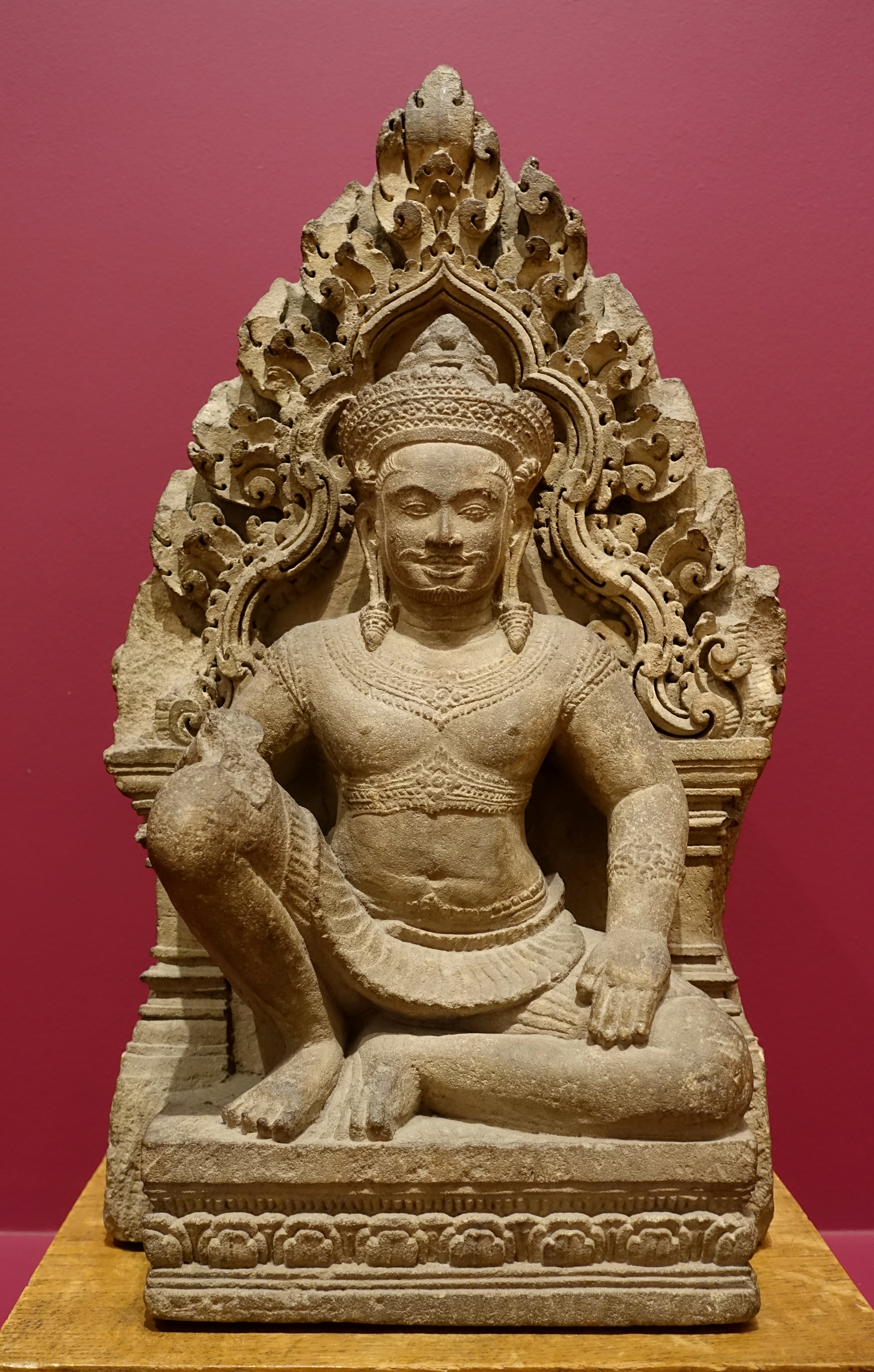
A seated figure in a niche; 950-975 AD; made in the Bantey Srei style; Dallas Museum of Art

=== Metal sculpture ===
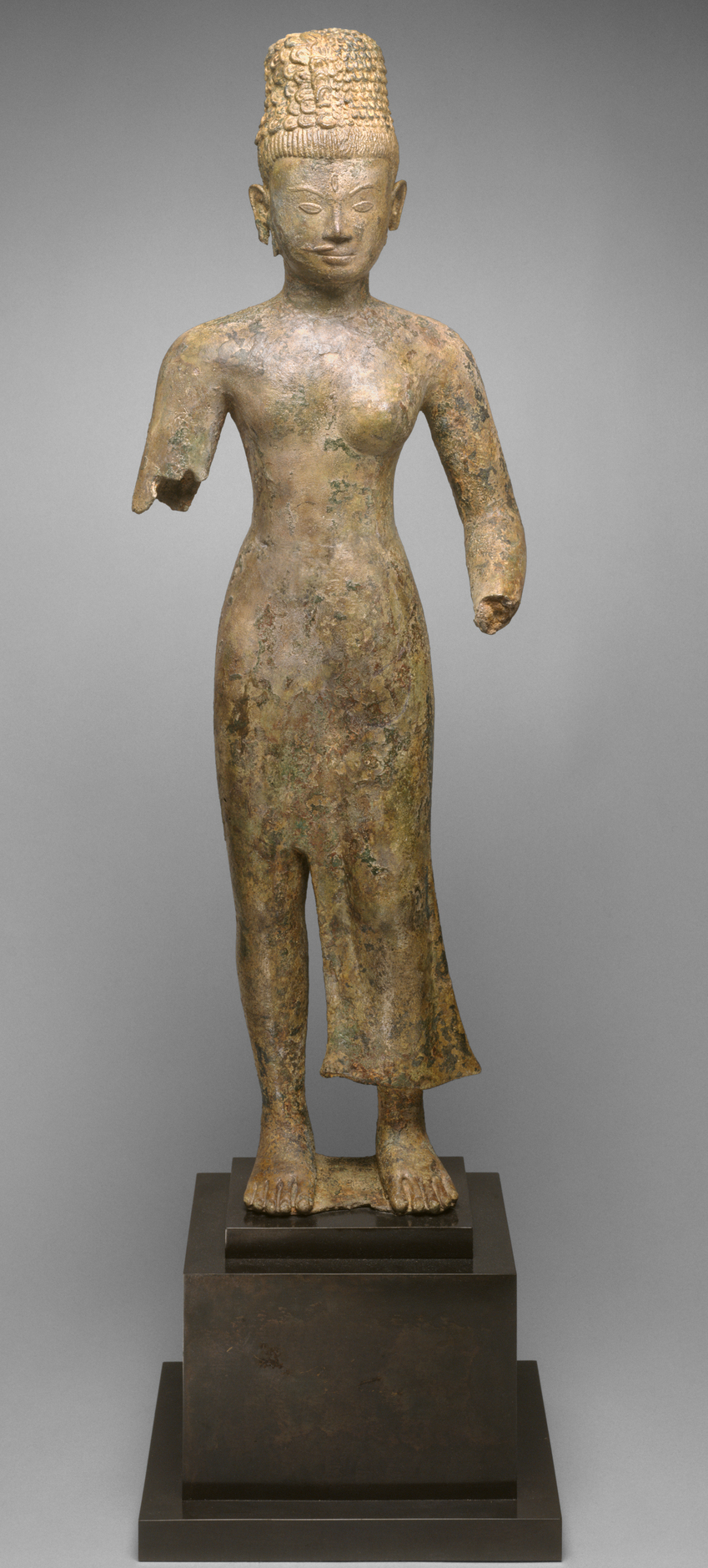
600s-700s AD bronze Khmer Ardhanarishvara (composite of Shiva and Parvati)

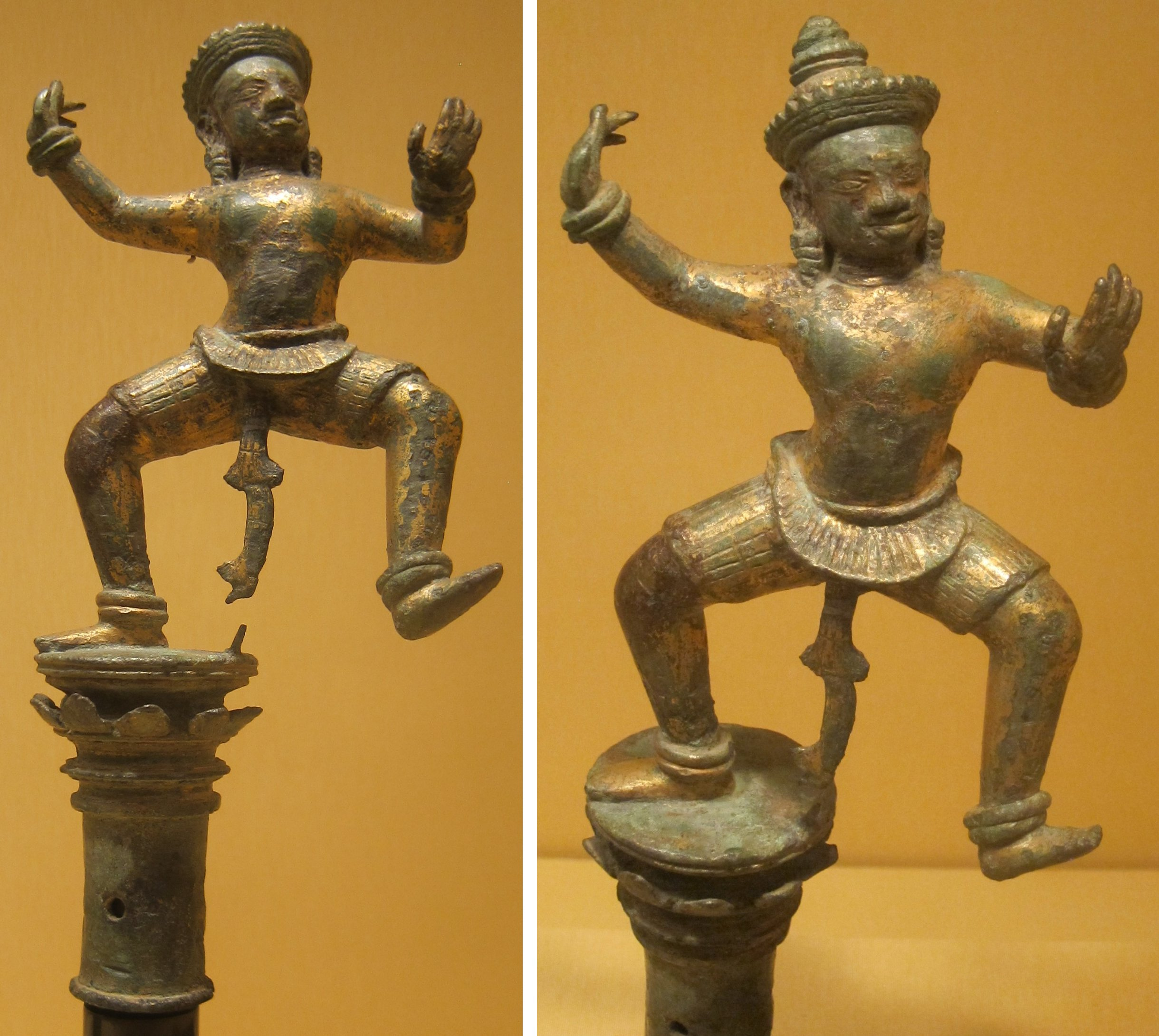
900s AD Khmer gilded bronze dancer.

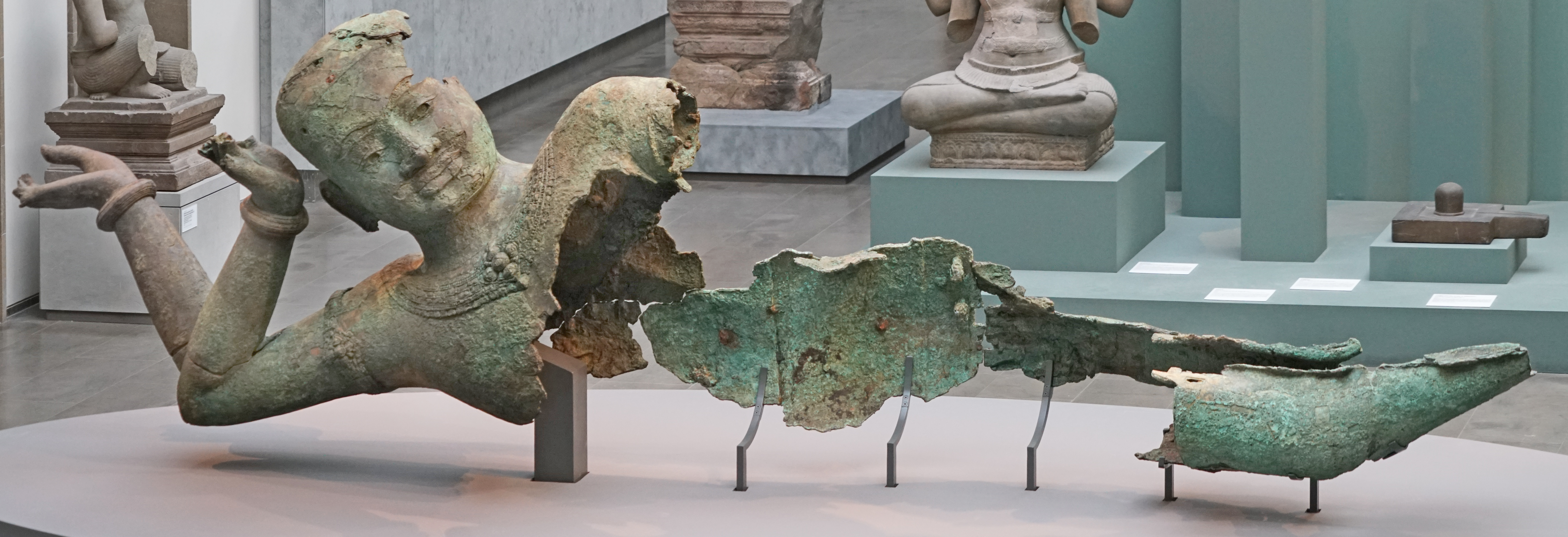
1000s AD Reclining Vishnu of West Mebon, Southeast Asia's largest historic bronze at six+ meters, or some 20 feet long.

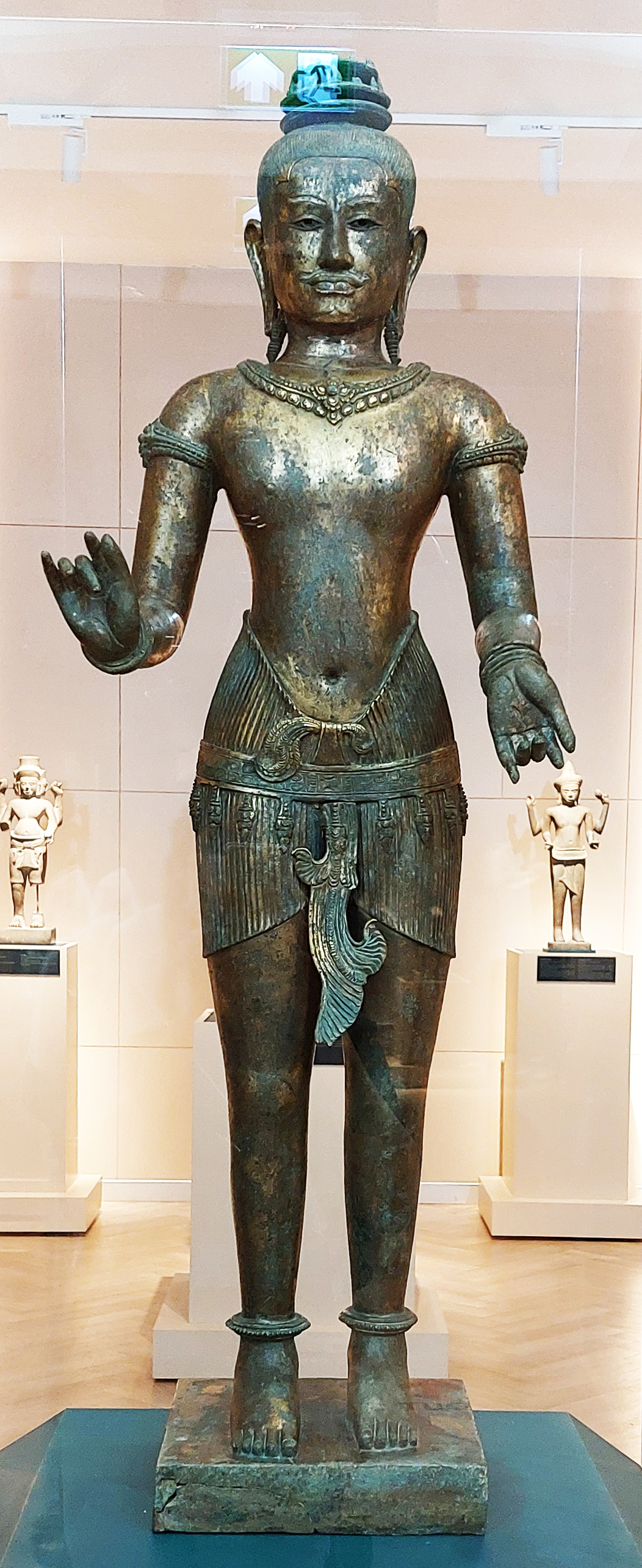
1000s AD gilt Khmer bronze in chong kben (Golden Boy).

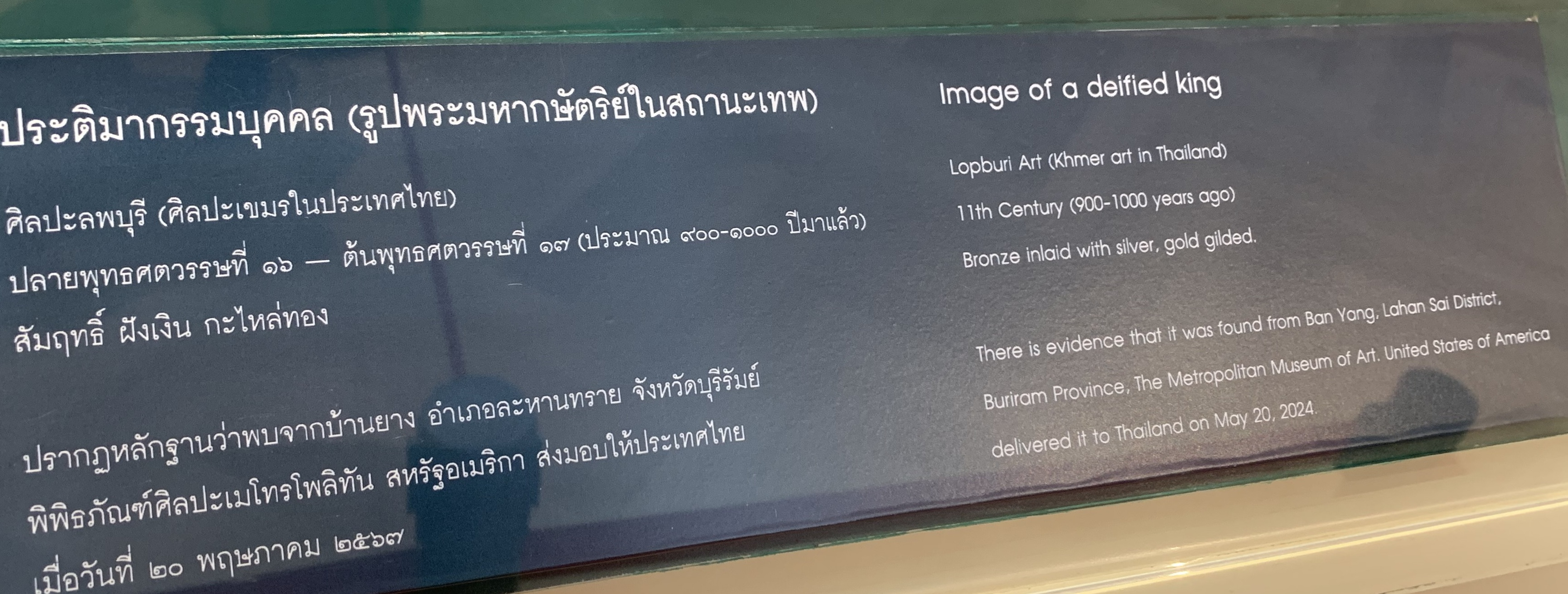
Thai museum identifying "Golden Boy" as Khmer.

Burial sites in Cambodia have uncovered metallic items such as bells and jewelry, and excavations have revealed not only weapons, bowls, and jewelry but tools for metalworking, like crucibles and molds. The Old Khmer word for bronze is samrit and experts believe there was significant metal production in historic Cambodia. The skill of metalworking was seen as a divine gift by ancient Khmers. Both Hindu and Buddhist Khmer bronzes, the oldest bearing Indian styles, appear in the 600sAD Chenla period, before Angkor.

During the Angkorian period of the Khmer Empire (800s-1400s CE), the "sacred" skill of metalworking was tied to Khmer rulers who viewed themselves as god kings. Inscriptions tell us Khmer royals and elites commissioned bronze sculptures from skilled artists. A royal foundry for bronze art and item creations, and whose activity peaked in the 11th century, was unearthed at Angkor Thom by archaeologists in 2012, north of where the capital's Royal Palace would have been. Larger bronze sculpture were associated with the kings and their power and housed in temples for worshippers, whereas mid-size bronzes were created for rituals and processions. Small figures in the homes of believers could be offered to temples. Bronzes bore intricate, careful details regardless of size.

The Buddha sheltered by a naga became a popular image during the Angkor era as it's associated with the divine and protection. Lists uncovered from this period revealed the weight, material, and features of items belonging to temples, including those of copper, gold, and silver. Representations of Lokeshvara and Prajnaparamita, as well as the Buddha seated on a naga, were popular with Khmer artists. Shiva in multiple forms was represented by bronze sculptors during the Angkor era as well. Copper and bronze, bearing the same patterns found carved into the stone, were used to adorn temples in the 12th and 13th centuries.

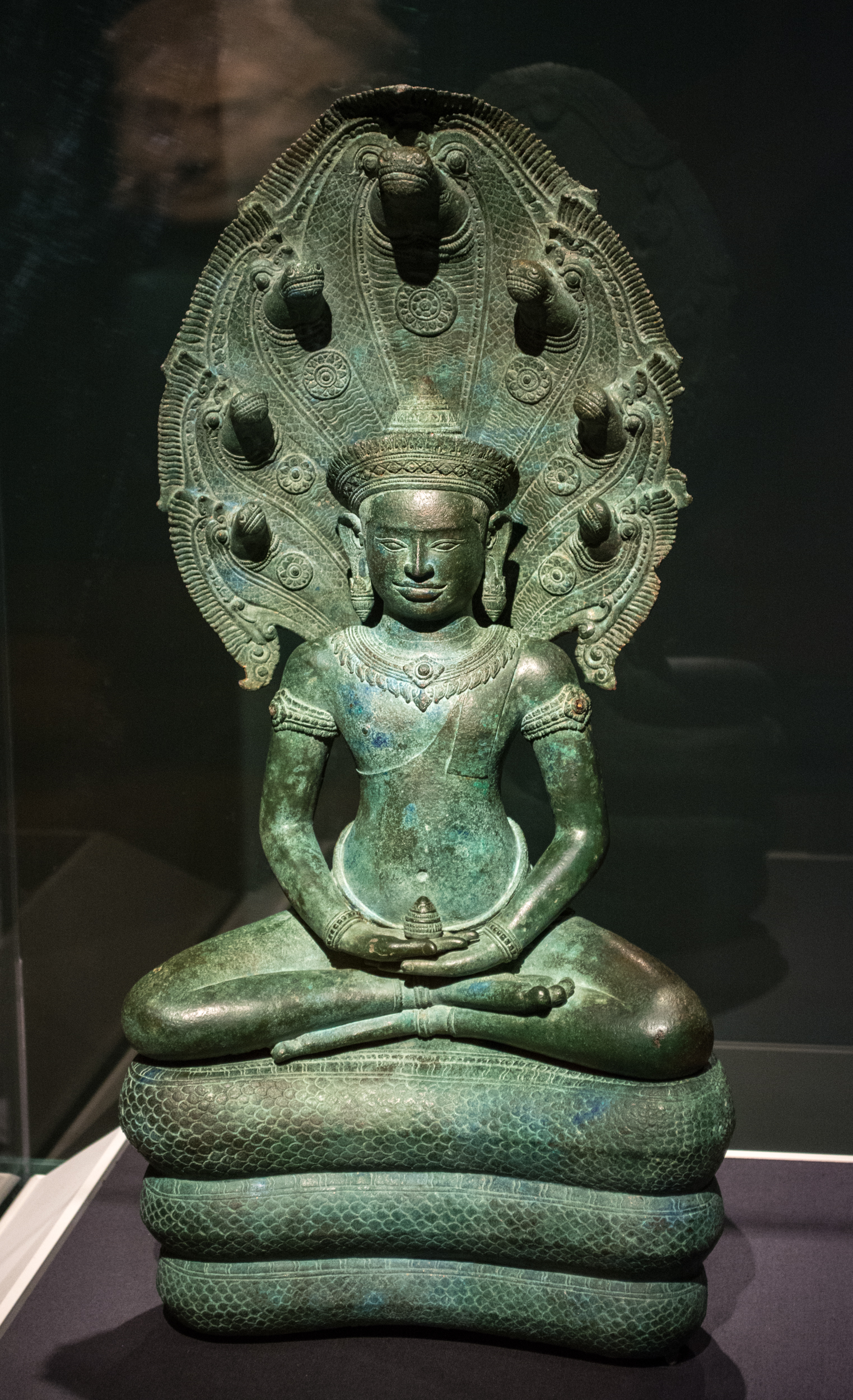
1100s AD Khmer bronze Buddha enthroned and protected by a naga, Banteay Chhmar.

During Cambodia's Middle Period, or the early 15th to mid-19th centuries, believers made merit by commissioning metal statues of ancestors and Theravada Buddhist divinities. Changes in rulers often meant the creation or destruction of metal images. The recycling of metal objects, via crucible and recasting, was regularly carried out by the Khmer for the creation of new holy items and images. By the 1500s, the style and iconography of Khmer metalwork was adapted by the Siamese sculptors in Ayutthaya for their own Buddhist and Hindu bronzes.

Production of metal sculpture remained tied to the king and valued and essential to religion by the Khmers. Metal workshops have been fixtures of Khmer capitals from Angkor to Longvek, Oudong and now Phnom Penh.

In 1936, a villager named Chhit-Lat claimed he dreamed that the Buddha told him to rescue a figure that was buried and trapped. He journeyed to the West Mebon and, three feet down, uncovered some of a huge bronze statue consisting of a head, hand, and shoulder. Experts arrived to see the enormous bronze figure of a reclining Vishnu, a pose common in Khmer art, asleep on a large serpent named Ananta. The statue, nicknamed the “Cambodian Mona Lisa”, and also referred to as the Reclining Vishnu of West Mebon and the West Mebon Vishnu, is of bronze, silver, lead, mercury gilding, and cinnabar. Considered a masterpiece, the restored sculpture is usually housed at the National Museum in Phnom Penh.

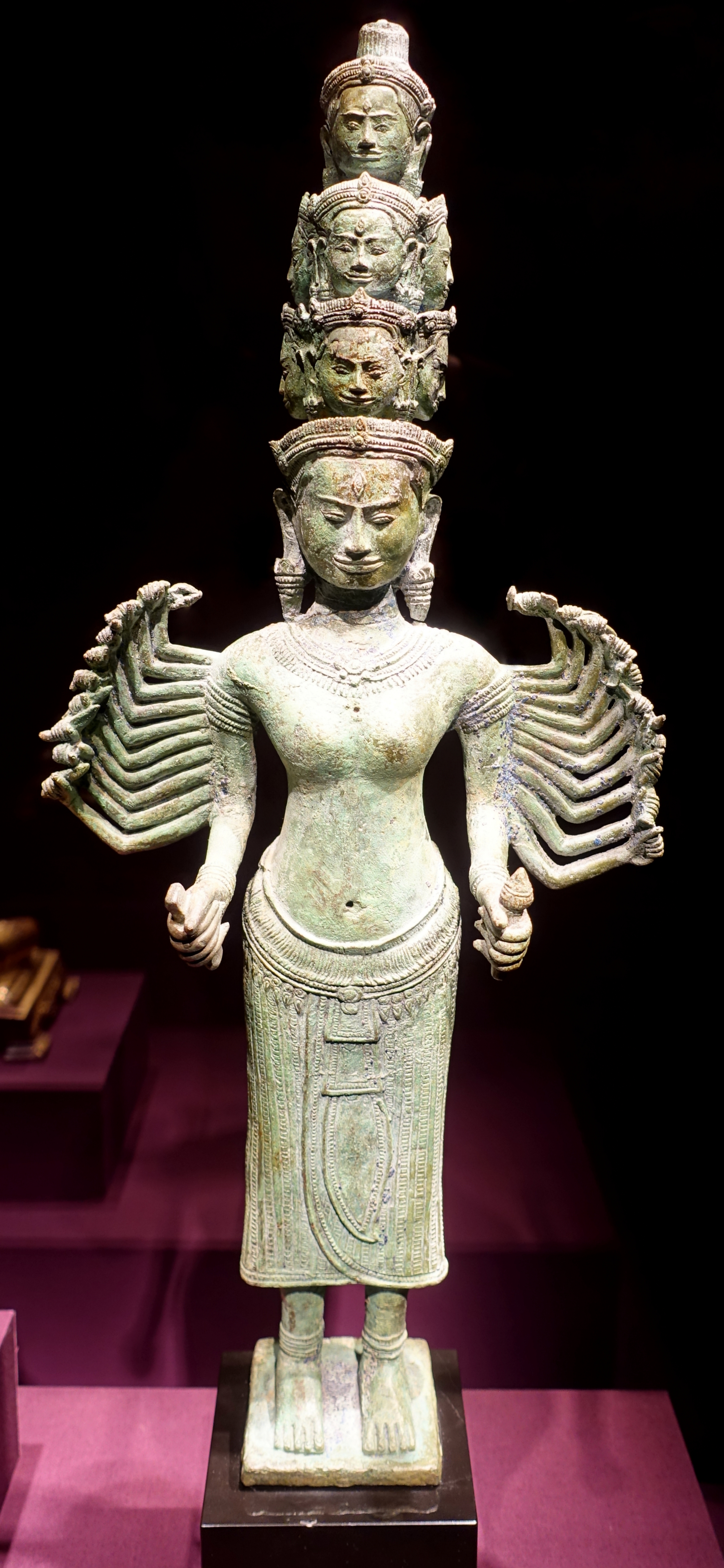
1200s AD Khmer Prajñāpāramitā copper alloy, Bayon style.

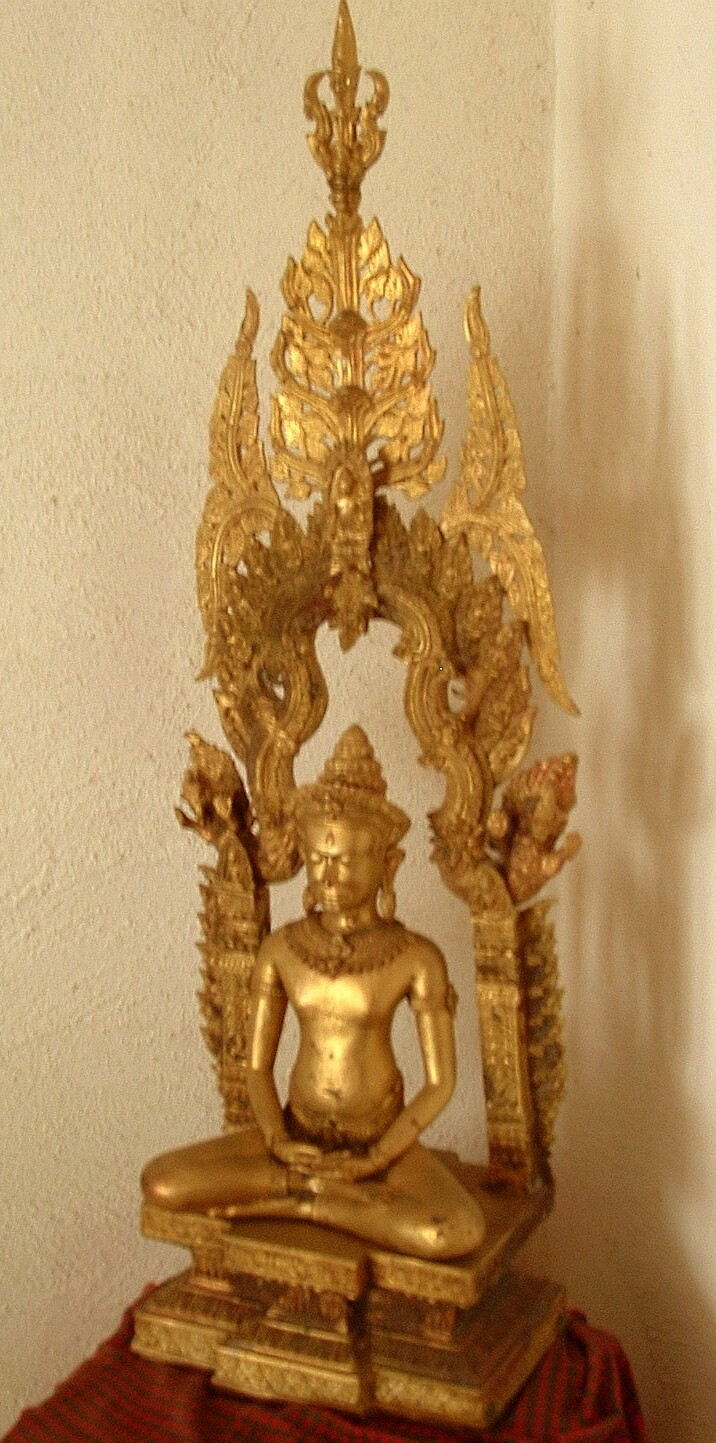
1100s AD Khmer bronze enthroned meditating Buddha.

Known as the "Golden Boy," a gilt Khmer statue of copper alloy with inlaid silver discovered in 1974 by a Khmer-speaking woman in Buriram Province, a part of Thailand that belonged to the Khmer Empire, was sent back to Thailand by the Met in 2024. The Met calls the image "the most complete extant gilded-bronze image from Angkor" and the item is part of an exclusive collection of metal images of Hindu gods tied to the Devaraja (a god-king, or "deified monarch") cult that were found in Khmer territories in modern Cambodia and northeast Thailand. Depicted in jewels and an elaborate sampot chong kben, this and its “naturalism” suggests the figure might be a composite “representing a cult icon for worship in a royal sanctuary and also acting as an ancestor image of a deceased ruler". Called 'Standing Shiva' on the Met website and referred to originally as “Cambodian,” Martin Lerner, curator of Indian and Southeast Asian Art at the Met from 1972 to 2003, wrote in 1989 that the statue likely depicts a "devaraja." Expert consensus aligns with Lerner's suggestion that it's Khmer King Jayavarman VI, “whose accession took place in 1080.” The Met called the Golden Boy “the most important gift of Southeast Asian sculpture ever made to our collection,” and the response demonstrates the influence of the Hindu-Buddhist Khmer Empire across the border into what’s now Thailand. It’s believed the 51-inch Angkor-era statue was stolen by British thief Douglas Latchford in the 1970s.

1,000 Years: Angkor-style bronzes by Khmer artists today.

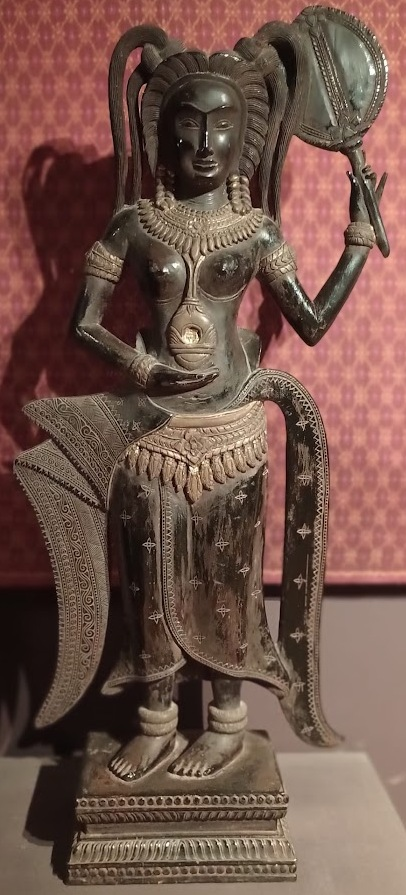
Devata in floral sampot.

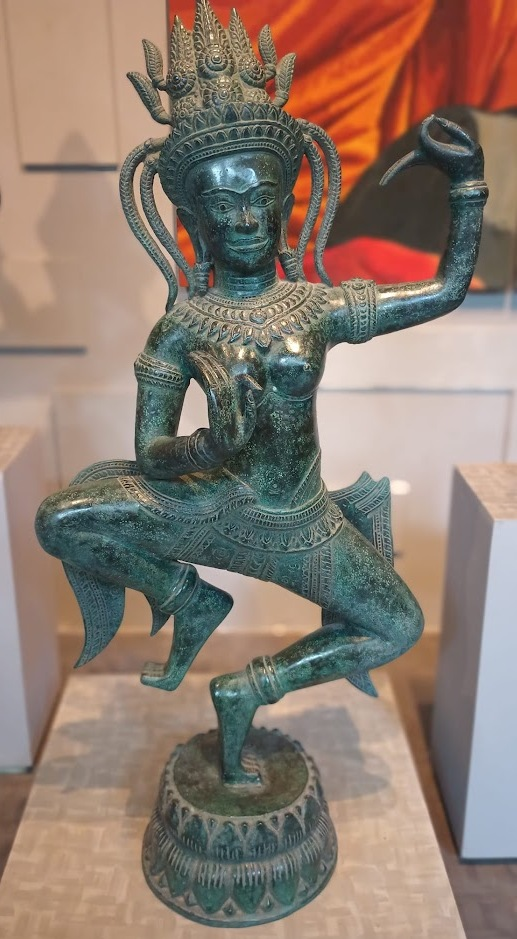
Dancing apsara.

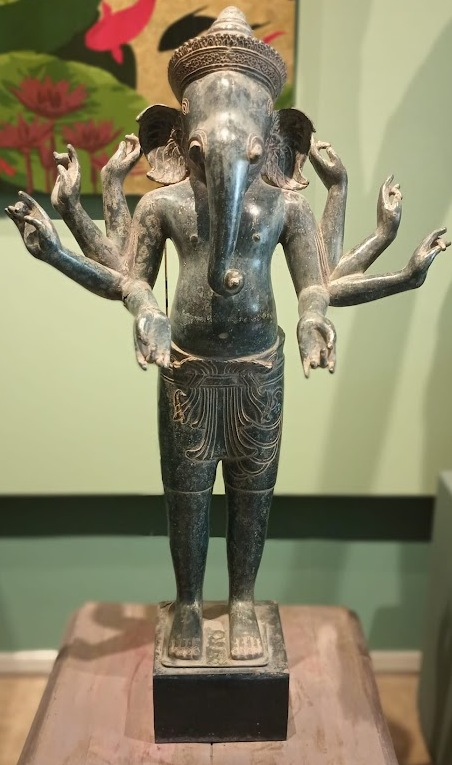
Ganesh, a Hindu figure.

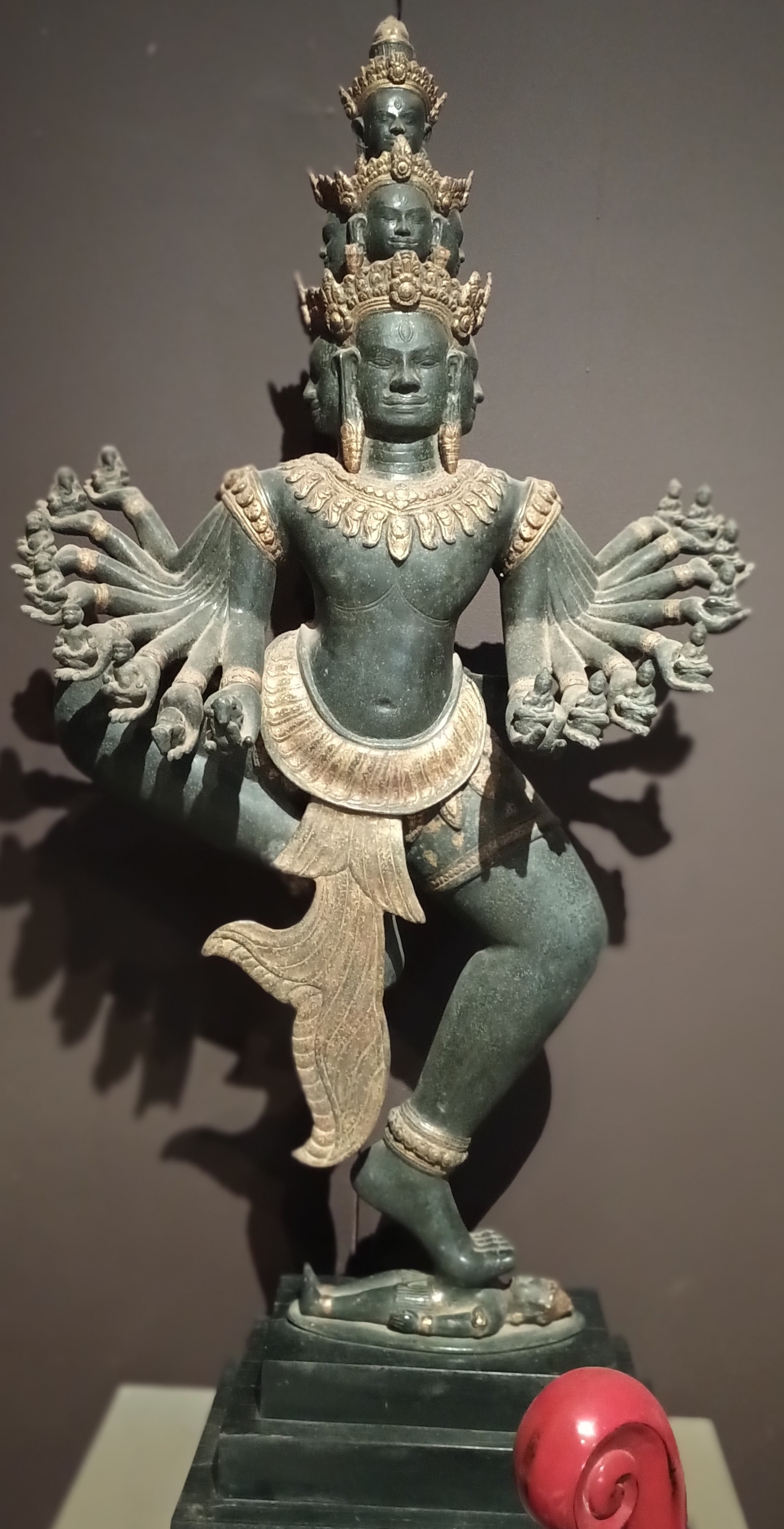
Khmer Hevajra in chong kben.

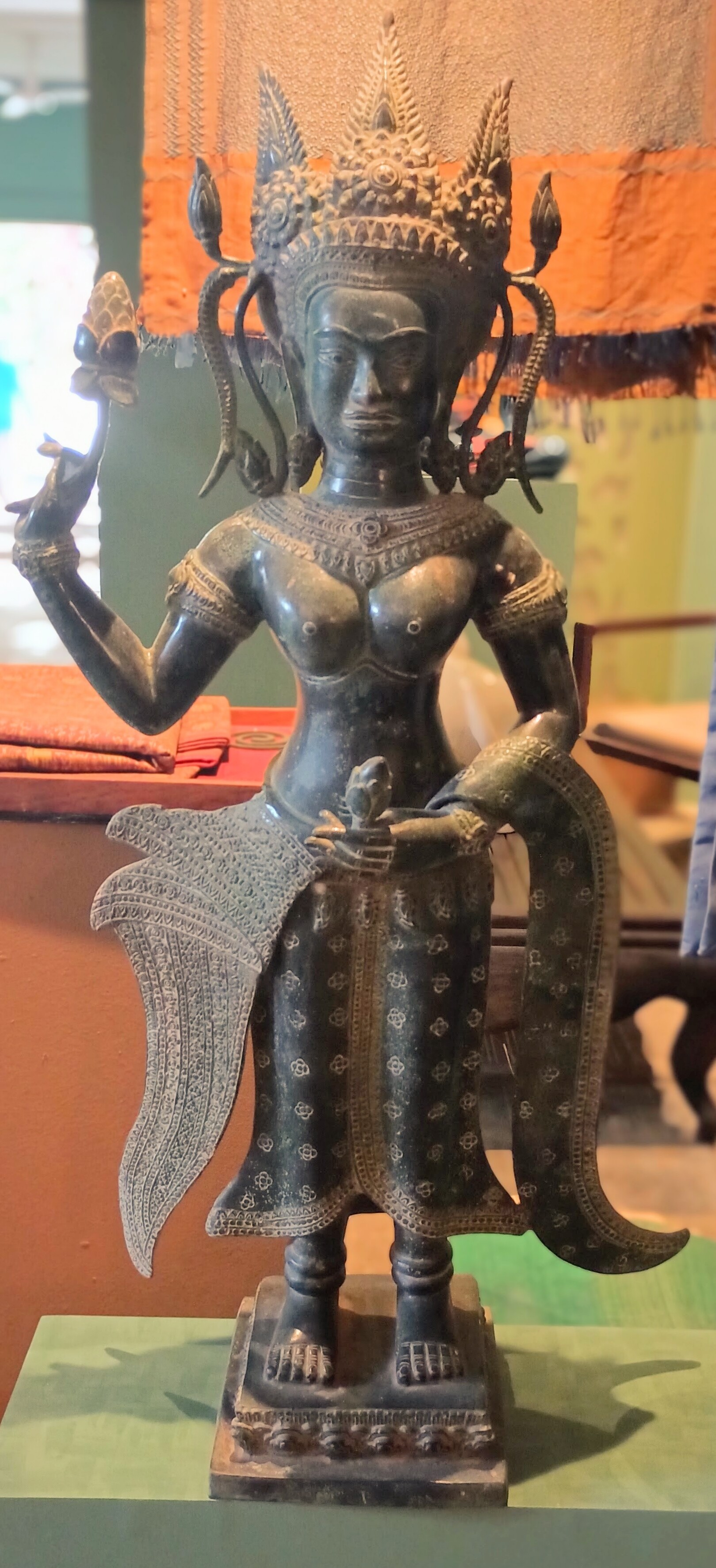
Devata in floral sampot.

Titled "Royal Bronzes: Cambodian Art of the Divine," an exhibition featuring rare 10th-13th century Khmer bronzes - including the West Mebon Vishnu - toured internationally, including the Guimet National Museum of Asian Arts in Paris, France, and then to the only U.S. showing at the Minneapolis Institute of Art (Mia) October 2025 - January 2026. There were five main categories of the exhibition: The Origins of Copper Metallurgy; Casting for the King; Honoring the Gods; New World, New Places, New Faith; and The West Mebon Vishnu: A Rebirth, focused on the study and reconstruction of the Vishnu unearthed in 1936. The exhibition includes 176 items total: 49 from the Guimet in Paris and 127 from Phnom Penh, Cambodia’s National Museum. Upon the conclusion of the MIA exhibit, the bronze Vishnu continued to the Smithsonian National Museum of Asian Art (Washington, D.C., USA) and then to be displayed at San Francisco, California, USA’s, Asian Art Museum until 2027.

Preah Ang Chek and Preah Ang Chorn in shrine, Siem Reap.

In 2022, a 60 tonne, 21m (about 70 ft) high copper sculpture, the largest in Cambodia, was erected in Preah Sihanouk. Depicted are Neang Neak and Preah Thong from the founding legend of the Khmer people. Cambodian artists such as Ith Sopheap today demonstrate the same eight-step lost-wax casting method used by the Khmer since at least the sixth century. The coppersmith, who has a workshop in Preah Dak (a popular village in Siem Reap province), spent 30 years making sculptures such as apsaras and Vishnu. The Royal Palace commissioned Sopheap’s work for 12 copper statues of Angkorian warriors, each 2.1m (or almost seven feet) high. In 2023, the statues were erected in a Siem Reap park next to Preah Ang Chek Preah Ang Chorm shrine, which themselves are bronze statues.

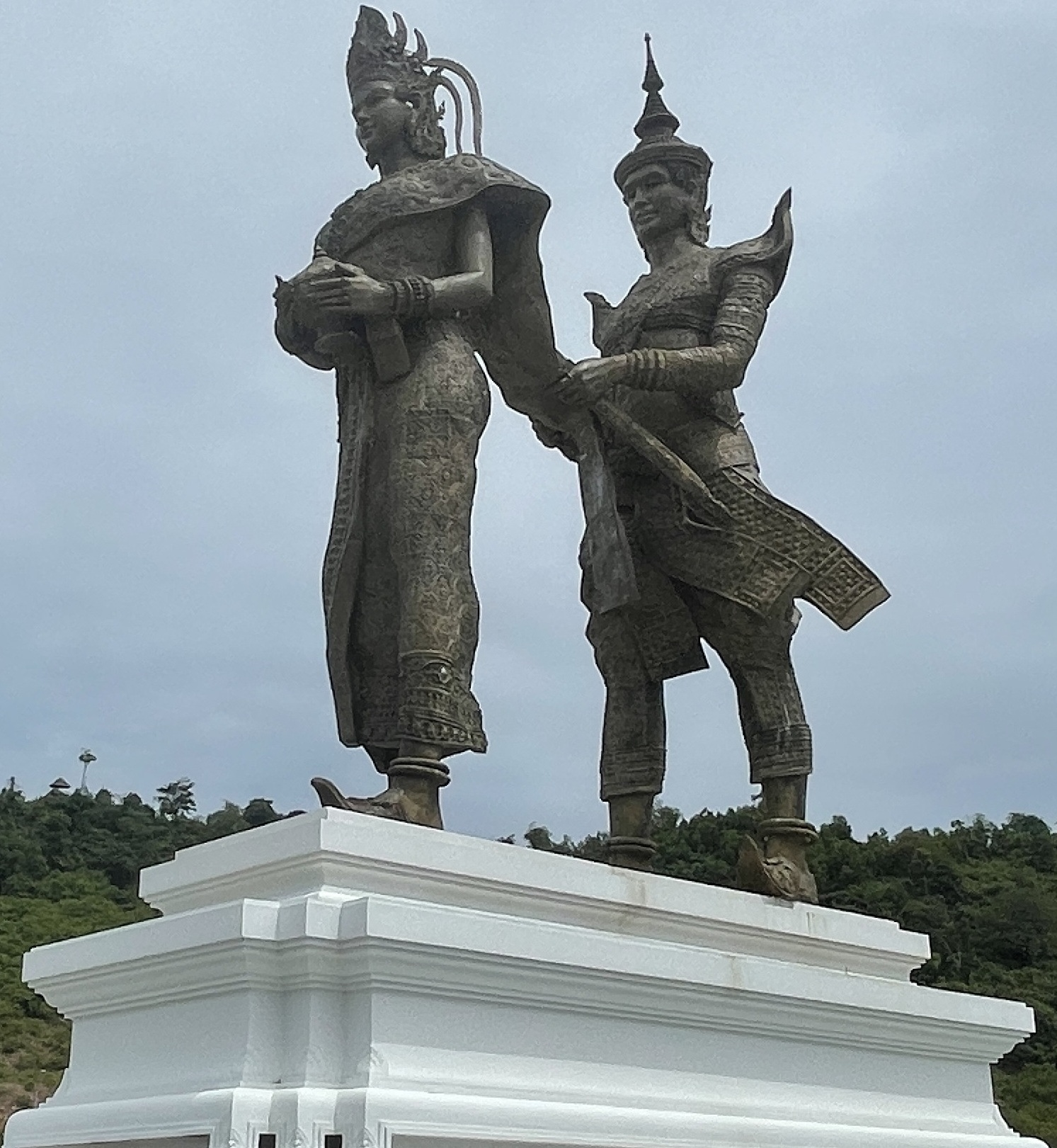
2022 AD copper of Neang Neak & Preah Thong, Sihanoukville.

Metalsmith Sovannvibol Sok takes a minimum of three days to sketch and carve copper for his works, and then about eight hours to shape. Sok is driven to both preserve and push Khmer art forward, particularly Khmer kbach (decor/patterns). Artist Ouk Chim Vichet turns scrap metal into art that expresses Cambodian identity. A teacher of Architecture and Urbanism at the Royal University of Fine Arts in Phnom Penh, he once repurposed weapons into items of peace as a student at Peace Art Project of Cambodia (co-healmed by British artist Sasha Constable) before working with stone and wood on top of discarded metal. His most famous sculpture, the Apsara Warrior, was showcased at the University of Michigan Museum of Art.

=== Wood carving ===
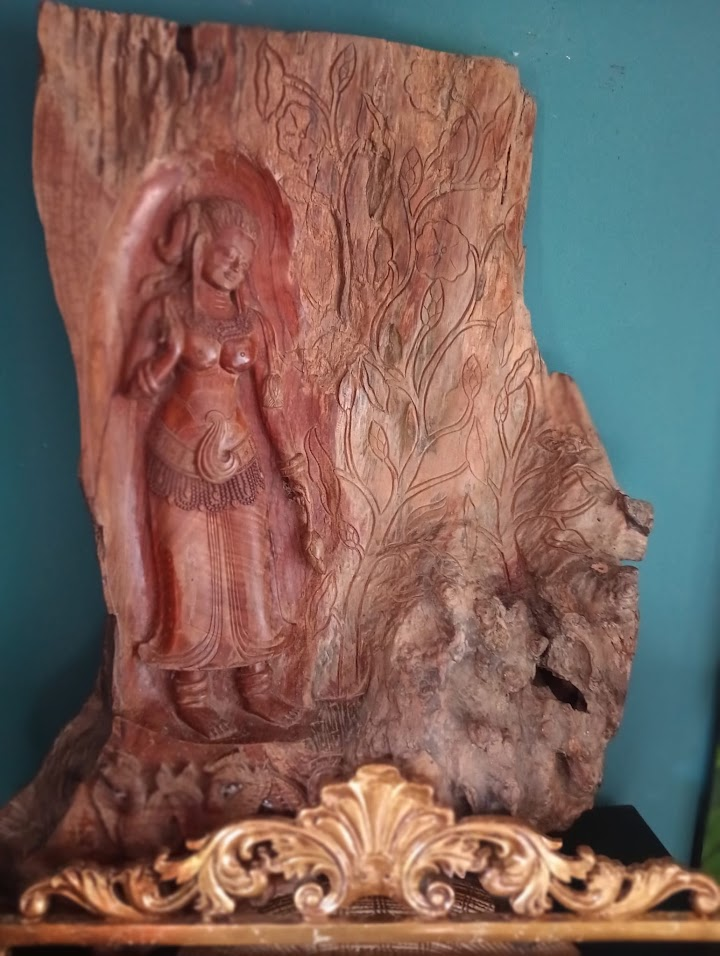
Modern wood carving of devata.

As wood is a perishable material, few wooden sculptures survived the Angkor era and those that did were crafted in Angkor’s latest years. As Theravada Buddhism became the dominant religion, the practice of stone-carving faded and wood became the material of choice for Khmer sculpture. Historically, Cambodians have crafted from wood apsaras, Buddha sculptures, religious stories, and more to decorate temples, pagodas, and even houses. In the post-Angkorian era, artists would apply lacquer to wooden sculpture for decorative and protective purposes, as well as inlay mother of pearl, ivory, and vitrified lead as ornamental features for wooden sculpture. Post-Angkor Khmer wood-carving is usually styled in the elemental themes of earth, air, wind, and water. The meaningful, valuable practice of Khmer wood working survives in the living, breathing intricate wood work of Khmer artists today.

== Painting ==
=== Murals ===
The most ancient mural paintings of any kind in Cambodia attributed to the 10th-11th century, are those of Prasat Neang Khmau, located south of Kor Ker, depicting scenes with Hindu themes. However, little remains of them today. The earliest epigraphic evidence of painted scrolls appears inscription K. 285 dated to 1593 in Phnom Bakeng. The oldest documented Buddhist paintings are dated to 1877, consist of 14 small paintings (1 x 1.20 m), on cloth, illustrating episodes of the Vessantara Jataka. As in most Buddhist societies, stories from the lives of the Buddha are a common source of inspiration for the majority of paintings.

Because of destruction during recent war, few historic wat murals remain in Cambodia. In the 1960s, art historians Guy and Jacqueline Nafilyan photographed 19th-century murals, providing a record of this lost cultural heritage. The best known surviving murals are at the Silver Pagoda in Phnom Penh, Wat Rajabo in Siem Reap province, and Wat Kompong Tralach Leu in Kompong Chhnang Province. In the last decade, wat murals have seen a resurgence.

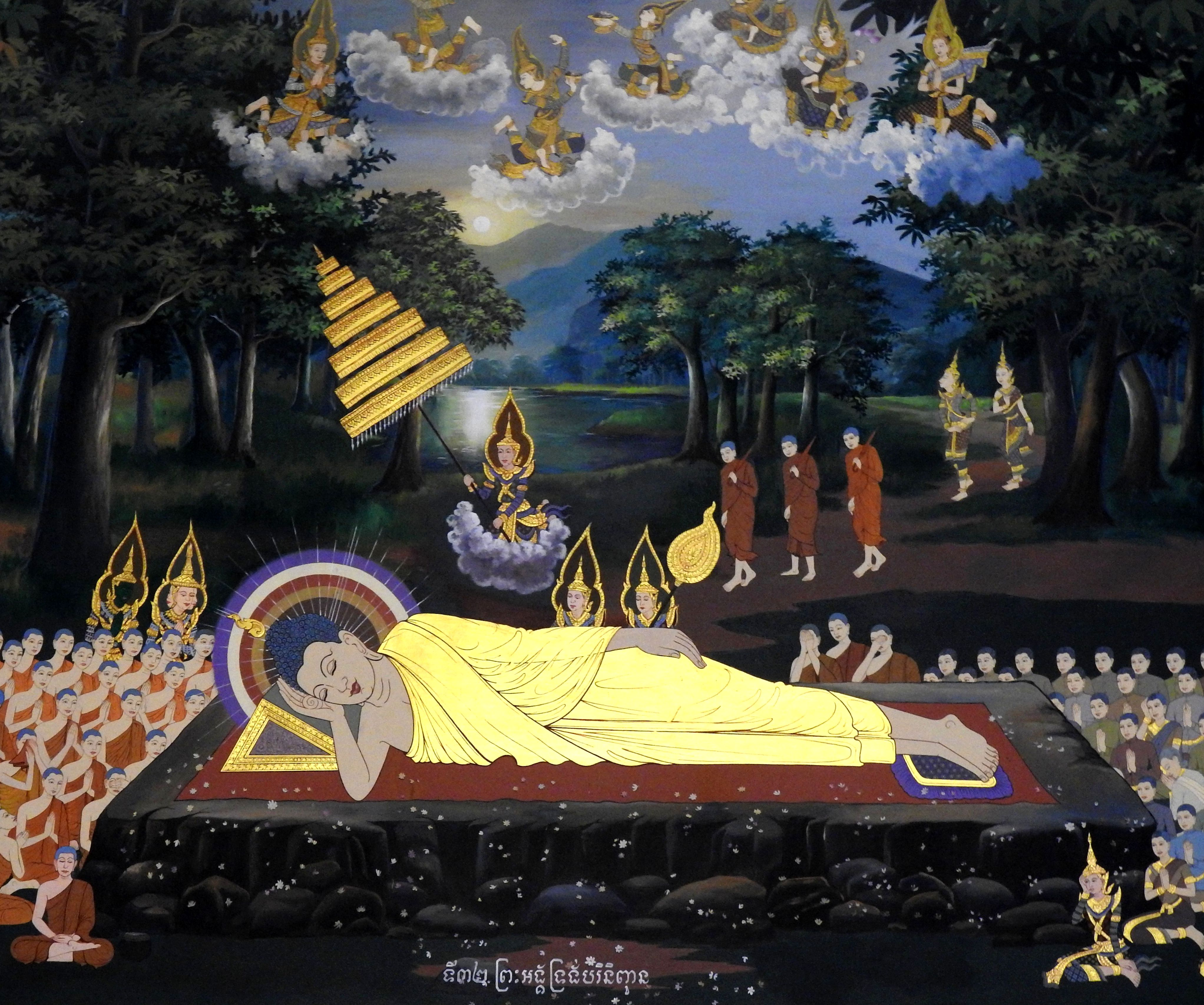
A mural of Gautama Buddha gaining nirvana; Wat Botum

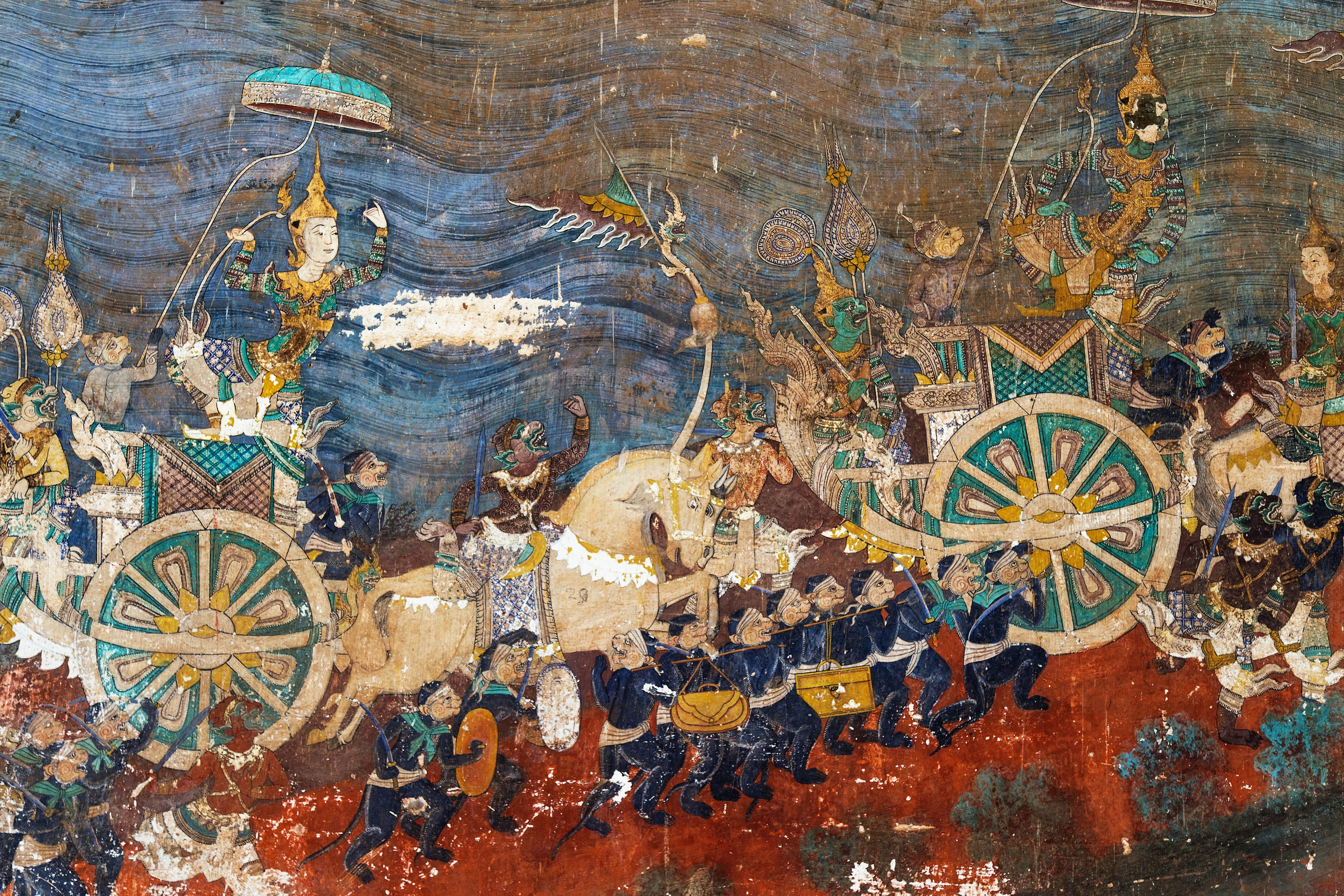
A Ramayana mural at Phnom Penh's Silver Pagoda (1)

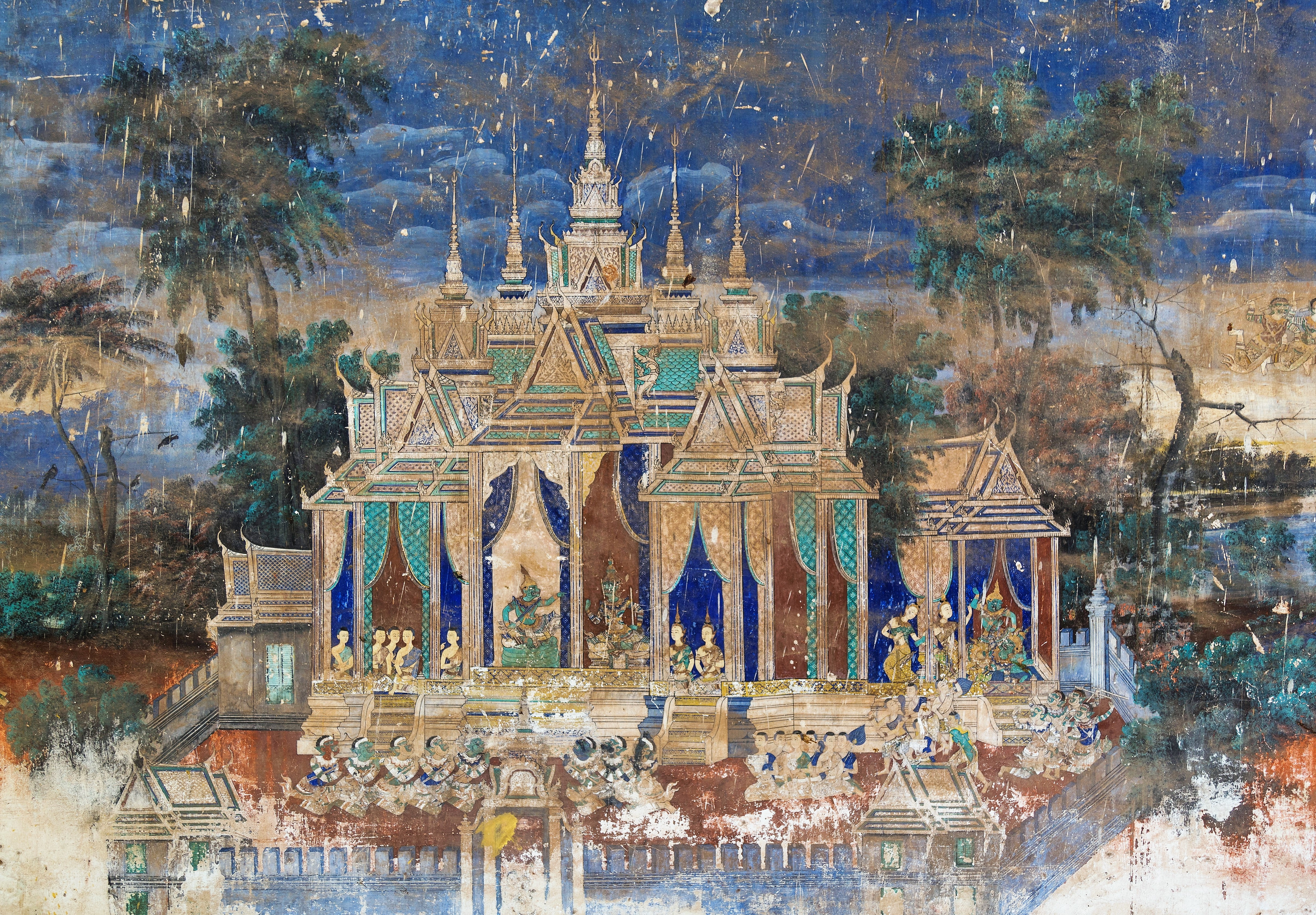
A Ramayana mural at Phnom Penh's Silver Pagoda (2)

=== Banners / Scrolls ===
Preah Bot (Khmer: ព្រះបត), often called painted banners or scrolls, are paintings of Buddhist images on cloth incorporating a sewn tube at the top and base for inserting a wooden pole to hang the painting the keep it flat. The making of a preah bot is imbedded in the concept of merit-making through the production of a modest representation of devotion and the spreading of Buddhism. In 1899, Adhémard Leclère, a French scholar-administrator, wrote that painted scrolls were hung in monasteries and terraces to share the Dharma.

They are usually painted on cotton or silk. However, some old preah bot can also be found painted on roughly woven cloth. The centers of their production have historically been Phnom Penh and Battambang, followed by Siem Reap. Preah bot are typically presented by lay people to monasteries during religious festivals, but they can also be found on display in private homes for festivals, weddings, and anniversaries of the deceased. They are further used in various religious ceremonies outside of monasteries and homes, including the setting up of the central pole of the village and ceremonial cutting of the top-knot of children.

== Textiles ==
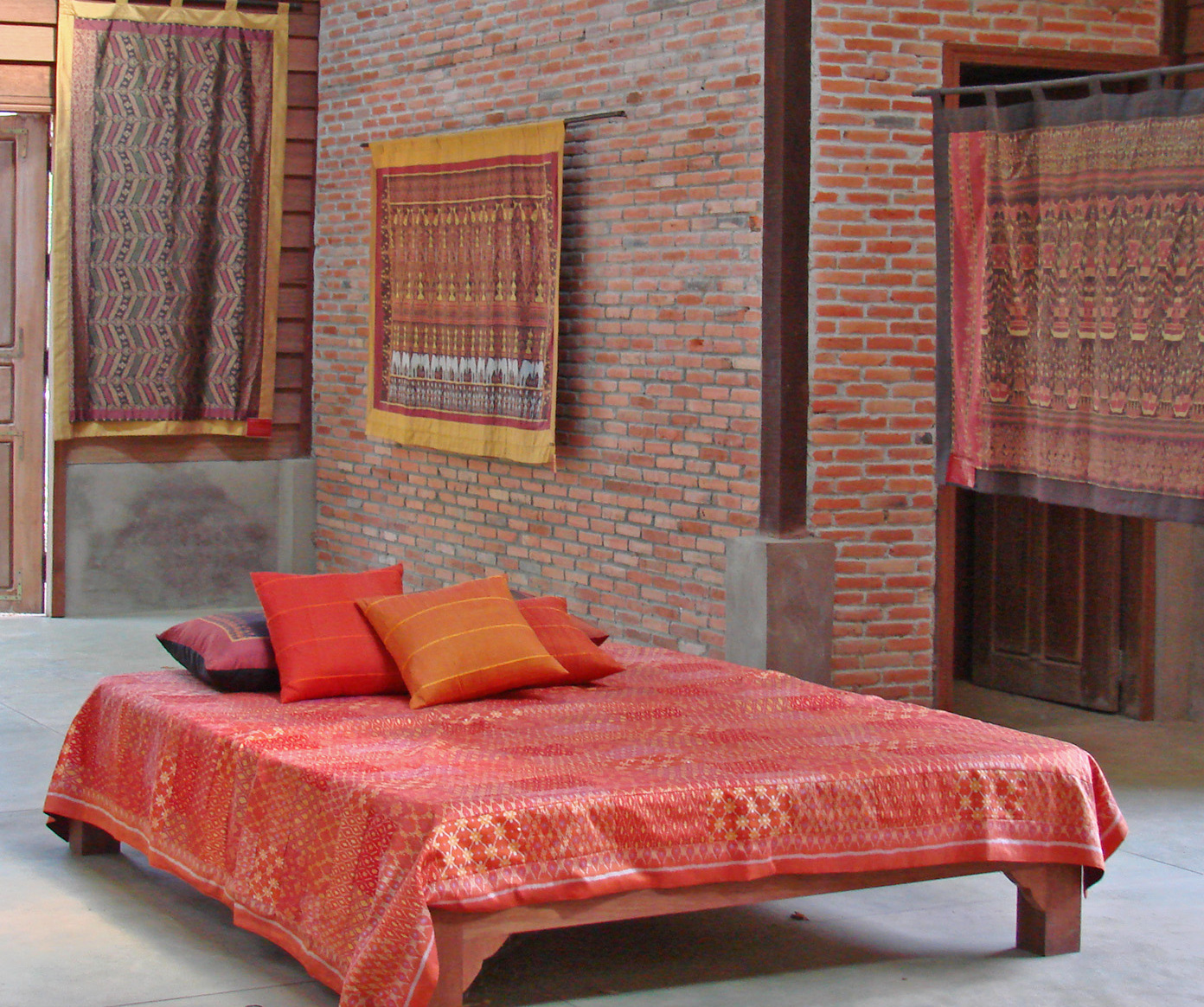
Khmer textiles at Artisans Angkor.

In the third century CE, Eastern Wu Chinese diplomats Kang Tai and Zhu Ying were sent as envoys to Funan. According to Kang Tai’s report Wu Shi Wai Guo Chuan (Narrative of Foreign Countries in the Wu Period), after the king ordered men to cover themselves, the envoy observed that the wealthy cut brocade for their garments whereas the poor utilized plain cloth.

In 1225, Chinese customs inspector Zhao Rukuo reported that Cambodia, referred to as Zhenla, exported raw silk and cotton via merchant shipping. Later in the 13th century, Zhou Daguan reported that the "locals" of the Angkor region didn't produce silk or use needle and thread, but observed instead that they'd "weave cotton from kapok" on a backstrap loom. He mentioned that people from Siam came to Angkor and wove "black patterned satiny silk".

In a 1941 letter by Thailand's Prince Narisara Nuwattiwong, he states the knowledge and methods used for Thailand's royal silk mills came from the Khmers.

Cambodia's modern silk-weaving centers are Takéo, Battambang, Beanteay Meanchey, Siem Reap and Kampot provinces. Silk-weaving has seen a major revival recently, with production doubling over the past ten years. This has provided employment for many rural women. Cambodian silk is generally sold domestically, where it is used in sampots, furnishings, and pidan (pictorial tapestries), but interest in international trade is increasing. Traditionally, Cambodian textiles have employed natural dyes. Red dye comes from lac insect nests, blue dye from indigo, yellow and green dye from prohut bark, and black dye from ebony bark. Khmer patterned silks traditionally feature two borders, the central field, and two end panels.

=== Golden Khmer Silk ===
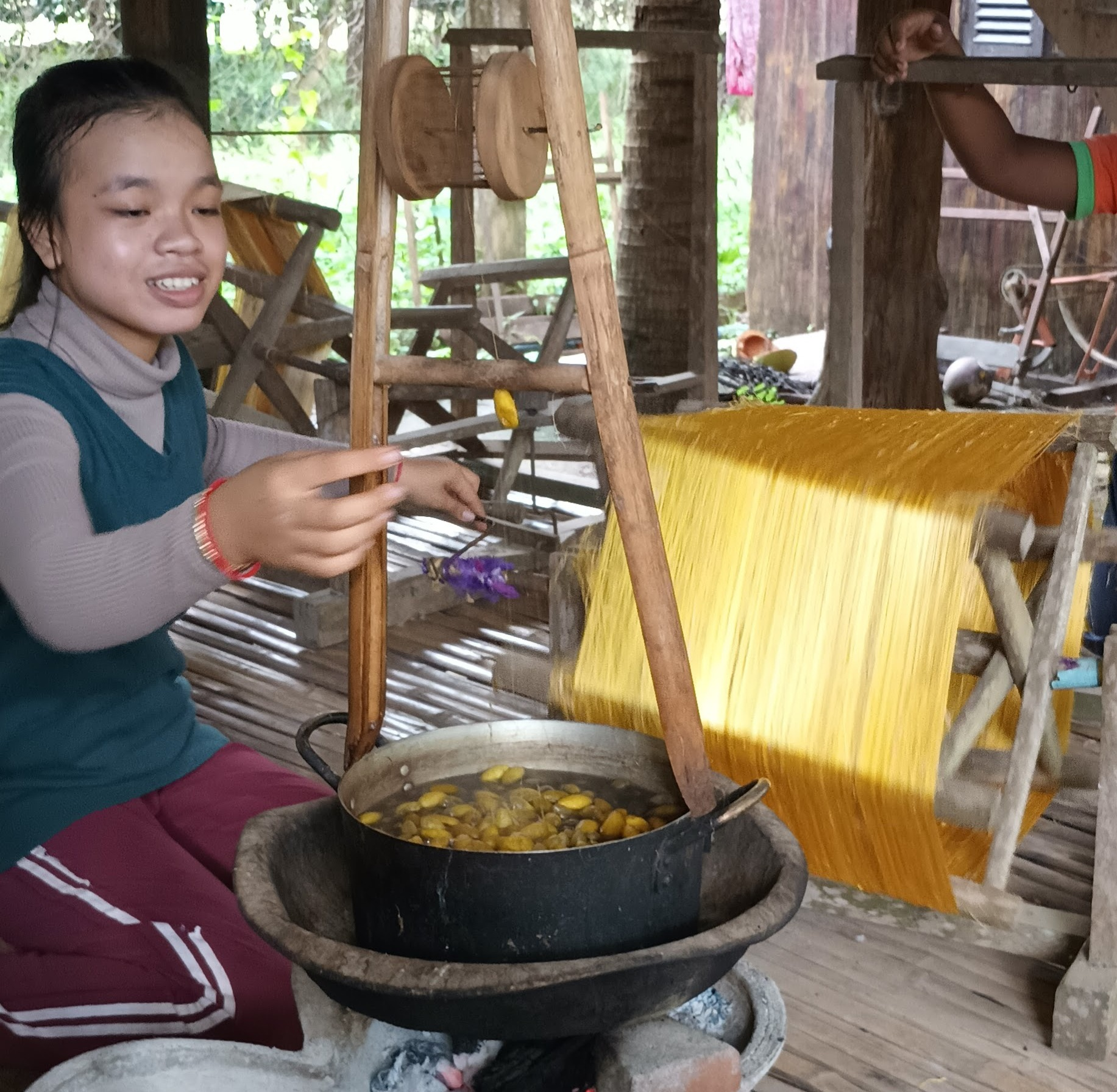
Khmer silk weaver.

Golden Khmer Silk is a rare silk that an indigenous yellow silkworm native to Cambodia, called Bombyx mori polyvoltin, spins from their multivoltine cocoons which are smaller than that of white silkworms. 95% of Cambodia's silk is the low-cost, imported white variety, making it difficult for the rare, high quality Golden Khmer Silk to compete. The white silk yields up to 1,400 meters whereas the golden produces only 300 to 400 meters. The rare golden silk can be spun into fabrics worth more than $10,000. Production of Golden Khmer Silk is labor and time intensive.

The practice nearly vanished during Pol Pot's regime in the 1970s. Golden Silk Pheach was launched in 2002 by Oum Sophea to protect and teach the old craft. Driven to "rebuild the prestige of the Khmer culture," only Golden Khmer Silk is used and the org currently provides opportunities for rural women in Siem Reap Province, and nurtures and preserves a part of Khmer culture. In 2021, there were some 45,000 Mulberry trees dotting the Golden Silk Pheach site.

Morn Sareouth is from a sericulture and weaving community in Banteay Meanchey province’s Phnom Srok (town) and started Khmer Golden Silk in Siem Reap Province after forming a team of silk-weavers in 2003. In addition to Siem Reap Province (known for pidan production as well as traditional silk), Sareouth sources silk from Takeo (renowned for its silk) and Banteay Meanchey (important producer of silk) provinces. Khmer Golden Silk provides employment for villages caring for the elderly or raising children alone. The women producing silk in early 2025 ranged from age 30 to 94. Pheng Sophal’s company Kei Khmer utilizes two kinds of silk, including Golden Khmer Silk which is mostly woven by hand. Specialities include kramas, hol products, checkered cloth, and phamuong products.

For Golden Khmer Silk, challenges include a decline in producers as young women seek factory work in cities, climate and environmental factors impacting cultivation, and the internal market not meeting demand due to handmade techniques. In response, the Cambodian government set up culture-focused events including silk exhibitions and workshops, documentaries, and implemented formal support systems to motivate, protect, and assist rural silk workers. The Cambodia Silk Sector Promotion and Development Committee (SDC) is exploring places in Mondulkiri and Ratanakiri ideal for raising silkworms and planting mon trees, a food source for the worms.

Golden Khmer Silk has received international attention in recent years. In 2025, Rautenstrauch-Joest Museum in Cologne obtained and showcased a Golden Khmer Silk textile created by Golden Silk Pheach. Another Golden Khmer Silk item was displayed at the Royal Danish Library in Copenhagen, Denmark.

=== Chong kiet method ===
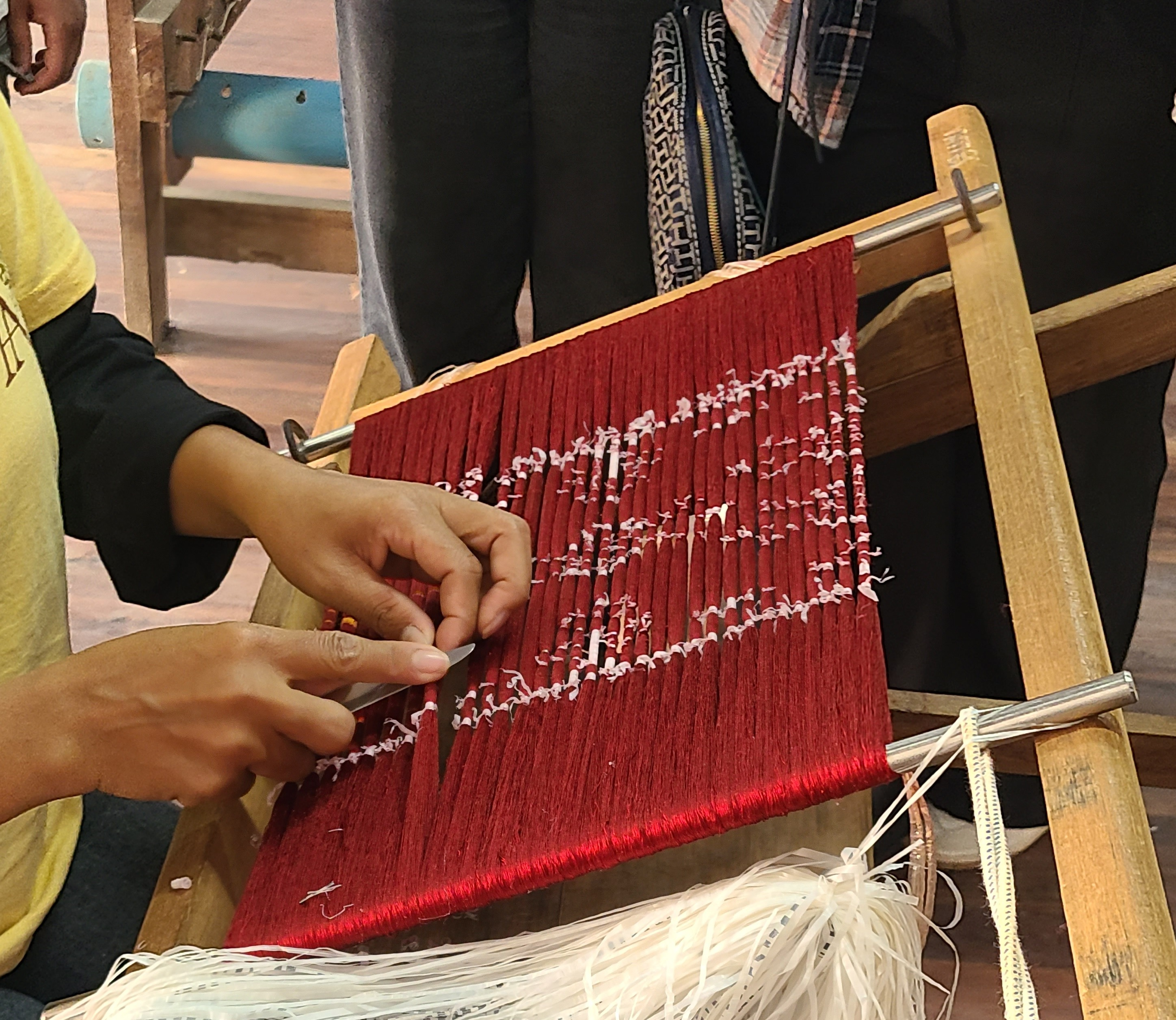
Khmer chong kiet (ikat) technique.

Chong kiet is the Khmer ikat technique. The term refers to the "tying of partial sections of the weft yarn with fiber for resist dyeing that creates patterns on the yarn before weaving." In Khmer, chong kiet means "tying strings." As a verb, kiet means "tighten, roll up, draw up." Derived from Indian influences, this traditional, highly-complex Khmer silk ikat technique was later adopted by the court of Siam.

=== Silk hol ===
Unique to Cambodian silk weaving is the use of uneven twill groundweave with the chong kiet technique. This yields single or two-color fabrics, which are produced by weaving three threads so that the "color of one thread dominates on one side of the fabric, while the two others determine the color on the reverse side." The result is a brighter tone on one side, while the shade of the pattern remains consistent. This produces a textile referred to as hol (ហល), as in sampot hol and hol pidan.

It was common for a period that powerful Siamese officials requested hol silk garments from Khmer weavers in Cambodia. Three silk hol-patterned sampot chong kben and “a similarly-patterned silk shoulder cloth” were gifted to American President Franklin Pierce by Siamese King Mongkut for the 1856 Harris Treaty. Writer and archaeologist Lisa McQuail wrote that King Mongkut describes the Thai silk items included in the Harris Treaty Gifts as “second quality,” likely because they were not as fine as the accompanying Khmer silks. Art historian Gillian Green writes that the skill involved in producing the silks reflect a centuries old practice pre-dating modern borders, and that Khmers indigenous to eastern present-day Thailand also utilize this uneven twill whereas the Thais don't.

Traditionally, the hol palette consists of the following colors: yellow; indigo; maroon; red; blue for highlights; red "overdyed with indigo" to get purple, and yellow "overdyed with indigo" to get green.

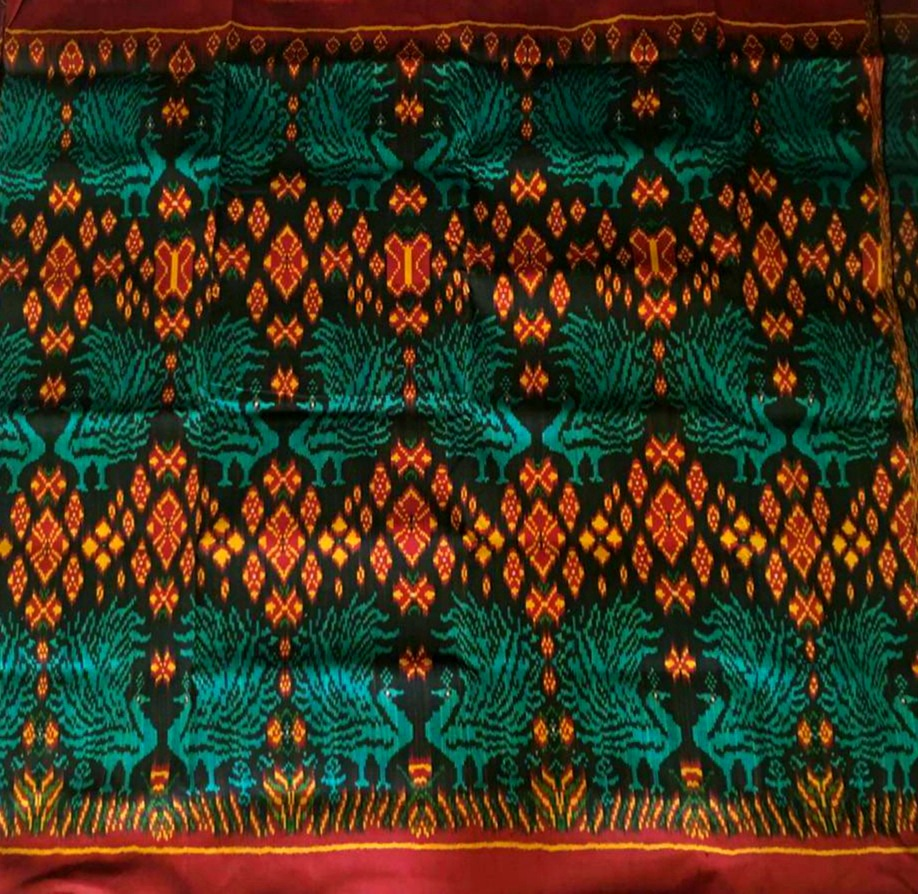
Khmer hol silk fabric.

Hol pidan (ហូលពិតាន) is a silk Khmer pictorial temple hanging. Pidan transliterates as bitan meaning "extension, curtain, canopy," derived from the Sanskrit word vitana, defined as “an awning, canopy or cover.” Angkor era inscriptions reveal a word whose use and description match today’s pidan. The Khmer dictionary defines pidan as ‘ceiling’ or 'canopy,' generally that of a vihear (Buddhist worship hall). Pidan rup duk, meaning "pidan in the style of a boat/ship" ពិតានរបេទក, refers to pidans with ship motifs. Pidan rup preah ពិតានរបេប្រា means "pidan in the holy/deity stylem" and pidan rup prasat ពិតានរបេសាទ is a "pidan in the temple style." A less-common pidan preah is a tiered pidan placed over a Buddha inside a vihear for protection, sometimes with moon and sun icons. Hol pidan may also be hung like a parasol above the Buddha.

Traditionally, pidans are dedicated in the vihear for holy use. In the past, pidans were commissioned by wealthy donors to protect Buddha images in a wat. This earned merit for the donor. Pidans may also function as ‘scenes of paradise’ where they’re placed next to the dying. The pidan-making process can last from three months to a year.

Pidans have three categories of Buddhist themes: Vessantara Jātaka; Prince Siddhartha, and Three Worlds cosmology. Buddhist hol pictorial depictions are crafted to fit one and a half meters (or just under five feet long) of fabric, or twice that, with shorter versions depicting illustrated stories while the longer silks bear repeated thematic icons. Examples of classic figures that portray Jataka tale are white elephants, horses, the Buddha mounted on a pedestal, a Brahman priest in chong kben, and open pagodas housing three figures (likely Prince Vessantara’s family). The first form of the Prince Siddhartha pidans are important life events inleft-to-right, with stylized and flat figures. The second utilize repeated figures that symbolize events of Siddhartha’s life. The third is Three Worlds ត្រៃភូមិ (or Trey Phum, derived from Sanskrit) cosmology. The upper, middle, and lower realms are Tusita and Tavatimsa Heaven, aworld desired by humans, and the final destination of the condemned, respectfully.

Popular motifs of the upper realm are Indra (green of color, parasol in-hand), cloud-mounted religious halls, apsaras, praying worshippers, seated Buddha, and waving banners (tung rolok) and crocodile banners (tung krapeu) held in beaks, on pagodas, and on poles. The middle realm's forest Prei Haembopean is inhabited by composite animals, and also kinnari and kinnara, lions, tigers, elephants, horses, and peacocks. Some creatures feature pagodas mounted on their backs. Moon and sun icons may appear.

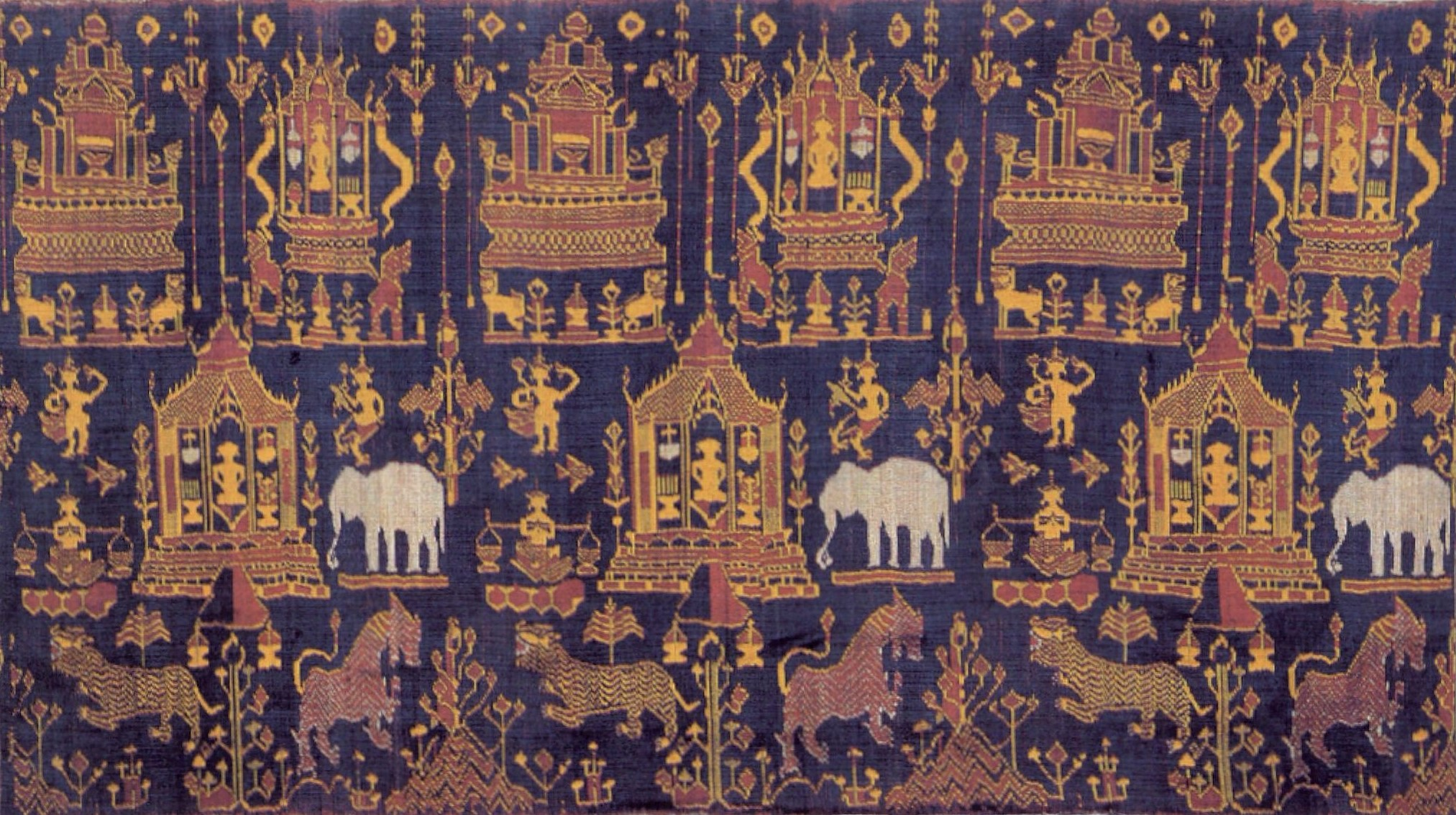
Khmer silk hol pidan.

A small group of antique hol pidan, called pidan rup duk, bear ship motifs. Nagas, birds, lobsters, crabs, fish, rays, turtles, sharks, seahorses, elephants (not white), and also crocodile banners and trees-of-life - which also appear in Buddhist themed hol pidan - may accompany the ships. Ship cloth pidans include 'archaic ships' with a middle superstructure housing figures. Naga finials adorn the ship. Land-based pagodas may also appear, sometimes in threes. 'Sailing ships' depict vessels that visited Cambodia over the centuries, such as Chinese, Arab, and European. Some depict stylized composite ships. 'Symbolic ships' have two categories: as pairs of “stacked layers,” the widest layer being the foundation and rows decreasing in width all the way to the (naga-headed) top. The motif created is a flower mound (phka ben), or even a stupa. The second symbolizes a model ship via an incense holder or banana tree trunk. Both support motifs symbolizing incense or a candle flame.

Pidan production peaked between 1880 and 1930. Pidan weavers always have been mostly women, and the practice is a crucial source of income. Since the 1960s, pidan production began satisfying an artistic market and serving secular purposes. From 1975-1979, Pol Pot’s regime banned silk-weaving, including pidan production. A few survivors retained the skills and techniques required.

Japanese org Caring for Young Refugees initiated weaving workshops in Khao-I-Dang refugee camp on the Thai border in 1980. Via the Cambodian division Caring for Young Khmer (CYK), a small number of Khmer silk weavers made pidans. CYK realized pidan production in Cambodia had ceased almost completely by 1991. By 2014, CYK had trained 172 weavers. In 2010, 2014, 2016, and 2024, Cambodia held hol pidan exhibits. A soft blue palette was welcomed into hol pidan production by weavers trained by CYK. The indigo hues produced a 2014 pidan called 'Wave Pattern.' Seam Soma created this abstract piece with flowing indigo tones zig-zagging like water across the length of the silk.

In 2014, Sueun Serynoch presented a Buddhist Prince Siddhartha-themed pidan in gold, beige, and radiant burgundy dominated by a front and center religious pavilion. The structure is accompanied by a cheering audience, two horse-riders, and two elephants. Weaver Tampo’s pidan presented in 2014 featured nagas and numerous Cambodian animals on soft gold against bold purple with splashes of green and sky blue. Pech Kim wove a deep and tightly-pattern hol pidan exhibited in 2016 that appears abstract but reveals a repetition of ritual items, such as incense and candles. Also in 2016, Soung Mech’s pidan portrayed the birth of the Buddha with servants and gods in bright clothes. The Buddha, left arm raised, has lotus flower-shaped footprints, and the scene repeats five times.

=== Phamuong ===
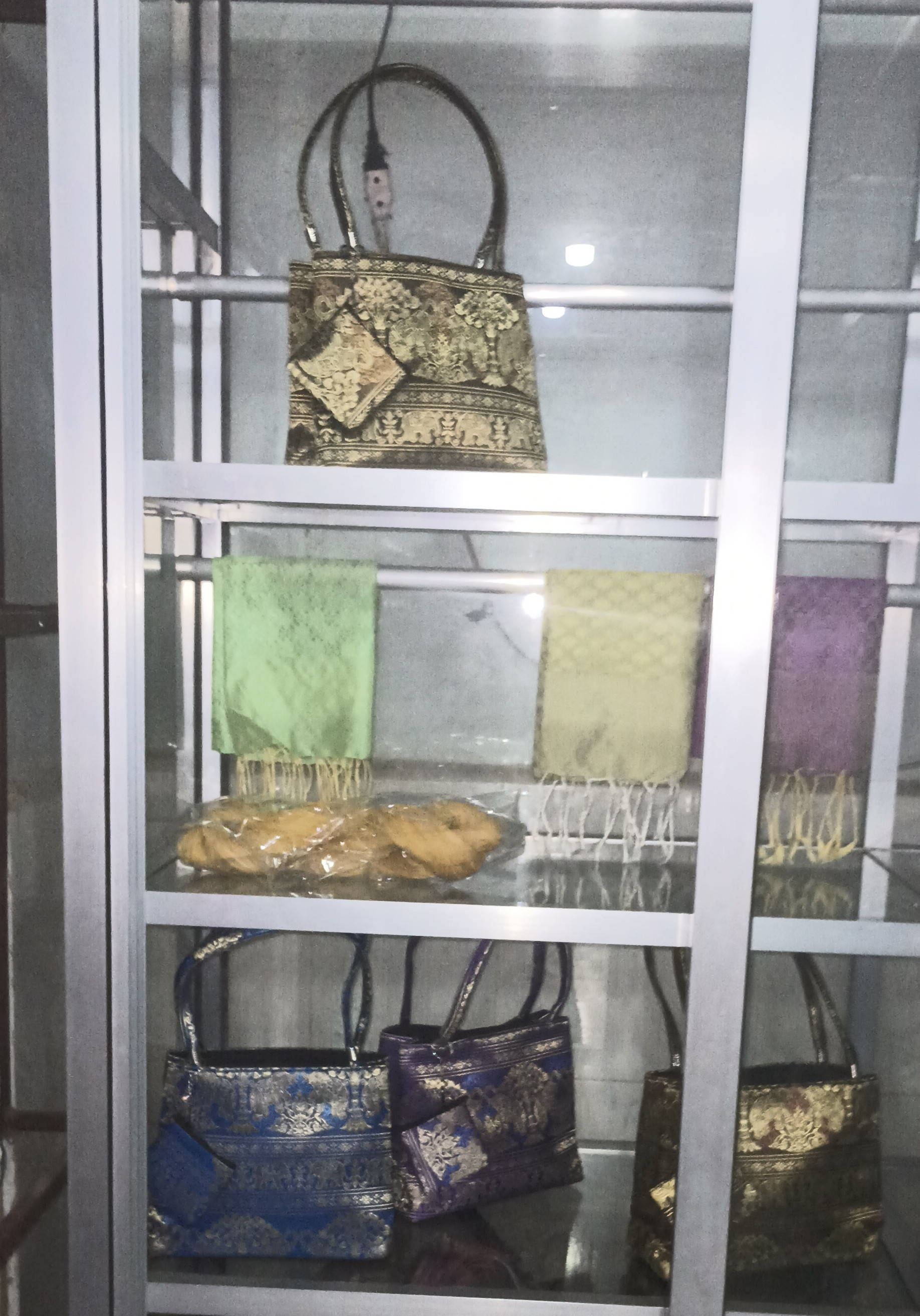
Khmer phamuong silk scarves and charobab silk bags on Koh Dach.

Phamuong សំពត់ផាមួង /pʰaa muəŋ/ are single-colored, weft-faced twill (or taffeta) silks that may utilize contrasting warp and weft colors for a shimmering look, or "shot silk." Woven in plain groundweave, the phamuong is typically unpatterned and hand-produced using a two-framed traditional loom. The etymology of the word comes from Thai in which pha originally means 'skirt' and muong originally refers to the color purple. There are currently 52 colors used in phamuong.

=== Chorabap ===
The chorabap (or sarabap) is a luxurious brocaded silk with metallic silver and gold thread featuring pattern and motifs, such as jasmine floral, in colors different than the actual fabric. Chorabap uses up to 22 needles to create. The term comes from the Persian phrase "zara baftp" which describes "cloth woven with gold thread."

=== Cotton ===
Cotton textiles have also played a significant role in Cambodian culture. Though today Cambodia imports most of its cotton, traditionally woven cotton remains popular. Rural women often weave homemade cotton fabric, which is used in garments and for household purposes. Krama, the traditional check scarves worn almost universally by Cambodians, are made of cotton.

== Non-textile weaving ==
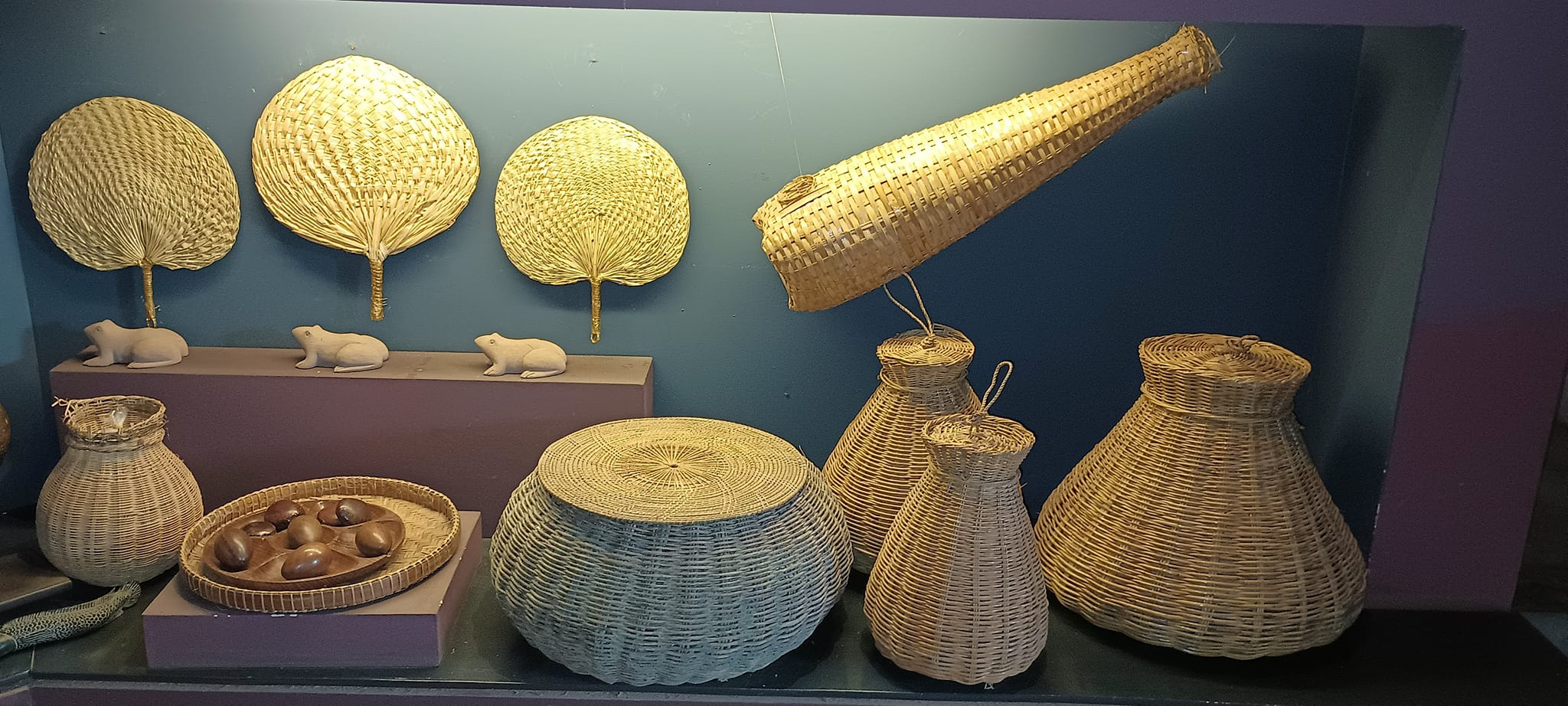
Woven baskets and fans on display

Many Cambodian farmers weave baskets (Khmer: tbanh kantrak) for household use or as a supplemental source of income. Most baskets are made of thinly cut bamboo. Regions known for basketry include Siem Reap and Kampong Cham. Mat weaving (tbanh kantuel) is a common seasonal occupation. They are most commonly made from reeds, either left a natural tan color or dyed in deep jewel tones. The region of Cambodia best known for mat weaving is the Mekong floodplain, especially around Lvea Em district. Mats are commonly laid out for guests and are important building materials for homes. Wicker and rattan crafts (tbanh kanchoeu) made from dryandra trees are also significant. Common wicker and rattan products include walls, mats, furniture, and other household items.

== Lacquerware ==
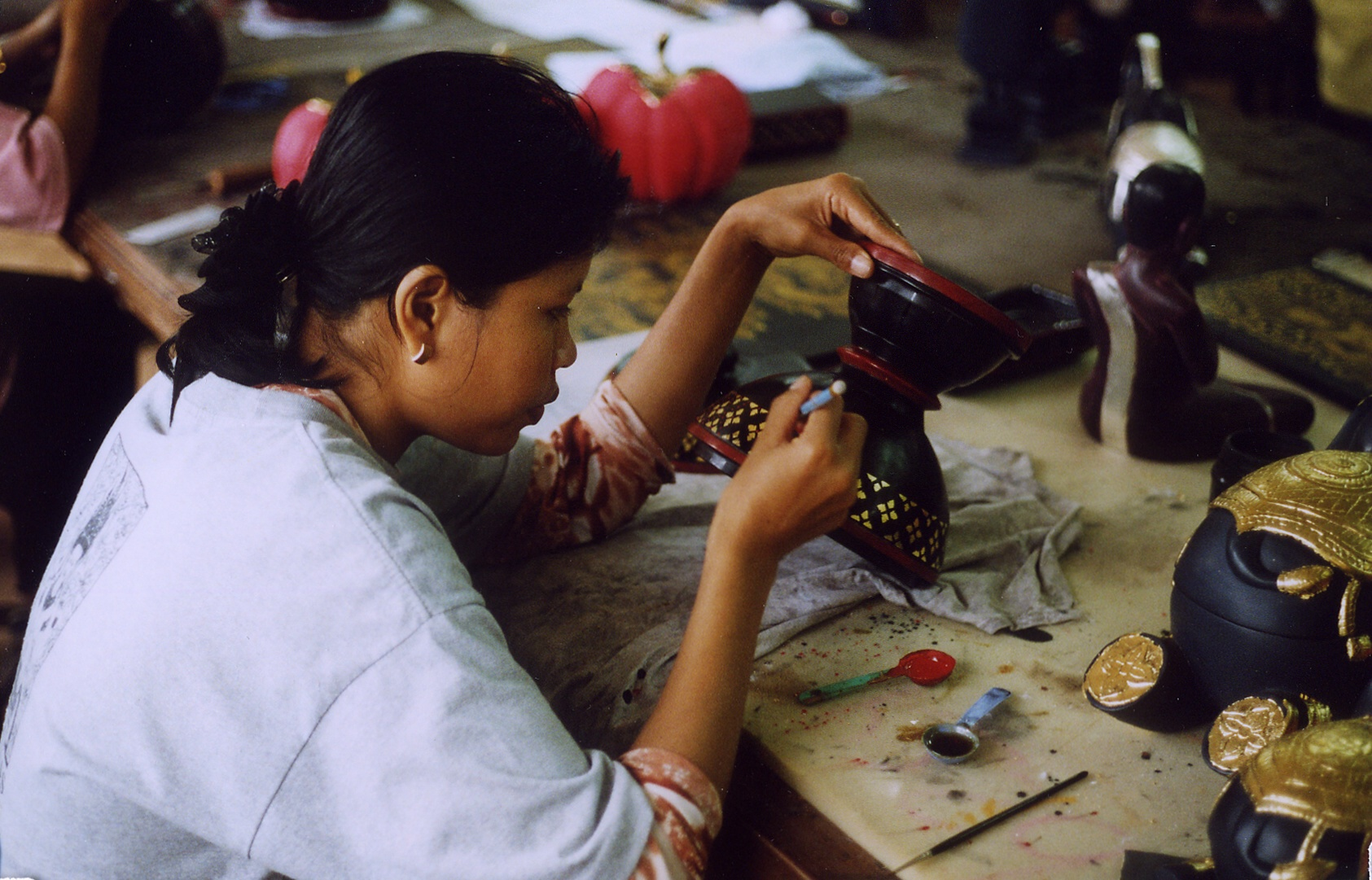
A Cambodian woman works on a lacquered vase

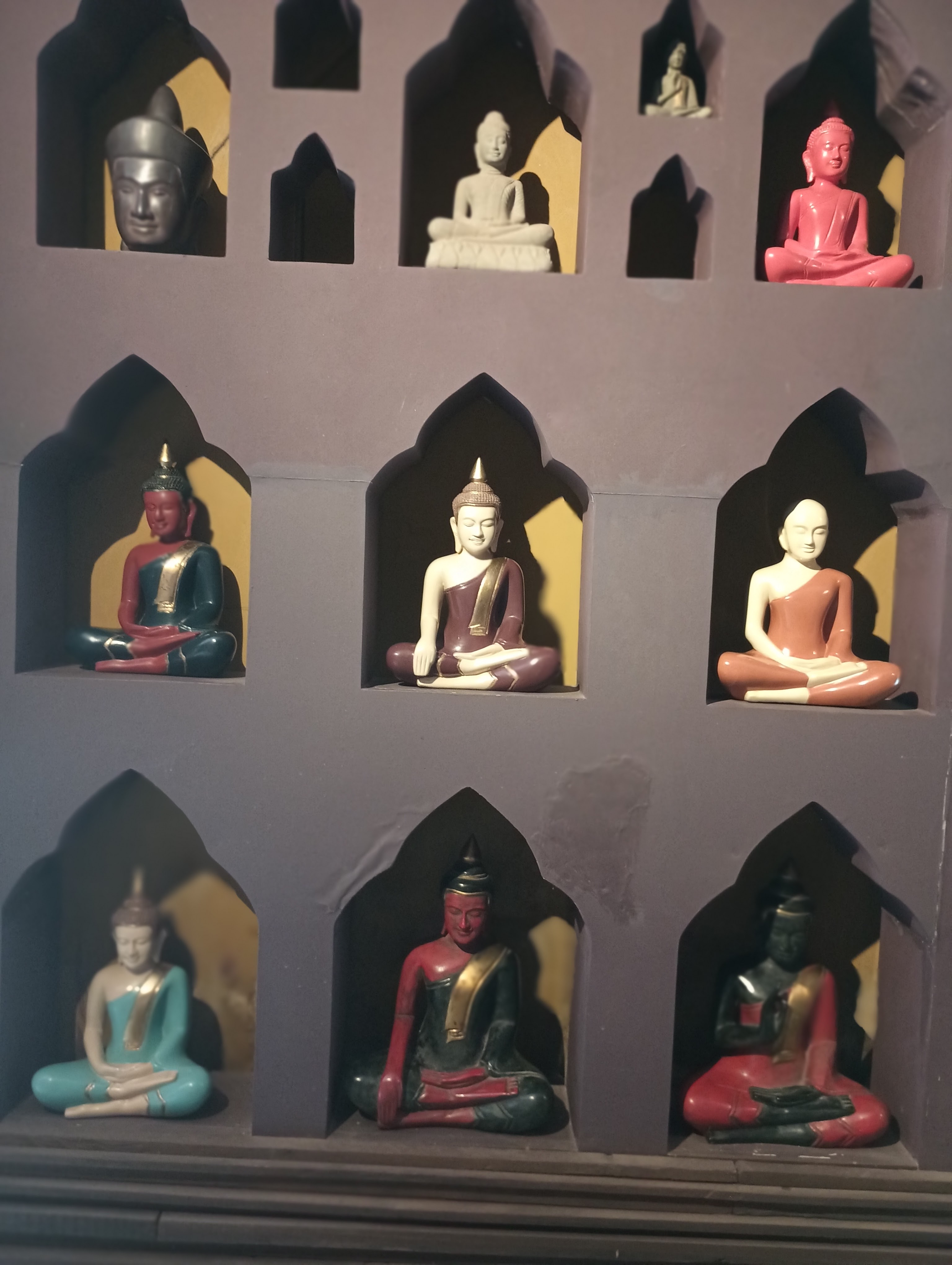
Khmer lacquered Buddhas on display.

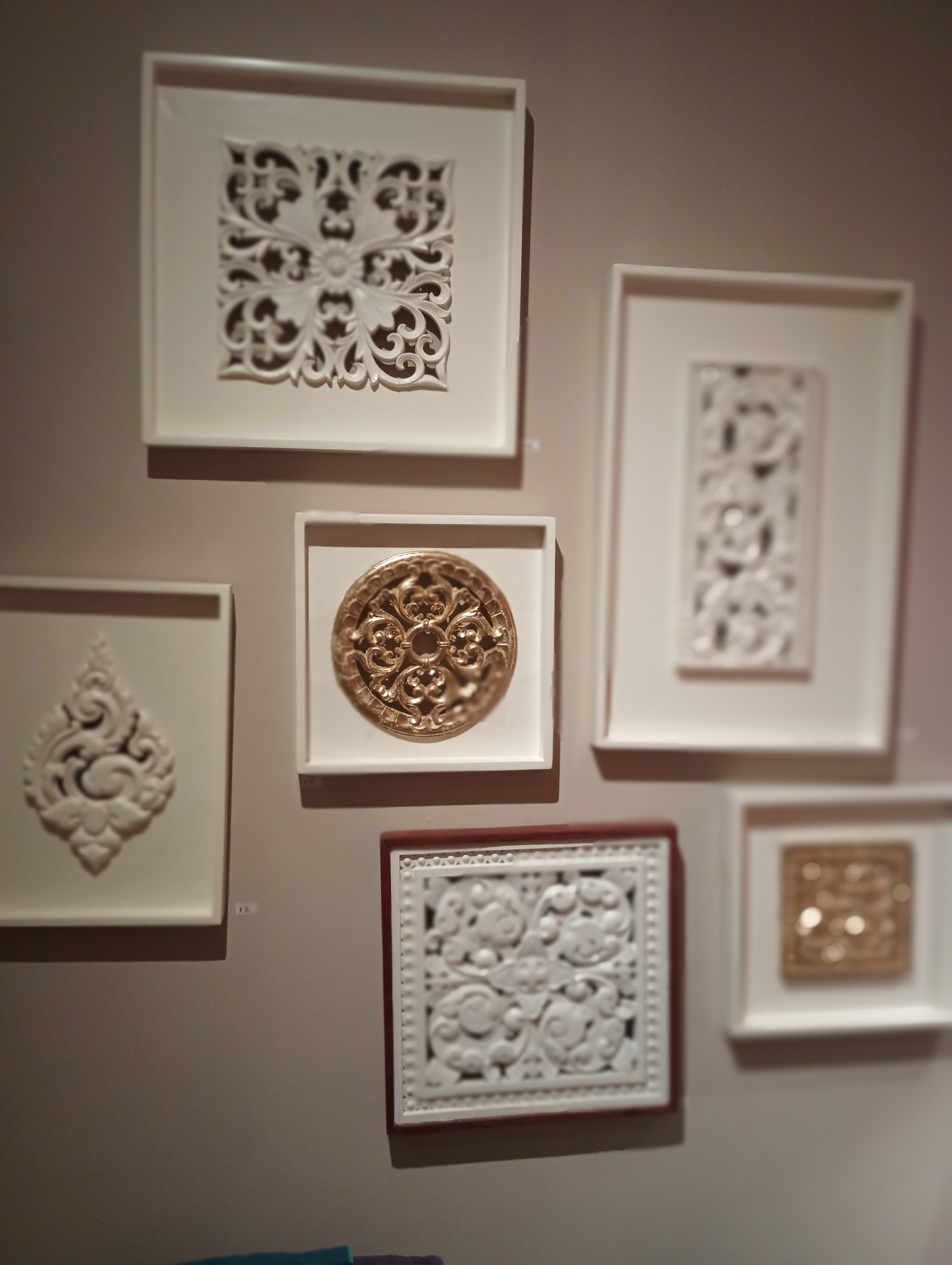
Khmer lacquered panels bearing kbach on display

In Cambodia, the earliest mention of lacquer (or chor mreak, or mreak, ម្រ័ក្ស in Khmer) is an inscription from the 10th century. King Jayavarman V (AD 968-1001) founded a "royal corporation" of kmuk (burnt leaves combined with lacquer) for use in a religious hall under the watch of a "chief of khmuk" and supported by the local economic income.

The height of Cambodian traditional lacquerware (khmuk mreak khmer in Khmer) was between the 12th and 16th centuries; some examples of work from this era, including gilded Buddha images and betel boxes, have survived to the present day. Lacquerware was traditionally colored black using burnt wood, representing the underworld; red using mercury, representing the earth; and yellow using arsenic, representing the heavens. Lacquer on Angkorian stone dates to the 15th or 16th century, though lacquer from what’s believed to be the 12th century is still detectable on the King Suryavarman II bas relief at Angkor Wat.

The art of lacquerware in Cambodia had nearly faded into oblivion; few lacquer trees survived, and lacquer was unavailable in local markets as late as 1998. Those circumstances changed as new resin tree plantations have since been developed.

Lacquer is collected between February and May from the dam kroeul (Melanorrhea laccifera) tree, which grows especially in Kratie and Kampong Thom provinces. There are three main ways Khmer lacquer is used: for pumice painting, for the protection of objects (called leap khmuk mreak), and for decoration. Decorative lacquer, or khmuk mreak leap lum in Khmer, is the most expensive and is combined with pheh, or ash, from sugar palm leaves (sleuk thnaut) or rice straw (cham boeung). Khmers use this decorative lacquer on ceremonial holy religious items, music instruments, crowns/headdresses and masks, and for furniture .

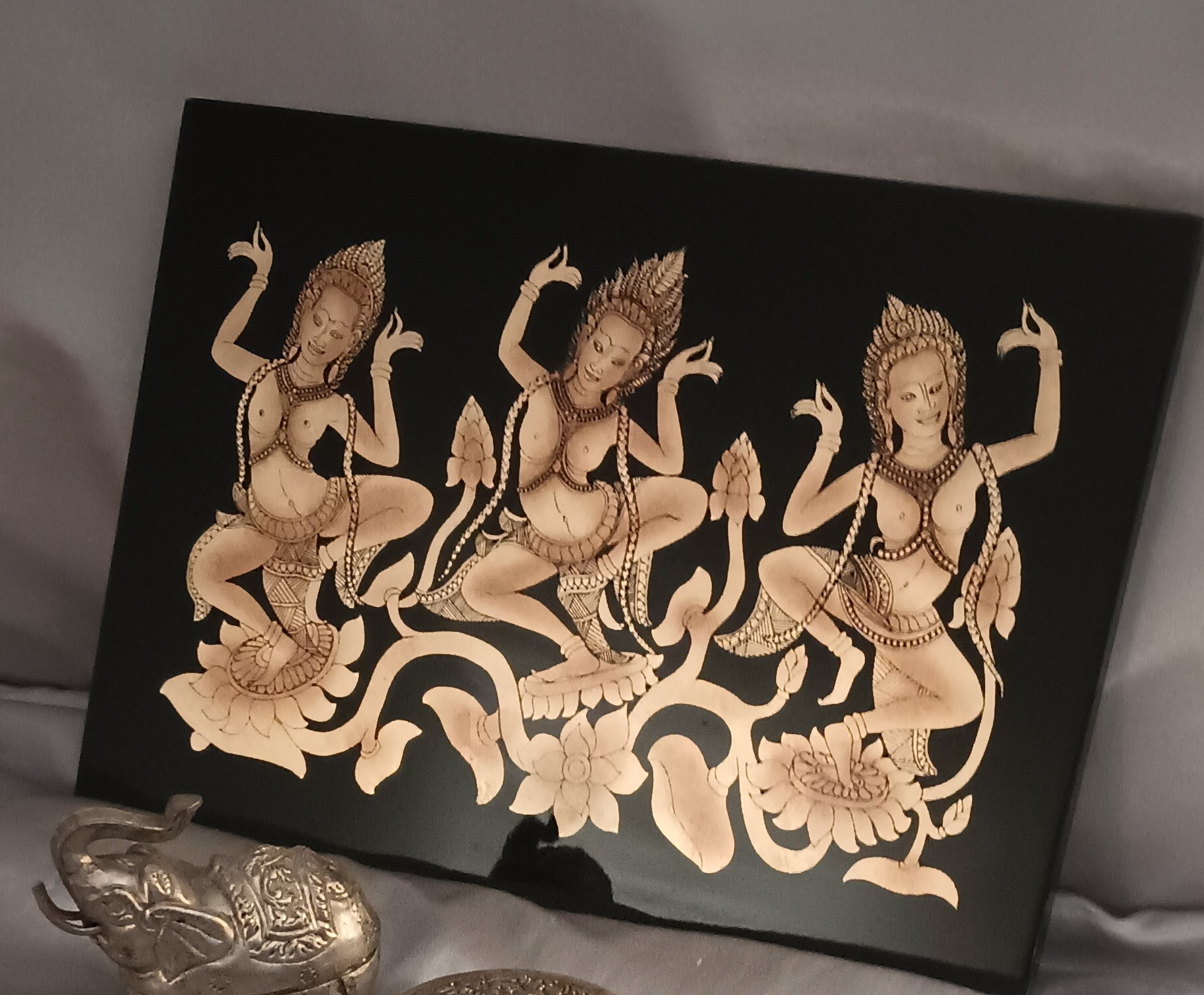
Fine Khmer art: black lacquered panel featuring gold leaf Khmer apsaras, Artisans Angkor.

The non-profit Community First uncovered a 1990’s documentary from the Bophana Center where the Moi perform Chak Mreak, a dance showcasing the lacquer process, at Sambor Prei Kuk.

Though having largely declined, the villages of Pralay and Trea's (Kampong Thom Province) traditional practice of lacquering betel boxes, bowls (for Buddhist monks and water), temple pillars, religious texts, and dance masks for Khol and monkey characters continues. Called muk khmuk in Khmer, lacquer, paper mache, gold leaf, and enamel paint are used for lacquer mask-making.

A lacquer training program for Cambodian children of Kandal province's Svay Andet pagoda was up-started in 2023 by the Ministry of Culture and Fine Arts. Lakhon Khol Wat Svay Andet was added to the UNESCO List of Intangible Cultural Heritage in Need of Urgent Safeguarding in 2018. Creating and restoring lacquer masks for Cambodian masked theater (Khol) will provide an income for the artists while preserving the ancient Lakhon Khol.

Lacquer artisan brothers Eric and Thierry Stocker have maintained workshops in Siem Reap since 2008. First Angkor Artwork and now Stocker Studio, Cambodian artists are trained in gold and polychromy in addition to all-natural lacquerware. The brothers held some 100 resin trees in Kampong Thom in 2018. A team from Stocker Studio treated a Pre Rup Buddha statue with gasoline mixed with lacquer in 2020.

Designer and artist Lim Muy Theam teaches lacquer in his workshop on the grounds of his house turned-gallery.

== Blacksmithing ==
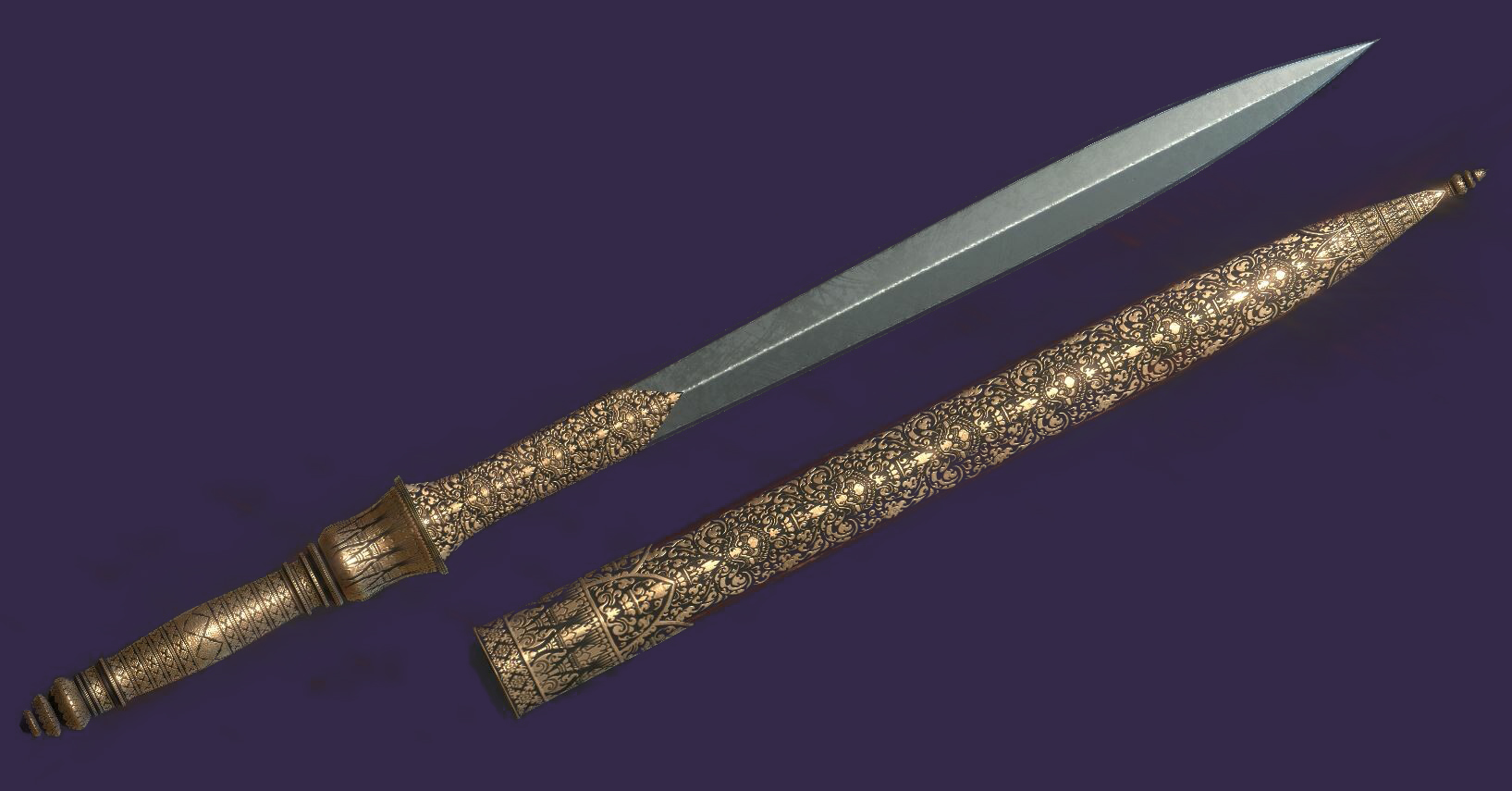
A Khmer-style royal sword (preah khan).

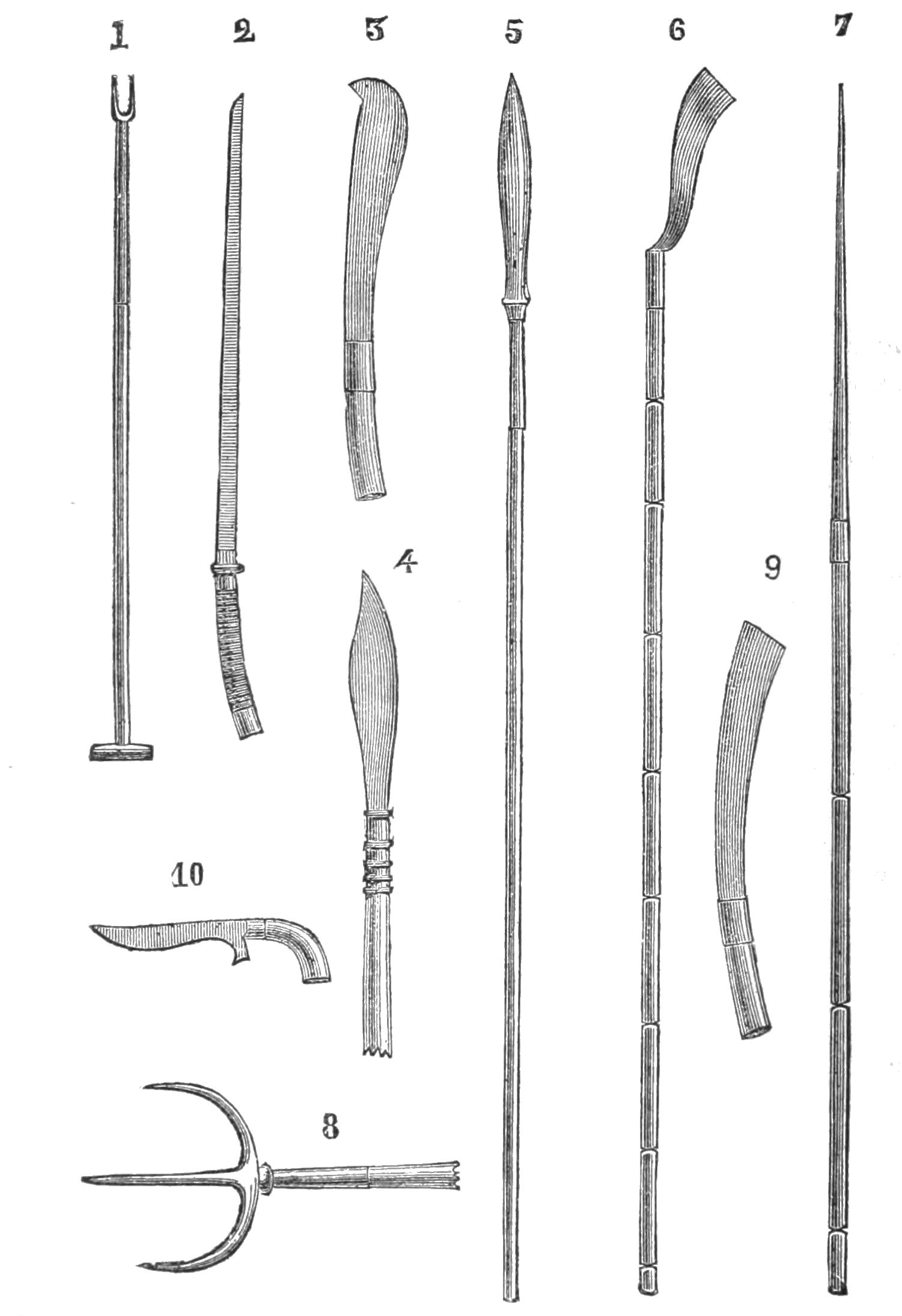
Khmer weapons, as recorded in 1880, and still common among Khmer peasants to this day.

Archeological finds near Angkorian sites in the former Khmer empire have suggested a wide variety and quality of blacksmithing. Khmer swords became part of Khmer culture and literature through influences that were not only mythogical, as the Chandrahas sword represented in Angkor Wat and found in the Reamker or legendary as the sword that Preah Bath Ponhea Yath, who was the last king of the Angkorian Empire, drew out as he led a victorious battle against the Siamese invaders to take back the ancient Khmer capital in the 14th century.

Blacksmithing in Cambodia is essentially linked to the needs of agriculture, and for that reasons, it remains one of the skills which survived best through the tragic years of the Khmer Rouges. In this day, the vast majority of blacksmiths in Cambodia draws from the Cham minority. Recently, high-end quality blacksmithing has also emerged in Cambodia producing knives and swords in Khmer and Japanese styles.

== Silversmithing ==
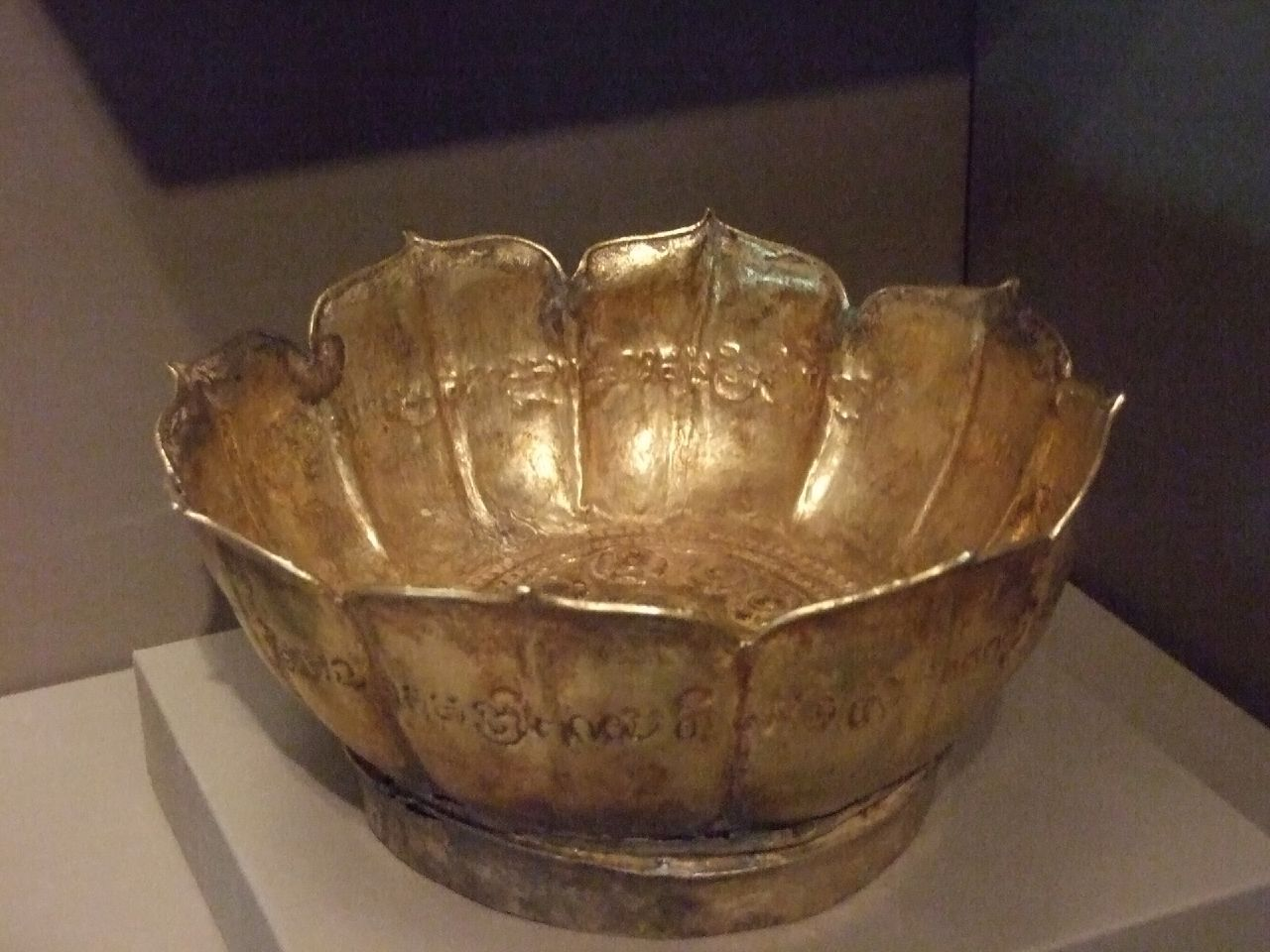
A lotus-shaped Cambodian bowl (gold and silver alloy), made c. 1222 CE

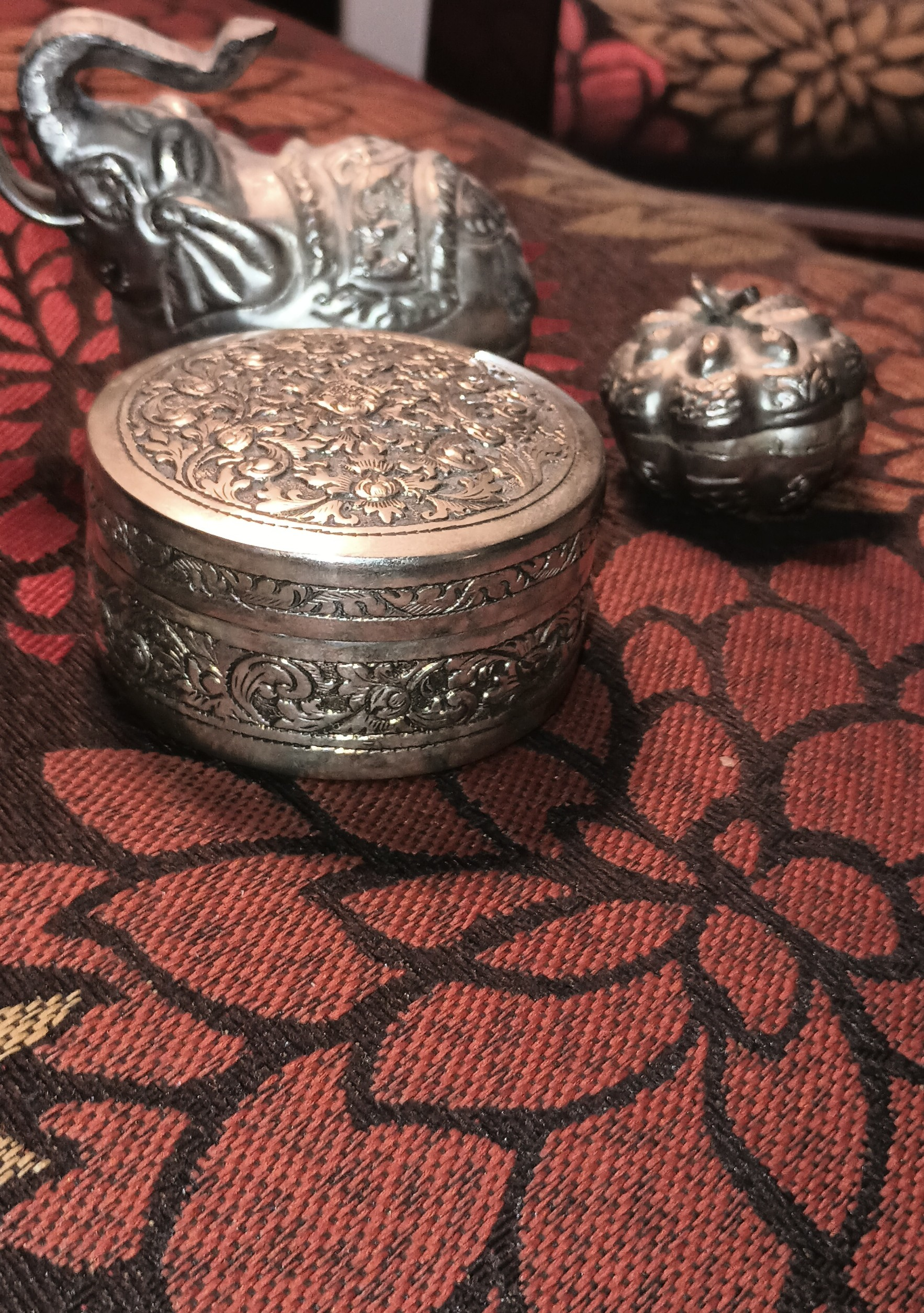
Intricate Khmer silver: round betel box with intricate pattern, or kbach, and silver elephant and pumpkin betel boxes.

Silversmithing in Cambodia dates back centuries. Archaeological excavations at Prey Veng and Banteay Meanchey Province uncovered ancient jewelry, including multiple silver items. Prohear, the archaeological site in Prey Veng, revealed silver jewelry from about 200 years B.C.

Sixth century Buddhist monk Nagasena tells that people of Funan (1st-9th century) "make rings and bracelets of gold and vessels of silver." About 700 years later, Zhou Daguan’s account of a 13th century procession at Angkor describes palace women emerging with “gilt and silver vessels from the palace” on top of many more “ornaments” of “special design,” the use of which he expressed were unknown to him.

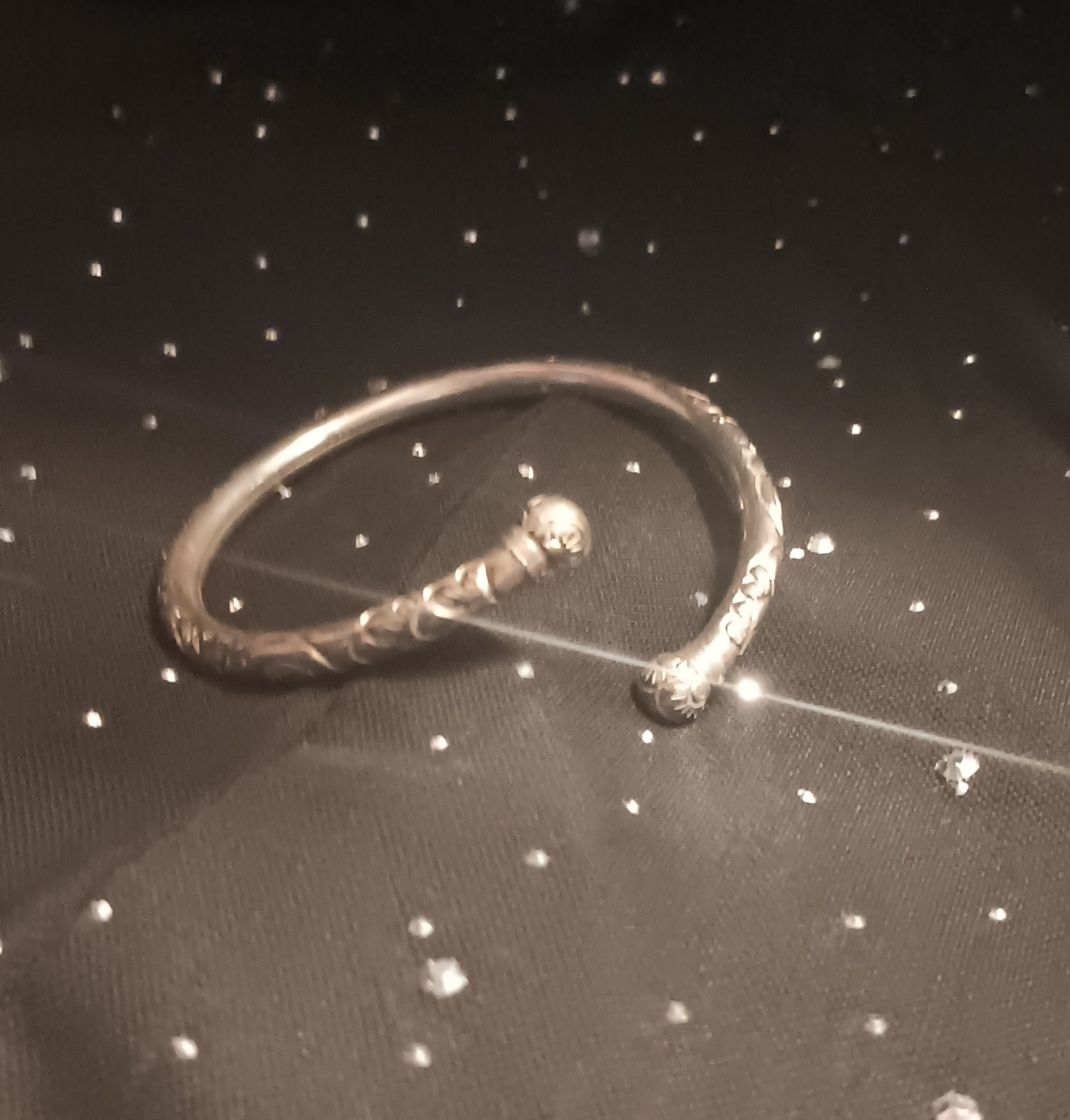
Khmer jeweler's delicate patterned (or kbach) silver bracelet/armlet (2022).

During Cambodia’s Middle Period, Khmer gold and silversmiths from the southern part of Cambodia moved into Siam’s (Thailand) present-day Surin province and established a jewelry-making industry. Their descendants migrated to Ban Chok in Khwao Sinrin District which today remains the center for Pragueam (silver beads made using a distinct, centuries-old technique) and Takao (silver earrings) production in Thailand.

A 19th century English traveler to Cambodia named Thomas Wallace Cox described “a silver cup” and a “silver box” shaped like a fish, holding a fragrant ointment used by “noblemen” for their nostrils and lips.

The Royal Palace traditionally patronized silversmiths' workshops where a variety of items were fashioned, including weaponry, coins, ceremonial objects used in funerary and religious rituals, and betel boxes. Silversmiths remain concentrated at Kompong Luong, near the former royal capital Oudong, even today.

During Cambodia's colonial period, artisans at the School of Fine Art produced celebrated silverwork, and by the late 1930s there were more than 600 silversmiths. Today, silver work is popular for boxes, jewelry, and souvenir items; these are often adorned with fruit, fire, and Angkor-inspired motifs. Men produce most of the forms for such work, but women often complete the intricate filigree.

Silver betel nut boxes are considered high quality. The hip sla (“areca nut box") holds up to five smaller boxes containing the nut cutter, mortar, lime paste, and the bundled ingredients for chewing. Animal and fruit shapes are the most common, and all bear intricately designed foliage patterns, or kbach.

Belly-chains, bracelets, and bangles of silver adorn the bodies of Khmers even today.

== Ceramics ==
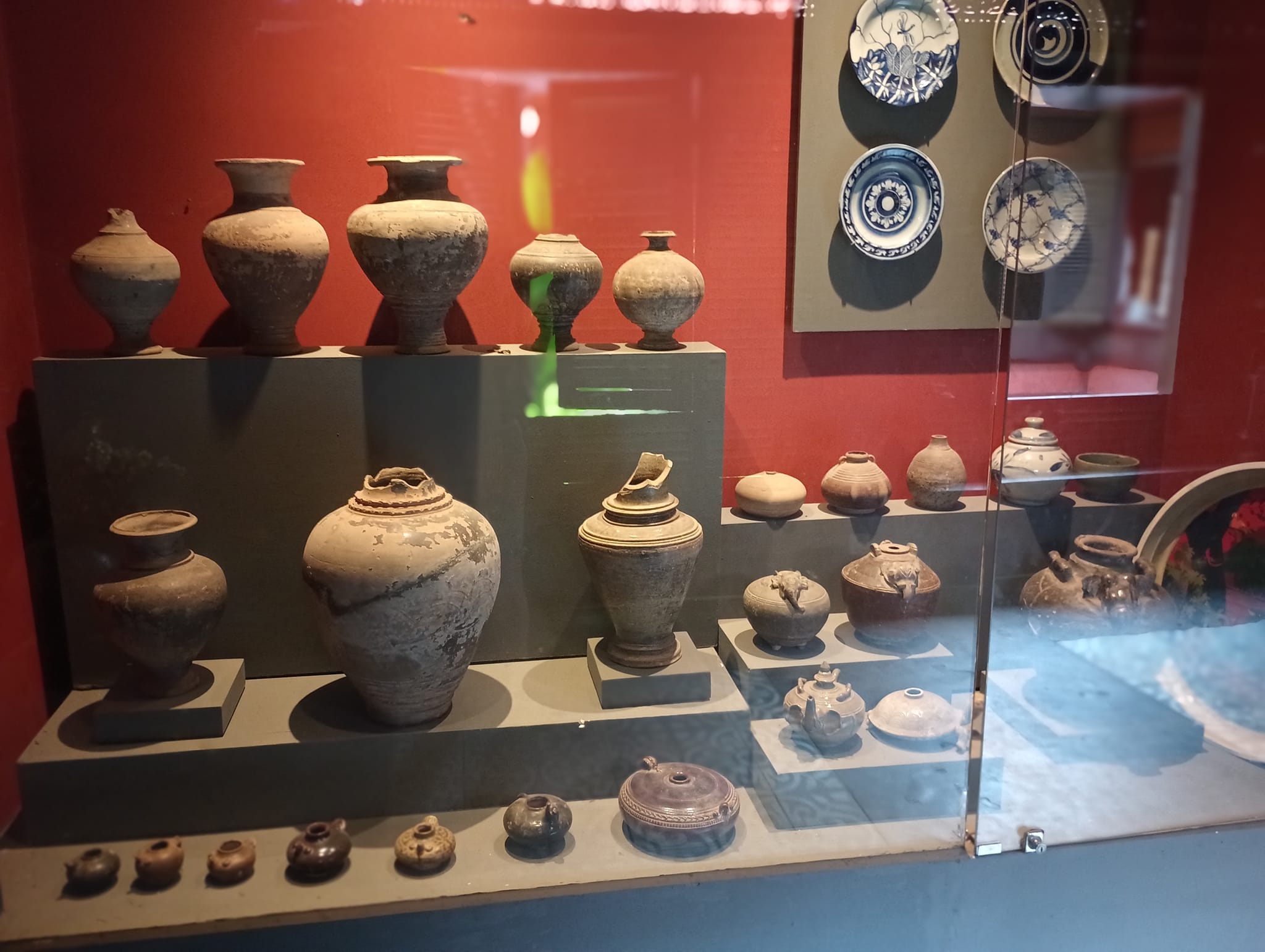
Ancient & modern Khmer ceramics/pottery displayed on shelves & wall.

Cambodian pottery traditions date to 5000 BCE. Ceramics were mostly used for domestic purposes such as holding food and water. There is no evidence that Khmer ceramics were ever exported, though ceramics were imported from elsewhere in Asia beginning in the 10th century. Ceramics in the shape of birds, elephants, rabbits, and other animals were popular between the 11th and 13th centuries.

Potting traditionally was done either on a pottery wheel or using shaping tools such as paddles and anvils. Firing was done in clay kilns, which could reach temperatures of 1,000–1,200 °C, or in the open air, at temperatures of around 700 °C. Primarily green and brown glazes were used. In rural Cambodia, traditional pottery methods remained. Many pieces are hand-turned and fired on an open fire without glaze. The country's major center for pottery is Kompong Chhnang Province.

In modern Cambodia, the art of glazed ceramics faded into oblivion: the technique of stoneware stop to be used around 14th century, at the end of Angkor era. Today this technique begin a slow revival through a Belgian ceramist who founded the Khmer Ceramics & Fine Arts Center, in Siem Reap, the organization lead vocational training and researches about this lost skill.

Glazed pottery with brown slip; Bayon period, 12th century

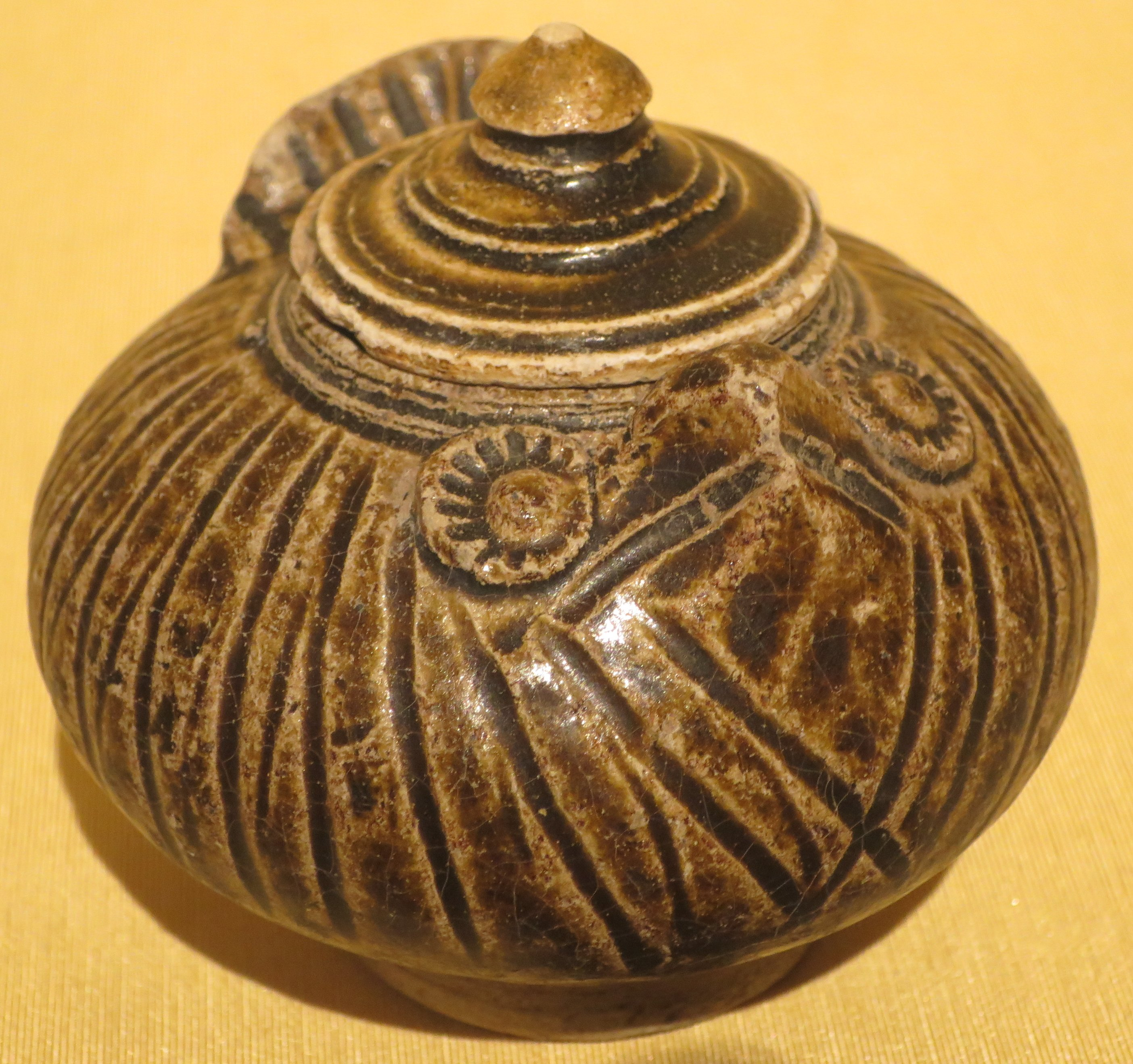
An owl-shaped lime pot; Angkorian era, 12th-13th century

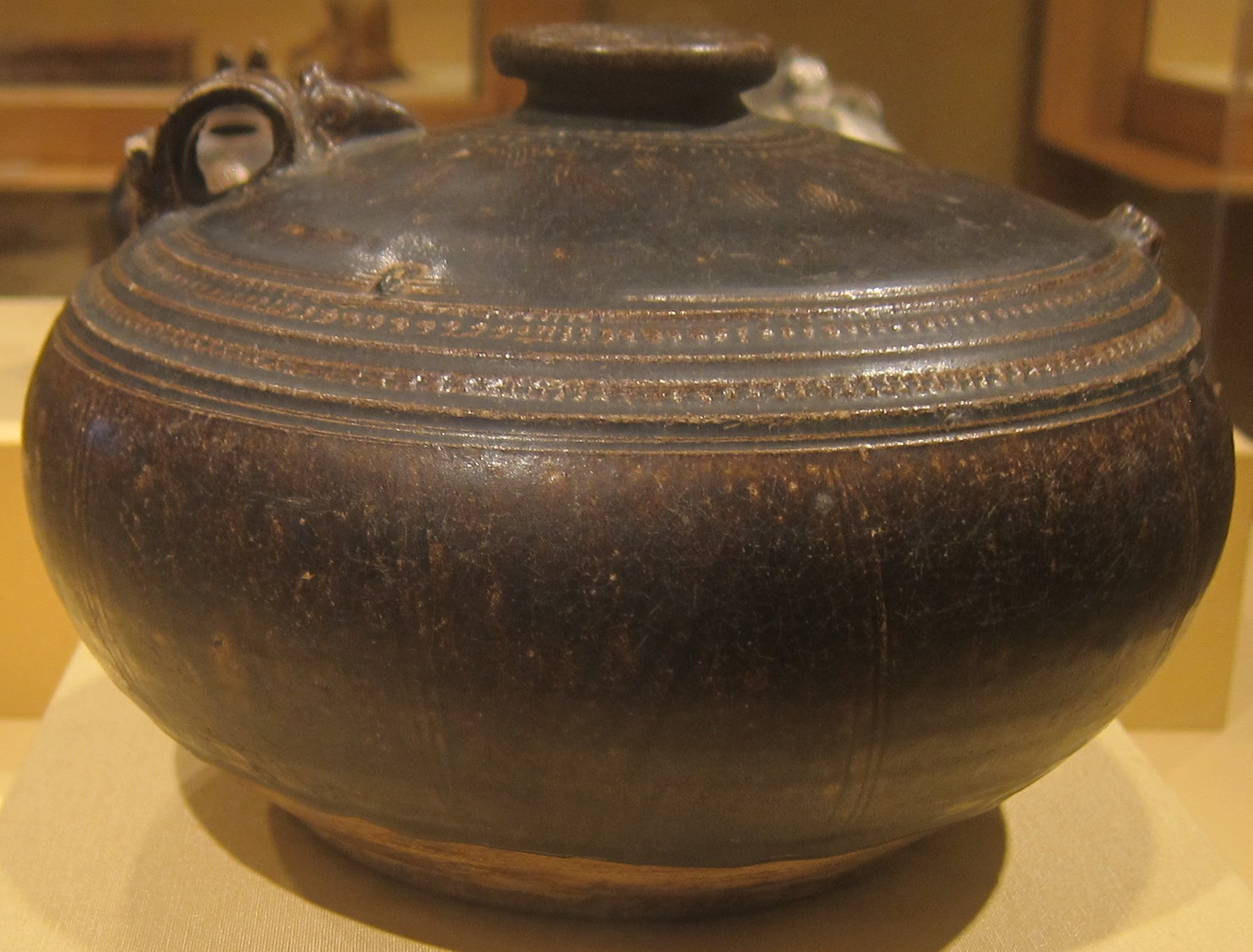
Ewer glazed stoneware; Angkorian era, 12th century

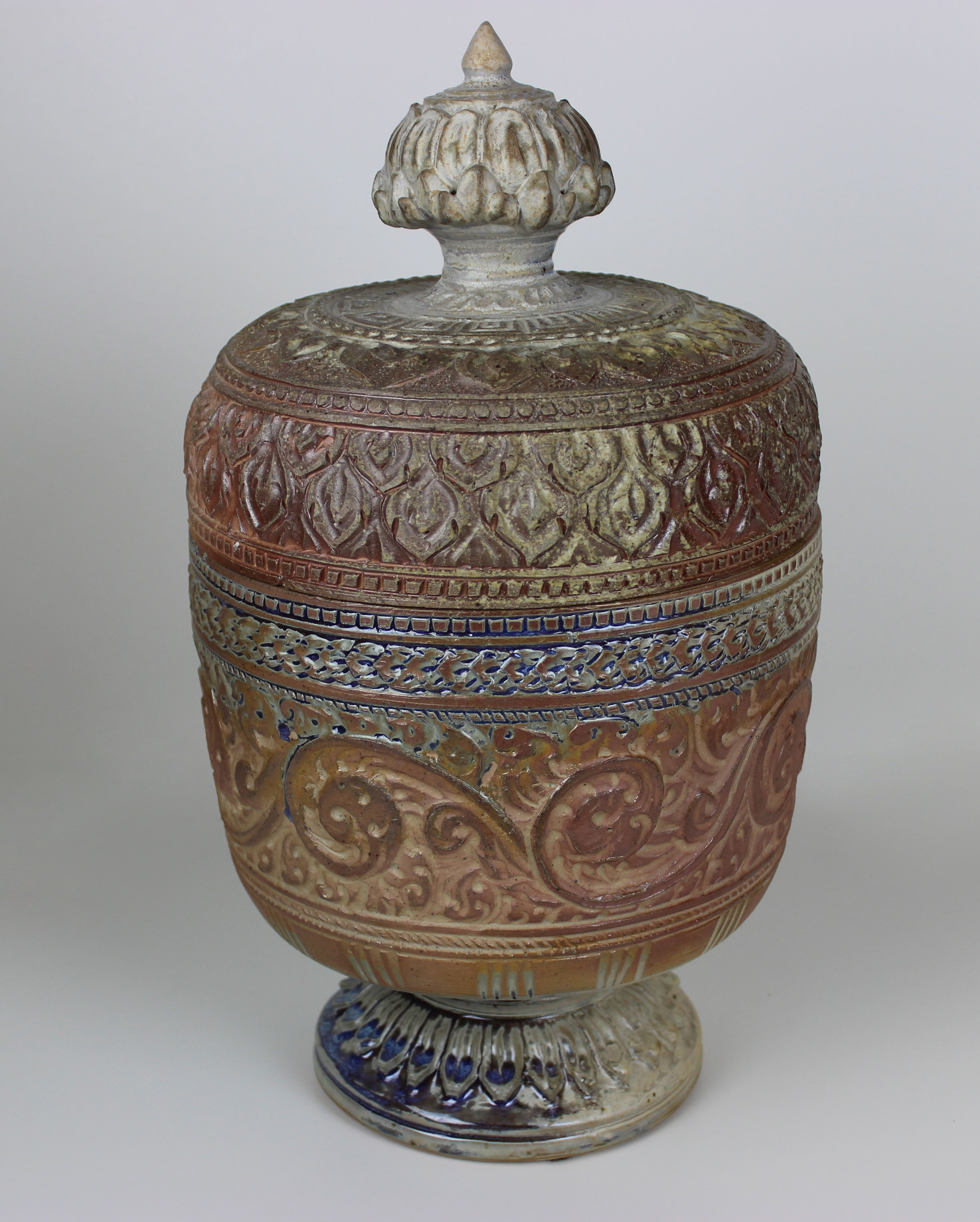
A water jar, used as a container for water or food, Angkorian era

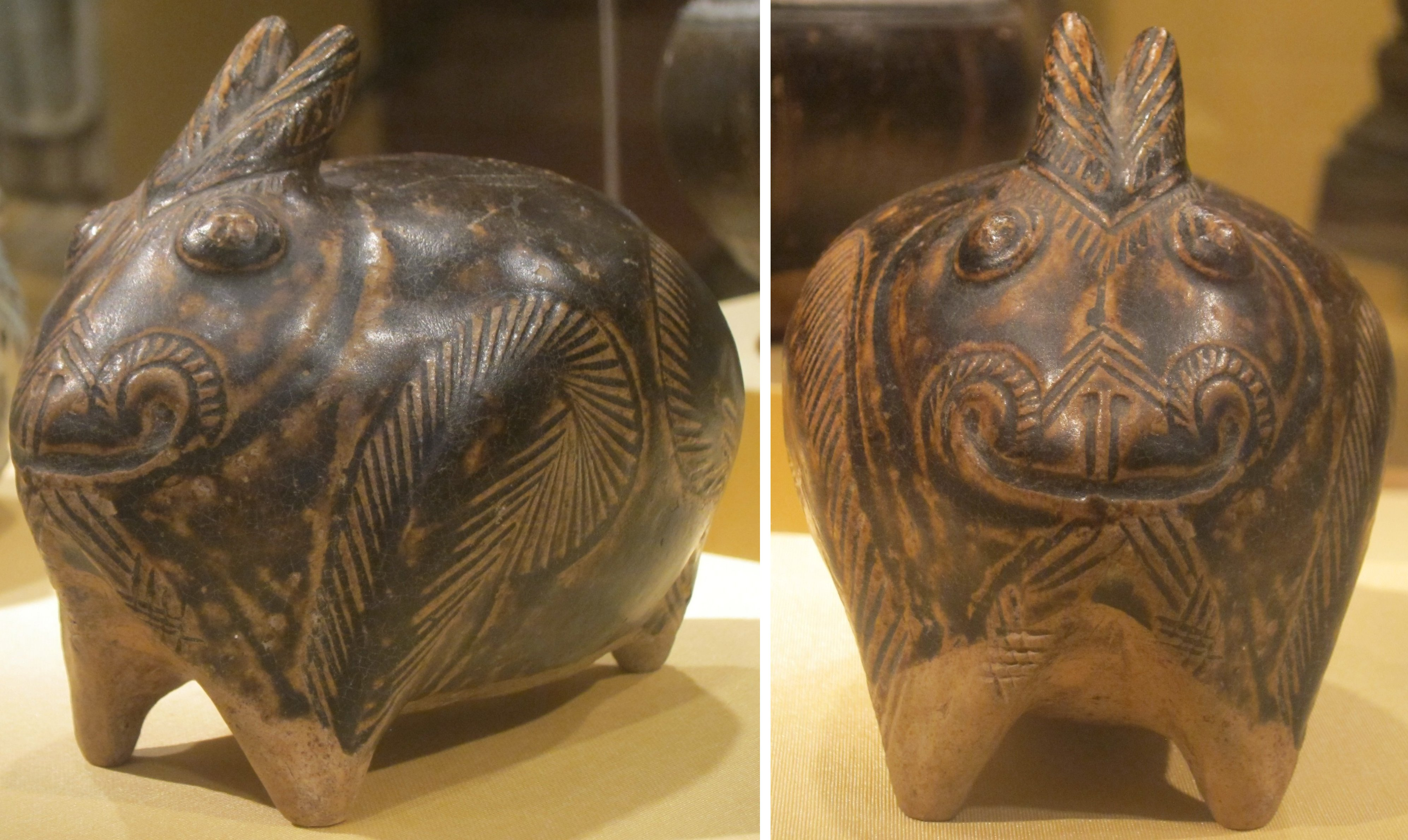
Rabbit shaped glazed stoneware; Angkorian era, 11th-12th century

== Kites ==
Cambodia's kite-making and kite-flying tradition, which dates back many centuries, was revived in the early 1990s and is now extremely popular throughout the country. Kites (Khmer: khleng ek) are generally flown at night during the northeast monsoon season. A bow attached to the kites resonates in the wind, producing a musical sound.

== Modern and contemporary visual arts ==
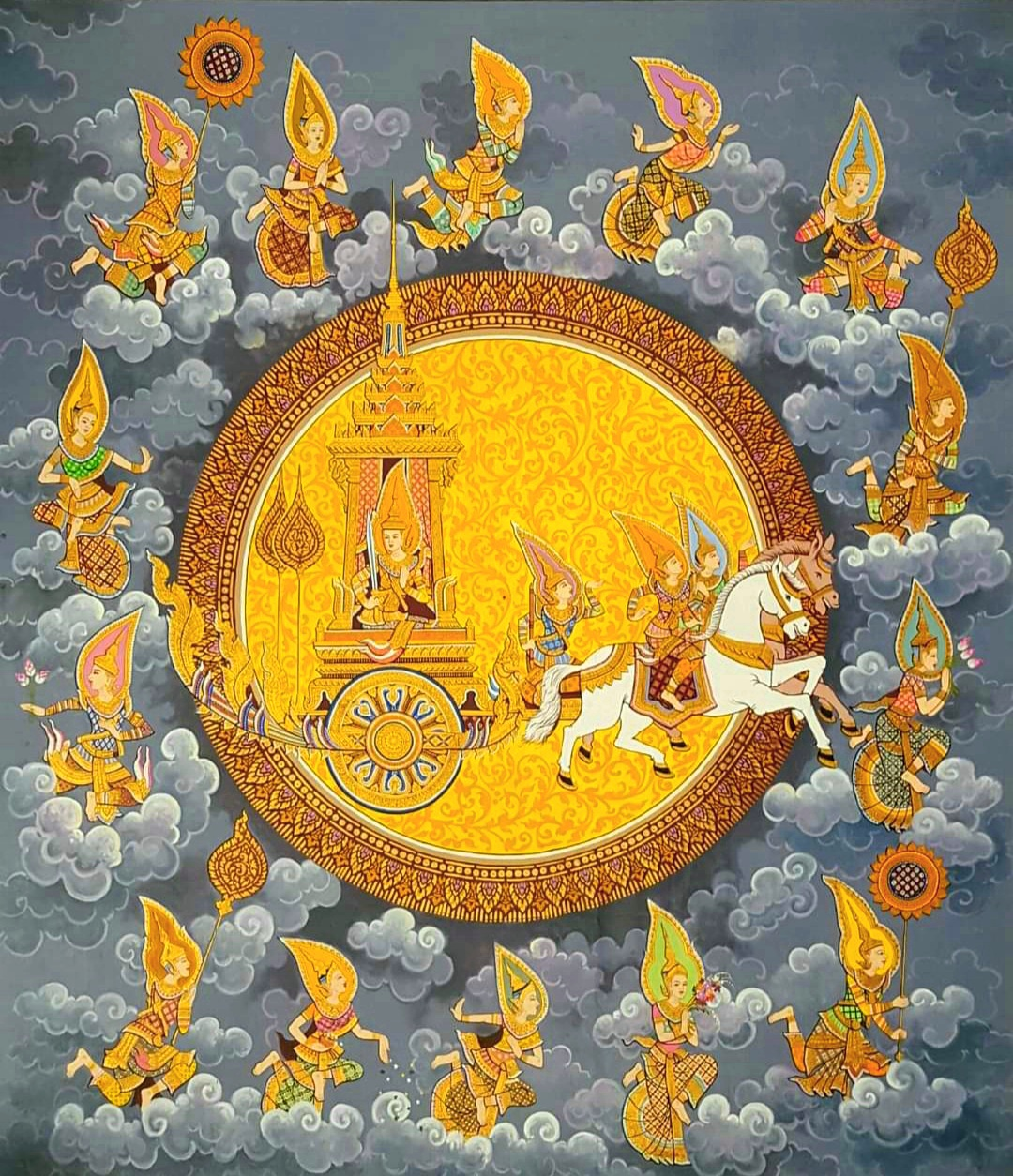
Surya riding his chariot, Khmer knit picture

Cambodia's tradition of modern (representational) drawing, painting, and sculpture was established in the late 1940s at the School of Cambodian Arts (later called the University of Fine Arts), where it occupied much of the school's curriculum a decade later. These developments were supported by the government, which encouraged new areas of specialization (e.g. design and modern painting) at the school and purchased modern art for the Prime Minister's residences and for government buildings.

Galleries opened in Phnom Penh during the 1960s, and cultural centers hosted exhibitions of modern paintings and provided art libraries. One important painter of the 1960s was Nhek Dim; he has become the painter of reference for modern painters. During the subsequent Khmer Rouge era, many artists were killed and art production nearly ceased.

After the fall of the Khmer Rouge, artists and professors returned the University of Fine Arts to rebuild arts training. Socialist Bloc governments sponsored the education of young art students in Poland, Bulgaria, the former Soviet Union, and Hungary during the late 1980s and early 1990s. Other local efforts aimed to re-establish workshops, collect documents, and preserve traditional knowledge.

Though several galleries present changing exhibitions in Phnom Penh, the vast majority of artists cannot support themselves through exhibitions and sales of modern work. Artists generally earn income from Angkor-inspired art for tourists or from painting commercial signs and large reproductions that in the West would be mechanically produced.

Several broad schools of art exist among modern Cambodian artists. Some artists, including Som Samai (a silversmith), An Sok (a mask-maker), and Chet Chan (a painter) follow colonial traditions to produce traditional Khmer art. Chhim Sothy's work is also derived from these traditions. Many young artists who studied abroad in the 1980s, including Phy Chan Than, Soeung Vannara, Long Sophea, and Prom Sam An, have presented a modern Khmer art forms combining subjects from Khmer art with Western modernism. Other notable Cambodian artists include Leang Seckon, Pich Sopheap, Svay Ken, Asasax, Chhan Dina, Patrick Samnang Mey, Lam Soeung, and Chhorn Bun Son. During the 1990s, Cambodia saw the return of many members of the Khmer diaspora, including several internationally recognized artists. Among these are Marine Ky and Chath Piersath.

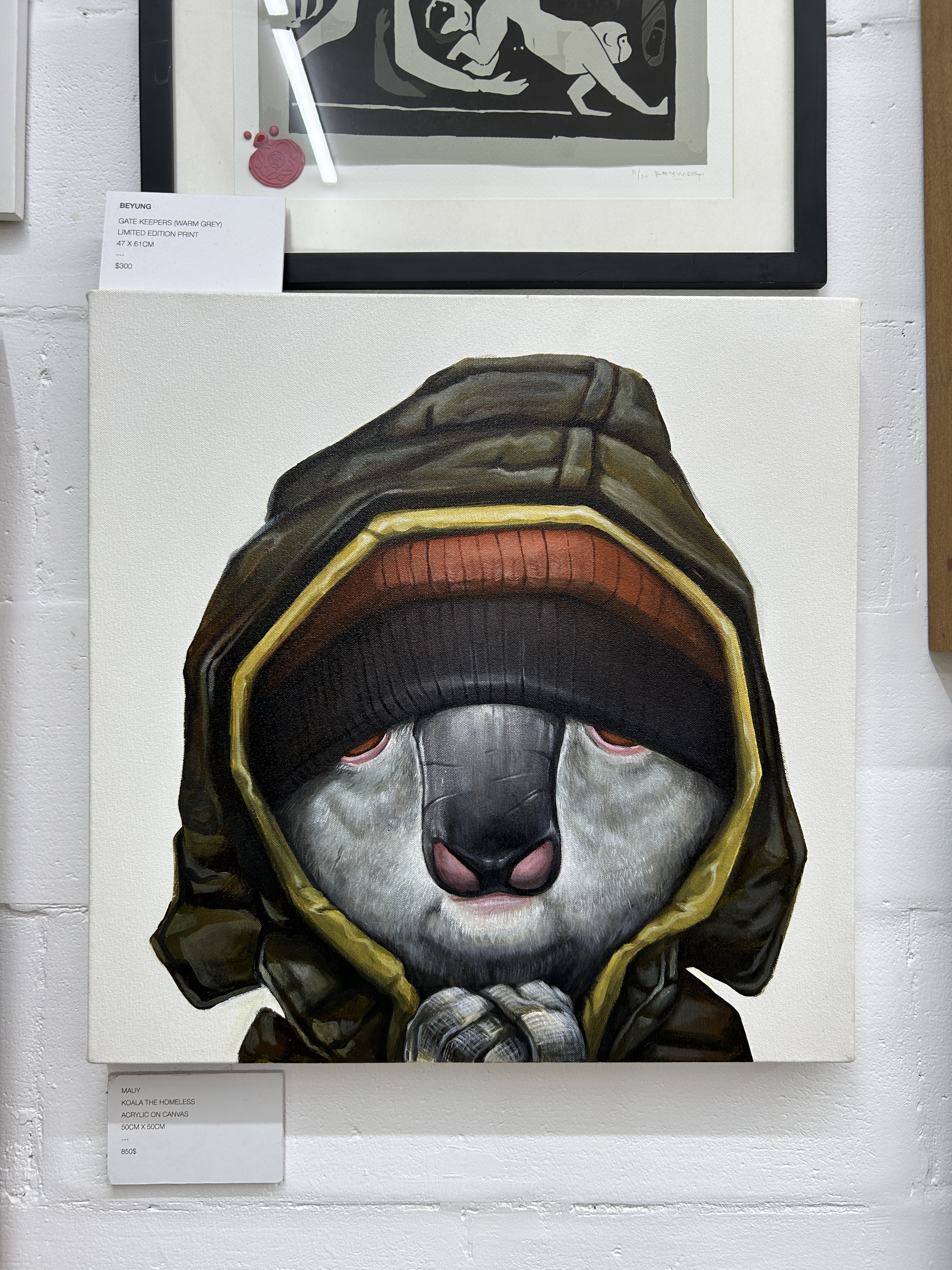
A 50cm x 50cm acrylic on canvas created by FONKi showcasing a Koala, with the title called "Koala The Homeless".

Contemporary artists like FONKi have also revived street art including graffiti in Cambodia. FONKi, born in Paris to Khmer refugee parents and who grew up in Montreal, is a part of diaspora artists who have moved back to Cambodia to develop the local arts scene. His work can be seen in Phnom Penh at artists workspace FACTORY! and he also founded FT Gallery where Cambodian and international artists are able to display and sell their works. They have also commissioned other artists from countries like Nepal to create custom murals and graffiti and aim to support new Cambodian talent as well as nurturing Phnom Penh's international reputation as a vibrant cultural hub in South East Asia.

== Works cited ==
- "Cambodia Cultural Profile". Cultural Profiles. September 18, 2005. Archived from the original on 2008-03-10.
