= The Drakkars =

Cambodian band

- The Drakkars from the cover of their 1974 album. From left: Chhattha, Sareth, Sam Ath, Tana.

Background information
- Origin: Phnom Penh, Cambodia
- Genres: Hard rock; Psychedelic rock; traditional folk; R&B; Pop
- Years active: 1961–1975
- Label: Friend
- Past members: Touch Seang Tana; Touch Chhattha; Ouk Sam Ath; Oer Sam Ol; Som Sareth; Tan Phanareth; Mam Molivan

The Drakkars, (Note: Khmer: តន្ត្រី ដ្រាក្ការ, romanized: Tântrei Drakkar) (commonly known as Drakkar, Drakka Band, or Thra Kha Band in some Romanized sources) were a Cambodian hard rock band active from 1961 to 1975. Their music has been noted as an important late-stage development in Cambodian rock of the 1960s and 70s, a thriving music scene that was abruptly crushed by the Khmer Rouge communists in 1975. Some members of the band did not survive the ensuing Cambodian genocide. Surviving members reformed the band and began performing again in 2011.

== Formation ==
The Drakkars formed in 1961 by then 11 year-old Touch Chhattha, and they later performed rock music inspired by The Beatles and The Rolling Stones as well as early Cambodian guitar bands like Baksey Cham Krong and Apsara. As with many of their contemporaries like Sinn Sisamouth, Ros Serey Sothea, and Pen Ran, The Drakkars were influenced by pop records imported from France and Latin America that had become popular among musicians in the capital. Their official band name was adopted shortly after the 1964 film The Long Ships, which was known by its French release in Cambodia as Les Drakkars. The band is formally named “The Drakkars” in English as displayed on their 1974 album. However, in Khmer it is formally named “តន្ត្រី ដ្រាក្ការ”, meaning “Drakka Band”. Despite that, the band is most commonly remembered as Drakkar today.

Between 1961 and 1967, the band consisted of Chhattha's friends and the lineup would constantly evolve. They began by playing genres such as traditional folk, R&B, and pop, and it was not until the late 1960s when they settled on hard rock as their main genre. Around 1964, Chhathha had a chance to meet with Touch Tana and Mam Molivan and the three bonded over their love for Voice of America. The Drakkars’ first public performance—sometime shortly before Cambodian-American diplomatic relations were cut off in May 1965—was for a party at the U.S. Embassy in Phnom Penh. Then in 1967, the band solidified its rock-oriented lineup with singer/rhythm guitarist Touch Seang Tana, singer/lead guitarist Touch Chhathha, singer/bassist Mam Molivan, and singer Tan Phanareth, and several temporary drummers. This first lineup did not record any original music, and the members, all in their teens or early twenties, disbanded and took military or government jobs.

Occasionally, they were joined by Touch Seang Tana's friend, proto-punk singer Yol Aularong. What started as a rivalry later led to the two bonding over their love for rock, resulting in a “frenemy” relationship. Tana reported that Aularong's song “កាហ្វេឆាខ្វែ” [Black Coffee] was inspired by the two's chain-smoking days at coffee shops.

== Reformation and popularity ==
In the summer of 1970, Tana assembled a lineup with lead guitarist Som Sareth, drummer Ouk Sam Ath, and bassist Oer Sam Ol. By this time, the Cambodian music scene had been further influenced by Western rock and roll and soul music via U.S. armed forces radio that had been broadcast to troops stationed nearby during the Vietnam War. The Drakkars toured U.S. military bases in South Vietnam that year, after which original lead guitarist Touch Chhatha rejoined. This version of the band was heavily influenced by the hard rock sounds of bands like Deep Purple and Grand Funk Railroad, and regularly performed covers of songs by those and other bands. Their sound at the time has been compared to Led Zeppelin, Santana, and Jimi Hendrix.

The band's hippie attire and long hair were noted as symbolic of changing times and American influences in early-1970s Cambodia. Guitarists Chhathha and Tana attracted attention, not all of it good, for their unusually aggressive guitar playing, while drummer Ouk Sam Art caused minor scandals by playing shirtless. Tana noted in the documentary film Don't Think I've Forgotten that Cambodia was not yet ready for western-style hard rock at the time, and that only the younger generation appreciated their music.

== Wartime and Khmer Rouge era ==
The Drakkars are credited with re-popularizing Cambodia's first mainstream female pop singer Mao Sareth. According to Tana, by then her fame of the 1950s and early 1960s had faded. Nonetheless, he was keen to reject then-popular singers and instead have his childhood favorites, such as Mao Sareth and Pen Ran, sing with the band. In 1970, Chhattha and Tana composed the song “បើបងមិនមេត្តា” [Have You No Mercy], in which Mao Sareth was given the opportunity to sing. The song was performed live on television and quickly became the Drakkars’ first hit song. It not only catapulted the Drakkars into fame but also re-popularized Sareth. With this newfound popularity the band began performing more at clubs in Phnom Penh and occasionally for the radio during the later stages of the Cambodian Civil War, when the city was under threat from both American bombing campaigns and attacks by Khmer Rouge insurgents. Due to wartime curfews, the band had to play in clubs during the day and often heard nearby gunfire and explosions during their performances.

In mid-1972, Tana met Mol Kagnol of the then-disbanded Baskey Cham Krong. who he would call his mentor. Between 1972 and 1973, the band began recording their first studio album, simply titled “តន្ត្រី ដ្រាក្ការ” or in English “The Drakkars”, in Kagnol's apartment using his eight-track console with guest singers such as Mao Sareth and Pen Ran. The makeshift studio was chosen because Tana was wary of the professional studios such as Van Chann Studio, considered the most premium studio for artists in Cambodia during that time with far better equipment than Kagnol's makeshift studio. Van Chann's wife had been running the studio after his disappearance in 1969 which prompted Tana to be wary since the studio began charging higher fees. He much preferred Kagnol, whom he called a great acoustic and technical audio engineer. Furthermore, avoiding professional production, Tana borrowed US$18,000 from his brother to buy a Hitachi tape copying machine so he could self-produce 1,000 cassette copies of the album. It originally consisted of only nine songs and was released in late 1973. The album tanked, selling a mere 100 copies. Tana, who was severely in debt, moved to Pailin to seek another job.

However, in 1974 his brother, who was diligently recording the album sales, called him to report that the album had taken off and sold out completely. Thus, that same year he had 20,000 cassettes of The Drakkars professionally repressed and released, this time with seven previously unreleased songs added, including two versions of “បើបងមិនមេត្តា“ [Have You No Mercy], one from the 1972-1973 sessions and one being the original live 1970 hit recording (the 1970 version is featured on the Don’t Think I’ve Forgotten Soundtrack). By early 1975, all copies had sold out making it the highest-selling and grossing album in Cambodian history up to that point.

Plans to further promote the album were halted in April 1975, when the Khmer Rouge defeated the Khmer Republic army and gained control of the country. Tana recalls he was in Pailin when the Khmer Rouge took over and he failed in a planned escape to Thailand. The rest of the Drakkars’ members are assumed to be among the two million residents of Phnom Penh who were forced to leave the city and become farm workers to fulfill the Khmer Rouge's visions of agrarian socialism and the eradication of all foreign influences (including music) from Cambodian society. Group members Oer Sam Ol and Som Sareth disappeared during the ensuing Cambodian genocide and their exact fates are unknown. Touch Seang Tana was imprisoned in a work camp, and claims that he survived the genocide by singing Santana songs to Khmer Rouge soldiers on demand while passing himself off as a common peasant. Touch Chhattha was one of many professional musicians who were forced to play patriotic and traditional music for Khmer Rouge troops practically every day.

== Post-Khmer Rouge and reunion ==
Touch Seang Tana performing with the modern version of The Drakkars in 2015.

After the fall of the Khmer Rouge in 1979, drummer Ouk Sam Ath and guitarist Touch Chhattha returned to music work for Cambodia's National Radio station, while Tana became an accomplished manager of fisheries and environmental conservation for the post-Khmer Rouge Cambodian government. Conservation work continued to be a theme in Tana's life. As of 2013 he was the Chairman of the Cambodian Government's Commission for Dolphin Conservation and Development of the Mekong Dolphin Ecotourism Zone (the "Dolphin Commission").

Information about many Cambodian musicians of the 1960s and 1970s, and many of their recordings, were lost during the Khmer Rouge regime. Interest in that scene's musicians was revived, especially among western rock fans, in the late 1990s with the release of compilation albums like Cambodian Rocks in 1996. Filmmaker John Pirozzi was introduced to the music while making the movie City of Ghosts on location in Cambodia, and subsequently featured the Drakkars (introduced as Drakkar) and several of their contemporaries in the 2015 documentary Don't Think I've Forgotten in 2015. The Drakkars’ song "Crazy Loving You" has appeared on several compilations, including the Don't Think I've Forgotten soundtrack, and the song "Do You No Wrong Again" (credited to Thra Kha Band) has appeared on compilations like the 2011 CD Cambodia Rock Spectacular! from Lion Productions.

Surviving members of the Drakkars first regrouped for a reunion concert in Singapore in 2011. They also performed in 2014 and 2015 to commemorate the release of Don't Think I've Forgotten and announced plans to record a new album. The 2014 performance featured a guest appearance by Chhom Nimol of the Cambodian/American band Dengue Fever. Nimol, whose band was inspired by and frequently covers late-60s and early-70s Khmer pop music, proclaimed "I never dreamed I would play with those musicians. They are like my teachers, my masters." A new version of the band led by Touch Seang Tana began performing regularly under the name Drakka Band in 2015.

Master tapes for the Drakkars’ 1974 album were unearthed during this period, and in 2014 it was released as Drakkar '74 by Metal Postcard Records. Personnel at the label had been inspired by Cambodian Rocks and Don't Think I've Forgotten to track down the master tapes and remaster them for the digital market. Upon its release, one music critic noted the album's historical importance and hailed it as "The Holy Grail of Cambodian Psych."
