= Liev Tuk =

Cambodian rock musician

Liev Tuk, from an early 1970s record cover.

Liev Tuk (sometimes spelled Liv Tek, Khmer: លីវ ទឹក) was a Cambodian rock and soul musician active before the Khmer Rouge.

== Musical style ==
Tuk's music incorporates elements from a variety of American popular genres, such as rhythm and blues, soul, and rock. Critics and historians have drawn comparisons with Wilson Pickett and James Brown, both important figures in American soul music.

He was an animated "rock star" performer, combining his loud, fast music with colorful movements and dancing. LinDa Saphan described him as having "sultry looks, swinging arms and dynamic vocal style [that] drove teenage listeners wild."

== Legacy ==
Tuk was featured in Norodom Sihanouk's 1968 film The Joy of Life. A performance from that film was later included in the 2015 documentary Don't Think I've Forgotten, juxtaposed with a clip of Wilson Pickett to show influence and similarities.

Two of Tuk's songs appeared on the 1996 album Cambodian Rocks: "Rom Sue Sue" ("Dance Soul Soul"), which has been likened to "Hip-Hug-Her" by Booker T and the MG's, and "Sou Slarp Kroam Kombut Srey" ("Rather Die Under the Women's Sword"), performed with Yol Aularong. The compilation of Cambodian psychedelic and garage rock from the late 1960s and 1970s was controversially published as a bootleg, without providing attribution to the artists, even after they had been identified. It sparked, in part, Western interest in the music and was followed by a number of similar compilations, many of which feature Tuk among contemporaries like Yol Aularong, Sinn Sisamouth, Meas Samon, Ros Serey Sothea, and Pan Ron.

== Filmography ==
He appeared uncredited as a singer in the film The Joy of Living.
