= Cambodian rock (1960s–1970s) =

- Stylistic origins: Traditional Khmer music; rock and roll; psychedelic rock; garage rock; romvong; saravan; jazz; bossanova; Latin; blues; cha cha cha; À gogo; film
- Cultural origins: Late 1950s, Phnom Penh, Cambodia
- Typical instruments: Electric guitar; bass; drums; organ; horns; vocals

Cambodian rock of the 1960s and 1970s was a thriving and prolific music scene based in Phnom Penh, Cambodia, in which musicians created a unique sound by combining traditional Cambodian music forms with rock and pop influences from records imported into the country from Latin America, Europe, and the United States. U.S. armed forces radio that had been broadcast to troops stationed nearby during the Vietnam War was also a primary influence. This music scene was abruptly crushed by the Khmer Rouge communists in 1975, and many of its musicians disappeared or were executed during the ensuing Cambodian genocide. Due to its unique sounds and the tragic fate of many of its performers, the Cambodian rock scene has attracted the interest of music historians and record collectors, and the genre gained new popularity upon the international release of numerous compilation albums starting in the late 1990s.

== Post-independence period ==
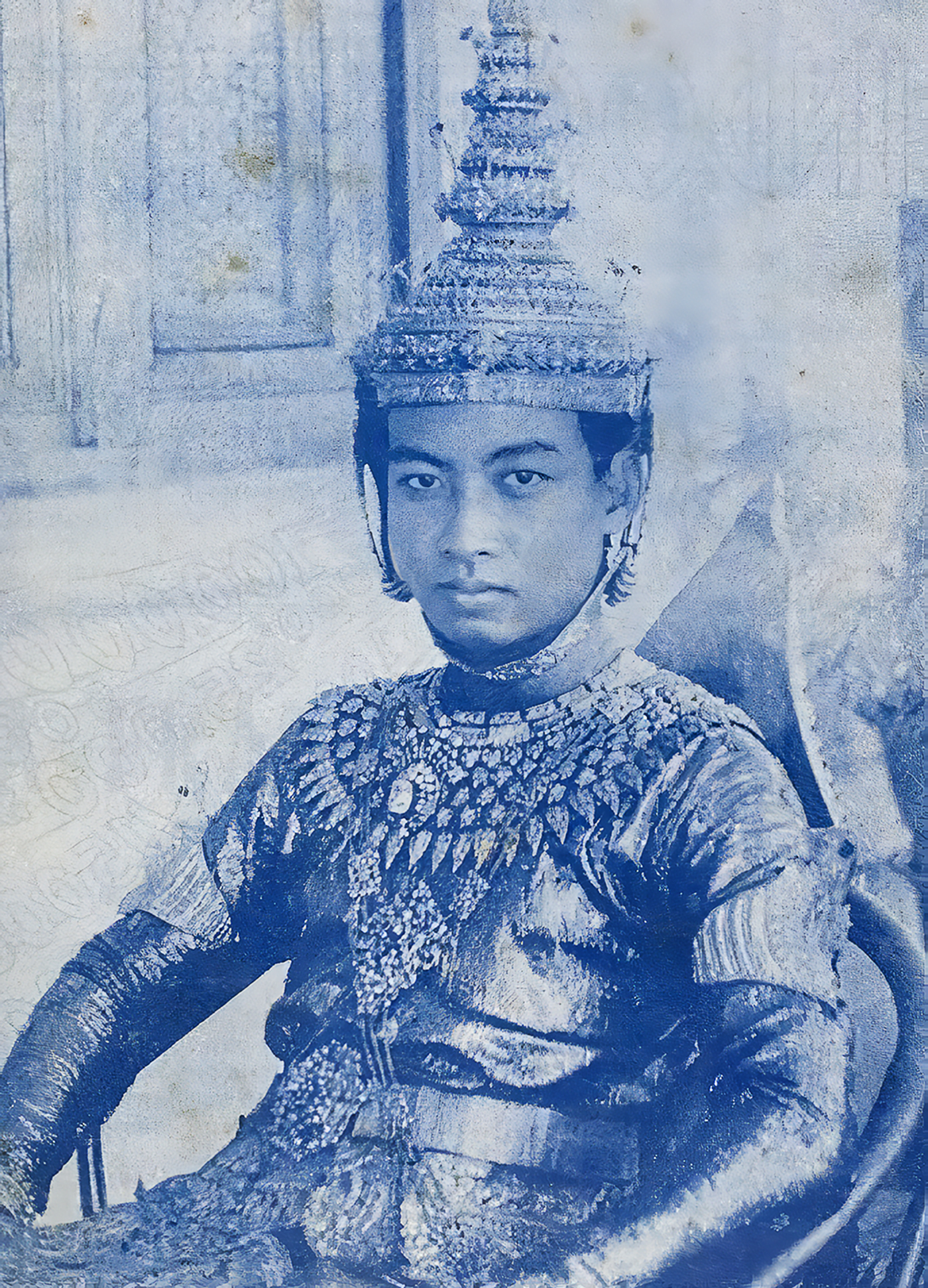
The young Norodom Sihanouk fostered Cambodian popular music starting in the 1950s.

Cambodia gained independence from France in 1953, under the leadership of young king Norodom Sihanouk. Sihanouk was a musician and songwriter, and fostered the development of homegrown popular music in the newly independent country. Under Sihanouk's rule, it was common for government ministries to have their own orchestras or singing groups to perform at official state functions and royal receptions. For example, Sihanouk's mother, Queen Sisowath Kossamak, sponsored the Vong Phleng Preah Reach Troap (the classical ensemble of the Royal Treasury), and in approximately 1957 invited the young Sinn Sisamouth to join the ensemble as his first professional music job.

Cambodia's international relations with France and various countries in Latin America fostered the importation of pop records into the country, while children from wealthy Cambodian families often attended school in France and returned with French pop records that were widely traded among fans in Phnom Penh. French pop singers Sylvie Vartan and Johnny Hallyday were particularly popular. Latin jazz, cha cha cha, and À gogo records imported from Latin America also became popular in the capital city. By the late 1950s, these genres inspired a flourishing pop music scene in Phnom Penh, featuring singers who created a unique sound by combining traditional Cambodian music forms with these new international influences. Sinn Sisamouth, Mao Sareth, So Savoeun, Chhuon Malay, Sieng Di, and Sos Math were among the earliest stars in this pop scene, with Sisamouth in particular becoming a leader of popular trends in which Cambodian musicians absorbed more international influences, eventually leading to the development of Cambodian rock music.

By 1959, American and British pop and early rock and roll records began to appear in Cambodia, inspiring teenage fans in particular. That year, teen brothers Mol Kagnol and Mol Kamach formed Baksey Cham Krong, widely considered to be Cambodia's first rock band. The band originally performed crooning vocal music inspired by Paul Anka and Pat Boone, then added inspiration from the guitar-driven music of The Ventures and Chuck Berry. They likened themselves to Cliff Richard and The Shadows, and modeled their stage presence after Richard's 1961 movie The Young Ones. Baksey Cham Krong exerted a wide influence on the Cambodian rock and pop scene, and their popularity inspired older singers like Sinn Sisamouth to add rock songs to their repertoires. Many later Cambodian rock musicians cited the band as a formative influence.

By the mid-1960s, Sinn Sisamouth had become Cambodia's most well-known pop music performer, and his music increasingly incorporated rock influences, including psychedelic rock and garage rock. By this time, the Cambodian music scene was further influenced by Western rock and soul music via U.S. armed forces radio that had been broadcast to troops stationed nearby during the Vietnam War. Sisamouth fostered the careers of younger singers and musicians, writing songs for them while also utilizing them in many of his own songs. Pen Ran (also known as Pan Ron) was one of the earliest rock-oriented female singers in the Cambodian scene, first emerging in 1963 with traditional pop songs but moving into rock music by 1966 via duets with Sisamouth as well as her own songs. Pen Ran was particularly influential, known for her flirtatious dancing and risque lyrics that subverted traditional Khmer gender roles.

Sisamouth was also instrumental in launching the career of Ros Serey Sothea, who had been singing at weddings and quickly became the leading female singer in the Cambodian rock scene after her emergence in 1967. Sothea received wide recognition for her high and clear singing voice, and her ability to convey emotions from mischief and flirtation to heartbreak and tragedy. Sothea was also one of many female singers in the rock scene to utilize the traditional "ghost voice" Cambodian singing technique, featuring a high register with quick jumps among octaves, creating an effect that has been compared to yodeling. This was another factor in the genre's unique sound.

Sothea maintained an active career with her own songs as well as many popular duets with Sisamouth. In a reflection of her popularity with the Cambodian people, Sothea was honored by Head of State Norodom Sihanouk with the royal title of Preah Reich Theany Somlang Meas, the "Queen with the Golden Voice". Sihanouk continued to support the Cambodian music scene through his patronage of the national radio station, allowing the station to promote local music. A regular rock music show hosted by DJ Huoy Meas was popular with teenagers and college students, making Meas a national celebrity. She became a popular singer as well, known particularly for highly personal lyrics that subverted the social expectations placed on Khmer women, and a melancholic voice that Sihanouk compared to Édith Piaf.

The Cambodian rock scene was also notable for its prolific nature, with musicians recording large numbers of songs that were continuously released as singles. For example, Sinn Sisamouth is confirmed to have written more than one thousand songs, and the true total is likely to be much higher. Sisamouth, Ros Serey Sothea, Pen Ran and others also maintained separate music careers concurrently. Their rock n' roll records, which were popular with younger people, were released alongside works in other genres including traditional Cambodian music, romantic ballads, and film music, with those latter genres remaining popular with the country's older music fans. Ros Serey Sothea and Pen Ran are both believed to have sung on hundreds of songs, and Pen Ran wrote many of her songs herself.

== Khmer Republic period ==
By 1969, Norodom Sihanouk had lost the support of many urban and educated Cambodians due to his inability to keep the hostilities of the Vietnam War from spilling across the country's borders. In March 1970, Sihanouk was deposed by the Cambodian National Assembly and replaced by military leader Lon Nol, thus forming the right-wing, pro-American Khmer Republic. Rock musicians in Phnom Penh generally favored the new Khmer Republic government and turned against Sihanouk, particularly after he attempted to maintain his support in Cambodia's rural countryside by aligning with the communist Khmer Rouge insurgents. Many singers, including Sinn Sisamouth, released patriotic songs and made public appearances to support the Khmer Republic military. Ros Serey Sothea released a song called "The Traitor" that directly criticized Sihanouk, her former patron. Sothea also directly participated in the Khmer Republic military; a film of her parachuting out of a plane during a paratrooper exercise is the only known video footage of her to have survived.

The Khmer Republic's increased relations with the United States, plus the prevalence of U.S. Armed Forces Radio that had been broadcast to troops in nearby South Vietnam and could be picked up in Phnom Penh, allowed new musical influences to infiltrate the Cambodian rock scene. This inspired a diversification in that scene's sounds, fashions, and lyrical content starting in about 1970. For example, singer/guitarist Yol Aularong was influenced by garage rock and specialized in sarcastic lyrics that poked fun at conservative Cambodian society. Aularong has been described as a "proto-punk" by the New York Times.

Additional examples of this new wave of Cambodian rock musicians include Meas Samon, who combined the showmanship of a comedian with satirical lyrics and psychedelic rock sounds. Liev Tuk adopted American soul and funk, with a belting vocal style that has been compared to Wilson Pickett and James Brown. Pou Vannary, unusually for a female singer in the genre, was also an instrumentalist who could accompany herself on acoustic guitar in the mode of an American singer-songwriter, displaying a vocal style that was much more relaxed and intimate than her contemporaries. The self-contained band The Drakkars played hard rock music that has been compared to Santana and Led Zeppelin. These musicians also adopted hippie hairstyles and fashions, as further indicators of American influence in Cambodia at the time.

This latest wave of rock musicians, plus established stars like Sinn Sisamouth and Ros Serey Sothea, continued their music careers throughout the early 1970s. However, the Cambodian Civil War took its toll on the country, as did American bombing campaigns associated with the Vietnam War. Due to wartime curfews, musicians often had to play in clubs during the day and often heard nearby gunfire and explosions during their performances. The Cambodian rock scene persevered in this fashion until the fall of the Khmer Republic in April 1975.

== Khmer Rouge period and the Cambodian genocide ==
The Cambodian Civil War ended in April 1975 when the communist Khmer Rouge defeated the Khmer Republic and gained control of the country. The Khmer Rouge ordered the two million residents of Phnom Penh to evacuate the city and move to prison farms and labor camps, The city's musicians were included in this forced exodus. The Khmer Rouge regime, led by Pol Pot, wanted to return the nation of Cambodia to an idyllic notion of the past by implementing a radical form of agrarian socialism while simultaneously shunning outside aid and influence. In order to build and protect their utopian goals, the Khmer Rouge perceived enmity in anyone tied to the previous Cambodian governments, ethnic and religious minorities, intellectuals, and members of certain professions. In the ensuing Cambodian genocide, about 25 percent of the Cambodian population perished. More than half of those who died during the genocide are believed to have been directly executed. The rest died through forced labor, malnutrition, and disease due to the Khmer Rouge's cruelty and poor management of its utopian project.

Pol Pot and the Khmer Rouge targeted musicians during the Cambodian genocide.

Musicians posed an apparent threat to the Khmer Rouge regime due to their influence on culture, incompatibility with an agrarian lifestyle, and foreign influences. Many of Cambodia's rock musicians disappeared during the genocide and their exact fates have never been confirmed. Due to these musicians' enduring popularity with the Cambodian people, reports differ on how some of them died. Sinn Sisamouth and Ros Serey Sothea are both believed to have been summarily executed by Khmer Rouge soldiers out of fear that their popularity could foment resistance among the population. However, these reports have never been confirmed. Meas Samon is believed to have been executed at a work site after refusing to stop playing music during breaks. Other musicians like Pen Ran, Yol Aularong, and Pou Vannary simply disappeared sometime between 1975 and 1979 with no information available about their fates, as is the case with most of the ordinary Cambodians who perished during the genocide.

Some Cambodian rock musicians survived the genocide through various hardships. For example, Drakkars guitarist Touch Chhatha was among many professional musicians who were forced to play traditional and patriotic music every day to Khmer Rouge troops. Chhatha's bandmate Touch Seang Tana survived several years' imprisonment at a work camp by pretending to be a common peasant. During the Khmer Rouge takeover of Phnom Penh, singer Sieng Vannthy was confronted by insurgents who demanded to know her occupation. She lied and said she was a banana seller, which probably saved her life as the Khmer Rouge were already known to target musicians for imprisonment or execution.

As with many other aspects of pre-Khmer Rouge Cambodian culture, much of the country's rock music and information about the musicians was lost during the chaos of the regime. In their attempt to "purify" Cambodian society and culture, Khmer Rouge soldiers were known to destroy records and master tapes containing any Western-influenced music genres, and often forced residents to burn their record collections. The only Cambodian rock records to survive were the few that citizens managed to hide in personal collections, and many of those were damaged to the point at which artist names or song titles had been lost. Therefore, except for fans' personal memories, much of the 1960s–1970s rock music of Cambodia was lost until it was slowly rediscovered starting in the 1990s.

Relations between the Khmer Rouge regime and neighboring Vietnam collapsed in late 1978, igniting the Cambodian–Vietnamese War. Vietnam launched a full-scale military invasion of Cambodia in December 1978 and captured Phnom Penh the following month, thus ending the Khmer Rouge regime and the Cambodian genocide. Vietnamese forces sent the Khmer Rouge into exile in Thailand and installed Heng Samrin as the new leader of the restored Cambodia. Residents who had been exiled to farm camps and other Khmer Rouge installations were invited to return to Phnom Penh. Singer Sieng Vannthy, who had survived the genocide, was invited to make an announcement on Cambodia's national radio station that residents were welcome to return to the city. Those who did not return were considered dead, including musicians.

== Rediscovery ==
After the fall of the Khmer Rouge, surviving Cambodian rock musicians regrouped and attempted to locate missing colleagues. Many musicians contacted Ros Saboeut, older sister of Ros Serey Sothea, to inquire about Sothea's fate. Sothea did not survive the genocide but Saboeut took the opportunity to reunite Cambodia's surviving rock musicians, maintaining a list of contacts. Saboeut's efforts are widely credited with reviving Cambodian popular music in the aftermath of the genocide. According to Youk Chhang, the executive director of the Documentation Center of Cambodia, Saboeut sought to restore Cambodian music as a tribute to her sister, saying "I think she was bound by the legacy of her sister to help."

As with all other aspects of Cambodian society and culture, the country's music scene faced a tough but relatively fast recovery. The post-Khmer Rouge government made specific moves to re-establish the country's radio industry, allowing surviving singers and musicians to resume their careers by creating new entertainment content. For example, Drakkars drummer Ouk Sam Art and guitarist Touch Chhatha were able to return to music work at Cambodia's national radio station. The Cambodian music scene moved on to more modern pop forms, consigning the country's 1960s–1970s rock music to the memories of older fans who had survived the genocide.

In the ensuing years, fans of Cambodian rock music found and reproduced the few records and master tapes that survived the chaos of the Khmer Rouge regime. A black market in remixed and reprinted works by popular but now-deceased (and some still-living) musicians developed, with little regard for intellectual property rights, which were not enforced in Cambodia until 2003. Black marketeers were known to remix songs by artists like Ros Serey Sothea and Pen Ran to make them more dance-able for current music fans, often with unknown musicians adding stronger drum beats and other effects; some songs were also artificially sped up so more could be squeezed onto inexpensive cassettes to be sold on the street. This unauthorized marketplace allowed Cambodian rock songs to remain popular well into the 1990s; original and authentic master recordings are highly sought by collectors and preservationists, though few are known to have survived the Khmer Rouge regime.

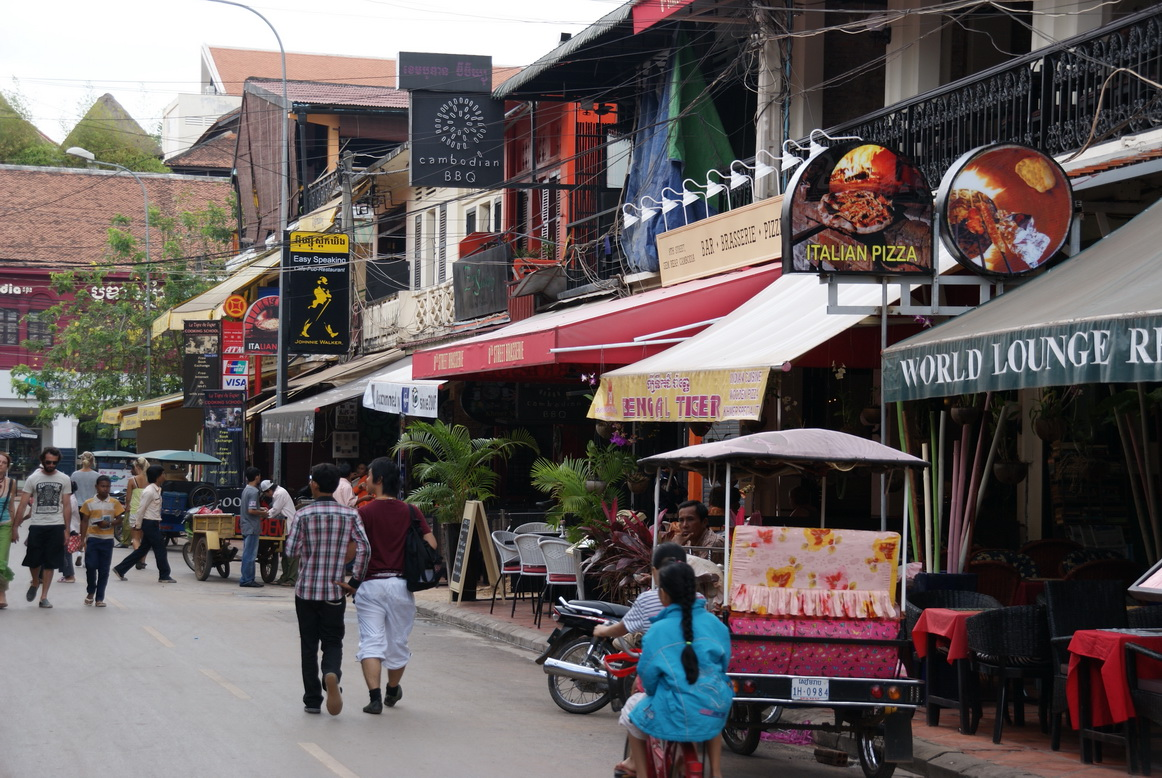
Siem Reap, where an American tourist discovered Cambodian rock music in the 1990s.

The Cambodian rock genre of the 1960s–1970s remained largely unknown to the outside world until the late 1990s. While on a tourist trip to Cambodia in 1994, American Paul Wheeler became interested in music he had been hearing around Siem Reap. He purchased some unmarked cassettes from a market vendor and assembled a mixtape of his favorite tracks. The Parallel World label, upon hearing Wheeler's mixtape, assembled the 13-track compilation album Cambodian Rocks and released 1,000 copies on vinyl in 1996. When those sold out, the label issued the much more widely known CD version with 22 tracks. Wheeler made no effort to discover the song titles or the names of the artists, and Cambodian Rocks was released with no supporting information, thus giving it the appearance of a bootleg. In the years since the CD's release, interested listeners have collaborated on the Internet to confirm the artist names and song titles, discovering that ten of the album's 22 songs were by Ros Serey Sothea, with other tracks by Sinn Sisamouth, Pen Ran, Yol Aularong, Meas Samon, and Liev Tuk.

Cambodian Rocks was widely praised by the Western rock community. Rolling Stone called it "a marvel of cultural appropriation," and Far East Audio called it an "instant classic." Further illustrating the unique nature of the music to Western ears, writer Nick Hanover called the album "a continuous surprise, a fusion of elements that should be contradictory but somehow strike a balance of West and East." The New York Times said the album and the circumstances of its release "established a lasting aura of mystery around the music." Cambodian Rocks was the first release of its kind, followed by a number of similar compilations like Cambodian Cassette Archives and others with similar titles.

The 2002 film City of Ghosts, a crime thriller that takes place in Cambodia, featured songs by Sinn Sisamouth, Pen Ran, Ros Serey Sothea, Meas Samon, and Chhuon Malay on its soundtrack. American filmmaker John Pirozzi, a production assistant for City of Ghosts, was given a copy of Cambodian Rocks while working in the country and decided to research the musicians on the album and their fates at the hands of the Khmer Rouge. His research ultimately resulted in the 2015 film Don't Think I've Forgotten, which was named after a Sinn Sisamouth song.

Pirozzi's first film project on Cambodian rock music was the 2009 documentary Sleepwalking Through the Mekong that covered a 2005 Cambodian tour by the band Dengue Fever. The film finds that the 1960s–1970s Cambodian rock music played by the band was still popular with the country's people, and fans were interested in seeing a mostly American band perform the songs. Dengue Fever also released a charity compilation of 1960s–1970s Cambodian rock songs called Electric Cambodia in 2010.

After ten years of research in conjunction with Cambodian-born artist and sociology professor LinDa Saphan, Pirozzi completed the documentary Don't Think I've Forgotten in 2015, featuring in-depth profiles of many of the Cambodian rock scene's most influential performers. The film received almost universally positive reviews, further igniting worldwide interest in the Cambodian rock music scene. The film's international release inspired reunion concerts by surviving members of The Drakkars, and concerts celebrating the legacy of Sinn Sisamouth and his contemporaries. The film's soundtrack album contained many professionally restored songs that had not been available on other compilations, including some by rarely compiled artists like Baksey Cham Krong, Pou Vannary, Huoy Meas, and Sieng Vannthy.

== Legacy and influence ==
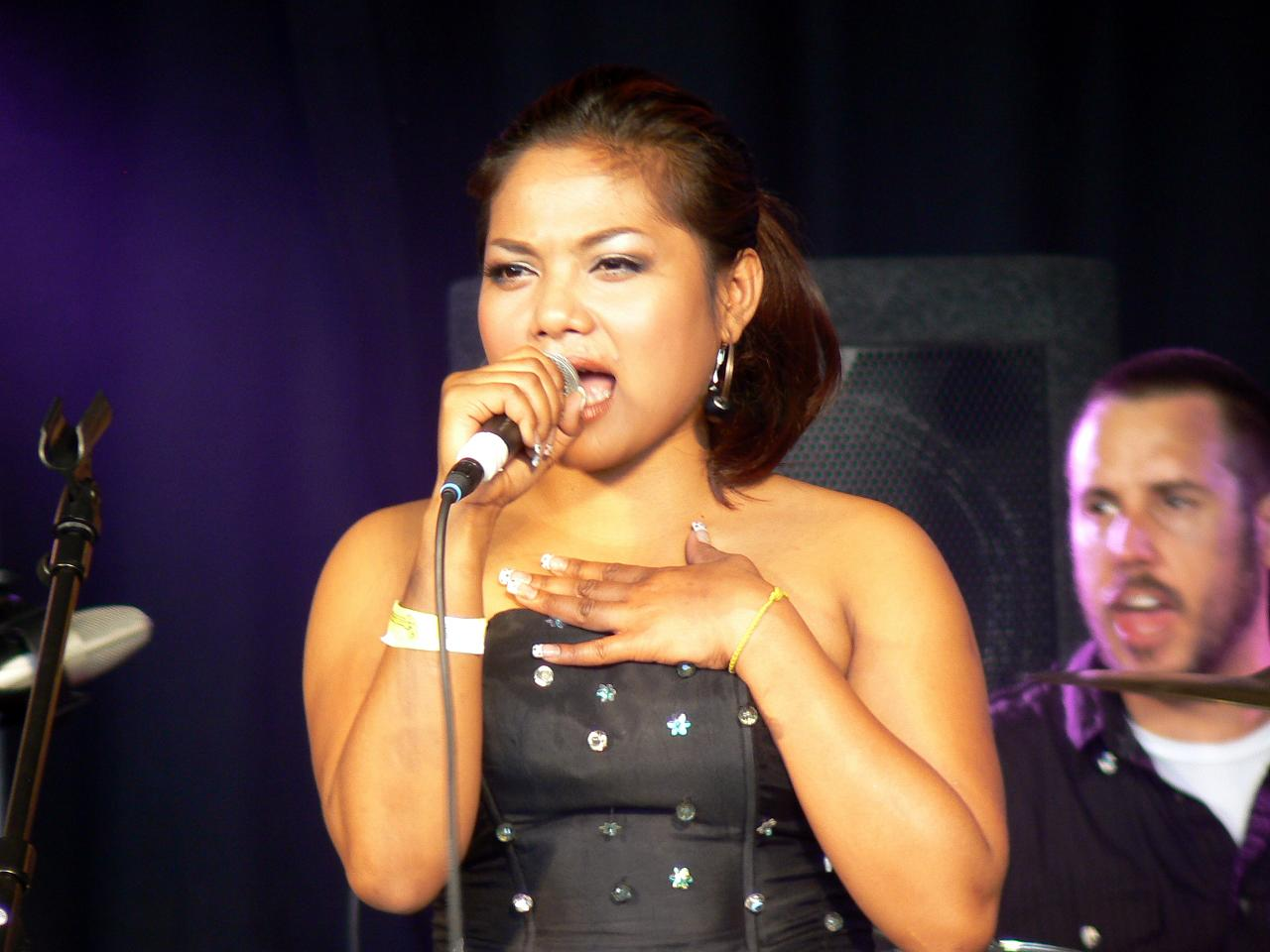
Singer Chhom Nimol and drummer Paul Smith of the Cambodian-American band Dengue Fever.

The Cambodian Rocks album and similar compilations are believed to have inspired the formation of several modern bands who perform cover versions of original Cambodian rock songs and create new music based on that genre. For example, in the late 1990s American rock keyboardist Ethan Holtzman discovered the genre while traveling in Cambodia, and his guitarist brother Zac Holtzman had coincidentally discovered the same music while working at a California record store. In 2001, the brothers formed the band Dengue Fever with Cambodian-born Chhom Nimol, who had previously been a well-known singer in her native country before emigrating to the United States. Dengue Fever first performed covers of original Cambodian rock songs discovered by the Holtzman brothers, but have since released several albums of original material inspired by the genre. Meanwhile, the band Cambodian Space Project was formed in 2009 in Cambodia by singer Kak Channthy and Australian enthusiast Julien Poulson; that band released five albums of covers of 1960s–1970s Cambodian rock songs and original songs inspired by the genre. Cambodian Space Project disbanded in March 2018 when Channthy was killed in a car accident.

The Cambodian rock scene of the 1960s–1970s has also become a matter of interest to record collectors around the world, while specialists like Dust-to-Digital have embarked on projects to locate and restore surviving records. In addition to enthusiasts like Dengue Fever, other western musicians have become fans of the genre. One example is hip-hop songwriter/producer Danger Mouse, who noted "There were these groups... who took Beatles songs and whatever else, put their own lyrics in and called it whatever they wanted to. [...] It sounds like nothing you've ever heard."

Cambodian-American singer Bochan Huy is one of a new generation of musicians from that culture who are revisiting 1960s–1970s Cambodian rock with the goal of preserving the music and addressing its troubled history. Singer-songwriter Sin Setsochhata, a granddaughter of Sinn Sisamouth, has gained international notice for combining Cambodian rock influences with modern pop sounds. Cambodian rapper VannDa regularly references the country's 1960s–1970s rock musicians in his lyrics. The 2018 off-Broadway musical Cambodian Rock Band by Lauren Yee is inspired by the genre and its historical backdrop.

== Notable artists ==
The Cambodian rock scene of the 1960s–1970s was very robust, with hundreds of active performers. Information on many of them remains lost after the chaos of the Khmer Rouge regime, while some others remain to be discovered by Western journalists and enthusiasts. The list below includes those musicians whose works have become available in the West.

- Baksey Cham Krong
- Chhun Vanna
- Chhuon Malay
- Dara Chom Chan
- The Drakkars
- Eung Nary
- Huoy Meas
- Im Song Soeum
- In Yeng
- Keo Montha
- Koy Sarim
- Liev Tuk
- Mao Sareth
- Meas Samon
- Pen Ran
- Pou Vannary
- Ros Serey Sothea
- Sieng Dy
- Sieng Vannthy
- Sinn Sisamouth
- So Savoeun
- Sos Math
- Vor Sarun
- Yol Aularong

== See also ==
- Dance in Cambodia
- Music of Cambodia
- Traditional Cambodian musical instruments
