= Dengue Fever (band) =

American band

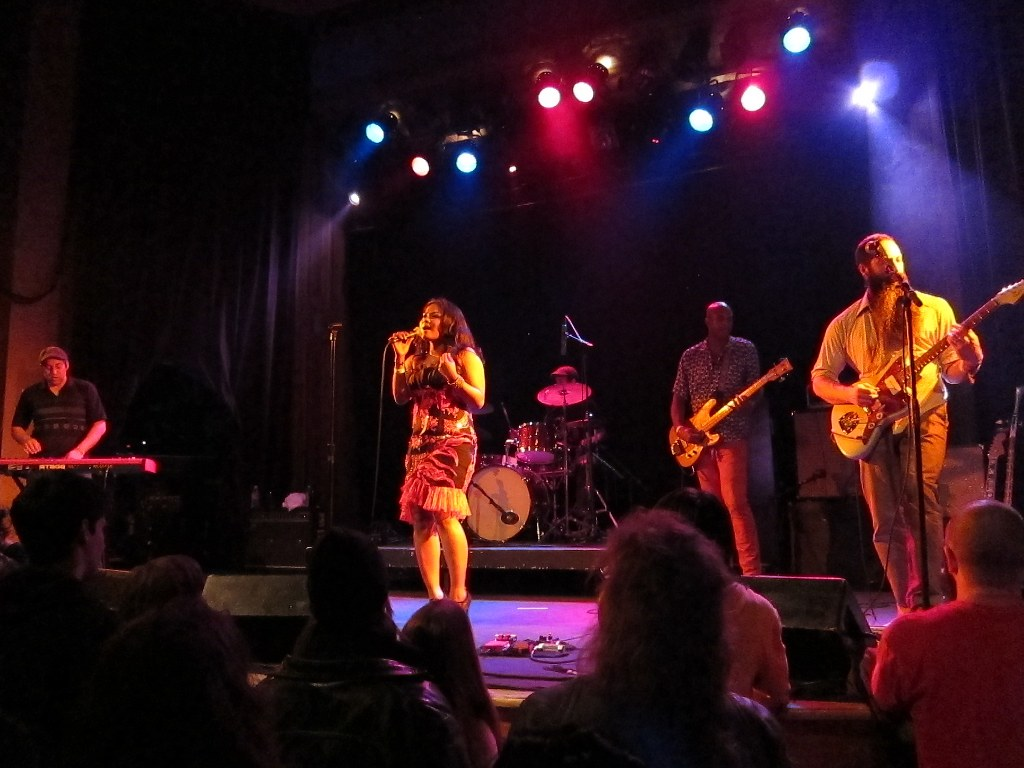

Background information
- Origin: Los Angeles, California, U.S.
- Genres: Cambodian rock; psychedelic pop; surf rock
- Years active: 2001–present
- Labels: TUK TUK Records, M80 Music, Birdman, Real World, Republic
- Members: Chhom Nimol; Zac Holtzman; Ethan Holtzman; Senon Williams; David Ralicke; Paul Smith
- Website: www.denguefevermusic.com

Dengue Fever is an American band from Los Angeles who combine Cambodian rock and pop music of the 1960s and 70s with psychedelic rock and other world music styles. Their most recent album, Ting Mong, was released in September 2023.

== History ==
In the late 1990s, keyboardist Ethan Holtzman discovered Cambodian psychedelic rock music while traveling in that country. Coincidentally, his guitarist brother Zac Holtzman (then with the band Dieselhed) had discovered the same music while working at a record store. The brothers formed Dengue Fever in 2001 to perform songs recorded by Cambodian artists like Sinn Sisamouth, Ros Serey Sothea, Pen Ran, and others, most of whom died or disappeared during the Khmer Rouge regime. The band first recruited bassist Senon Williams (also a member of Radar Bros. until 2009), former Beck saxophonist/flutist David Rallicke, and drummer Paul Smith. The band then decided to add a vocalist who could sing the Khmer lyrics of the Cambodian songs they hoped to play, and auditioned singers in the Little Phnom Penh area of Long Beach. The band selected Chhom Nimol, who had previously been a well-known singer in Cambodia before emigrating to the United States.

Their self-titled debut album was released in 2003. The album consisted mostly of 1960s-70s Cambodian rock songs discovered by the Holtzman brothers, plus two original songs in the same style. Nimol sang all lyrics in Khmer. The band's later albums are mostly made up of originals, first written in English by the Holtzmans before being translated; while Nimol still usually sings in Khmer but occasionally in English as well.

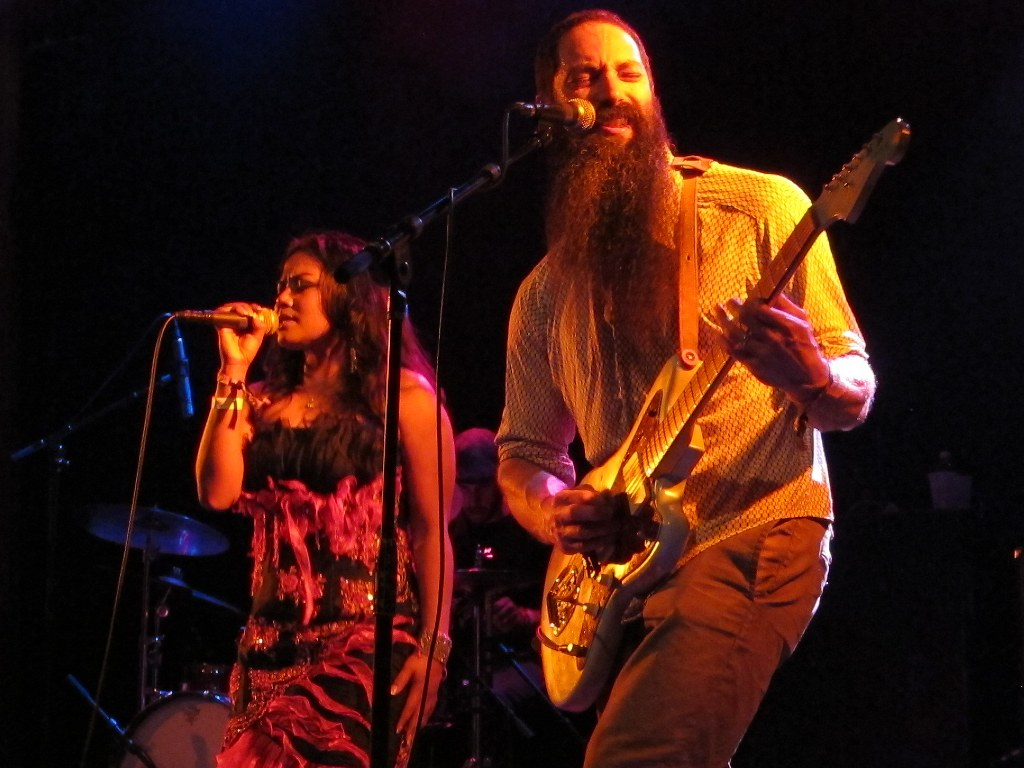
Dengue Fever at the Bluebird Theater in 2012

Their second album Escape from Dragon House was released in 2005. Also in 2005, the band toured Cambodia during the Bon Om Thook water festival, to critical acclaim. The 2009 documentary film Sleepwalking Through the Mekong by producer John Pirozzi documents the tour, with coverage of concert performances, collaborations with master musicians, and Chhom Nimol's success in reconnecting with Cambodian fans who had not seen her perform in person for five years. The documentary finds that the 1960s-70s Cambodian rock music played by the band was still very popular in that country, and fans were interested in seeing a mostly-American band perform the songs. John Pirozzi, also a fan of that music, later produced the documentary film Don't Think I've Forgotten with involvement from some of the members of Dengue Fever.

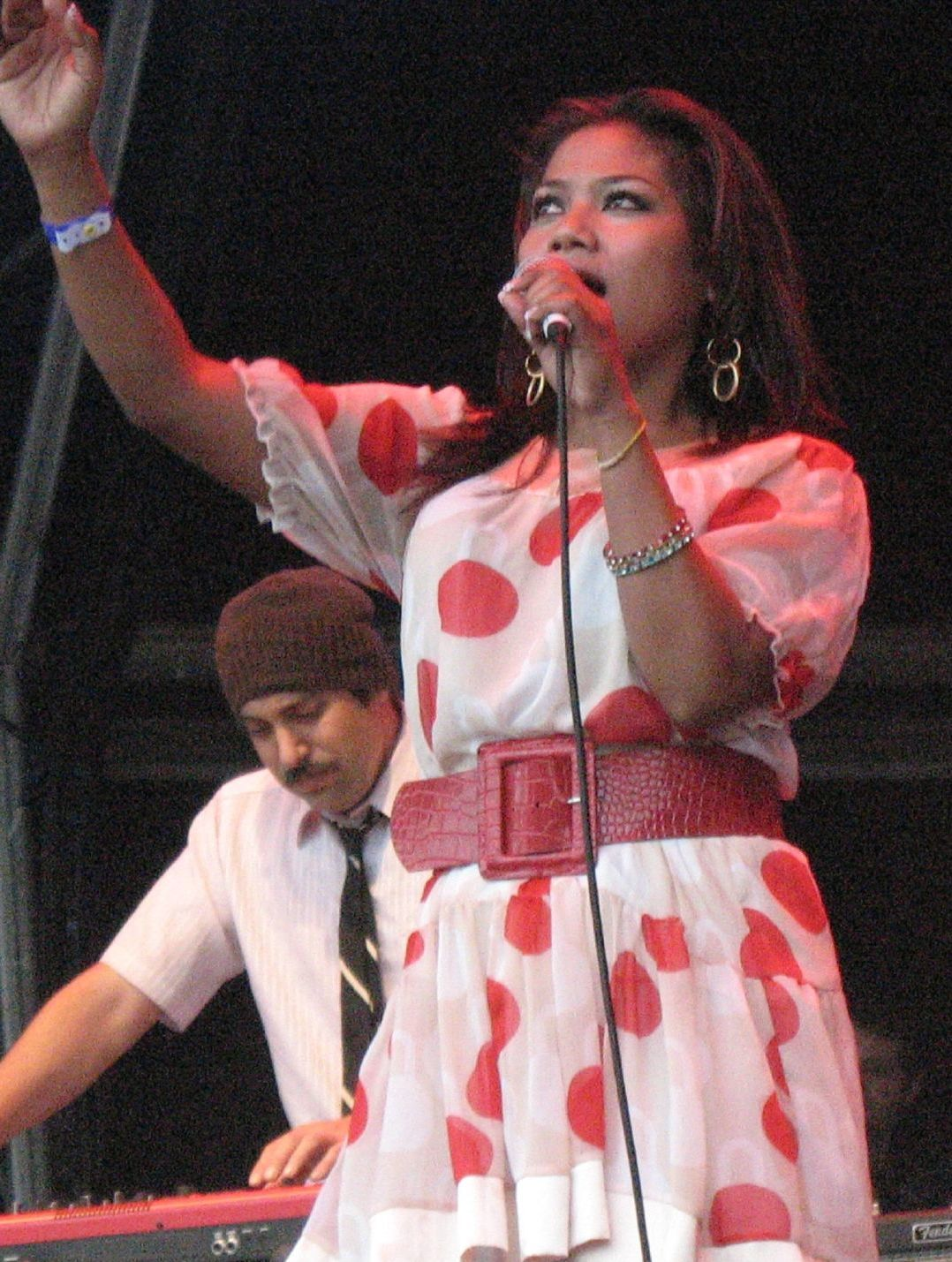
Dengue Fever at Beautiful Days Festival 2008

In 2008, Real World Records released Venus On Earth in all territories outside of the U.S. and Canada. Peter Gabriel, founder of their new label, said of the deal, "We have Dengue Fever coming out on Real World Records (outside of the USA) - it’s really cool stuff, with the small Cambodian singer and big American guys behind! They’re California based but have taken 60’s Cambodian pop as their main source of inspiration and it’s done with a lot of style. It’s spirited, impassioned stuff." The album won the award for Best Fusion Album at the 2009 Independent Music Awards.

In 2011 the band released the album Cannibal Courtship, which was noted for incorporating more world music elements beyond the band's established Cambodian influences. Their fifth full-length album, The Deepest Lake, was released in 2015 and was noted for expanding the band's sound even further into girl group pop, surf music, jazz, African rhythms, and other styles while retaining its roots in Cambodian psychedelic rock. In 2017, Dengue Fever embarked on their longest-ever American tour as the support act for Tinariwen.

In 2018, Dengue Fever contributed several songs to the theater production Cambodian Rock Band by Lauren Yee, a play about a young Cambodian-American whose father was a musician persecuted by the Khmer Rouge. The band's first new album in eight years, Ting Mong, was released in September 2023.

== Philanthropy ==
Dengue Fever has entered into partnerships with a number of charitable organizations to support causes in Cambodia. As one example, they are involved with the wildlife and forest conservation organization Wildlife Alliance. The band compiled an album of original 1960s-70s Cambodian rock songs titled Electric Cambodia in 2010, with all proceeds donated to Cambodian Living Arts, an organization that seeks to preserve the traditional and popular Cambodian music that was nearly lost during the country's recent historical struggles. The band has also donated songs for benefit records produced by Sweet Relief Musicians Fund, a charity that provides financial assistance to musicians dealing with illness, disability, or age-related issues.

== Discography ==
- Dengue Fever (2003)
- Dengue Fever (EP, 2005)
- Escape from Dragon House (2005)
- Sip Off the Mekong (EP, 2006)
- Venus on Earth (2008)
- Sleepwalking Through the Mekong (Soundtrack, 2009)
- In the Ley Lines (Live, 2009)
- Cannibal Courtship (2011)
- Girl from the North (EP, 2013)
- The Deepest Lake (2015)
- Ganadaramaba (EP, 2016)
- Ting Mong (2023)

== Use in other media ==
- "Ethanopium", a cover of a song by Ethiopian jazz musician Mulatu Astatke, was included in the soundtrack of Jim Jarmusch's 2005 film Broken Flowers.
- "One Thousand Tears of a Tarantula" was included on the soundtrack for the second-season finale of the Showtime series Weeds, as well as on the recap of that episode for the third season.
- The band's Khmer cover of Joni Mitchell's "Both Sides Now" was included on the soundtrack of Matt Dillon's 2002 film set in Cambodia, City of Ghosts.
- "Seeing Hands" was used in the UK television series Dirty Sanchez.
- "Escape From Dragon House" was featured in the fourth episode of True Blood.
- "Sni Bong" was featured in episode 21 of Welcome to Night Vale.
- "New Year's Eve" was used for a bwin commercial in German television.
