= In the Life of Music =

2018 film

- Film poster
- Directed by: Caylee So; Sok Visal
- Starring: Ratanak Ben; Ellen Wong; Arn Chorn-Pond; Sreynan Chea; Vandarith Phem
- Release dates: 5 May 2018 (LAAPFF); 21 March 2019 (Cambodia)
- Running time: 92 minutes
- Country: Cambodia
- Language: Khmer
- Box office: $7,238

In the Life of Music is a 2018 Cambodian drama film directed by Caylee So and Sok Visal. It was selected as the Cambodian entry for the Best International Feature Film at the 92nd Academy Awards, but it was not nominated.

== Plot ==
Three generations are connected through the song "Champa Battambang" by Sinn Sisamouth.

The story is structured into three distinct chapters, each set in a different era:

1968 – The Meeting of Chy and Phally: In this opening chapter, the story portrays the blossoming love between Chy and Phally, set against the backdrop of pre-war Cambodia. Their relationship is marked by the shared experience of music, symbolized by "Champa Battambang."

1976 – Under the Khmer Rouge Regime: The second chapter delves into the harrowing period of the Khmer Rouge regime. Chy and Phally, now parents, endure unimaginable hardships. Their resilience is tested as they navigate life under oppressive rule, with music serving as a fleeting solace amidst the turmoil.

2007 – Hope's Journey: The final chapter introduces Hope, a young American woman of Khmer descent, who returns to Cambodia to reconnect with her roots. Through her journey, the film explores themes of identity, heritage, and the enduring legacy of music that transcends generations.

== Cast ==
- Ratanak Ben as Little Comrade
- Daniel Chea as Montha
- Socheat Chea as Samay
- Sreynan Chea as Phally
- Arn Chorn-Pond as Mith
- Ellen Wong as Hope
- Vandarith Phem as Chy

== See also ==
- List of submissions to the 92nd Academy Awards for Best International Feature Film
- List of Cambodian submissions for the Academy Award for Best International Feature Film
