= Baksey Cham Krong =

Cambodian rock band

- Baksey Cham Krong, c. 1963, from an archival photo used in the film Don't Think I've Forgotten.

Background information
- Origin: Cambodia
- Genres: Rock
- Years active: 1959–1966
- Past members: Mol Kagnol; Mol Kamach; Samley Hong

Baksey Cham Krong (also spelled Baksey Chamkrong or Baksei Chamkrong, Khmer: បក្សីចាំក្រុង) was a rock band active in pre-Khmer Rouge Cambodia. They are regarded as Cambodia's first guitar band or first soft rock band.

== History ==
Baksey Cham Krong was formed in 1959, with Mol Kagnol, his brother Mol Kamach, and Samley Hong. The Mol brothers were from a wealthy family and were able to listen to Western radio stations, becoming influenced by singers Paul Anka and Pat Boone, plus the guitar-driven music of The Ventures and Chuck Berry. Mol Kagnol, 14 years old at the time and nicknamed "Uncle Solo," played lead guitar while Kamach performed vocals. They likened themselves to Cliff Richard and The Shadows, and modeled their stage presence after Richard's 1961 movie The Young Ones.

They gained popularity in Cambodia, but due to their parents' disapproval, along with the unlikelihood of turning music into a viable career, the group broke up in 1966. Mol Kamach went to college to study finance, and Mol Kagnol went on to study engineering. Kagnol joined the military and was training in the United States when the Khmer Rouge took power in 1975, killing at least 20 of the Mol brothers' family members during the ensuing Cambodian genocide. All members of the band are still alive.

The band was featured in the 2015 documentary film Don't Think I've Forgotten. In an interview with Mol Kagnol, he said that he remembers his brother attracting a lot of girls, and that he attracted a lot of boys who wanted to learn to play guitar. According to Folio Weekly, the band "created a tsunami of guitar bands that played everything from hot-rod rock to go-go." Baksey Cham Krong's music exerted a wide influence on the Cambodian rock and pop scene, while older singers like Sinn Sisamouth were inspired by the band's popularity to add rock songs to their repertoires.

The band reunited for a performance in New York City in 2015, with another pre-Khmer Rouge rock band, Drakkar, which cites Baksey Cham Krong as one of its influences.
