= National Day of Remembrance (Cambodia) =

Annual event in Cambodia

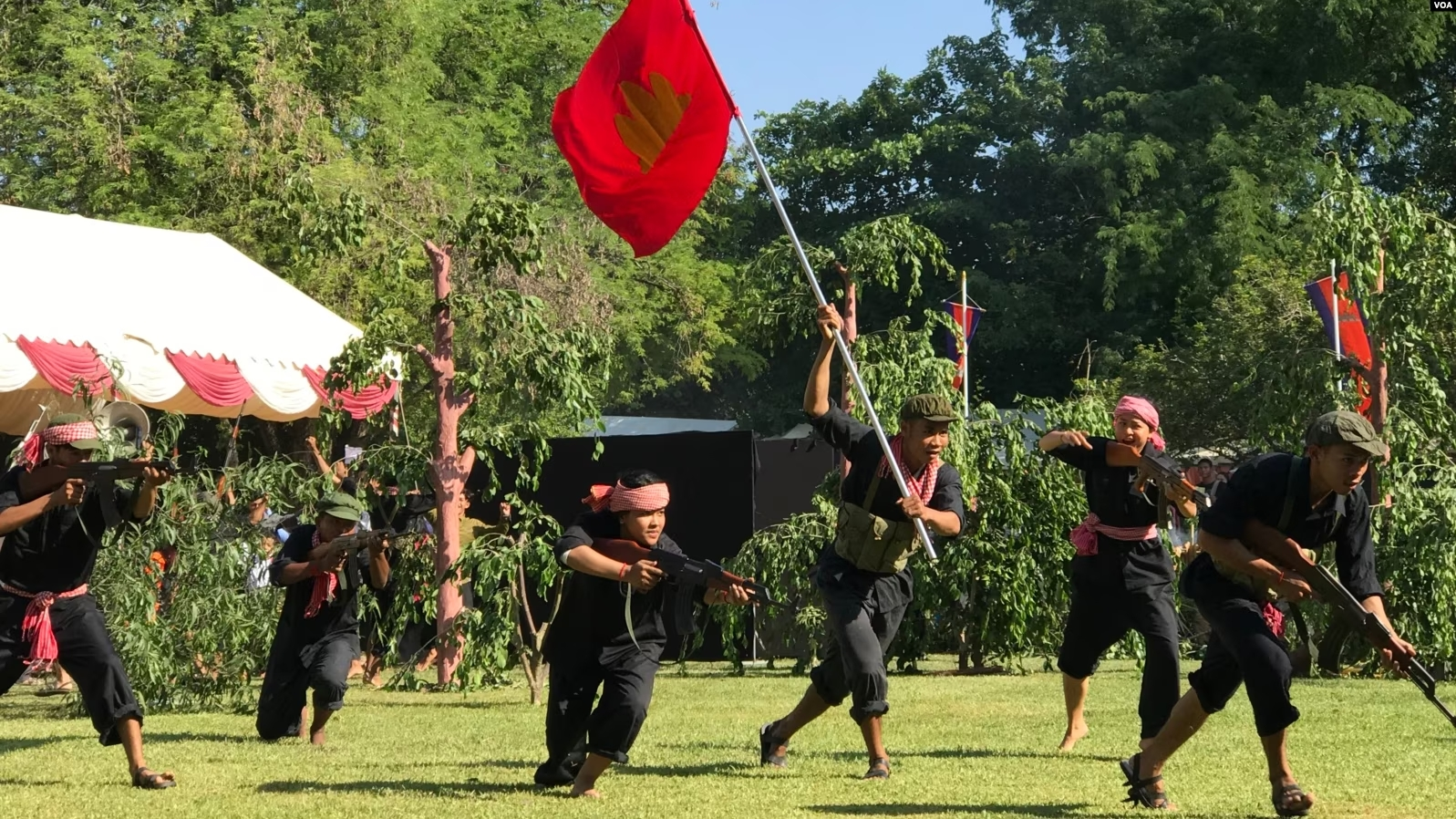
- Students from the Royal University of Fine Arts reenact Khmer Rouge crimes in an event marking the annual Day of Anger (Choeung Ek, 2019)
- Also called: Day of Tying Anger, Day of Hatred, Day of Anger
- Observed by: Cambodia
- Significance: Remembrance of the Cambodian Genocide
- Date: 20 May
- Frequency: annual
- First time: 1984

The National Day of Remembrance (Khmer: ទិវាជាតិនៃការចងចាំ, romanized: Tivea Cheate nei kar Changcham), formerly called the Day of Tying Anger (Note: In English, it is sometimes called 'Day of Hatred', which is somewhat of a mistranslation. The Khmer name, when instituted in 1983, was ទិវាចងកំហឹង (Ti Veer Jrong Komhuoeng, 'Day of Tying Anger'. The name could also be translated as 'Day of Maintaining Rage'.) (Khmer: ទិវាចងកំហឹង, romanized: Ti Veer Jrong Komhuoeng), which falls on 20 May, is an annual event in Cambodia. It commemorates the Cambodian genocide at the hands of the Khmer Rouge regime that ruled the country between 1975 and 1979. It became a national holiday in 2018.

== History ==
=== A National Day of Hatred after the fall of the Khmers Rouges ===
The 'National Day of Hatred' was first launched in the People's Republic of Kampuchea (PRK) on 20 May 1984. The commemoration was initiated by a 12 September 1983, conference in Phnom Penh of around 300 intellectuals and clergymen. The date was selected since it marked the beginning of mass killings in Democratic Kampuchea on 20 May 1975. It was also the date that the Khmer Rouge had initiated forced collectivization in southern Takéo in 1973.

In the PRK, the full title of the event was 'Day of Hatred against the genocidal Pol Pot-Ieng Sary-Khieu Samphan clique and the King Sihanouk-Son Sann reactionary groups'. The National Day of Hatred was an important holiday in the PRK, and the Kampuchean United Front for National Construction and Defense mobilized Kampuchean mass organizations to ensure popular participation.

In the PRK, the policies of the United States (dubbed as imperialist) and the People's Republic of China (dubbed as expansionist) were also targets of dislike during the Day of Hatred. The 1983 conference had formulated that the objective of the National Day of Hatred was to mobilize international public opinion against the Khmer Rouge, their allies and their foreign backers. In particular, the issue of the representation of the Coalition Government of Democratic Kampuchea in the United Nations was highlighted.

During the 1980s and 1990s, the National Day of Hatred was marked by fiery speeches and the burning of paper effigies of Pol Pot. During the PRK years, the National Day of Hatred represented one of very few spaces for victims of the Khmer Rouge to publicly discuss their experiences from the Democratic Kampuchea period. Also, the event provided an increased space for religious institutions (such as Buddhist temples) to hold functions.

=== A commemoration put on hold by the United Nations ===
During the UNTAC period, the National Day of Hatred was put on hiatus as the UN administration sought to involve the Khmer Rouge into the political process. Later in the 1990s, the day was revived. In 2001, the event was officially renamed 'Day of Remembrance'.

=== Return of a National Day of Remembrance ===
The National Day of Hatred is still marked in Cambodia, although the commemorations are of smaller scale today. Since the massive defections from the remaining Khmer Rouge guerrillas, the National Day of Hatred lost much of its prominence. Still commemorations are held, such as public theatre plays about the Khmer Rouge period. The Cambodian People's Party (the modern incarnation of the KPRP, the ruling party in the PRK) still conduct commemorations of the National Day of Hatred, often to remind Cambodians of the Khmer Rouge links from the 1980s of the contemporary opposition parties. The Phnom Penh municipality has instituted a tradition of arranging visits to the Choeung Ek fields, where Buddhist ceremonies are held.

== Hymn ==
Oh! Phnom Penh, a popular lament composed by Mam Bunnarai as he returned to Phnom Penh after three long years, was broadcast on loudspeakers in the 1980s, and has become an unofficial hymn for the National Day of Remembrance.
