= Cambodian Rocks =

Compilation album by various artists
- Released: 1996
- Recorded: 1960s–1970s
- Genres: Psychedelic rock, garage rock, psychedelic pop, romvong
- Length: 69:34
- Language: Khmer
- Label: Parallel World
- Compiler: Paul Wheeler

Cambodian Rocks is a compilation of 22 uncredited, untitled Cambodian psychedelic and garage rock songs from the late 1960s and early 1970s. When the tracks were recorded, musicians in the thriving music scene were combining Western rock and pop genres with their own styles and techniques. When the Khmer Rouge came to power in 1975, artists were among those viewed as a threat to the regime's agrarian socialist vision, and several of the performers on the album are believed to have been among those killed during the ensuing Cambodian genocide of 1975–1979. A great deal of information about them and their creative output was lost, although some has been recovered since the album's release.

The compilation was assembled from cassette tapes purchased by an American tourist in 1994 and released on the Parallel World label in 1996. The album has been lauded for its music as well as its historical and cultural significance, though the label has been criticized for reissuing it years later without working to identify those involved. Through collaboration on the Internet, the songs have all been identified. Cambodian Rocks inspired the 2015 documentary film Don't Think I've Forgotten.

== Historical context ==
In the years before the Khmer Rouge came to power in 1975, Cambodia had a flourishing music scene. Particularly in Phnom Penh, artists were combining traditional and native styles with those from the West.

The Khmer Rouge regime, led by Pol Pot, wanted to return the nation of Cambodia to an idyllic notion of the past by implementing a radical form of agrarian socialism while simultaneously shunning outside aid and influence. To build and protect their utopian goals, the regime perceived enmity in anyone tied to the previous Cambodian governments, ethnic and religious minorities, intellectuals, and members of certain professions. Artists posed a threat due to their own influence on culture, incompatibility with an agrarian lifestyle, or exhibiting foreign influence. Between 1975 and 1979, about 2 million people (25% of the country's population) were killed during the ensuing Cambodian genocide. Several of the artists on Cambodian Rocks are thought to have been among those killed, and information about them destroyed along with much of their creative output.

== Production ==
Yol Aularong – "Yuvajon Kouge Jet"
Sample of Yol Aularong's "Yuvajon Kouge Jet" (track 13)

Sinn Sisamouth – "Srolanh Srey Touch"
Sample of Sinn Sisamouth's "Srolanh Srey Touch" (track 05)

While a tourist in Cambodia in 1994, American Paul Wheeler became interested in music he had been hearing around Siem Reap. He purchased "about six tapes" of music from a market vendor and assembled a mixtape of his favorite tracks. His friend at the Parallel World label in New York City, upon hearing the mixtape, agreed to release 1,000 copies on vinyl. When they sold out, the label issued the much more widely known CD version, containing 22 songs instead of the original 13.

Several reviewers have likened the album to a bootleg. Neither Wheeler nor Parallel World provided any information about the artists or names of the tracks. When re-issued in 2003, reviewer Mack Hagood criticized Parallel World for reifying its bootleg status by retaining the anonymous track list rather than working to look for surviving artists or their families, who would likely benefit greatly from royalties. (Note: Cambodia had only just passed its first copyright law in 2003, allowing families to claim the artists' intellectual property for the first time. In 2014, Sinn Sisamouth's family provided proof of composition and was awarded ownership of copyright over 180 songs. The event was commemorated with a celebration and tribute concert.) With information more widely available on the Internet and the opportunity to collaborate, all tracks have since been identified.

The cover art since the first release has been a charcoal rubbing taken from one of the bas reliefs in the Angkor Wat temple.

== Musical style ==
The recordings reflect the influence of Western rock and pop music in general and that of the United States in particular due to its heavy involvement in Southeast Asia during the Vietnam War. The compilation is varied, combining a range of popular Western genres like garage, psychedelic, and surf rock, with Khmer vocal techniques, instrumental innovations, and the popular romvong "circle dance music" trend. Several reviews describe the uncanny quality of the songs using words like "mystery" and "familiarity", to help account for the album's wide appeal at the time of its release when such compilations were less common. Yol Aularong's "Yuvajon Kouge Jet", for example, has been noted as sounding like a "fuzzed-out, reverb-soaked" "go-go organ and fuzz-guitar" cover of Them's "Gloria". Reviewers also noted similarities between Sinn Sisamouth's "Srolanh Srey Touch" and Santana's cover of Fleetwood Mac's "Black Magic Woman". Other tracks have been likened to Booker T. & the M.G.'s and The Animals.

Several of the artists on Cambodian Rocks had been quite successful before the Khmer Rouge, while others achieved fame posthumously.

Sinn Sisamouth (c.1935-c.1976) was a prolific singer-songwriter with a crooning voice that has been likened to that of Nat King Cole. He got his start singing on the radio while in medical school in his early 20s, and was admitted to the Royal Treasury's classical ensemble, with whom he performed at state functions. By the late-1950s and early-1960s he was one of the most popular musicians in the country. As a solo artist in the 1960s he performed with a rock band rather than traditional wind instrument backing, experimenting with combining Khmer music with Western sounds. Sometimes called the "King of Khmer music", "the Cambodian Elvis", or the "golden voice", his lasting cultural impact is difficult to overstate. He is believed to have been killed by execution squad during the genocide in 1976, but his voice remains one of the country's most recognizable.

The "King of Khmer music" is credited with discovering "the queen of Cambodian rock 'n' roll", Ros Sereysothea, who had been singing at weddings. Coming from a poor rural background, she moved to Phnom Penh and found success singing on national radio. She was known for her take on traditional folk songs but increasingly incorporated Western genres and instrumentation, even issuing cover versions of a number of Western hits. Under the Khmer Rouge, she was allegedly forced to perform for political leaders and to marry a party official, though accounts of her fate differ and no specifics have been confirmed.

The other artists did not achieve the same degree of success as Sisamouth or Sereysothea, and even less information about them survives. The Sydney Morning Herald called Pan Ron "the most risque of Cambodian singers of the 1960s to mid-1970s [who] hopped genres from traditional Khmer music to covers or localised takes on western rock, twist, cha cha, mambo, jazz and folk." According to an unconfirmed account, she died sometime after the 1978 Vietnamese invasion of Cambodia, probably killed by the Khmer Rouge. Yol Aularong was one of the subjects of the 2015 documentary Don't Think I've Forgotten. In a review of the film, The New York Times described him as "a charismatic proto-punk who mocked conformist society."

== Reception and legacy ==
The album has received praise for its musical content as well as historical and cultural significance. Rolling Stone called it "a marvel of cultural appropriation" and said it exhibits "all manner of virtuosity". Far East Audio ascribed it the label "instant classic", while Allmusic said the album is "an incredible historical document of late-'60s to early-'70s Cambodian rock". Nick Hanover called it an "unpredictably playful" mix with "each track ... a continuous surprise, a fusion of elements that should be contradictory but somehow strike a balance of West and East – organ hooks swerving between fierce guitar riffs that antagonize vocals that frequently sound closer to ghostly siren wails than traditional pop melodies". The New York Times said the album and the circumstances of its release "established a lasting aura of mystery around the music".

Cambodian Rocks was the first release of its kind, followed by a number of similar compilations like Cambodian Cassette Archives and other unrelated titles by the same or similar names, inspired by the original or exploiting its weak standing with regard to intellectual property. It also gave rise, in part, to a broader trend of Western interest in obscure psychedelic and progressive rock from the rest of the world.

The California band Dengue Fever, known for its Khmer rock performances, has recorded a number of covers of tracks from Cambodian Rocks. Like Paul Wheeler, Dengue Fever founding member Ethan Holtzman discovered the 1960s–70s music while traveling in Cambodia and formed the band upon his return to California. The band's singer is Cambodian emigrant Chhom Nimol, who lived in a refugee camp in Thailand during the Khmer Rouge.

Filmmaker John Pirozzi received a copy of the album while in Cambodia filming City of Ghosts and began researching the stories of the artists. Eventually, he tracked down material to create Don't Think I've Forgotten, a 2015 documentary about pre-Khmer Rouge Cambodian music which takes its name from a Sinn Sisamouth song.

== Track listing ==
Cambodian Rocks includes 22 songs. Although the album provides no track information, fans and researchers have identified the artists and song names. The table below includes both the original romanized Khmer titles and English translations.

Number	Duration	Artist(s)	Original title (romanized Khmer)	English translation
1	4:31	Yol Aularong	"Jeas Cyclo"	"Riding a Cyclo"
2	3:50	Ros Sereysothea	"Chnam Oun Dop-Pram Muy"	"I'm 16"
3	2:14	Ros Sereysothea	"Tngai Neas Kyom Yam Sra"	"Today I Drink Wine"
4	2:12	Yol Aularong and Liev Tuk	"Sou Slarp Kroam Kombut Srey"	"Dying Under a Woman's Sword"
5	2:57	Sinn Sisamouth	"Srolanh Srey Touch"	"I Love Petite Girls"
6	2:34	Pan Ron	"Rom Jongvak Twist"	"Dance Twist"
7	3:14	Pan Ron	"Knyom Mun Sok Jet Te"	"I'm Unsatisfied"
8	3:23	Liev Tuk	"Rom Sue Sue"	"Dance Soul Soul"
9	3:23	Ros Sereysothea	"Jam 10 Kai Thiet"	"Wait 10 More Months"
10	3:36	Ros Sereysothea	"Jah Bong Ju Aim"	"Old Sour & Sweet"
11	1:54	Sinn Sisamouth, Ros Sereysothea, Pan Ron, and Dara Jamchan (composed by Voy Ho)	"Maok Pi Naok"	"Where Are You From?"
12	4:00	Sinn Sisamouth	"Phneit Oun Mean Evey"	"What Are Your Eyes Made Of?"
13	3:27	Yol Aularong	"Yuvajon Kouge Jet"	"Broken Hearted Man"
14	3:43	Meas Samon (composed by Mai Bun)	"Jol Dondeung Kone Key"	"Going to Get Engaged"
15	3:19	Ros Sereysothea	"Kerh Snae Kyoum Thai"	"Have You Seen My Boyfriend?"
16	3:22	Ros Sereysothea	"Chnang Jas Bai Chgn-ainj"	"Old Pot, Tasty Rice"
17	3:37	Ros Sereysothea and Dara Jamchan (composed by Voy Ho)	"Kone Oksok Nas Pa"	"We're Very Bored, Dad!"
18	3:19	Ros Sereysothea	"Kom Kung Twer Evey"	"Don't Be Mad"
19	3:11	Ros Sereysothea	"Penh Jet Thai Bong Mouy"	"I Like Only You"
20	2:20	Pan Ron and In Yeng	"Srolanh Srey Chnas"	"I Love Mean Girls"
21	2:07	Sinn Sisamouth, Meas Samon, and Yol Aularong (uncredited) (composed by Voy Ho)	"Komlos Teng Bey"	"Three Gentlemen"
22	3:21	Ros Sereysothea	"Retrey Yung Joup Knea"	"The Night We Met"

== See also ==
- Dance in Cambodia
- Music of Cambodia
- Traditional Cambodian musical instruments
- Cambodian rock (1960s–1970s)
