= Pou Vannary =

- Pou Vannary, c. 1974, from an archival photo used in the film Don't Think I've Forgotten.

Background information
- Origin: Cambodia
- Genres: Cambodian rock; Romvong; traditional Khmer; Bolero; Slow jam
- Occupations: Singer; songwriter; guitarist
- Instrument: Guitar
- Years active: 1969-1975
- Labels: Apsara; Hanuman; Pous Meas; Thas Meas
- Website: www.thecvma.org/singers

Pou Vannary (Note: Khmer: ពៅ វណ្ណារី, romanized: Poĕu Vănnari; Khmer pronunciation: [pɨw ʋan.naː.riː]) (fl. 1970s) was a Cambodian singer active in the early 1970s. She was one of many Cambodian musicians believed to have perished during the Khmer Rouge regime starting in 1975.

== History ==
Little is known of Pou Vannary’s early life. However, her love for music began from memorizing tunes being broadcast on the radio or from records when she was very young. The beginnings of Vannary’s professional career began when Ghhuon Chhing Eam heard her singing at her home for fun, and invited her to join as a singer in his ensemble. Her mother is said to have been vehemently opposed to her singing career due to the stereotypes on female artists during that time. Vannary did not become well-known right away, however she trained and had guidance from popular composers such as Mok Chhuon, Nou Nhong, Mok Sivutha, and others who helped her develop her talent. Vannary debuted in 1969 at the biannual National Congress festival, Sinn Sisamouth was reportedly a judge during her participation at the festival.

After the 1970 Cambodian coup d’état, Vannary joined the Khmer Republic military under the 3rd Infantry Division’s orchestra. Although, she wasn’t involved with combat, instead she performed with her orchestra on the frontlines to bring entertainment to soldiers returning from combat. Vannary did not begin singing foreign songs until Mak Chhuon advised her to due to her relaxed vocals. Her favorite artists were The Carpenters, Carole King, and Tom Jones which she credited for influencing her style. While many of her records have been lost today, in a 1974 interview she mentioned some of her foreign covers included “You’ve Got A Friend”, “Beautiful Sunday”, “Yesterday Once More”, “Mother of Mine”, and “Without You” among many others that she helped adapt into Khmer.

Vannary still enjoyed performing Khmer style music such as traditional songs or romvong. For modern music she preferred slow tempos, boleros, and slow jams. Some of her most popular recordings of these styles are “យំអស់ទឹកភ្នែក” [Cried All My Tears] and “ទឹកហូរ” [Flowing Water]. She also recorded original foreign style songs such as “ចម្រៀងវិស្សមកាល” [Vacation Song]. Before recording sessions, she abstained from eating salty and spicy dishes as well as peanuts and carbonated drinks to maintain her vocal health and ability. Vannary often performed live for television and radio, with a preference for television performances. Vannary had a husband who was also a musician from that era, he is presumed to have died during the Khmer Rouge era. She had sung in the movie “Nous Deux” as known by its French title, a film which was produced by Kang Chak Film production. During afternoons, Vannary regularly performed at Club Diplomatiqué with the band Bayon.

Vannary was profiled in the 2015 documentary film on the history of Cambodian pop music, Don't Think I've Forgotten. According to research conducted for the film, Vannary was somewhat unusual among other female Cambodian pop singers of her time, due to her relaxed vocal style and ability to accompany herself on acoustic guitar in the mode of an American singer-songwriter. She could also speak English and specialized in translated versions of American/British pop songs. Her most widely-known recording is a cover of James Taylor’s "You've Got a Friend" (written by Carole King) titled “បងមានថ្មីទៀតហើយ” [You’ve Found Someone New Again], with Vannary singing in Khmer and English.

Like many of her contemporaries in Cambodian popular music, Vannary's career ended abruptly when the Khmer Rouge gained control of the country in April 1975 and forced city dwellers to become farm workers to fulfill their visions of agrarian socialism and the eradication of all foreign and western influences (including music) from Cambodian society. Vannary disappeared during the ensuing Cambodian genocide and her exact fate is unknown. Few of her recordings have survived due to the chaos of the Khmer Rouge regime. Her rendition of "You’ve Got a Friend" appeared on the soundtrack to Don't Think I've Forgotten in 2015, and a few more of her songs have appeared on compilations like the 2011 CD Cambodia Rock Spectacular! and Cambodia Rock Intensified!, both issued by Lion Productions.
