= Yol Aularong =

Cambodian musician

- Yol Aularong performing in the early 1970s, from archival footage used in the film Don't Think I've Forgotten

Background information
- Origin: Cambodia
- Genre: Cambodian rock
- Occupations: singer, guitarist
- Years active: 1960–1975

Yol Aularong (Note: Khmer: យស អូឡារាំង, romanized: Yôh Olarăng; Khmer pronunciation: [jɔːh oː.laː.raŋ]) was a Cambodian garage rock musician, and a leading figure in the country's rock scene of the 1960s and 70s. He incorporated elements of soul, funk, and rock into his music, and was known for his rebellious persona, humor, and social commentary. He is presumed to have been killed during the Cambodian genocide that took place under the Khmer Rouge between 1975 and 1979. Aularong received renewed attention with posthumous collections like Cambodian Rocks, the documentary Don't Think I've Forgotten, and the off-Broadway production Cambodian Rock Band.

== Biography ==
Yol Aularong was from a family of notable Cambodian musicians: singers Sieng Vanthy and Sieng Dy (aka Sieng Di) were his aunts, and classical violinist/composer Has Salan was his uncle. His father was a member of Cambodia's diplomatic corps and he spent some of his childhood in France.

Embarking on a music career, he stood out from the typical Cambodian pop music of the time by focusing on self-expression and social commentary. His public persona was that of a "bad boy" who flirted, sang sarcastic songs about everyday life, and claimed not to care about money or fame. The Guardian called him "a certifiable maniac" and The New York Times described him as "a charismatic proto-punk who mocked conformist society." The 2014 documentary film Don't Think I've Forgotten, which profiles Aularong, recounts an exchange between Aularong and Norodom Sirivudh in which he said "You're a prince, I'm not, but we will all die so who cares, let's have a drink."

As with many of his contemporaries, much of the information about Aularong's life, as well as his creative output, were lost during the Khmer Rouge regime. He was last seen shortly after the Khmer Rouge seized control in April 1975 and ordered all residents of Phnom Penh to evacuate the city. He left with his mother, but his fate is unclear. In an interview for Don't Think I've Forgotten, his aunt speculated he was likely killed. A member of the Cambodian royal family who knew Aularong explained that as a non-conformist musician with western influences, Aularong was likely targeted for imprisonment or execution immediately. Though what happened to him is uncertain, according to the Huffington Post, "his name survived as a sort of codeword for the younger Cambodians to identify themselves as a way of keeping their culture alive."

== Musical style ==
Yol Aularong - "Jeas Cyclo"
A sample of "Jeas Cyclo" from the Cambodian Rocks compilation

Aularong was regarded as an original artist, incorporating elements of soul, funk, and rock into his songs. He often performed with his aunt Vanthy and Pen Ran's younger sister, Pen Ram, as backing singers. His lyrics were often humorous or sarcastic, based on everyday life and current styles, even when singing about more serious subjects. According to Rebeat, his "subversive, satirical style and distorted psych guitar makes him the joker/rebel of the Cambodian rock scene." According to LinDa Saphan, "In the 1970s, Yol Aularong and Meas Samon were the only singers and songwriters who were making social commentary through their songs. [Aularong] used irony to comment on Cambodia's bourgeois conformist society."

== Legacy ==
Western audiences were introduced to Aularong's work through compilation releases many years later. Cambodian Rocks, released on the New York-based Parallel World label in 1996, contained 22 uncredited, untitled tracks of pre-Khmer Rouge psychedelic and garage rock music. In the years since its release, the tracks have been identified and three attributed to Aularong. The compilation drew attention to the novel sound of music produced by Aularong and his contemporaries, who combined popular Western genres like garage, psychedelic, and surf rock, with Khmer vocal techniques, instrumental innovations, and the popular romvong "circle dance music" trend. Reviewers likened his "Yuvajon Kouge Jet", for example, to a "fuzzed-out, reverb-soaked," "go-go organ and fuzz-guitar" cover of Them's "Gloria." Meanwhile, The Diplomat considered it "one of the most enduring pop hits of Cambodia's first period of independence." "Jeas Cyclo" is included in Lauren Yee's off-Broadway production, Cambodian Rock Band. Yee said it is "one of Cambodia's most enduring pop hits", and that she included it in the show after she named the show's fictional band "the Cyclos".

== See also ==
- Music of Cambodia
- Cambodian rock (1960s–1970s)
- Sinn Sisamouth
- Ros Serey Sothea
- Pen Ran
