= Don't Think I've Forgotten =

2014 American documentary film by John Pirozzi

Don't Think I've Forgotten: Cambodia's Lost Rock and Roll
- កុំស្មានបងភ្លេច ខ្មែរបាត់បង់តន្ត្រីរ៉ក់
- Directed by: John Pirozzi
- Produced by: John Pirozzi; Andrew Pope
- Edited by: Daniel Littlewood; Greg Wright; Matthew Prinzing
- Music by: Scot Stafford
- Distributed by: Argot Pictures
- Release date: October 11, 2014 (Festival du Nouveau Cinéma de Montréal)
- Running time: 105 minutes
- Country: United States
- Languages: English, Khmer, French

Don't Think I've Forgotten: Cambodia's Lost Rock and Roll is a 2014 documentary film directed by John Pirozzi about Cambodian rock music in the 1960s and 1970s, and the impact of the Khmer Rouge regime and Cambodian genocide on the local music scene. It received positive reviews from critics.

== Production ==
The idea for the film began when American filmmaker John Pirozzi was in Cambodia filming City of Ghosts. He was given a copy of the album Cambodian Rocks, a collection of untitled and uncredited music by artists presumed killed under the Khmer Rouge, and began researching the stories of the artists. Cambodian-born artist and sociology professor Linda Saphan acted as associate producer and lead researcher for the film. The film includes profiles of influential performers like Sinn Sisamouth, Ros Serey Sothea, Pen Ran, Baksey Cham Krong, Liev Tuk, Huoy Meas, Yol Aularong, Meas Samon, Pou Vannary, and several others (including Pen Ram, Pen Ran's sister), most of whom perished during the Khmer Rouge genocide, plus interviews with surviving performers like Sieng Vanthy, Mol Kamach, Mol Kagnol, and members of Drakkar. The film takes its title from a song by Sinn Sisamouth.

== Reception ==
On the review aggregator website Rotten Tomatoes, 100% of 23 critics' reviews are positive, with an average rating of 7.5/10. On Metacritic the film has a score of 79 out of 100 based on reviews from 8 critics, indicating "generally favorable" reviews. Film reviewer A.O. Scott of The New York Times mentions in short that, "Mr. Pirozzi's film is an unsparing and meticulous reckoning of the effects of tyranny on ordinary Cambodians. It is also a rich and defiant effort at recovery, showing that even the most murderous totalitarianism cannot fully erase the human drive for pleasure and self-expression."

== Soundtrack ==
Don't Think I've Forgotten

Soundtrack album by various artists
- Released: 12 May 2015
- Genre: Cambodian rock
- Label: Dust-to-Digital
- Producer: John Pirozzi

The soundtrack to Don't Think I've Forgotten, featuring full versions of several songs that appeared as snippets in the film, was released on 12 May 2015. Personnel at Dust-to-Digital helped locate original versions of the songs and remaster them for compact disc.

=== Track listing ===
Note: Blank entries below indicate unknown information. The song "There's Nothing to Be Ashamed Of" (track 8) by Pen Ran is also known as "Love Like Honey" on other compilation albums. Additional songs may have slightly different English titles in other compilations due to the difficulties of translation from their original Khmer titles. The song "Dying Under the Woman's Sword" (track 14) is credited on this soundtrack to Yol Aularong and Va Savoy, but on the Cambodian Rocks compilation it is credited to Aularong and Liev Tuk.

Number	Title	Performers(s)	Writers(s)	Year	Duration
1	"Phnom Penh"	The Royal University of Fine Arts	Norodom Sihanouk	1967	3:33
2	"Under the Sound of the Rain"	Sinn Sisamouth	Sinn Sisamouth		3:03
3	"The Story of My Love"	Chhuon Malay			3:10
4	"Unique Child"	Huoy Meas			4:54
5	"B.C.K."	Baksey Cham Krong	Mol Kagnol	1964	2:03
6	"Don't Be Angry"	Ros Serey Sothea			3:20
7	"Dance A Go Go"	Sinn Sisamouth	Sinn Sisamouth		2:52
8	"There's Nothing to Be Ashamed Of"	Pen Ran			3:01
9	"Full Moon"	Baksey Cham Krong	Mol Samel	1963	3:05
10	"Thevary My Love"	Sinn Sisamouth and Ros Serey Sothea		1972	3:36
11	"Heaven's Song"	Ros Serey Sothea	Mer Bun	1967	4:14
12	"Navy A Go Go"	Sinn Sisamouth	Sinn Sisamouth		2:48
13	"Console Me"	Sieng Vannthy	Voy Ho	1974	3:27
14	"Dying Under a Woman's Sword"	Yol Aularong and Va Savoy			2:11
15	"Crazy Loving You"	Drakkar	Drakkar	1974	5:14
16	"You've Got a Friend"	Pou Vannary	Carole King	1974	3:49
17	"Cyclo"	Yol Aularong		1974	4:36
18	"Old Pot Still Cooks Good Rice"	Ros Serey Sothea			3:22
19	"Don't Think I've Forgotten"	Sinn Sisamouth	Sinn Sisamouth	1974	3:30
20	"Oh! Phnom Penh"	Cheam Chansovannary	Keo Chenda		2:46
