= Zac Holtzman =

American guitarist

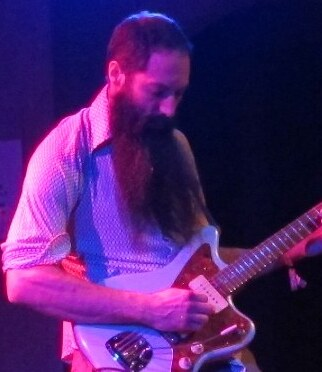
Zac Holtzman playing with Dengue Fever in 2012

Zac Holtzman is an American guitarist and co-founder of the band Dengue Fever. He also played Dr. San in the web series On Cinema, At The Cinema.

== Dieselhed ==
From 1989 to 2000 Holtzman was guitarist, co-vocalist, and co-songwriter for the group Dieselhed, a San Francisco-based rock band.

== Dengue Fever ==
Holtzman formed Dengue Fever in 2001 with his brother, Ethan Holtzman. In the 1990s Ethan became interested in Cambodian pop and rock through the compilation album Cambodian Rocks and eventually visited the country, returning with several cassette tapes he purchased there. Some time later, Ethan heard Zac listening to the same music and had an idea for a band based on the psychedelic, surf, garage rock and pop of pre-Khmer Rouge Cambodia.

== Other ventures ==
Holtzman plays Luther "Dr. San" Sanchez on the Adult Swim comedy web series On Cinema starring Tim Heidecker and Gregg Turkington.
