= Violon Sneha =

Violon Sneha (Khmer: វីយូឡុងស្នេហា) is a romantic ballad written by Khmer singer-songwriter Sinn Sisamouth which became a hit song on national radio in the mid-1950s. The violon melody was composed by violinist Hass Salan, and it catapulted Sisamouth into stardom across Cambodia.

This song was written before Sinn Sisamouth turned to more modern influences such as rock music, but it does reflect a certain influence through the use of the violin, a foreign instrument, not traditionally part of the Khmer orchestra.

The popularity of the song caused quite a stir among the elders of Cambodia, who saw the courteous dialogue of two lovers in the night, as outright scandalous and contrary to the traditional place of the woman as described in the Chbab Srey.

In recent years the song has been re-issued by a large number of modern performers. The original recording however is difficult to find nowadays as for many recordings of Sinn Sisamouth, whose records were often destroyed by the Khmer Rouges, critical of his Western influences and support for the Khmer Republic.
