= Champa Battambang =

Song composed by Sinn Sisamouth

Champa Battambang (ចំប៉ាបាត់ដំបង, "The Frangipani of Battambang”) is a popular Cambodian song composed and performed by Sinn Sisamouth that has become a notable part of Cambodian heritage.

== Translation ==
The title, which literally translates as “the frangipani of Battambang”, refers to a flower commonly found in Battambang, Cambodia.

== History ==
=== The Most Enduring Pre-Khmer Rouge Cambodian Song ===
Sinn Sisamouth's song Champa Battambang was released in 1962 on Wat Phnom Disques. According to an interview with Sisamouth in 1971, it was the first piece of content aired at the inauguration of the Royal Khmer Television in 1966. By the 1970s, it had become an important part of the repertoire of Cambodian pop and rock music. It was widely considered a classic. Khmer Rouge cadre Khieu Samphan recalled his friend Hou Yuon singing Champa Battambang nostalgically before the latter’s death in 1975.

=== In Refugee Camps ===
For the Khmer musicians who managed to escape the ruthless persecution of the Khmer Rouge—who forbade any foreign influence and almost every form of music apart from Khmer Rouge propaganda—the refugee camps in Thailand were a safe haven where listening to Champa Battambang and other pre-Khmer Rouge songs was a consolation in their desolation: "Khaodang was a dream encoded in music."

=== Uniting Generations ===
In 2012, Champa Battambang was said to be "one favourite amongst new musical students" in Phnom Penh.

Champa Battambang has become a Cambodian classic uniting several generations. It is the link that connects three generations in the 2018 Khmer drama In the Life of Music. The track was covered by Sin Setsochhata, the granddaughter of the "legendary Sin Sisamouth, perhaps Cambodia’s most celebrated singer from its pre-war period of cultural renaissance."

== Lyrics ==
Khmer	English translation
១-ឱ បាត់ដំបងបណ្តូលចិត្តអើយ ខ្ញុំសូមលាហើយ លាទាំងអាល័យ តាំងពីខ្លួនខ្ញុំបានឃ្លាតទៅឆ្ងាយ ខ្វល់ខ្វាយនឹកស្តាយ ពុំមានពេលល្ហែ ។	1- Oh Battambang, my heart of hearts, I said farewell, but still you bind me. So far from you, I live in regret, Caught in grief that won't let me go.
២- ឱ បាត់ដំបងកងកម្មវាសនា ដែលខ្ញុំប្រាថ្នា គ្មានពេលទំនេរ បើសិនជាគូ ខ្ញុំពីបុព្វេ សូមឱ្យមាសស្នេហ៍ នឹកឃើញគ្រាដើម ។	2- Oh Battambang, my fated companion, I've yearned for you—an endless ache. As we are joined in life's long storm, Tell me about the time we first met.
បន្ទរ- កន្លងយូរឆ្នាំចាំទេស្ងួន មានតែរូបអូនដែលជាដង្ហើម ចំពោះនួនល្អងចិត្តបងសង្ឃឹម សង្ឃឹមញញឹម ថាបានជាគូ វាសនា ។	Chorus - It's been many years, do you remember? You are as close as my skin, as my breath. I've hitched my dreams to your sweet face, Hoping that you are my destined one.
៣- ឱ!បាត់ដំបងខ្ញុំប៉ងយូរហើយ តើថ្ងៃណាឡើយ បានយល់ភក្ត្រា ចិត្តជ្រួលច្របល់រាល់ថ្ងៃខ្លោចផ្សារ ចង់បានចំប៉ាបាត់ដំបងអើយ ។ បញ្ចប់-ចង់បានចំប៉ាបាត់ដំបងអើយ...	3 - Oh Battambang, I've longed for you always. When will I see your face again? My heart's on fire, I am all undone, Longing for you, Champa of Battambang.
