= Oh! Phnom Penh =

"Oh! Phnom Penh" (Khmer: ឱ!ភ្នំពេញ) is a Cambodian song written by Mum Bunnaray in 1979 as the Khmers Rouges left Phnom Penh and its population returned to a devastated city. It has been recognized as "Cambodia's heritage protected forever".

== History ==
=== A smot for the fall of Phnom Penh ===
"Oh! Phnom Penh" came out just a few months after the Khmer Rouge regime (Democratic Kampuchea) collapsed and the populations that were starving in the countryside could come back to the city from which they had been chased three years before. The lyrics of "Oh! Phnom Penh" were written by Keo Chenda, who would later be Minister for Culture and Information and governor of Phnom Penh from 1982 to 1985. Keo Chenda also wrote the national anthem of the People's Republic of Kampuchea. The music of "Oh, Phnom Penh!" was composed by Catholic Khmer composer Mum Bunnaray, who was working at the national radio station in Phnom Penh. The latter asked his sister Mum Sokha to sing in the single. The song was recorded on January 3, 1979, in Kratie province and first broadcast on January 7, 1979. It was the first song to be broadcast after the fall of the Khmer Rouge regime. According to Khmer scholar Linda Saphan, "blasted throughout the countryside, the song spread a message of hope and return to normalcy and a desperate reminder that music lived on despite the terror of the genocide."

This sad song marked the beginning of a new life in the field of art, culture and other fields in Cambodia, and is one among a series of songs that have helped to serve the memory of the Cambodian people until now, to heal the wounds left from the Khmer Rouge.

=== A deep song on an ideological divide after the return of monarchy ===
The use of the song, as well as the celebration of the liberation of 7 January, was controversial in the 1990s when the political parties were reunified. In the late 1990s, the song returned and was heard on public media.

=== Becoming Cambodia's heritage protected forever ===
In 2011, a controversy arose as Cambodian pop singers attempted to make a cover of the song while changing its lyrics. The move was sensitive and seen as offensive for a generation which still suffered greatly from this trauma. It was also revealing of a generation gap between a generation of parents who survived the war and children who have only suffered from its consequences. While this decision was not understood by foreign media seeing a media ban rather than the result of a national trauma, Minister Khieu Kanharith said in his letter condemning the cover of this historical landmark song that:

The meaning of the song called Or Phnom Penh Euy expresses fully enough the sufferings of the Cambodian people in the Pol Pot regime; the standing up of the patriots to save the nation; the creation of the Kampuchea United Front for National Salvation on December 2, 1978; and the great victory on January 7, 1979, when the nation was liberated and the people met each other again.

— Khieu Kanharith, Minister of Information of the Royal Government of Cambodia

Today, "Oh! Phnom Penh" has become a colloquial form of lament on the state of the city of Phnom Penh, which stills suffers from the wounds and chaos left from the war, despite significant private and public investments.

== Composition ==
The title of "Oh! Phnom Penh" echoes, as a palinode, the first words "Oh! Battambang" of the Cambodian rock classic "Champa Battambang", and the difference of tone and content between the two songs reflects the dramatic shift from the joie de vivre of the Sangkum to the devastation of Year Zero. The melody of the song is monodic and follows the lines of the Cambodian lament of smot creating an effect of nostalgia and sadness on the heart of Khmer people.

== Lyrics ==
Khmer version
ឱ!ភ្នំពេញ អើយបីឆ្នាំនឹកអ្នក គ្មានស្បើយក្នុងឱរ៉ាខ្ញុំឃ្លាតពីអ្នក ចិត្តខ្ញុំខ្លោចផ្សាខ្មាំងផ្តាច់ចេតនា អ្នកហើយនឹងខ្ញុំខ្ញុំឃ្លាតអ្នកចេញទៅឱរ៉ាឆួលក្តៅ សំដៅសងសឹកជូនអ្នក ស បញ្ជាក់នៃក្តីចិត្តខ្ញុំភ្នំពេញ ដួងព្រលឹងជាទីស្នេហាបីឆ្នាំខ្លោចផ្សា តែអ្នករក្សាបានប្រវត្តិ ថ្លៃថ្លាអង់អាចក្លាហានអ្នកដំណាងឲ្យបាន ដួងព្រលឹងខ្មែរធ្លាប់មានប្រវត្តិ ល្បីល្បាញក្នុងលោកដែរព្រលឹងជាតិខ្មែរ ស្ថិតស្ថេរគង់វង់ជ្រកក្រោមម្លប់ទង់ ប្រាសាទអង្គរ អើយស្ថិតស្ថេរគង់វង់ជ្រកក្រោមម្លប់ទង់ប្រាសាទអង្គរ អើយឱ! ភ្នំពេញអើយខ្ញុំជួបអ្នកវិញហើយទុក្ខសោកអ្នកបានស្បើយឱ! ដួងព្រលឹងអើយភ្នំពេញអើយអើយ ភ្នំពេញអើយ
English translation

Oh! Phnom Penh
3 years I've missed you
without a moment of ease
I've parted from you with unbearable pain
The enemy has intended to cut off our bond
As I was forced to leave you
My heart was inflamed with anger
Seeking revenge
In evidence to prove my loyalty to you
Phnom Penh, the heart and soul of Cambodia
3 years you had endured
Yet you were still able to stand strong
Preserving a rich history of bravery
Bestowed upon the Cambodian soul
With a history once well known around the world
The soul of the Cambodian nation lives on
Descendants living under the shadows of Angkor
You continue to live on
Oh! Penh, Penh, I meet you once again
Your pain is now at ease
Oh, the heart and soul of Cambodia!
Oh! Phnom Penh!
