= LinDa Saphan =

Cambodian artist and social anthropologist (born 1975)

- Born: 1975 (age 50–51); Phnom Penh, Cambodia
- Education: Paris Nanterre University (PhD)
- Occupations: Artist; social anthropologist
- Spouse: John Pirozzi
- Children: 1

LinDa Saphan (born 1975) is a Cambodian artist and social anthropologist. Born in Phnom Penh, she grew up in Canada and graduated in France. She has supported women artists from Cambodia, co-organizing the first Visual Arts Open festival celebrating Cambodian artists in 2005. Her recent art work had included textiles and embroidery. As an academic, she is currently assistant professor of sociology at Paris Nanterre University.

== Biography ==
Born in Phnom Penh in 1975, she and her mother sought refuge in Canada in 1982 after the Khmer Rouge regime. Brought up in Montreal, she was made to feel an outsider as the only Asian and Protestant student in the high school she attended.

In 2005, together with Sopheap Pich and Erin Gleeson, Saphan organized the Visual Arts Open festival and art exhibition at the New Art Gallery in Phnom Penh, presenting 19 contemporary artists. The exhibition was considered to represent an important turning point in the recent history of Cambodian art. It presented works from a wide variety of artists. Two were elderly gentlemen: Van Nath (who had survived imprisonment in the Khmer Rouge Tuol Sleng jail) and Svay Ken who presented still lifes of everyday things. The younger generation from the 1970s was represented by Leang Seckon, who attended at the Royal Academy of Fine Arts, and the exhibition organizers Saphan and Sopheap Pich. The latter, both refugees, were educated in Canada, the United States and France.

Representing the returning diaspora, Saphan exhibited a series inspired by Cambodian sign art. It consists of national celebrities whose faces are repainted in white, reflecting their innate beauty. She also presented a wooden box filled with pods of rice seed arranged to depict 1970, the year when the Americans began to bomb Cambodia. Each pod displays a photograph of someone framed in white paint, the Buddhist colour of mourning. Visual Arts Open turned out to be a resounding success. After running for three weeks in Phnom Penh, the exhibition travelled to weekend venues around the city, including galleries, restaurants and stores. It was attended by hundreds of visitors and the artists themselves were able to sell their works for a total of more than US$15,000.

In 2006, Saphan set up the Selapak Neari programme which encouraged young artists to collaborate and exhibit their works. In particular, her efforts have assisted women artists throughout Cambodia.

Saphan completed her studies in sociology and anthropology with a Ph.D. from Paris Nanterre University in 2007. It resulted from her thesis " Renaissance des espaces publics à Phnom Pénh : processus d'appropriations urbaines et dynamiques de la citadinité des nouveaux habitants de la capitale cambodgienne" (Rebirth of public spaces in Phnom Penh: urban appropriations processes, dynamics of the new inhabitants of the Cambodian capital).

While she was working on her thesis in Cambodia, Saphan met the Italian director John Pirozzi who was working on his film Don't Think I've Forgotten. It celebrated Phnom Penh's golden age and she helped him to research the city's history and its earlier communities. The two married and had a daughter, Sothea, in 2010.

In 2011, Saphan once again exhibited in Phnom Penh, presenting 21 drawings at the Bophana Centre under the title "Black is Black".
