= Pen Ran =

Cambodian singer (c. 1944–c. 1979)

Pen Ran ប៉ែន រ៉ន
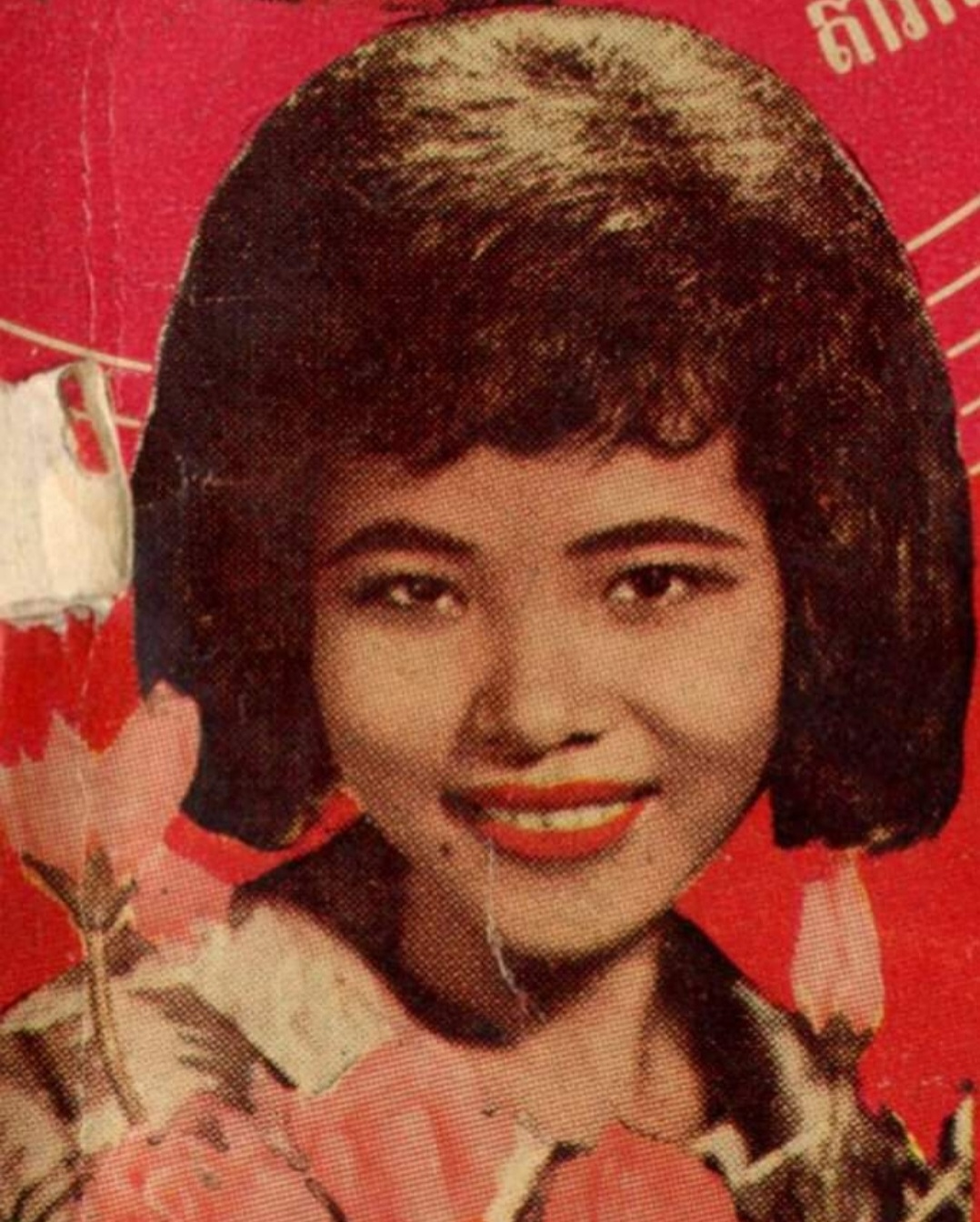
- Pen Ran c. 1968

Background information
- Born: c. 1944; Battambang, Cambodia, French Indochina
- Died: c. 1978-1979 (aged 34–35) Trapeang Sab Commune, Democratic Kampuchea
- Years active: 1963–1975

Pen Ran (Note: Khmer: ប៉ែន រ៉ន, romanized: Paen Rân; [paen rɑːn]) (c. 1944 – c. 1979) was a Cambodian singer and songwriter who was at the height of her popularity in the 1960s and early 1970s. Known particularly for her western rock and soul influences, flirtatious dancing, and risqué lyrics, Pen Ran has been described by The New York Times as a "worldly, wise-cracking foil" to the more restrained Cambodian pop singers of her era. She disappeared during the Khmer Rouge genocide and her fate is unknown.

== Life and career ==
Very little is known of Pen Ran's personal history. It has been established that she was from Battambang in northwestern Cambodia and attended the same school as the younger Ros Serey Sothea, another popular singer of the same era. Pen Ran had a sister named Pen Ram who was also a singer in the later years of the Cambodian psychedelic rock scene.

In the 1960s, Cambodian Head of State Norodom Sihanouk, a musician himself, encouraged the development of popular music in Cambodia. Initially, pop records from France and Latin America were imported into the country and became popular, inspiring a flourishing pop music scene based in Phnom Penh and led by singers like Sinn Sisamouth. Pen Ran was an early entrant in this music scene, with the hit song "Phka Kabah" (ផ្កាកប្បាស, 'Cotton Flower') in 1963, but she became a national star when she began recording with Sinn in 1966. Starting in the late 1960s Ran recorded many collaborations with Sisamouth and other notable Cambodian singers of the period, while continuing her solo career. The debut of the popular Ros Serey Sothea in 1967 had little effect on Pen Ran's career and perhaps even broadened her popularity as the second leading lady of Cambodian popular music.

== Style and legacy ==
Pan Ron – Rom Jongvak Twist
Sample of Pan Ron's Rom Jongvak Twist (from the 1996 compilation Cambodian Rocks)

Pan Ron – Knyom Mun Sok Jet Te
Sample of Pan Ron's "Knyom Mun Sok Jet Te" (from the 1996 compilation Cambodian Rocks). The song, whose title translates to "I'm Unsatisfied," is an example of sexuality in Pen Ran's lyrics that was unusual for the time.

Pen Ran was known for her unrestrained personality and western-oriented hairstyles and fashions, rejecting traditional demands on Khmer women and representing new and modern gender roles. Her onstage dancing and flirtatious lyrics were considered scandalous in Cambodia at the time. Her songs indicate her risque focus on romance and sexuality; like "Knyom Mun Sok Jet Te" (I'm Unsatisfed) and "Chongban Kour Sne" (I Want To Be Your Lover) and a rejection of traditional courtship; for example, "It's Too Late Old Man". Near the end of her music career Pen Ran was still an unmarried career woman in her early thirties, which was also unusual for Cambodia at the time. She addressed this topic in the song "Chnam Oun 31" (meaning I Am 31) which was an answer to Ros Serey Sothea's hit song "Chnam Oun 16" (I Am 16).

Pen Ran was known to be a very versatile singer, having a repertoire consisting of traditional Cambodian music, rock, twist, cha cha cha, agogo, mambo, madizon, jazz, and folk. When discussing her vocal abilities, one researcher has said "Pen Ran hits notes that shatter glass." Decades later, Nick Hanover described the unique combination of Cambodian and Western influences in the track "Rom Jongvak Twist" as "a Cambodian spin on American dance crazes that sounds less like Chubby Checker than Lydia Lunch." Throughout her career, she is believed to have performed on hundreds of songs, many of which she wrote herself.

Pen Ran disappeared during the Khmer Rouge genocide of the late 1970s and her exact fate is unknown. Her younger sister Pen Ram said that she survived until the Vietnamese invasion of late 1978/early 1979 when the Khmer Rouge launched their final series of mass executions. Given the goal of the Khmer Rouge to remove foreign influences from Cambodian society, Pen Ran's individuality probably ensured her death. In a 2015 BBC documentary on the band Cambodian Space Project, who have covered many of Pen Ran's songs, it was alleged by an interview subject that she was tricked by the Khmer Rouge into performing one of her songs, after which she was led away and executed.

Starting in the late 1990s, interest in Pan Ron's music was revived by the album Cambodian Rocks and similar CD compilations, while the documentary film Don't Think I've Forgotten described her as one of the most influential artists of her era, as well as one of the most popular artists amongst younger Cambodians.

== Discography ==
Some of the songs (from the hundreds) that she actually composed and sang herself or with Sinn Sisamouth or Ros Serey Sothea include:

=== Solo performances ===
- Bondam Tunle Boun Mouk
- Bong Kom Pruoy/"Don't Worry Darling"
- Chan Penh Boromey
- Cherng Mek Por Kmao
- Chnam Oun 31
- Chongban Kour Sne/"I Want To Be Your Lover"
- Chong Nov Ler Mek
- Chrolom Pdey Keh
- Enjurng Lerng Rom (Cover of Well All Right by Santana)
- Giant Woman
- Jombang Jet/"Heart in Despair"
- Jom Nor Trocheak
- Juob Ter Bros Kbot
- Kam Peah
- Kanya 80 Kilo
- Kdao Tngai Min Smoe Kdao Chit
- Ke Kramom Tha Ke Chasa
- Kmom Na Min Tech
- Kom Veacha Tha Sneha Knom (cover of Bang Bang by Nancy Sinatra)
- Komlos Chres Chab
- Komlos Lan Krahorm
- Konlong Pnhei Khluon
- Koun K'teuy/"Baby Ladyboy"
- Memeay Sabay Chet
- Mini A Go-Go
- Mini Samput Khaech/"Mini Skirt"
- Memay Bei Dong/"Widowed Thrice"
- Meta Oun Pong
- Min Jong Skoal Teh Kdey Snaeha
- Mjas Chenda
- Mtay Kaun
- Oh Pleang Euy
- Oun Deung/"I Know"
- Oun Rongea Dol Ch'eung Knong/"Chills to my Spine"
- Oun Skol Chet Bong Srey
- Oun Trov Ka Bong/"I Need You"
- Pdey Khmeng/"Young Husband"
- Phaem Nas Sneha/"Sweet Love"
- Pka Kabas
- Pka Sondun
- Preah Paey Popok
- Pros Chang Reiy
- Pros Reang Yeh Yeh/Ya Ya Men
- Puos Vek Sork Sroka
- Reaksmey Preah Sorya
- Reatrey Nov Pailin
- Rom Ago Ago/Rom Ton Kloun Nov Kmeng
- Rom Jongvak Twist
- Rom Min Chaet Te
- Rom Som Leis Keh
- Sabay Avey Mles
- Sday Chit Del Sralanh
- Sein Kmas Keh
- Sneh Krom Mlob Chhrey
- Somleng Kmous Kah
- Sour Ey Sour Jos
- Srolanh Bong Dol Ch'eung
- Sromai Jea Nich
- Sva Rom Monkiss/"Monkey Dance"
- Tom Gomsang Jenda
- Tngai Na Bong Tomner
- Tngai Nis Min Jol Pteas Te/"Not Going Home Today"
- Tgnai Nis Reabka Knyom
- Tngai Sonrak
- Tonsa Mok Pi Na
- Veal Smoa Khiev Kchey
- When Will You Be Free
- Yulyuom Rhok Sene
- Yuop Nih Oun Throv Ka Bong

=== Duets with Sinn Sisamouth and other artists ===
- Somphor Chan Kreufa (Pan Ron & Sisamouth)
- Kaal Na Pka Reek
- Kuu Nep Nit
- Ahnet Oun Phorng Pdei Euy (Pan Ron & Eng Nary)
- Bondaet Kbone Laeng (Pan Ron & Sisamouth )
- Brorjum Knea Rom Sabay (Pan Ron)
- Cer Chaet Chol Chnam (Pan Ron & Sisamouth)
- Deing Eiy Teh Bong (Pan Ron & Meas Samon)
- Jole Jroke Sin Nean (Pan Ron & Sisamouth)
- Kromom Tang Bey (Pan Ron, Ros Sereysothea & Huoy Meas)
- Lit Ondat Chea Bakse (Pan Ron & Eng Nary)
- PasDai Ban Heiy (Pan Ron & Sisamouth)
- Sahao Bomput Dot Manoos Tieng Ruos
- Smak Bong Lan Tmey
- Smak Oun Mouy (Pan Ron, Sereysothea & Sisamouth)
- Snea Douch Jeung Meik (Pan Ron & Sisamouth)
- Soom Gneak Mok Niss (Pan Ron, Sereysothea & Sisamouth)
- Srey Chnas Bros Chnerm (Pan Ron & Sisamouth)
- Chamrieng No Ning Pich (Pan Ron & Eng Nary)
- Srey Sross Somross Kmean Ptum (1963)
- Srorlanh Srey Chnas (Pan Ron & In Yeng)
- Tgnai Jey Nak Phnom (Pan Ron & Tet Somnang)
- Tov Surprise Mdong (Pan Ron & Sereysothea)
- Trov Bong Sleak Kbin (Pan Ron & Sisamouth)
- Sra Em Phalla (Pan Ron & Sisamouth)
- Kamsan Kungkea (Pan Ron & Sisamouth)
- Pnhaeu Samnieng (Pan Ron & Kong Phano)
