= Romvong =

Southeast Asian dance

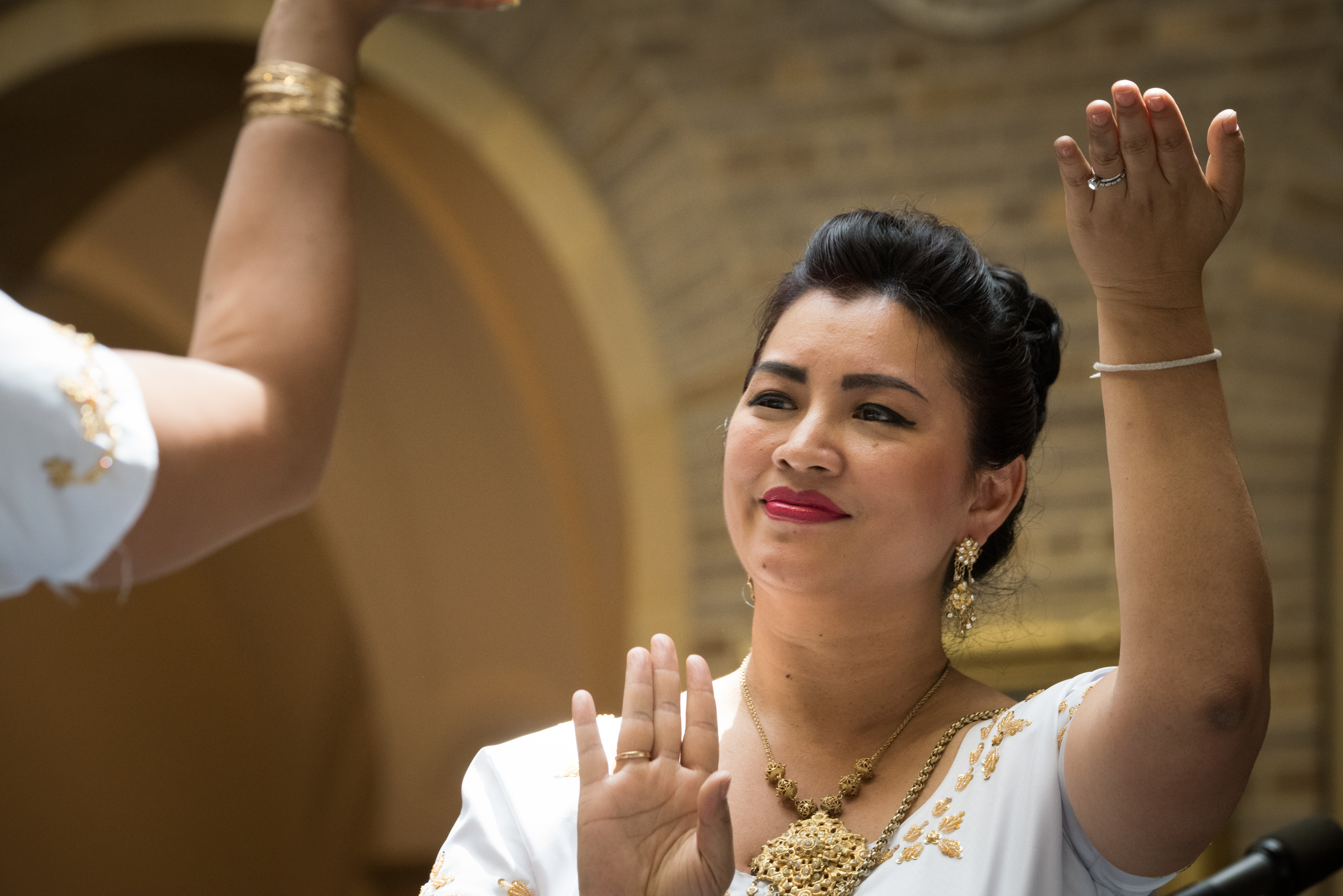
Hand gestures associated with Romvong

Romvong (Khmer: រាំវង់, romanized: Roămvǒng, Lamvong (Lao: ລຳວົງ - pronounced [lám.wóŋ]) or Ramwong (Thai: รำวง; RTGS: ram wong; Tai Lue: ᩃ᪁ ᩴᩅ ᩫ ᩬ; Tai Khun: ᨽ᩠ᨿᨦᨴᩱ᩠ᨿᩃᩨᩢ; pronounced [rām.wōŋ]; Shan: လမ်းဝူင်), Rambung (Malay: رمبوڠ), Vietnamese: lăm-vông) is a type of Southeast Asian dance where both men and women dance in a circle. It is a popular folk-dance in Cambodia, Laos, Malaysia, Xishuangbanna (China), and Thailand. It is a slow round dance continuously moving in a circular manner, and incorporates graceful hand movements and simple footwork. Both men and women participate in the same circle.

The circular dance style is claimed as a traditional dance in the four countries of the region where it is often part of traditional festivities, popular celebrations and modern parties. In addition to the dominant Khmer, Lao, Malay and Thai cultures, romvong is also common among many other groups indigenous to Southeast Asia. In Cambodia, for example, Ramvong dance is also found among ethnic groups including the Bunong, Krung, Tampuan and Brao people.

== Etymology ==
Romvong, sometimes transliterated as ramvong, is from the Khmer word រាំវង់ (IPA: [rŏəm ʋŏəŋ]). In Khmer, the word consists of two separate native Khmer morphemes រាំ (rom: "dance") and វង់ (vong: "circle"). The words were borrowed into both Thai (รำ, ram; วง, wong) and Lao (ລຳ, lam; ວົງ, wong) with the same meanings and pronounced according to phonology of the respective languages.

== History ==
Romvong is very popular among other Mon-Khmer indigenous people known as Khmer Loeu. All ethnic Khmers including Khmer Kandal (Cambodia), Northern Khmer (Thailand), and Khmer Krom (Southern Vietnam) as well as other Mon-Khmer tribes used the same word "roamvong" for this type of dance as a unified Khmer identity.

The indigenous Mon-Khmer minority known as Khmer Loeu, who live in higher altitude land areas of Northeastern Cambodia and other mountainous region in mainland Southeast Asia, popularly dance circling the campfire at night. This dancing (romvong) dates for millennia. In the Leang Arak rituals or Lerng Nak Ta which was the original Khmer tradition before Hinduism and Buddhism introduced to ancient Cambodia, small shrines were built surrounded with religious fence, where the spiritual women dance around the shrine. Then romvong become more popular for the locals dancing for entertainment and celebrations.

Romvong was probably performed by the Khmer locals during New Year celebration and festivities during Khmer Empire, and later on adopted by other Tai settlers, the ancestor of modern Thais and Laos when settling in Khmer Empire territories, based on the writer's opinion.

== Description ==
The basic pattern involves two couples folding their palms, with their fingers at right angles to their wrists, and bringing the hands up from behind the body to in front of the face, straightening and bending the fingers in time to the music throughout. The hands move in opposition directions, one to the left and one to the right.

The legs must move in time of the rhythm, and in the opposite direction of the partner. Dancers continue around in a circle, keeping in time with the beat of the drum. There is often a decorated pole or a vase of flowers used to mark the center of the circle.

== Importance in Cambodia ==
As Romvong originated from Khmer pre-historical tradition, this type of folk dance is very popular in Cambodia as this type of slow dance is regarded as Khmer national identity and local folklore.

Romvong is the most popular folk dance perform by both men and women across Cambodia especially in the New Year Eve, national and religious celebrations, and occasional events. Khmer people performs romvong for entertainment, releasing stress, and happiness. This type of dance is easily learned and perform, that's why most Khmer people regardless of social status know how to perform it. Moreover, Romvong songs are very popular among Khmer people sing during Khmer New Year (Sankrata), and other festivities especially during local celebrations.

== Importance in Laos ==
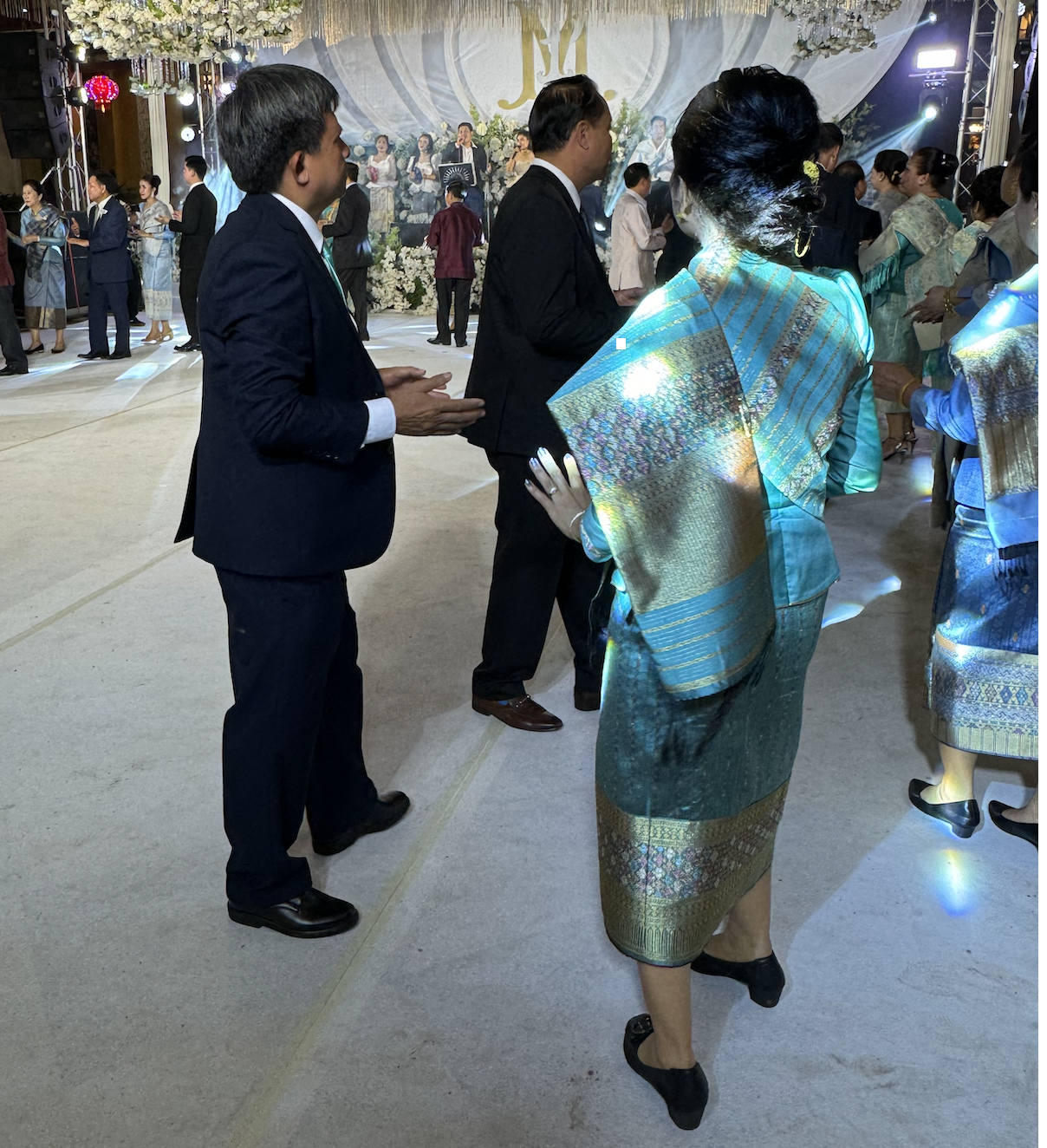
Lamvonglao dance during a Lao wedding ceremony in Vientiane, Laos

In Laos, romvong is known as lamvong or lamvonglao that is believed to have been part of the culture of Laos since ancient time. Lamvonglao is usually performed during several special occasions such as weddings, festivals, ceremonies, or guest welcoming. Today's fine stylistic lamvonglao dance originally evolved from a simple dance that villagers growing rice in paddy field would perform around a central bale of rice to celebrate harvest time. It is a slow revolving circle dance with the men forming an inner circle around an outer circle formed by the women, and the dance consists of eight movements per cycle. The cycles are repeated according to the length of the music. The beautiful arm and hand gestures are combined harmoniously with rhythmic musical instruments, such as khene, a Lao bamboo flute. As there are diverse ethnic groups living in various regions of Laos, there are many specific choreographic styles throughout the country, reflecting the richness of the Lao culture. For instance, there are lamvongs Salavane from Salavan province (southern Laos), Tangwaiy from Savannakhet province (central Laos), Sipandone from Champasak province, khabthoumlouangprabang from Luang Prabang province (northern Laos), and Mahaxay from Khammouane province (central Laos). These dances differ slightly in style, movement and music but are based on the national classical theme.

== Importance in Thailand ==
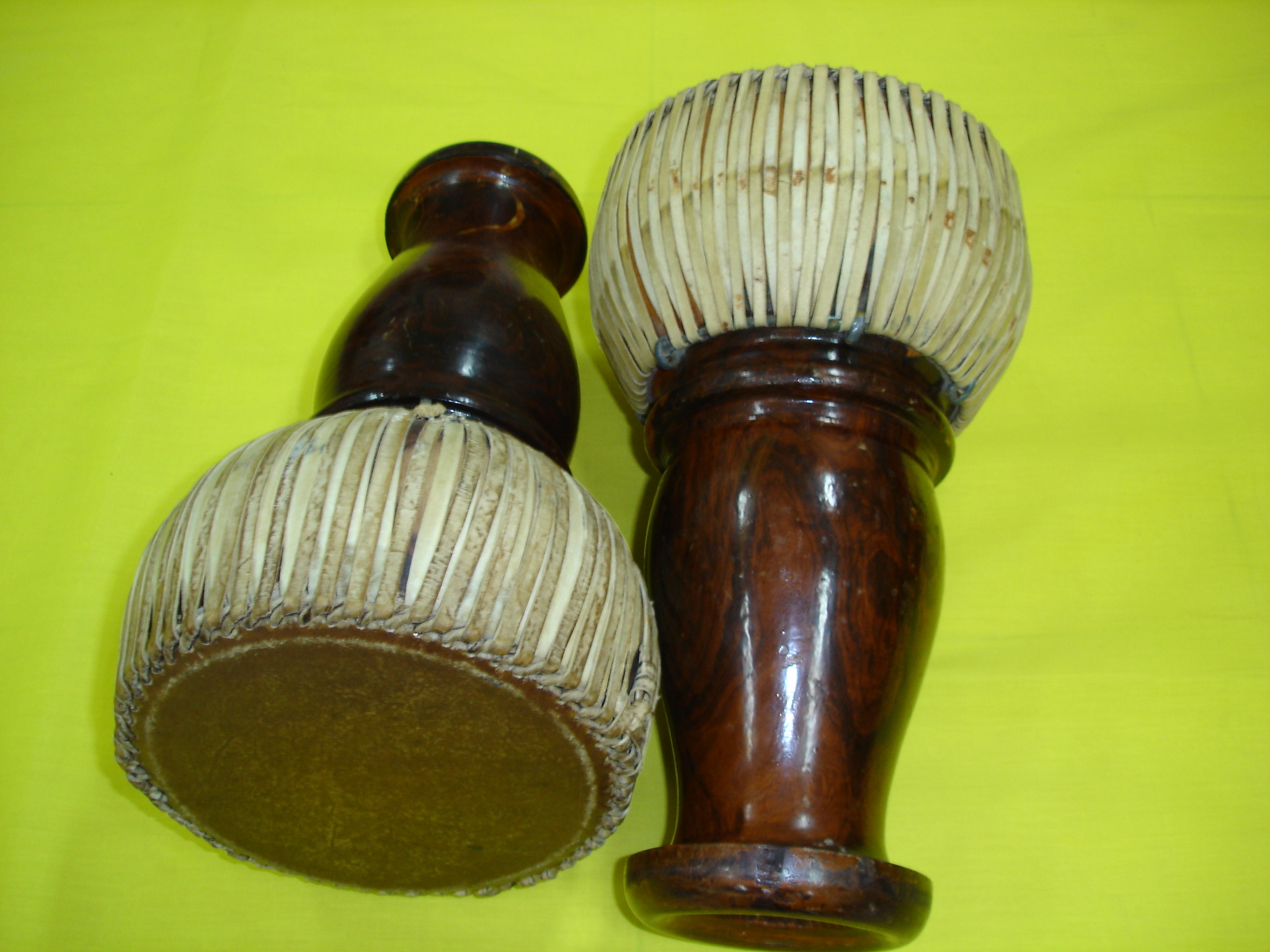
Thon was a drum used to mark the rhythm in ramthon, the dance that gave origin to ramvong.

In Thailand ramvong is deemed to have originated in ramthon (Thai: รำโทน), an older kind of folk dance where the rhythm was marked by a kind of drum known as thon (Thai: โทน). The Fine Arts Department of Thailand has identified over ten different styles of ramvong.

Ramvong was patronized by Prime Minister Plaek Phibunsongkhram during the hard times of Thailand in World War II. In order to help people to forget their penury, the military dictator encouraged Thai women and men to enjoy themselves by dancing ramvong. Also, as part of the policy of Thaification during his tenure, Phibunsongkhram aimed to stem the popularity of non-Thai dances such as the foxtrot or waltz through the promotion of ramvong. Even government officials were given half a day during the work week to dance ramvong together at their offices. After the end of World War II ramvong was largely replaced by luk thung and cha-cha-cha although its influence survived in Thai society.

== See also ==
- Khmer classical dance
- Dance of Cambodia
- Culture of Cambodia
- Dance in Thailand
- Dance and theatre of Laos
