= Sinn Sisamouth =

Cambodian musician (1932–c. 1976)

Sinn Sisamouth ស៊ីន ស៊ីសាមុត
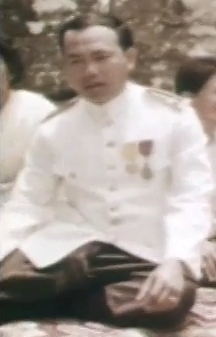
- Sisamouth in a film about the Royal Ballet of Cambodia (c. 1965)

Background information
- Born: Sinn Sisamouth - ស៊ីន ស៊ីសាមុត c. 1933; Stung Treng Province, Cambodia, French Indochina
- Died: c. 1976 (aged 42–43) Democratic Kampuchea
- Genres: Khmer pop; psychedelic rock; garage rock; traditional Khmer; romvong; saravann; jazz; bossanova; Afro-Latin; blues; cha cha cha; a go go; film
- Occupations: Singer; songwriter; composer; film director; actor
- Instruments: Guitar; mandolin; sralai; pey pok; chapei; tro
- Years active: 1951–1975
- Labels: Angkor; Apollo; Apsara; Bayon; Blue Star; Bokor; Cambodia; Chadomuk; Chanchhaya; Eagle; Hanuman; Indépendance; Lion; Mondol Dantrei; Monorom; Olympic; Phnom Penh; Phnom Pich; Sakura; Thas Meas; Wat-Phnom
- Publisher: Krouch Polin
- Website: www.thecvma.org/singers

Sinn Sisamouth (Note: /ˌsɪn ˈsiːsəmʊt/; Khmer: ស៊ីន ស៊ីសាមុត, romanized: Sin Sisamŭt, Khmer pronunciation: [siːn siː.saː.mut]) (c. 1933 – c. 1976) was a Cambodian singer-songwriter active from the 1950s to the 1970s. Widely considered the "King of Khmer Music", Sisamouth, along with Ros Serey Sothea, Pen Ran, Mao Sareth, and other Cambodian artists, was part of a thriving music scene in Phnom Penh that blended elements of Khmer traditional music with the sounds of rhythm and blues and rock and roll developing unique sounds. Sisamouth died during the Khmer Rouge regime under circumstances that are unclear.

== Early life ==
Sinn Sisamouth was born in Stueng Treng Province, the son of Sinn Leang and mother Seb Bunlei. One or both of Sisamouth's parents were partially Lao. Most sources list his year of birth as 1935, though some list 1932 or 1933. 23 August 1933 is generally accepted as his date of birth. Some people that had been alive during Sisamouth's era state that he was born during the Rooster zodiac, which includes the year 1933. Sisamouth's father was a soldier during the Colonial Cambodia period and also served as prison warden in Battambang Province. His father died when he was a child and his mother then remarried.

Sisamouth learned to play stringed instruments at the age of six or seven, and showed a natural singing talent. He was often invited to perform music at school functions. At about age 16 he graduated from primary school and moved to Phnom Penh to study medicine; this plan was apparently meant to please his parents when his true goal was to become a musician. He began composing his own songs around this time.

Sisamouth graduated from medical school around the time that Cambodia gained independence from France in 1953. He initially worked in a Phnom Penh hospital as a nurse, but was soon hired by the Cambodian national radio station as a singer with its band. Around this time, Sisamouth married his cousin Keo Thorng Gnu in an arranged marriage, and they eventually had four children.

== Music career ==
While performing with the Cambodian national radio station, Sisamouth became a protege of Queen Sisowath Kossamak, mother of Head of State Norodom Sihanouk. The Queen invited Sisamouth to join the Vong Phleng Preah Reach Troap (the classical ensemble of the Royal Treasury) with which he performed at royal receptions and state functions. He also achieved hit songs on national radio around this time, first writing and performing songs based on traditional Khmer music. In the mid-1950s, the romantic ballad "Violon Sneha", composed by violinist Hass Salan, catapulted Sisamouth into stardom across Cambodia.

Sisamouth became known for his crooning voice, which has been likened to that of Nat King Cole, while his stage presence has been compared to that of Frank Sinatra. By the late 1950s, Sisamouth had established himself as the leading figure in an expanding Cambodian pop music scene. Norodom Sihanouk, a musician himself, encouraged the development of popular music in Cambodia. Initially, pop records from France and Latin America were imported into the country and became popular, inspiring a flourishing music scene based in Phnom Penh.

The music produced by Sisamouth and his contemporaries had become popular throughout the country; in 1965, Sisamouth's song "Champa Battambang" was the first content played on Khmer Republic Television. By the late 1960s and early 1970s, the Cambodian music scene was further influenced by Western rock and roll and soul music via U.S. armed forces radio that had been broadcast into nearby South Vietnam. This resulted in a unique sound in which Western pop and rock were combined with Khmer vocal techniques. Sisamouth was a leader of these trends, moving from traditional Khmer music and romantic ballads to Latin jazz, cha cha cha, agogo, and eventually psychedelic rock in which he employed younger rock musicians. Sisamouth also made use of bossa nova and doo-wop influences.

Sisamouth had become established as Cambodia's most popular singer and songwriter. Nevertheless, his popularity did not eclipse that of other recording artists such as Eum Song Seurm and Huoy Meas. He collaborated directly with Mao Sareth and Chounn Malay, among others. He also wrote songs for, and duetted with, other popular Cambodian singers to nurture their careers. For example, starting in the mid-1960s he recorded many popular duets with Pen Ran.

Sisamouth is credited with launching the career of Ros Serey Sothea, who had been singing at weddings and later became the leading female singer in the Cambodian rock scene. Sisamouth and Sothea recorded many very popular duets from the mid-1960s into the early 1970s. In later years, Sisamouth contributed songs to the soundtracks for a number of popular Cambodian films, such as Orn Euy Srey Orn, Tep Sodachan, and Thavory Meas Bong.

Sisamouth's highly prolific songwriting became well known during this period; he is confirmed to have written more than one thousand songs for himself and others (see Sinn Sisamouth discography), and the true total may be considerably higher. His son Sinn Chanchhaya believed that Sisamouth wrote roughly one song for every day that he was a professional musician, a period of nearly 20 years. In 1973 the music publisher Kruorch Bunlyhe issued A Collection of Sentimental Songs, which contained 500 of Sinn Sisamouth's songs.

He was also known to adapt popular Western pop and rock songs with new Khmer lyrics, such as a song based on Santana's "Black Magic Woman" called "Srolanh Srey Touch" (translated as "I Love Petite Girls" in English-language compilations); plus covers of "Hey Jude" by The Beatles (titled "Always Will Hope"), "A Whiter Shade of Pale" by Procol Harum (titled "Apart from Love"), and "Love Potion No. 9" by The Searchers (titled "Other Than You"). By the 1970s he was working regularly with lyricist Voy Ho, and had adapted some traditional and popular Thai songs into his repertoire (for example, "Promden Jet" with Ros Serey Sothea).

After the establishment of the Khmer Republic in 1970, Sisamouth, along with other artists, was required to record patriotic songs supporting the Republic's stance against the Khmer Rouge insurgents.

== Personal life ==
Family members recall he spoke very little and had stage fright when performing in front of large crowds, often blanking. Gnu reports having to be at his performances to calm him down. He had a person installed in the stage wings to mouth words whenever he blanked. Furthermore, his neighbors recall barely seeing his face; in exaggeration, stating that one could blink after he pulled into his driveway and he’d already be inside his house.

In a 2014 interview with Keo Thorng Gnu, she stated that Sisamouth respected everyone regardless of their identity or background. Ros Serey Sothea told her sisters that he stood up for her when she got into a post-divorce altercation with Sos Math. Additionally in a 2006 documentary, his son Sinn Chanchhaya recalled.

One day, he got angry with me. I will remember it for my whole life. I beat up my brother. He was very angry and took a shoe to throw it at me. But he didn’t target me; he threw it somewhere else. That was his very special character. I will never forget in my whole life.

— Sinn Chanchhaya, 2006

=== Disappearance and death ===
Sinn Sisamouth died during the Khmer Rouge genocide and his exact fate has never been confirmed, with multiple sources making contradictory claims. Due to his ongoing popularity in Cambodia, there has been a great amount of speculation about his whereabouts after the Khmer Rouge forced the evacuation of all residents from Phnom Penh on April 17, 1975, and his apparent death at the hands of the new regime. In the film Don't Think I've Forgotten, Sieng Vanthy reported that she, Sisamouth, Yol Aularong, and all their family members were evacuated to the outskirts of Phnom Penh, and it was then that Sisamouth and Aularong were ordered to return to the city to work for the Khmer Rouge in some capacity. It is unknown if Sisamouth in fact followed this plan, and he may have been sent to a jail instead.

Also in Don't Think I've Forgotten, Sisamouth's son states that many different people have given him contradictory stories of his father's death. Like many of his contemporaries, as a popular musician with Western influences, qualities widely known to be disdained by the Khmer Rouge, Sisamouth was likely to have been targeted for imprisonment or execution immediately. A popular but apocryphal story claims that Sisamouth was about to be executed by a Khmer Rouge firing squad but requested the opportunity to sing one last song in an attempt to appeal to the soldiers' emotions, but they executed him anyhow.

In 2006, Khmer Apsara magazine granted a long interview to a government official and former Khmer Republic soldier named Keo Chamnab who claims to have seen Sisamouth's execution at a jail in Prek Ta Duong village in 1976.

Sisamouth looking very sad, told me that he was sent from Prek Eng, Kien Svay district, Kandal province, and he was jailed there for three days already. He did not commit any fault but he was accused by the Khmer Rouge as being an imperialist. It was difficult for Sinn Sisamouth to hide his identity and his face because he was a very famous singer dubbed the emperor (singer) of the country since long ago. Even if the Khmer Rouge did not accuse him of being a singer serving a regime which was a sworn enemy to that of the Khmer Rouge, he was also a soldier serving the former regime.

…

In the jail, we were forced to perform hard labor for 5 months. Then in November, I did not remember the exact day—around 5:30 PM—it was already late when 2 to 3 chhlobs [cadres] came in with a list to call the prisoners to be taken away (for execution) as usual. On that day, Bong Samouth’s name was called among the names of 4 or 5 other prisoners. He did not change his name and he was still known as Sinn Sisamouth. When his name was called, I was very distressed. I saw that his face was very sad and was ashened. Before he was escorted out, he hugged me but he did not leave any message for his family. He simply said, “I am leaving before you ph’oun (honorific for younger person), may you remain behind in peace”. I did not want to say much, I only replied to him, “Yes, bong (honorific for older person)”. His face was the face of a romantic person, he did not express anger nor unhappiness. While in jail, he only stared at the jail ceiling and looked at other prisoners, and shaking his head although no one knew why he did so. When he left the jail, he did not sing nor hum any tune as some would later claim.

— Keo Chamnab, 2006

Remaining family members believe Keo Chamnab’s claim as the most reliable since Chamnab had sung with Sisamouth at military events during the Khmer Republic period. Chamnab further stated that Sisamouth was executed at the site of a current banana plantation. In 2009, Sisamouth's son claimed to know the name of his father's executioner from Chamnab’s accounts and that the person was still alive. Whatever the cause, Sisamouth almost certainly died during the Khmer Rouge regime but his remains have never been discovered.

== Legacy ==
Sinn Sisamouth – Srolanh Srey Touch (officially titled “សុំរាំជាមួយផង”)
Sample of Sinn Sisamouth's "Srolanh Srey Touch" from the Cambodian Rocks compilation.

Many of Sinn Sisamouth's master recordings were either destroyed by the Khmer Rouge regime in its efforts to eliminate foreign influences from Cambodian society, or were lost due to decay. However, collectors and entrepreneurs located and reproduced copies of some of his recordings after the fall of the Khmer Rouge in 1979. Some of his songs have been covered by modern Cambodian singers, such as "Srey Sros Khmeng" by Suong Chantha in 2002. Western listeners were introduced to his work starting in the late 1990s with the release of the Cambodian Rocks bootleg album, followed by the soundtrack to the film City of Ghosts.

Sisamouth’s son recalls a profound statement by his father about his love for music that couldn’t be far from the truth. It was that if the country didn’t survive, he believed his music and name would still live on because of music’s impact on one’s soul. Due to his influence on Cambodian music being so great, Sisamouth is still a household name in Cambodia and remains popular to this day. He is extensively profiled in the 2015 documentary film on the history of Cambodian popular music, Don't Think I've Forgotten, in which several interview subjects describe Sisamouth as the most important Cambodian musician of all time. The film takes its title from a Sisamouth song. Often called the "King of Khmer music" or "the Cambodian Elvis," his lasting cultural impact is difficult to overstate.

While Sisamouth is believed to have written well over one thousand songs, most have been lost while others that survived were copied and sold without any benefits going to his family. Cambodia passed its first copyright law in 2003, allowing families to claim the artists' intellectual property for the first time. In 2014, Sisamouth's family provided proof of composition and was awarded copyright ownership for over 180 songs. The event was commemorated with a celebration and tribute concert. However, the nation of Cambodia has also claimed Sisamouth's songs as state property, in another indication of his popularity and influence.

Sisamouth's son Sinn Chanchhaya became a singer for the Cambodian Radio station, though he admitted he could not be compared to his father. Chanchhaya died in 2015. A tribute concert titled "It's Time to Give Back: A Tribute to the Golden Voice of Cambodia," promoting Sisamouth's music and the need for intellectual property benefits for his family and the families of his contemporaries, was held in Phnom Penh in November 2015. In 2023, former Kun Khmer boxer Bout Samrech claimed he is Sisamouth's son. According to Samrech, Sisamouth had taken his mother as a secret mistress, and he learned that Sisamouth was his "father" at the age of 14 when informed about it by his foster mother.

Singer-songwriter Sin Setsochhata, a granddaughter of Sinn Sisamouth, has gained international notice for combining Cambodian rock influences with modern pop sounds. Documentary filmmakers Chris G. Parkhurst and Stephanie Vincenti have produced a documentary about Sinn Sisamouth called Elvis of Cambodia. The film is 74 minutes long and is available in Khmer and English.

== See also ==
- Sinn Sisamouth discography
