= City of Ghosts (2002 film) =

American crime thriller film by Matt Dillon

- Theatrical release poster
- Directed by: Matt Dillon
- Written by: Matt Dillon; Barry Gifford; Mike Jones
- Produced by: Willi Baer; Michael Cerenzie; Deepak Nayar
- Starring: Matt Dillon; James Caan; Stellan Skarsgård; Natascha McElhone; Gérard Depardieu
- Cinematography: Jim Denault
- Edited by: Howard E. Smith
- Music by: Tyler Bates
- Production company: United Artists
- Distributed by: MGM Distribution Co.
- Release dates: September 10, 2002 (TIFF); April 25, 2003 (United States)
- Running time: 116 minutes
- Country: United States
- Language: English
- Budget: $17.5 million
- Box office: $1.3 million

City of Ghosts is a 2002 American crime thriller film co-written, directed by and starring Matt Dillon, about a con artist who must go to Cambodia to collect his share of money from an insurance scam. The film was made in Cambodia, in locations that include Phnom Penh and the Bokor Hill Station.

It premiered at the Toronto International Film Festival in 2002, and was released in the United States on April 25, 2003.

== Premise ==
Jimmy is a conman who has been working for an insurance company in New York City that the FBI is investigating since it cannot pay policyholder claims following a hurricane. The mastermind of the scheme and his mentor, Marvin, is in Cambodia.

In Bangkok, Jimmy learns from Joseph Kaspar, a partner in the scheme, that Marvin is in Cambodia, where he is involved in a casino scheme. The roads are not safe so a guide takes Jimmy by back trail to Phnom Penh. There, he hires a cyclo driver named Sok, to take him to his destination, a run-down bar and hotel owned by a Frenchman named Emile.

He learns to trust the word of Sok when attempting to make contact as there are unsafe places and people. He meets an NGO worker named Sophie and dabbles in romance with her while attending a rave party at an ancient temple.

Marvin turns up, but the scam he is trying to put together – involving corrupt Cambodian government officials, high-ranking military and the Russian mafia – turns out to be more risky and dangerous than was anticipated.

== Cast ==
- Matt Dillon as Jimmy
- James Caan as Marvin
- Natascha McElhone as Sophie
- Gérard Depardieu as Emile
- Kem Sereyvuth as Sok
- Stellan Skarsgård as Joseph Kaspar
- Rose Byrne as Sabrina
- Shawn Andrews as Robbie
- Kyoza as Rocky
- Loto as The Red Tuxedo Man
- Robert Campbell as Simon
- Bo Hopkins as Teddy (uncredited)

== Release ==
=== Box office ===
Made on a budget of $17.5 million, the film only gained a limited release, and made $357,197 at the domestic box office, and a total of $1.3 million worldwide.

=== Critical reception ===
On review aggregator Rotten Tomatoes, the film holds an approval rating of 47% based on 66 reviews, with an average rating of 5.53/10. The website's critics consensus called the film "Atmospheric, but that's about it." On Metacritic, the film has a weighted average score of 57 out of 100, based on 26 critics, indicating "mixed or average" reviews.

== Soundtrack ==
Music from the Motion Picture City of Ghosts

Soundtrack album by various artists
- Released: April 29, 2003
- Genre: Soundtrack
- Label: Lakeshore Records

Professional ratings
Review scores
Source	Rating
Allmusic	4/5 stars

The soundtrack for City of Ghosts features an electric mix of music that includes 1960s-70s Cambodian rock and roll, French pop and American pre-World War II blues and jazz.
