= List of Cambodians =

This is a list of notable Cambodian people, persons from Cambodia or of Khmer descent.

- Aki Ra
- Ang Chan I
- Ang Duong
- Am Rong
- Ampor Tevi
- Arn Chorn-Pond
- Beat Richner
- Bérénice Marlohe
- Bour Kry
- Chan Nak
- Chan Sy
- Chanthou Oeur
- Chath Piersath
- Chea Sim
- Chea Soth
- Chea Vannath
- Chea Vichea
- Cheam Channy
- Cheng Heng
- Chhet Sovanpanha
- Chhim Sothy
- Chhom Nimol
- Chhouk Rin
- Chou Bun Eng
- Chuon Nath
- Danh Monica
- Dap Chhuon
- Gen. Dien Del
- Dith Pran
- Duong Saree
- Dy Saveth
- Eh Phuthong
- Geraldine Cox
- Haing S. Ngor
- Heng Samrin
- Him Sivorn
- Hong Lim
- Hun Sen
- Hun Manet
- Ieng Sary
- Ieng Thirith
- Ieu Koeus
- Ieu Pannakar
- In Tam
- Jayavarman II
- Jayavarman VII
- Kak Channthy
- Kem Monovithya
- Kem Sokha
- Keng Vannsak
- Keo Pich Pisey
- Khieu Ponnary
- Khieu Samphan
- Kum Bunnadeth
- King Norodom Sihanouk
- Kong Som Eun
- Koul Panha
- L'Okhna Suttantaprija ind
- Lon Nil (Lon Nol's brother)
- Lon Nol
- Lon Non (Lon Nol's brother)
- Long Boret
- Loung Ung
- Maha Ghosananda
- Mam Nai
- Meas Kheng
- Gen. Meas Sophea
- Meng Keo Pichenda
- Ngoun Chhay Kry
- Norodom Buppha Devi
- Norodom Jenna
- Norodom Ranariddh
- Norodom Sihamoni
- Norodom Sihanouk
- Norodom Suramarit
- Noy Vanneth
- Nuon Chea
- Pal Vannarirak
- Pan Ron
- Pao Ham Phan
- Peter L. Pond
- Pisith Pilika
- Pol Pot
- Preah Botumthera Som
- Preap Sovath
- Rim Kin
- Rithy Panh
- Ros Serey Sothea
- Gen. Sak Sutsakhan
- Sam Rainsy
- Sam Sary
- Saom Vansodany
- Sar Kheng
- Sichan Siv
- Sinn Sisamouth
- Sisowath Sirik Matak
- So Phim
- Sok Sreymom
- Somaly Mam
- Son Ngoc Minh
- Son Ngoc Thanh
- Son Sann
- Son Sen
- Sosthène Fernandez
- Suryavarman II
- Soth Polin
- Ta Mok
- Teng Bunma
- Tep Rindaro
- Tep Vong
- Thongvan Fanmuong
- Ung Huot
- Vandy Kaonn
- Vann Vannak
- Vannda
- Vann Molyvann
- Vann Nath
- Veth Rattana
- Vichara Dany
- Virak Dara
- Yim Guechse
- Yoeu Yanny
- Yol Aularong
- You Bo
- Youk Chhang

== See also ==
- Lists of people by nationality
