= List of Cambodian artists =

This is a list of artists from, or associated with, Cambodia.

== C ==
- Monirith Chhea (born 1960s)
- Chhan Dina (born 1984)
- Channy Chhoeun (born 1988)

== D ==
- Nhek Dim (1934-1978)
- Duong Saree (born 1957)

== N ==
- Vann Nath (1946-2011)

== O ==
- Chanthou Oeur

== P ==
- Sopheap Pich (born 1971)
- Chath Piersath

== R ==
- Chhoen Rithy (born 1965)

== S ==
- Albert Samreth (born 1987)
- LinDa Saphan (born 1975)
- Duong Saree (born 1957)
- Oeur Sokuntevy (born 1983)
- Hen Sophal (born 1958)
- Chhim Sothy (born 1969)

== Y ==
- You Khin (1947-2009)
