= List of Cambodian singers =

This is a list of singers from the Kingdom of Cambodia.

== A ==
- Adda Angel
- Aok Sokunkanha

== B ==
- Bonny B.

== C ==
- Chhet Sovanpanha
- Chhom Nimol
- Chhorn Sovannareach

== G ==
- G-Devith

== H ==
- Him Sivorn
- Huoy Meas (Death)

== K ==
- Keo Pichenda
- Kak Channthy
- Khemarak Sereymun
- Khemarak Sreypov

== L ==
- Laura Mam
- Liev Tuk

== M ==
- Mao Sareth (Death)
- Meas Soksophea
- Meas Samon
- Monetrey Ek

== P ==
- Pen Ron (Death)
- Pich Sophea
- Pisith Pilika (Death)
- Pou Vannary
- Preap Sovath

== R ==
- Ros Serey Sothea (Death)

== S ==
- Sinn Sisamouth (Death)
- So Savoeun
- Sokun Nisa
- Sok Pisey

== T ==
- Tep Boprek
- Tep Rindaro
- Ton Chanseyma
- Touch Sunnix

== V ==
- VannDa

== Y ==
- Yeun Savuth
- Yol Aularong
