= List of Cambodian Americans =

This is a list of notable Cambodian Americans, including both original immigrants who obtained American citizenship and their American descendants.

To be included in this list, the person must have a Wikipedia article showing they are Cambodian American or must have references showing they are Cambodian American and are notable.

== List ==
- Keo Sambath Pich - Khmer traditional musician; Khmer Rouge survivor, collaboration soundtrack work with short film What I See When I Close My Eyes & New Year Baby
- Jaydon Nget, actor; known for his role as Two-Bit in the North American Broadway Tour of The Outsiders Musical
- Zach Charbonnet - football player; drafted to the Seattle Seahawks in the 2023 NFL draft
- Francois Chau - actor; known for his role as Dr. Pierre Chang in Lost
- Sokhary Chau - Mayor of Lowell. First mayor of Cambodian descent in the US.
- Monirith Chhea - visual artist originally from Phnom Penh
- Arn Chorn-Pond - musician and human rights activist
- Kris Dim - body builder
- Bhante Dharmawara - Buddhist monk and teacher; helped resettle thousands of Cambodian refugees in the US; founded the first Cambodian Buddhist temple in the US
- Sophal Ear - professor at Arizona State University and refugee from Phnom Penh
- Maya Gilliss-Chapman - founder and CEO of Cambodians in Tech, Miss Cambodian American, 2nd Runner
- Elizabeth Heng - politician, candidate for California's 16th congressional district in 2018
- Tara Hong - Cambodian American elected to the Massachusetts state legislature (18th Middlesex District)
- Vanna Howard - politician, first Cambodian American woman elected to the Massachusetts state legislature (17th Middlesex District)
- Soben Huon - Miss Utah 2006
- Jessa Khan - martial artist/sportsperson
- SreyRam Kuy - first female Cambodian refugee to become a surgeon in the United States; former Chief Medical Officer for Medicaid for the state of Louisiana; former Deputy Under Secretary for Health for Community Care, United States Department of Veterans Affairs
- Phillip Lim - fashion designer
- Kalyanee Mam - filmmaker
- Laura Mam - musician and music industry entrepreneur.
- Ros Mey - Buddhist monk and survivor of the Khmer Rouge regime, head monk of Wat Thormikaram in Providence, Rhode Island
- Rady Mom - politician, first Cambodian American elected to the Massachusetts state legislature (18th Middlesex District)
- Sochua Mu - politician, democracy and women's rights activist
- Chhom Nimol - lead vocalist for the band Dengue Fever
- Haing S. Ngor (1940-1996) - Oscar-winning actor for his performance in the movie The Killing Fields; author, physician
- Ted Ngoy - "Doughnut King," entrepreneur and politician
- Soma Norodom - Princess of Cambodia, journalist and author
- Chanthou Oeur - painter and sculptor
- Monty Oum - visual artist, designer, and animator, of Cambodian and Vietnamese descent
- Pisay Pao - actress
- Sopheap Pich - sculptor and visual artist
- Chath PierSath - poet, painter, and humanitarian
- Dith Pran (1942-2008) - portrayed in the movie The Killing Fields; photojournalist for The New York Times; human rights activist
- Apsara Sakbun - Olympic swimmer
- Brandon Sakbun - mayor
- San Kim Sean - martial artist
- Theary Seng - human rights activist
- Sophiline Cheam Shapiro - choreographer and dance teacher
- Sichan Siv - former U.S. Ambassador to the United Nations Economic and Social Council and the author of Golden Bones
- Anthony Veasna So - writer
- Pou Sohtireak - politician
- Khatharya Um - professor of Asian American and Asian Diaspora Studies in the Department of Ethnic Studies at UC Berkeley and Berkeley's first Cambodian-American faculty member
- Loung Ung - author, speaker, Khmer Rouge survivor and activist against landmines
- Sandra Ung - member of the New York City Council
- Jordan Windle - Olympic diver
- Chhun Yasith - political activist, received life sentence for attempting a coup
- Nite Yun - chef and restaurateur

=== Naturalized ===
- Angelina Jolie - American actress, maintains dual Cambodian and American citizenship, given Cambodian citizenship in 2005
