= Meas =

Meas (Khmer: មាស [miəh]) is a Khmer name meaning "gold". It can be used as a given name or a surname. Notable people with the name include:

== Surname ==
- Meas Samon (fl. 1940s–1970s), Cambodian rock singer and comedian
- Meas Kheng (born 1946), Cambodian sprinter
- Meas Sophea (born 1955), Cambodian general
- Meas Soksophea (born 1984), Cambodian pop singer

== Given name ==
- Keo Meas (1926–1976), Cambodian communist politician
- Huoy Meas (1946-1975), Cambodian singer and radio announcer
