= Im Song Soeum =

Cambodian musician (1943–c. 1972)

Im Song Soeum អ៊ឹម សុងសឺម
- Im Song Soeum c. 1960s

Background information
- Born: Im Song Soeum - អ៊ឹម សុងសឺម c. 1943; Kampong Preah, Battambang province, Cambodia, French Indochina
- Died: March 16, 1972 (aged 29) Battambang, Khmer Republic
- Genres: Khmer pop; slow rock; jerk; bolero; romvong; saravann; Afro-Latin; blues; cha cha cha; film
- Occupation: Singer
- Years active: 1962–1972
- Labels: Bokor; Cambodia; Chanchhaya; GANEFO Records; Independance; Olympic; Phnom Penh; Wat-Phnom
- Website: www.thecvma.org/singers

Im Song Soeum (Note: Khmer: អ៊ឹម សុងសឺម, romanized: Uĕm Sŏng Seum; Khmer pronunciation: [ʔɨm soŋ.səːm]) (c. 1943 – 1972) was a Cambodian singer active from 1962 to 1972. During his career, he became an important figure of Cambodian rock. He is known for helping start the singing careers of Huoy Meas, Pen Ran, and Ros Serey Sothea, who would become among the most established Cambodian singers of the era. Song Soeum—along with Sinn Sisamouth, Ros Serey Sothea, Pen Ran, Huoy Meas, Mao Sareth, and other Cambodian artists—was part of the pre-genocide music scene in Cambodia that fused elements of Khmer traditional music with Western sounds, including rhythm and blues and rock and roll, developing unique sounds in Cambodia's history of music.

== Biography ==
Im Song Soeum was born in Kampong Preah, Battambang province. He was the son of Tan Soeun (mother), and Im Sean (father). Early details of his life are scarce, but prior to his singing career he attended Preah Monivong High School in Battambang until his third year. Around 1962, he entered a provincial singing contest where he won first place. He was friends with future singers Huoy Meas and Pen Ran, and the three sang for the local troupe Lomhea Yothea, singer Ros Serey Sothea would later join this troupe. That same year the three of them were invited by the Ministry of Information in Phnom Penh to sing for its music band.

By 1963, Song Soeum was regularly recording music for labels such as Chanchhaya, Independance and Wat-Phnom Disques. His duet with Huoy Meas titled “ដើរលេងក្នុងសួន [A Walk in the Garden]” became a hit song catapulting the two to fame. In 1964, Song Soeum and other singers at the Ministry of Information had took part in inviting Ros Serey Sothea to Phnom Penh on behalf of musician Ma Laopi. During this time he began duetting with Ros Serey Sothea on her earliest records. Song Soeum had been a notable figure during the Cambodian rock scene, which fused traditional Khmer sounds with Western instrumentation for introducing popular artists earlier in their careers into stardom.

After the Cambodian coup d’état, as the civil war intensified, Song Soeum joined the Khmer Republic military as a soldier under the 13th Infantry Brigade where he rose to the title of second lieutenant. His most popular song is a duet with Ros Serey Sothea titled “ខ្មៅអើយខ្មៅ [Dark Skinned Beauty]” which challenged colorism in Cambodian society. Some of his final works included “ឪពុកខ្ញុំ [My Father]”, “ភ្នំពេជ្រនិល [Pech Nil Mountain]”, “កម្លោះក្រមុំហ៊ឺហា [The Flashy Bachelor and Maiden]”, and “ចាំមើលតែផ្លូវ [Waiting for You by the Road]”. Song Soeum passed away in Battambang at 5:30 PM on March 16, 1972. His cause of death was due to stomach cancer.

== Legacy ==
Im Song Soeum's surviving discography and the legal rights of his music has been restored by the Cambodian Vintage Music Archive.
