= Nhek Dim =

Cambodian artist, painter, writer and composer

- Born: February 12, 1934; Pea Reang District, Prey Veng Province, Cambodia
- Died: December 16, 1978 (aged 44)
- Known for: Painting

Nhek Dim (Khmer: ញឹក ឌឹម) (February 12, 1934 – December 16, 1978) was a Cambodian artist, painter, writer and composer.

== Biography ==
Nhek Dim was born on February 12, 1934, in Reap village, Reap commune, Pea Reang District, in Prey Veng Province, Cambodia. His parents, Nhek Pidaou and Prom Pul, were prosperous farmers. From childhood he showed a remarkable talent in drawing, and he loved to paint. He finished elementary school in 1949. Because of his obvious talent, his parents sent him to the School of Cambodian Arts (now the Department of Plastic Arts of the Royal University of Fine Arts) in Phnom Penh. There he studied "traditional painting". He graduated in 1954 and started to work at the US Embassy in Phnom Penh. He married Mao Samen, and they had six children: three girls, who all died at an early age, and three boys. In 1957 he went for six months to the Philippines to draw and publish books. From 1963 to 1967 he resided in the United States to study cartoon filmmaking. His cartoon "The Wise Rabbit" won a 1967 student competition organized by Walt Disney. Later, former King of Cambodia Norodom Sihanouk asked him to make paintings to illustrate a book of songs written by the ex-King. Occasionally he drew satirical cartoons that were published in several magazines. He owned his own gallery where he exhibited his old paintings and water colors. Besides painting and drawing he was also the author of several novels, and composer of many songs. He was a close friend of Sinn Sisamouth, although for some time they were not on speaking terms. Nhek Dim died on December 16, 1978, as one more artist who didn't survive the Khmer Rouge regime. He left a wife and three sons.

== Subjects and Style ==
Nhek Dim's works – sometimes realistic, sometimes more stylized – often depict traditional Cambodian landscapes, tourist sites like Angkor and Kampot's Tek Chhou, and Khmer and native people. He also painted many portraits of Cambodian pop stars, like Sinn Sisamouth, Ros Sereysothea, Pan Ron and Huoy Meas, for the covers of their records. He was especially skilled at painting remarkably lifelike people and their faces.

Some critics have argued that Nhek Dim epitomized the dreams of modernization of Cambodia promoted by Sihanouk in the 1960s. He used a new artistic language even when portraying traditional Cambodian scenes, “smoked and drank as he painted representing a ‘Bohemian’ ideal familiar from Sihanouk’s films,” and operated in the 1960s as an artist-businessman, offering his paintings both in his gallery and in shops selling luxury goods.

Many of Nhek Dim's paintings have been collected or photographed by Lors Chinda. His publishing house published a book showing many of Nhek Dim's works.
