= Sophal =

Sophal is a given name and surname originating from Cambodia. Notable people with the name include:

- Hen Sophal (born 1958), Cambodian artist
- Kuy Sophal (born 1956), Cambodian politician, Deputy Prime Minister of Cambodia from 2024
- Sophal Ear, Cambodian-American political scientist
- Sophal Dimong (born 2001), Cambodian footballer
