= Rithy =

Rithy (Khmer: ឫទ្ធី, Rœ̆tthi [ʔrɨt.tʰiː]) is a Khmer name meaning "strength". It can be used as a given name or a surname. Notable people with the name include:

Given name

- Chan Rithy (born 1983), Cambodian footballer
- Chhoen Rithy (born 1965), Cambodian artist
- Sok Rithy (born 1990), Cambodian footballer

Surname

- Hab Rithy (born 1991), English teacher
- Rithy Panh (born 1964), Cambodian filmmaker
