= Chhim =

'Chhim may refer to:

== Places ==
- Shheem Arabic: شحيم, also tranliterated as Chhim, a village in Lebanon

== People ==
- Chhim Siek Leng, Cambodian politician
- Chhim Sothy (born 1969), Cambodian painter and sculptor
