= Tracey Shelton =

Australian journalist

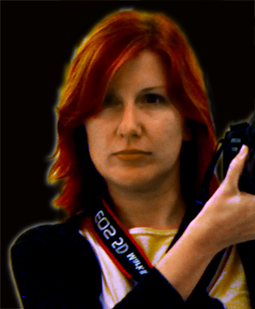
- Born: Darraweit Guim, Victoria, Australia
- Education: University of Bolton (MA)
- Occupations: Journalist; Photographer; Author
- Employers: The Phnom Penh Post (2005–2009); GlobalPost (2011–2014); ABC (2017–present)
- Notable work: Coverage of the Libyan Civil War and the Syrian Civil War
- Awards: George Polk Award (2012)
- Website: traceyshelton.com

Tracey Shelton is an Australian journalist for the Australian Broadcasting Corporation in their Asia-Pacific newsroom. In 2012, her photographs of a Syrian tank attack on rebel fighters in Aleppo gained significant attention from mainstream and social media. She also covered the Libyan Civil War and obtained exclusive footage of Muammar Gaddafi's death which led to a UN enquiry. Shelton has won many international accolades for her work including a George Polk Award, an Overseas Press Club honour and an award of excellence from POYi.

== Early and personal life ==
Shelton was raised on a farm in the central Victorian town of Darraweit Guim. Shelton volunteered at Sunrise Cambodia at a young age and continued her involvement with the organisation and support for the children throughout her life. In June 2015, Shelton married Syrian refugee Ahmad al-Haj, whom she met through mutual friends whilst she was living in Syria.

== Education ==
In 2012, Shelton completed a master's degree from the University of Bolton's International Multimedia Photojournalism program based in China.

== Career ==
An image by Tracey Shelton of an explosion from a tank shell in Aleppo

Shelton began her career in 2005 in Cambodia, freelancing and later working for The Phnom Penh Post, Post Khmer and Seven Days magazine. She was on assignment in Iraq when she moved to Libya to cover the civil war. She was tied and brutally beaten in her hotel room in Benghazi during a robbery and attempted kidnapping, from which she escaped by jumping to another balcony. She later obtained exclusive video of the death of Muammar Gaddafi.

In September 2012, Shelton was reporting on rebel fighters near the front lines in Aleppo. Shortly after a warning that a Syrian tank was near, Shelton filmed a shell impact as it exploded nearby, killing three of the four rebels at the position. Images and accounts of the encounter and Shelton's reporting style were widely redistributed by traditional news sites as well as social media. In her account of the incident, Shelton said, "I was covered in the dust and debris; it started really coming down. So I ran back a bit, and we stood back behind this cloud and were waiting for these guys, the guys to come running through.... and no one came."

Shelton was presented with the George Polk Award for Video Reporting by Carl Bernstein for a series of video reports on Aleppo, Syria throughout 2012. Bernstein remarked that Shelton had communicated "the human tragedy of the conflict in Syria in a way that is impossible to ignore or forget. Through powerful video, viscerally engaging images and authoritative writing, she gave voice and face to those most affected by the civil war."

Shelton has since received 19 international awards and accolades for her work including a Peabody, POYi Pictures of the Year International Award of Excellence in Multimedia and the Media Award presented by the International Society for the Study of Trauma and Dissociation for broadcast news and articles on complex trauma and incestuous child abuse.

As of September 2022 Shelton works for the Australian Broadcasting Corporation as a Middle East expert in the Asia Pacific newsroom.

== Sunrise Cambodia ==
It was announced in September 2022 that Shelton, who had volunteered at the Sunrise Cambodia orphanage since 1998, would be taking over leadership of the charity network from Geraldine Cox.
