= So Savoeun =

Cambodian singer

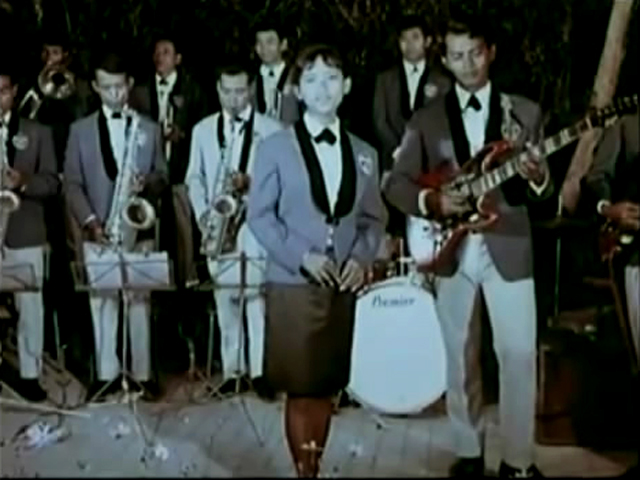
- So-Savoeun as a performer in the 1969 film "La Joie de Vivre"
- Born: June 1, 1945 (age 81); Kampong Speu Province, Kingdom of Kampuchea
- Occupation: Singer
- Years active: the early 1960s until the mid-1970s
- Style: traditional Sarawan style

So Savoeun (Note: Khmer: សូ សាវឿន, romanized: So Savuean; Khmer pronunciation: [so saː.ʋɨən]) (born 1 June 1945) is a Cambodian singer.

Savoeun specializes in the Saravan style. She was a popular singer in Cambodia during the 1960s and early 1970s. She often performed duets with Meas Samon as well as with Sinn Sisamouth, Ros Sereysothea, Pen Ran, Eung Nary, Chea Savoeun, Duok Kim Hak, and other artists.

Before the Khmer Rouge took over Phnom Penh, she fled to Thailand. She and her husband later moved to France. She lives outside of Paris, where she has given concerts. So Savoeun is among the last representatives of the old generation of Cambodian musicians. She appeared in the short French documentary Les Artistes Khmers about Khmer artists in France.

== Filmography ==
She appeared uncredited as a singer in the film, "La Joie de Vivre [The Joy of Living]".
