= Ros Saboeut =

- Born: c. 1942
- Died: March 5, 2014 (age 72)
- Known for: Activism on behalf of musicians

Ros Saboeut (c. 1942 – March 5, 2014) was a Cambodian activist known for working on behalf of that country's musicians. Saboeut was one of five siblings born to her parents, Ros Bun and Nath Samean. Her younger sister was singer Ros Serey Sothea.

In the 1960s, Cambodian Head of State Norodom Sihanouk, a musician himself, encouraged the development of popular music in Cambodia. This inspired a flourishing rock music scene based in Phnom Penh, in which Saboeut's sister Sothea achieved great fame and influence. This music scene was abruptly crushed by the Khmer Rouge communists in 1975. Saboeut survived the ensuing Cambodian genocide, but her sister Sothea disappeared and is presumed dead, as is the case with many of Sothea's contemporaries in Cambodian popular music.

After the fall of the Khmer Rouge in 1979, many musicians contacted Saboeut to inquire about her sister Sothea's fate. Maintaining a list of contacts, Saboeut took the opportunity to reunite Cambodia's surviving rock musicians. Her efforts are widely credited with reviving Cambodian music in the aftermath of the genocide. According to Youk Chhang, the executive director of the Documentation Center of Cambodia, Saboeut sought to restore Cambodian music as a tribute to her sister, saying "I think she was bound by the legacy of her sister to help."

Shortly before her death, Saboeut was interviewed extensively for the 2015 documentary film on the history of Cambodian rock music, Don't Think I've Forgotten, in which her sister Sothea is profiled in detail. Saboeut had a daughter and three grandchildren. She died of complications from a fall at age 72 on March 5, 2014.
