= Duong Saree =

Cambodian artist and illustrator

- Born: 1957 (age 68–69)
- Education: Royal University of Fine Arts
- Movement: Traditional

Duong Saree (born 1957) is a Cambodian artist and illustrator.

She studied for a degree in plastic arts at the Royal University of Fine Arts in Phnom Penh, Cambodia, in 1970 and pursued a career in art. In 2003, she produced an exhibition of his works at Providence College, Rhode Island, USA. She has also illustrated books and covers in Cambodia.

== Exhibitions ==
- 1990: "Redd Barna in Cambodia" (cover publication of the book).
- 2000: "The Legacy of absence: a Cambodian story" Reyum, Phnom Penh, Cambodia.
- 2002: "Visions of the Future", Reyum, Phnom Penh, Cambodia.
- 2003: "The Spirit of Cambodia... a tribute", Providence College, Rhode Island, USA.

== Awards ==
- 2010: You Khin Memorial Women's Art Prize
