= Kbach =

Cambodian art of ornamentation

Kbach (Khmer: ក្បាច់) or Khmer ornamentation is made of traditional decorative elements of Cambodian architecture. While 'kbach' may refer to any sort of art-form style in the Khmer language, such as a gesture in Khmer classical dance, kbach rachana specifically refers to decorative ornament motifs. Kbach are also used in decorating of Cambodian silver crafts, furniture, regalia, murals, pottery, ceramics, stone carving, in a singular artistic expression:

the exceptional advantage that the Khmers have drawn from nature and the human experience as the universal framework of any aesthetic experience has contributed to rendering in the kbach one of the most remarkable traits of human genius, that of artistic expression.

— Thierry Bizot, Les ensembles ornementaux illimités d'Angkor

== Etymology ==
According to Chuon Nath's dictionary, kbach (ក្បាច់) used to be written kbache (ក្បាចេ) and is a derivative of kach (កាច់), to hit or break, with a bilabial infix which is a form of intensive morphology, suggesting to hit repeatedly.

== Kbach: ornamentation in Khmer decorative arts ==
=== Historical development: a visual tradition ===
==== From Indian influence to Khmer identity ====
Not only are many decorative themes unique to Cambodia, but ornamentation motives as well are quite different from those found in India, though they can be related. The lintels chiselled with delicate reliefs, abutments excavated with foliage, pediments decorated with mythological scenes in high relief, without being specific to Cambodia, have a very special appearance which suggests that the traits of Hindu art found in the temples of Angkor owe more to religious influence than to school discipline. The Khmer artists radically modified what they had received and developed a new canon which rules would be respected through centuries.

==== From wood to stone ====
Art historians have considered that the sandstone sculptures replicated techniques pioneered from working in wood. Gilberte de Coral-Rémusat supposed that wooden models were the common ancestors of both Indian and Khmer decorative ornamentation. She believed that the particular sandstone employed by the Khmer was so easily manipulated that the adaptation from wood to stone decorative techniques was made with little impediment.

During the Angkor period it is conceivable that artists used copy books, but because of their perishable nature none have survived to the present day. However, Henri Marchal believed that Cambodians were not accustomed to working according to texts and that the oral traditions were enough in the majority of the cases to be used as starting point.

==== A marker of Khmer national identify ====
Kbach, as other cultural elements of Cambodia, has recently become associated with the khmer predicament suggesting just how important it now is for the constitution of Khmer identity, so much so that, for the Khmer diaspora, "when touches of the authentic architecture and ornamentation of Cambodia are added to a temple compound in America, believers are comforted by the tradition and legitimacy of their surroundings."

=== Shapes: the four kinds of unlimited ensembles ===
Generally all Kbachs shapes refer to natural elements.

The ornamental sets are not limited to the sole figuration of a decor: they reflect the laws of rhythm and balance presiding over the harmonious composition of a whole. Bizot identifies four types of figures.

==== Checkered figures ====
The checkered figures are an unlimited figure which comes in two aspects: the first is a set of endless squares produced in two directions; the second is a network of orthogonal lines with quadratic cells. We find this motif, for example, on the third floor of Angkor Wat. The center, generally exploited in a large circular motif, distributes along the diagonals, four fusiform florets, and along the mediators, four shafts with scalloped ends. Each of them exploits the same elements: a center, a cross, a saltire, and essentially comes down to a diagram which specifies the center and the axes of symmetry of the square. Thus, at the western entrance to Angkor Wat, the cruciferous squares specify a set of Saint Andrew's crosses and a set of Maltese crosses. The central figure of the motifs, including the particular nature of each (Rahu, lotus flower, ...) individualizes analogous structures in a way, can still add to the subtlety of these sets.

==== Alternating checkered figures ====
The figures with alternating checkered figures adds to the straight-square couple the opposition of black and white. It finds its schematic expression in the figure of the checkerboard. The opposition can be translated in different ways: hollow and salient, ornamental and bare, empty and full. This ornamentation was developed in particular at Banteay Srei.

==== Circular medallion figures ====
The circular figures with medallions are made up of tangential circles which are opposed to the quaternary of the squares which contain them, thus defining a background and a movement, as for example, in the winding of the floriferous medallions of Ta Prohm.

==== Leafy figures ====
The branched figures are found on the seedlings which offer the possibility of using motifs which do not necessarily present a geometric character. The branching possibilities of branching figures allow the use of sterile surfaces. This richness of expression gives particular nuances and complex movements.

Here are some examples of the most famous ones:

- The frontal lotus petal shape.
- The Lotus petal seen from the side shape.
- The Ficus religiosa leaf shape.
- The Chan flower shape.
- The spiral snail shell shape.
- The mythical goose tail shape.
- The flame shape.
- The Phni Tes shape etc.

These standard basic shapes are internally divided into more complex ornaments using one of the styles of division characteristic for a specific school of kbach.

Kbach Angkor ornament based on the basic form of the chan flower

Kbach Angkor ornaments from Angkor Wat, Cambodia

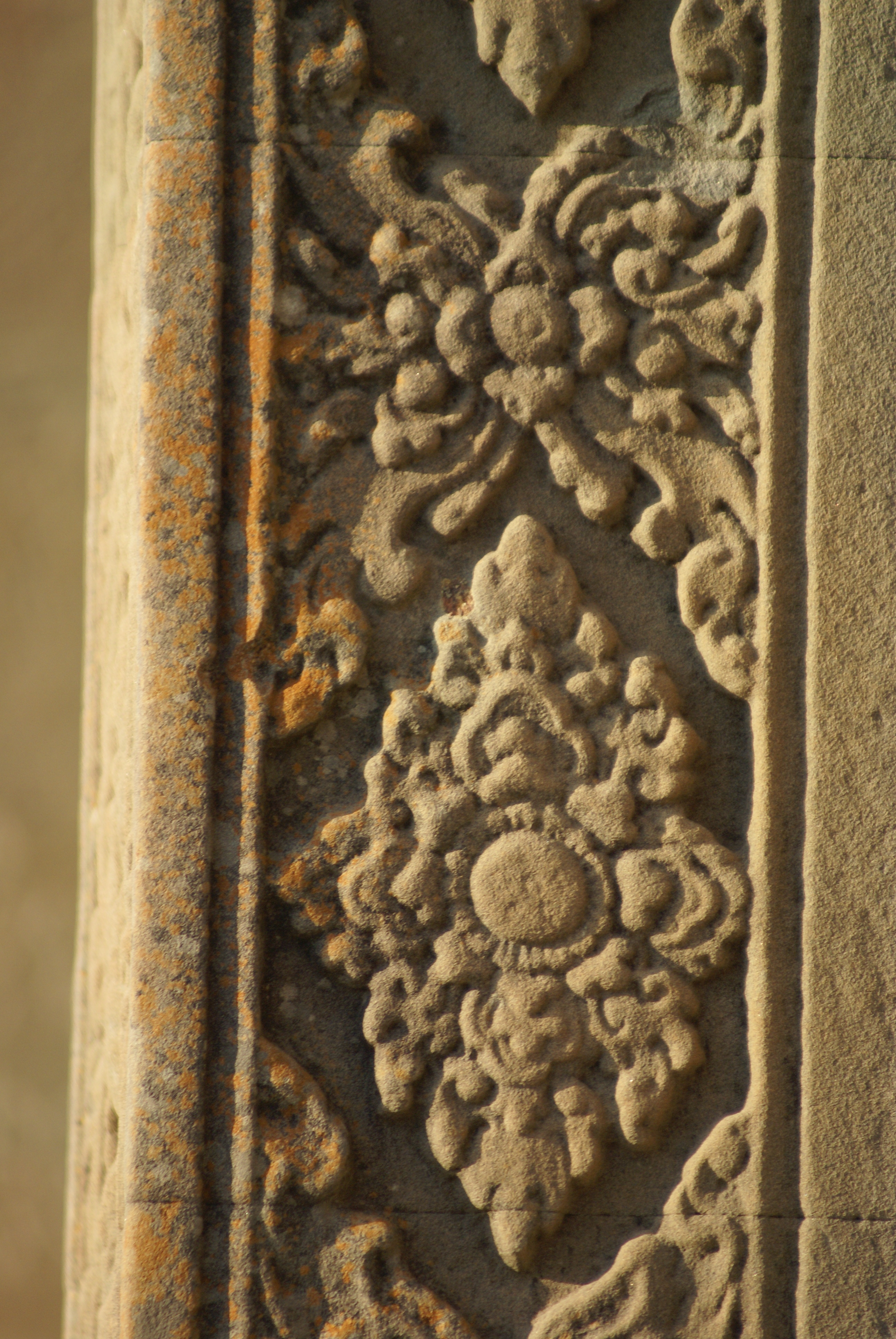
A variant of the chan flower

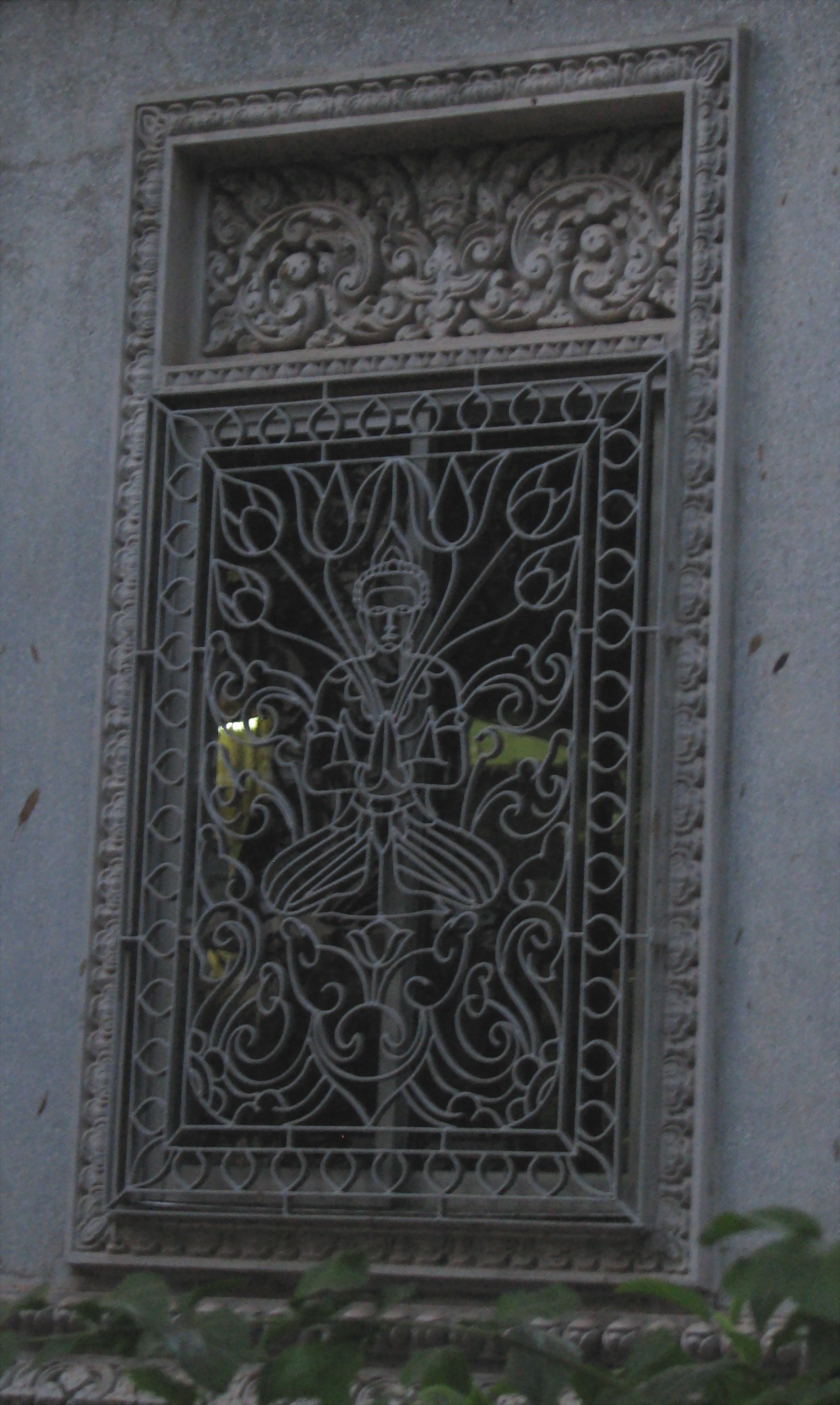
A modern application of Kbach Angkor at Wat Ounalom

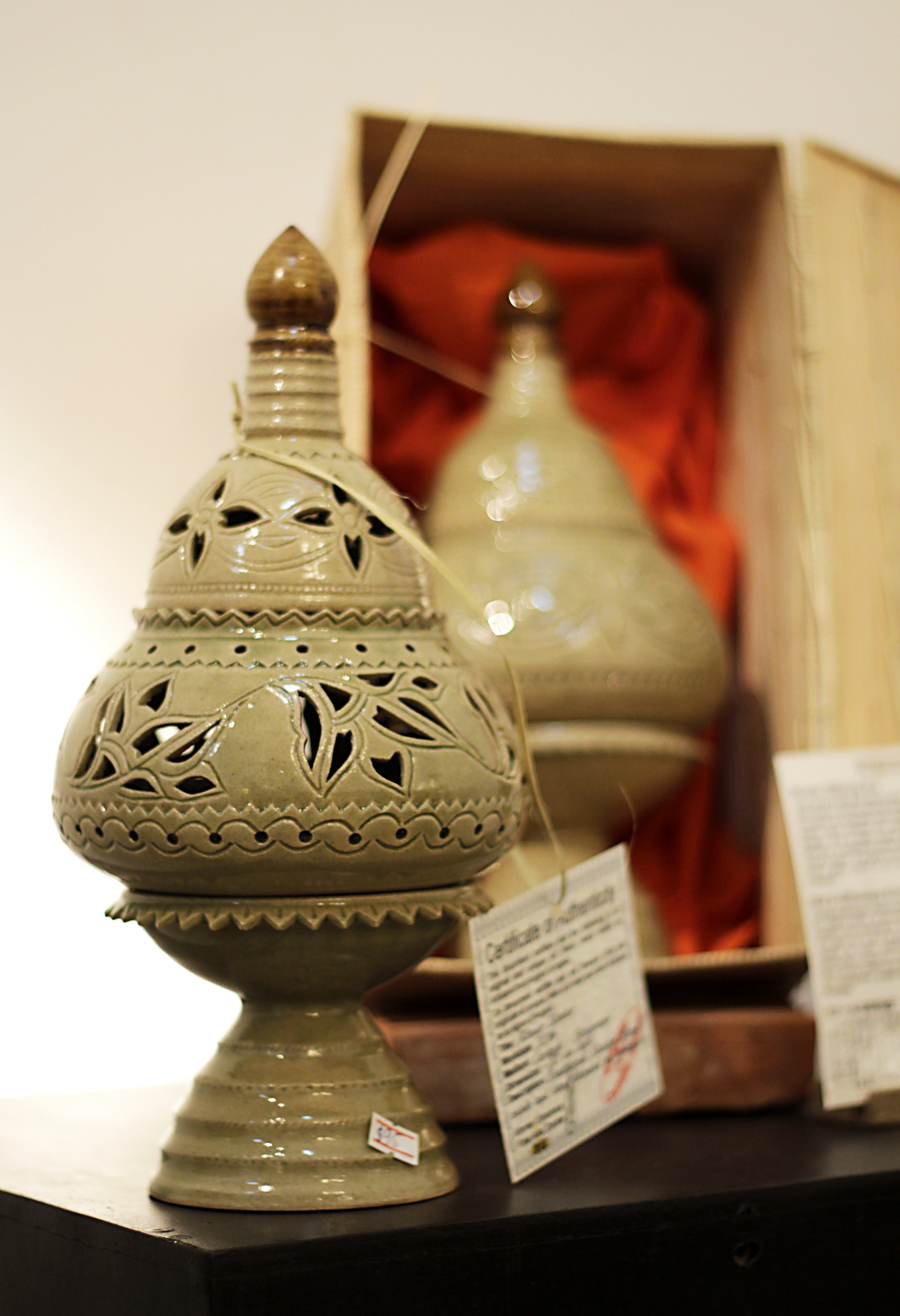
Traditional Khmer ceramics offering box

=== Schools: four major schools ===
The four major schools recognized by contemporary kbach artists are: kbach angkor, kbach phñi tes, kbach phñi voa and kbach phñi phleung:

- kbach angkor (ក្បាច់អង្គរ) - the 'Angkorian style'; a vaguely defined style, though the common elements include snail-like curls called kbach hien (snails), kbach trabak chuk (lotus petals), etc.
- kbach phñi tes (ក្បាច់ភ្ញីទេស) - the 'exotic intertwining style'; a style which utilizes poppy flowers, buds, leaves, and pods; it somewhat resembles the acanthus of Western ornamentation
- kbach phñi voal (ក្បាច់ភ្ញីវល្ល) - the 'intertwining vine style' with animal heads and intertwining vines protruding from their mouths
- kbach phñi phleung (ក្បាច់ភ្ញីភ្លើង) - the 'intertwining flame style' which uses abstract flames in the shape of hamsa tails in an intertwining form

=== Molding ===
The molding in classical Khmer art comes down to a symmetry always observed between the low moldings and the high moldings with respect to a median horizontal axis. This horizontal axis is most often marked by a torus or a band. On both sides, are distributed, in reverse order, listels, covings, plinths or bands. A single exception to this law of symmetry consists in the moldings adorned with bands of lotus petals which are always adorned upwards; whatever the place of these moldings. These moldings are covered with a very busy decoration: button or lotus petals, geometric and floral ornaments sometimes mixed with small figurines and animals.

=== Techniques ===
Medieval tools were certainly lesser quality than contemporary instruments.

The incisions on numerous decorative lintels were very deep, and required the precise removal of small localised pieces of stone. This was probably executed with the use of a small drill that created holes to break elements of the sandstone away.

In the Angkor period lintel sculpture predominantly began with the stone being fixed into position first, and then being prepared for carving. The lintel face was roughly finished into structural divisions. Characters, motifs and designs were transferred onto the sandstone face with charcoal or chalk.

Evidence of the operation of a specific artist or small group of artists, presumably from the same workshop, is recognised in the near identical iconography and chisel aptitude of lintels from Preah Kô and a lintel fragment from Prasat O Ka-aek.

During the French protectorate of Cambodia, French archeologist Henri Groslier set up a school for carvers as a rescue mission to protect, not only Khmer art and workmanship, but "the very essence of Cambodge". Groslier's focused essentially on the reproduction of ancient art forms and artifacts. But according to Ingrid Muan, his legacy in favour of Khmer ornamentation was a "particular frame of copying" that still haunts visual production with a "colonial conception of Khmerness".

In contemporary workshops the master sculptor also acts as a quality controller, marking the sculptures with pencil where they need to be corrected. The final tasks are the detailed and refined carving, followed by cleaning and polishing with a grinding stone which bring the work to completion. The time it takes to complete a sculpture, depends on the skill level of the artist, however, one large and detailed decorative lintel can take as long as three months for two master sculptors to complete.

=== Apprenticeship: learning from the workshop of the master worker ===
As kbach is an oral tradition, passed down through learning and making, there is considerable variety of ways to create an undisputed system of kbach schools.

From the evidence of the remaining kbach in the ruins of Angkor Wat, George Groslier proved that similar pilasters carved by many artists indicate that artisans possessed common knowledge, and similar technical practices and abilities, which were informed by consistent and standardised training.

Basic sculptural training can take anywhere between six months and three years, depending on the aptitude of the individual. It takes over ten years to be an accomplished artist worthy of the title of master. At no time are pupils instructed to draw from nature directly. Instead they are required to reproduce the traditional kbach idealised forms handed down and transformed from generation to generation.

=== Economics ===
Today workshops are paid in cash for the outputs of their labour, but in medieval Cambodia, where there was no system of easily exchanged currency, the inscriptions tell of a system of commerce where donations, payments, and taxes were exchanged between temples, individuals, and the state in numerous forms, including land, grain, livestock, textiles, and metals. Sculptors may also have been compelled to provide their services out of religious or regal obligation.

== Applications of kbach ==
=== Dance: lakhon kbach boran ===
The same term kbach which is used for decorative arts is used for dance, suggesting both fixity and movement. Kbach designates a visual esthetic composition, whether it be engraved in stone or more in the more ephemeral gestures of the Khmer royal ballet.

In this sense, Kbach Khmer is a "system of dance gestures" used in one of the three main theatre genres, all dating back to the Angkorian period—and all based on the Khmer version of the Rāmāyana—the Reamker: lakhon khol (male masked dance mime); sbek thom or sbek touch (Shadow theater) and lkhaon preah reach trop (theatre belonging to the royal family or Royal Ballet of Cambodia) which was renamed lakhon kbach boran after the monarchy was overthrown in 1970.

In Khmer tradition, there are eight basic hand gestures that, in various combination with five basic foot positions, form the "original dance alphabet".

Dancers performing court dance act out plots using the kbach language of dance, articulated by the chorus during vocal and instrumental performances.

While they resemble the karanas of Indian classical dance in form, they are quite different. While the Indian karana is seen as the framework for the "margi" (pan-Indian classical) productions which are supposed to spiritually enlighten the spectators, the kbach of the Khmer Royal Ballet is an ornament or a detail, not a general frame.

=== Martial arts: Kbach kun boran ===
Kbach kun boran in Khmer literally means “Ancient Cambodian Fighting Arts”. It is currently a term that includes all pre-modern Cambodian martial arts. It consists of 12 basic techniques (mae) and eight patterns of "door systems" or footwork patterns (tvear).

=== Textiles: kbach on costumes ===
Kbach were applied beyond decorative arts and dance to a variety of applications, including textiles, which used ornamental patterns for the Khmer hul.

This application of kbach to Khmer costumes as evidenced in the devatas of Angkor Wat was studied extensively by Marchal Sappho.

== Bibliography ==
- Chan Vitharin, Preap Chanmara - Kbach (A study of Khmer ornament), February 2005, Reyum Publishing, ISBN 1-58886-076-0
- Polkinghorne, Martin (2009). "The Artists of Angkor: contemporary and medieval stone workshops in Cambodia". TAASA Review. 18 (4): 10–12. ISSN 1037-6674.
