= Channy Chhoeun =

Cambodian visual artist biography

Channy Chhoeun (Khmer: ឆឿន ចាន់នី; born 1988) is a Cambodian visual artist.

== Biography ==
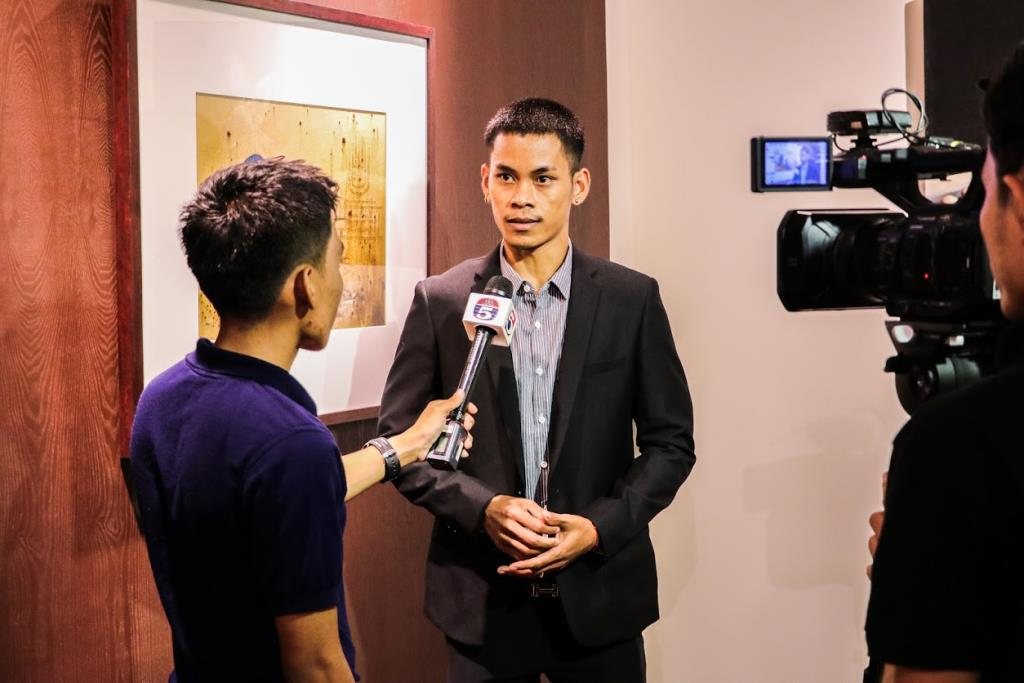
Cambodian visual artist Channy Chhoeun being interviewed at his exhibit at Sofitel Phnom Penh

Channy Chhoeun was born in 1988 in Songkae District, Battambang province. In 1998, his family participated in a government relocation program designed to provide underprivileged families with land for agricultural purposes. They moved to a rural village at the border to Pursat, approximately 100 kilometers from Battambang.

As a young boy growing up in this new environment, Chhoeun found solace and expression in drawing. Using the dirt as his canvas and a stick as his tool, he developed a unique artistic style. His creativity allowed him to escape his surroundings and explore a world of imagination. This early talent did not go unnoticed, and Chhoeun's artistic abilities began to garner attention.

Due to a lack of nearby schools, Chhouen resumed his education past basic school in 1999 in Koas Krala district. Teachers at primary school often gave him rewards for his artwork, but it was his father who recognized his talent and potential. Chhouen had originally dropped out in the seventh grade to work and support his family, but when his father heard about a school that provided free education in Battambang called Phare Ponleu Selpak, Chhoeun was enrolled in 2006; he graduated in 2013.

Channy currently resides in Siem Reap, near Wat Athvea. He has been selected by Vivu Journeys to be included in their "Local Legends" program.

== Artwork, themes and techniques ==
Chhoeun is known for his vibrant acrylic paintings featuring wildlife, particularly birds. His work often explores the complex relationship between humans, birds, and the environment, highlighting the dangers faced by wildlife in the modern world.

Inspired by his childhood experiences, Chhoeun initially enjoyed hunting birds with a catapult. However, as he matured, he developed a deeper appreciation for the vulnerability of animals and the negative impact of human activities on their survival. This newfound awareness is reflected in his art.

Cambodian visual artist Nou Sary has described Chhoeun’s work as “beautiful at one glance but as you look at them longer, you will understand the numerous messages they are conveying.”

In addition to his works on canvas, Chhoeun has illustrated three children's books with the Sanloeuk Thmey Publishing House. In 2010, he attended an Illustrators' Workshop conducted by Room to Read Cambodia.

== Exhibits ==
- Raffles Grand Hotel d'Angkor: Jan - Jun 2025, "Wild Spirits, Sacred Symbols", solo exhibit
- The Gallerist, Phnom Penh: Jan 2024, “Spectrum of Nature”, group exhibit
- Sofitel Phnom Penh Phokeethra: Nov 2022 – Jan 2023, “The Long Eclipse“, solo exhibit
- ArtXchange, Seattle: May-Jul 2020, “Contemporary Cambodia“, group exhibit
- Sofitel Phnom Penh Phokeethra: Aug – Oct 2019, “Out of Control”, solo exhibit
- Le Meridien Angkor, Siem Reap: Nov 2018, “Perspectives”, Group exhibit
- Galerie Impressions, Paris: May 2018, “Phare, Lumiere des Arts”, group exhibit
- Rosewood, Phnom Penh: Jan – Mar 2018, “In the Balance”, group exhibit
- The Aviary, Siem Reap: Dec 2016, “Shelter”, solo exhibit
- Institute Francais, Phnom Penh: 2014, “Made in Battambang”, group exhibit
- US Embassy, Phnom Penh: 2012, “Mekong Life”, group exhibit
- Battambang University, Battambang: 2011, “Gender”, group exhibit
- Institute Francais, Phnom Penh: 2010, “Newly Rich”, group exhibit
- Institute Francais, Phnom Penh: 2010, “Cambodia Women Charcoal Portrait”, group exhibit
- Institute Francais, Phnom Penh: 2009, “Water Lily”, group exhibit
