= Hen Sophal =

Cambodian artist

Hen Sophal, born 1958 is a Cambodian artist noted for his contrasting black and white art often with social representations of contemporary society.

In 1985 he worked at Painting at the School of Fine Arts, in Phnom Penh, Cambodia and in 1987 won First prize in the National Exhibition of Cambodia.

== Style ==
Hen Sophal is known for his abstract paintings often portraying social themes and values, often negatively, several of his works have depicted the vices of the night. However he has also produced paintings based on his Buddhist beliefs, including Buddhist rituals, and rivers often with contrasting shades of light and dark with the meeting of day and night.

== Exhibitions ==
- 2001: "Arts and Culture for Peace" in Siem Reap, Cambodia.
- 2002: "Visions of the Future", Reyum, Phnom Penh, Cambodia.
- 2000: Painting and Sculpture exhibition at the Ministry of Culture and Fine Arts, Phnom Penh, Cambodia.
- 2000: "Modern Art" group exhibition, Sunway, Phnom Penh, Cambodia.
