= Yoeu Yanny =

Cambodian judge

Yoeu Yanny is a Cambodian judge. He was the investigating judge in the case of the death of Say Sophea in 1998 who was killed by the bodyguards of governor, later justice minister, Neav Sithong.
