= Peter L. Pond =

Peter Lawrence Pond
- The Reverend Peter L. Pond and his adopted son Arn Chorn-Pond in 1983.
- Born: February 13, 1933; Milford, Connecticut, United States
- Died: June 20, 2000 (aged 67); Providence, Rhode Island
- Education: Yale University, B.A. Yale Divinity School, D.D. Providence College, L.H.D.
- Occupations: Director and co-founder, Inter-Religious Mission for Peace in Cambodia; Executive Director, Cambodian Crisis Committee; Co-founder, Thai Friends Relief Foundation; Founder, Volunteers in Service of Puerto Rico
- Years active: 1956-2000
- Known for: Work with Cambodian refugees and orphans
- Spouse(s): Shirley Mason Pond, Karen Hampton Morris
- Children: Piper Scalabrin, Anna Pond, Jintana Pond, Jenni Seri, Peter J.L. Pond, Matthew Pond, Paul Wilson, Michael Pond Wilson, Peter Wilson, Rithy Ek, Arn Chorn-Pond, Kannarom Kem, Seihak C. Pond-Mao, Saroeun Hong, Dara Pond, Soneath Pond, Kim Pond, Nicholas Pond, Dara Kong, Sarmeth Chum Pond, Wanchai BunBanlu, Sunthorn Pond-Tor and Lakhana Seri.
- Parent(s): Joseph L. and Josephine Clark Pond
- Relatives: Edwin F. Stanton (stepfather), Pamela Goss (sister)

Reverend Peter Lawrence Pond (1933–2000) was a New England clergyman, activist and philanthropist who worked with Cambodian orphans on the Thai-Cambodian border. He was executive director of the Providence-based Cambodian Crisis Committee and was a co-founder of the Thai Friends Relief Foundation as well as the Inter-Religious Mission for Peace in Cambodia.

== Early career ==
Born to a prominent family in Milford, Connecticut on February 13, 1933, Pond was named after his ancestor, the explorer Peter Pond. He would later describe his childhood with his divorced father as "deprived of love" and said that this deprivation shaped his desire to help others. He attended the Rectory School and the Pomfret School and graduated from Yale in 1954 with a degree in American Studies. He entered Yale Divinity School in 1955 against his father's wishes.

He flew to Hungary as a divinity student in 1956 to establish a camp for children displaced by the violence of the Hungarian Revolution. After graduating in 1960 he worked with impoverished children in Puerto Rico and New England, in a program on gang violence run by the Indo-Chinese Advocacy Project. In order to raise additional funds for his programs, Pond worked as the Director for Resettlement at the Lutheran Immigration and Refugee Service, as a consultant for Lutheran Social Services of New England, as a consultant for the Peace Corps in Colombia and Chile and for VISTA on Navajo reservations in the US.

== Foundation of the Puerto Rican Peace Corps (later VESPRA) ==
In 1963 Pond founded a YMCA chapter in Aguirre, Puerto Rico that served the children of sugarcane cutters. At the request of Don Luis Muñoz Marín, the first elected Governor of Puerto Rico and his wife, Pond initiated in Cayey, Puerto Rico a chapter of the YMCA with the specific focus of finding ways to keep youth and young adults "civically occupied". This program was called YMCA-Cuerpo de Paz de Puerto Rico with an operational base in Henry Barracks, an old army post. The initial group of volunteers was composed of 200 community leaders, 40 university students, 25 teachers and 85 high school students. The group committed to work voluntarily in community development projects for 80 hours per month for a minimum of one year.

In the spring of 1965 Cuerpo de Paz de Puerto Rico was renamed Voluntarios en Servicio a Puerto Rico Asociados (VESPRA), after Pond sought and obtained funding from the Office of Economic Opportunity in Washington, D.C. As a result of Pond's efforts, a joint training session called VISTA/VESPRA I was conducted in Cayey where sixty community leaders and university students were trained and assigned to communities in Puerto Rico and the eastern United States. In the summer of 1966, Pond and his associates, together with the New York Society for Ethical Culture, co-sponsored the Encampment for Citizenship in Henry Barracks with participants from over 50 countries, where they learned the fundamentals of community development, self-government, and civic responsibilities. By 1967 Pond's efforts in fostering community development had moved into the slums of San Juan utilizing local leadership and volunteers from the universities. Systematization of the training program gave VESPRA national visibility.

== Work with Cambodian refugees ==
After his second divorce in 1976, Pond felt a desire to start over and decided in 1979 to move to Thailand, where his mother, Josephine Stanton, wife of Edwin F. Stanton, the first United States Ambassador to Thailand after World War II, was living at the time. Pond wanted to establish an "indigenous Peace Corps" in Thailand and met with members of the Thai Royal Family. But the plight of refugees fleeing Cambodia after the end of the Pol Pot regime caught his attention, and he went immediately to volunteer at Sa Kaeo Refugee Camp on the Thai-Cambodian border. "It was a suffering I had not known," Pond later recalled, "and I felt compelled to be a part of it. I had just never seen such a broken people as the Cambodian people. There was so much devastation, so much incredible sadness that I was crying and very shaken." (Note: Sheldon Whitehouse asserts, erroneously, that Pond helped refugees escape from Kampuchea during the Cambodian genocide.)

In June 1980 the Thai Government decided to forcibly repatriate thousands of refugees. Pond and the Preah Maha Ghosananda organized a protest against the forced repatriation of refugees from Sa Kaeo and Pond was imprisoned "in a shack filled with human excrement" for several days. When Queen Sirikit heard about how Pond had been mistreated by Thai soldiers, she ordered his release and made amends by offering him three wishes. Pond selected three Cambodian orphans, including the musician Arn Chorn-Pond, to take back to the US. After his release Peter asked the United Nations for permission to begin a foster care program in the US for Khmer orphans, but was refused because it was felt that it was more appropriate for the children to return to Cambodia.

In all, he adopted 16 Cambodian children, mostly orphans, including the musician Arn Chorn-Pond and Rhode Island's first Cambodian physician, Dr. Soneath Pond. He also worked with Thai street children in the Patpong section of Bangkok and provided food for detainees at the Suan Phlu Immigration Detention Center. In 1983 he was invited by Rosalynn Carter to join the White House's National Cambodian Crisis Committee, created in 1980 as a clearing house for donations and relief efforts. That same year Pond and the Maha Ghosananda visited Pope John Paul II to discuss ways of achieving peace in Cambodia. In April 1984, he was asked to testify before the United States House Committee on Foreign Affairs on the refugee situation in Thailand, along with Kitty Dukakis.

In 1989 Pond and the Maha Ghosananda founded the Inter-Religious Mission for Peace in Cambodia, a Bangkok-based project designed to bring monks and refugees together from all the refugee camps on the Thai-Cambodian border, including those run by the Khmer Rouge, to teach peace and nonviolence through Buddhism. As a result of his work, Pond received an honorary doctorate from Providence College in 1992.

Devoutly religious, Pond was at different times in his life a Lutheran, a Congregationalist, a Unitarian-Universalist, and a Roman Catholic.

== Attempted murder ==
Pond also assisted refugees in Khmer Rouge camps along the Thai-Cambodian border, and on June 23, 1989, as he was leaving the Khmer Rouge refugee camp Site 8 where he had been trying to establish a literacy program, two soldiers stopped Pond's car and demanded that Pond help recruit soldiers for the Khmer Rouge. When Pond refused they threatened him with a sawed-off shotgun and shot him twice, nearly killing him. In spite of this, he returned to work a few months later and continued until his death in 2000.

== The controversial man ==
Those who knew Peter Pond often had mixed feelings about him. Described as "Quixotic, obsessive, even fanatic in his quest" to save Cambodian orphans.

"One of those individuals who is single-minded of purpose that I think a lot of people find either intimidating or aggravating or downright bizarre. He has put himself on the firing line consistently, not just in front of bullets, but on the political firing line, with the US, the United Nations, volunteers, the Thai Government ... Peter's philosophy has basically been, 'To hell with the system.' If it is not serving these children, go around it, subvert it, do anything you need to, even if it means breaking the law, if it serves the cause. His means are not always politic or even polite, but he is so totally devoted to serving the Cambodian people, particularly the Cambodian children, I think he must be forgiven ..."

His adopted son Arn Chorn-Pond said of Pond, "Peter [is] very lonely himself ... People do not understand what he do. They think he wants something, but Peter don't want anything. What he does is from his heart. It is pure help. This guy is so simple we don't understand. It is so simple we make it complicated. Maybe we are so modern we can no understand pure love."
