= Oeur Sokuntevy =

Cambodian artist

Oeur Sokuntevy (born 1983) is a Berlin-based artist from Cambodia.

== Life ==
Brought up in the country region of Battambang where took up studies in Phare Ponleu Selpak art school, she learnt how to paint using oil and water colour as well as refining her pencil skills. In December 2007, she met Dana Langlois, a fellow artist who owned the java café and gallery who also let Oeur have her first show which she earned money from. In February 2008, she moved to Phnom Penh to become a professional artist. Her parents were not supportive of her career choice at the beginning with Sokuntevy saying in an interview that they threw all her art away, and instead wanted her to be a woman adhering to the traditional norms in Cambodia and therefore lived with her aunt. Later in 2015, Sokuntevy moved to Berlin with her husband to learn about the art there and meet other artists as well as to show people Cambodian living and culture through her painting.

== Art ==
Sokuntevy's art follows the surrealism movement. Although her art takes a modern approach, some elements of appreciation of traditional Cambodian art can be found in her work such as her use of bold shapes and color. At first however while she lived in Battambang, although the medium she used, coffee with paper, was unique, the ideas she depicted were traditional. When she moved to Phnom Penh in 2007, her experiences with people, learning a different language, and travelling led her to morph her style into a surrealism approach. Sokuntevy's art depicts things and situations found in everyday life and according to her, "what is happening here" such as families, women and the limitations faced by them in Cambodia, life in Cambodia, and Khmer values with a satirical take. Tevy's used medium nowadays are paint however she has experimented with different mediums such as sculptural works made from rattan, bamboo, coffee, paint and homemade paper in her second solo exhibition in 2007.

== Themes in Sokuntevy's art ==
Throughout all her painting and exhibitions, Sokuntevy expresses a theme. In her exhibition Ping vey, the theme Tevy's understanding of the "Cambodia of today". Lost together is an art work from the exhibition titled Ping Vey. The painting depicts a man and a woman in the form of pigs which is a reference to Sokuntevy's Zodiac sign. They are standing on a balcony and looking into the distance, portraying a married couple having some quality time together. According to Calvin Yang, writer at the Phnom Penh Post, a closer look at the facial expressions of this couple reveals a grim expression that might, in his opinion portray the loathing an bitterness in the marriage. A string attached from the husband's snout to the wife's snout depicts an attachment which Sokuntevy explains as "When there is marriage, there is a connection between both parties" and "five to ten years later, the connection is still there but they lose the feelings they had for each other." According to Sokuntevy, this painting reflects what Tevy sees as having different view on marriage then her parents.

In another exhibition titled "free and easy" Sokuntevy uses the theme of Cambodia's views on homosexuality. Her paintings show a variety of homosexual love from the tender to the graphic with Sokuntevy stating that "In Cambodia no one knows about men with men, they think its dirty" and further explaining her views. "I was shocked when I first saw them too, but I don't think they're wrong, they can love each other too." In 2012, Sokuntevy created an exhibition titled Fantasies and in this exhibition the theme is the life of women in Cambodia juggling their desires, obligations whilst facing never ending demands from society. "I feel the situation between the men and women is a bit unfair: women have to work, cook, and take care of the children; and men sometimes have it easier" explains Sokuntevy as to why the theme was prevalent in this exhibition. Notable paintings from this exhibition include Never Enough and Fantasy. In Never Enough a woman is depicted in a Cambodian traditional dress making flavored shaved ice whilst several open hands face her expecting to be fed. In Fantasy, a poor woman inhabiting a wooden house in the rural areas is dreaming of wearing provocative lingerie.

== Exhibitions and paintings ==
Sokuntevy's first exhibition was in 2007 at the Java Café in Phnom Penh, entitled Ancient Spirits. On paper soaked in coffee, Oeur tried to "repair the past" by using torn pieces from old temple paintings and using glue to stick them together.

In 2010, at the Institute Francaise, Sokuntevy displayed her second exhibition called Love to Death, challenging social norms in relation to love from the perspective of women. A year later in 2011, another exhibition, titled "Love, Death, and Dream", at utterly art, the main medium used is acrylic on paper. In this exhibition, superstitions and traditions of Cambodia were explored through her subconscious. Images of animals were constantly used which represent Cambodia's deep relation with nature, belief in the reincarnation, and the zodiac sign.

Sokuntevy returned to Java gallery with a new exhibition named Ping Vey in 2012. The main character in this series was a pig (a reference to the zodiac signs) and the main representation is a psychological terrain. The fluctuations experienced by the character are emotional ones such as dreams, fears, and longing and are represented in scenes through symbolism and references. Sokuntevy explained the exploration of psychological terrain as "a shift that is not restricted by gender and can resonate with many stages in life. The same year, Oeur creates a second exhibition titled fantasies. Through heavy surrealism, a women's psyche was explored through the painting. The exhibition was a culmination of the fears, desire and wishes of females as well as a personal narrative that extended to a wider one. In this exhibition paintings included a woman offering her husband for sale, a woman enhancing her lips and breasts, and a woman caught in the nightmare of raising a sick child. Through this exhibition there was an exploration of the intersection of desire and obligation, a conflict and a burden.

In 2017 Sokuntevy created an exhibition called Cambodia Berlin that is still ongoing till this day. This exhibition was created after Sokuntevy moved to Berlin with her husband and is at Schillepallais. The paintings in this exhibition depict Oeur's experience in a foreign land through painting everyday activities such as taking the public transport and shopping. The paintings aim to bring together two different cultures by showcasing their similarities and differences as well as aid Sokuntevy in finding her place in a foreign country. Notable artwork from the exhibition include Waiting spring in which "three women sit on public benches floating in space, each one focused on her phone or lost in her thoughts. A fourth sit nearby casually holding her dog's leash, both dog and mistress wearing sunglasses. The dog is the only one with eyes on the viewer," and City Life Berlin which depicts "people rush to climb into a bus, obviously cold in their sweaters and scarves. The top of the bus becomes a surreal scene of people having coffee or casually working on computers with their torsos turning into a multicolor mist."
