= Ngoun Chhay Kry =

Cambodian politician

Ngoun Chhay Kry is the former minister for public works and telecommunications of Cambodia.
