= Chhoen Rithy =

Cambodian artist

Chhoeun Rithy (born 1965) is a noted Cambodian artist best known for his art deco paintings on buildings and modernist structures in Phnom Penh.

== Exhibitions ==
- 2005: "Identities versus Globalisation", Berlin, Germany.
- 2004: "Identities versus Globalisation", Bangkok, Thailand.
- 2004: "Identities versus Globalisation", Chiang Mai, Thailand.
- 2002: "Visions of the Future", Reyum, Phnom Penh, Cambodia.
- 2000: "Arts and Culture for Peace", Silpakon University, Bangkok, Thailand.
- 2000: "Modern Art" group exhibition, Sunway, Phnom Penh, Cambodia.
- 1998: "80 Anniversary of The Plastic Arts University" at the Royal University of Fine Arts, Phnom Penh, Cambodia.
