= Pea Reang District =

District in Prey Veng Province, Cambodia

Pea Reang ពារាំង
- District
- Pea Reang District ស្រុកពារាំង
- Location in Cambodia
- Coordinates: 11°40′N 105°11′E
- Country: Cambodia
- Province: Prey Veng

Government
  - District Administrator: Chem Pra

Population (1998)
  - Total: 107,958
- Time zone: UTC+7 (ICT)
- Postal code: 141209
- Geocode: 1408

Pea Reang (Khmer: ពារាំង, pronounced [piə.rĕəŋ]) is a district located in Prey Veng Province, in south eastern of Cambodia.
