= Geraldine Cox =

Australian founder of a Cambodian orphanage

Geraldine Cox AM
- Born: Geraldine Dorothea Cox c. 1945; Adelaide, Australia
- Citizenship: Cambodia, Australia
- Occupations: Founder and president of Sunrise Cambodia
- Website: sunrisecambodia.org.au

Geraldine Dorothea Cox AM (born c. 1945) is the founder of Sunrise Cambodia, a charity that was originally established as an orphanage in the province of Kandal, in Cambodia, and now extends its services to sustainable development and family support in several provinces of the country. She was granted Cambodian citizenship by a royal decree from King Norodom Sihanouk in 1999, around the time that she founded the orphanage. Cox remained at the helm of Sunrise Cambodia until September 2022, when she handed over to ABC journalist Tracey Shelton.

== Early life and family ==
Born around 1945 in the foothills of Adelaide, Geraldine Cox had two older sisters, and described herself the "problem child" of the family. Her Father, Norm Cox, was a milkman and her mother Dorothy Cox was a homemaker. Geraldine left school at age 15 and worked in several secretarial jobs in Adelaide. In 1964 she had a year abroad in Europe, and worked as a secretary in a London office.

== Career and humanitarian work ==
After moving to Coober Pedy to work as a miner in 1969, Cox began her career at the age of 25 working for the Department of Foreign Affairs in 1970. Her first overseas posting was to Phnom Penh in 1971. The country was in turmoil at the time, with the Vietnam war at the border and American B52 planes dropping bombs. Her following overseas postings included working for Australian Embassies in Manila (1973-1978), Bangkok (1978-1981), Tehran and Washington D.C. After resigning from the government in 1987, Cox worked for eight years at the Chase Manhattan Bank in Sydney.

Cox's original experiences in Cambodia never left her, and while in Australia in 1993, she helped found the Australia Cambodia Foundation, which operates Sunrise Cambodia today. She moved to Cambodia permanently in 1995 where she worked as an Executive Assistant for the Cabinet Director in the Cabinet of the then First Prime Minister of Cambodia, HRH Prince Norodom Ranariddh. In her spare time she assisted Princess Marie, wife of Prince Norodom, in operating and supporting a residential education centre for orphaned children. When a military coup occurred in July/August 1997, Cox realised her position of responsibility in looking after the children of the orphanage, as Princess Marie and her political associates had fled the country to save themselves. Within the orphanage she became widely known to the children as "M’Day Thom" (meaning Big Mum).

Austcare contacted Cox to be the keynote speaker at their October 1997 Refugee Week in Australia. After delivering this speech at the National Press Club in Canberra Geraldine's media profile gained much more public exposure and she began appearing in radio and TV segments to talk about her cause.

In September 2022, at the age of 77, Cox handed leadership of Sunrise Cambodia over to former ABC journalist Tracey Shelton.

In March 2025 Geraldine Cox was appointed Chairperson of charity, Cows For Cambodia Organisation.

== Book ==
Cox is the author of the book Home is Where the Heart Is, an account of her life and the lives of some of the children she has cared for, published in 2000.

== Film ==
Cox is the subject of the documentary My Khmer Heart, made by Australian filmmakers Janine Hosking and Leonie Lowe. This documentary won the Hollywood Film Festival Documentary of the Year Award in 2000 and has since been screened by HBO and Discovery Channels.

== Personal life ==
After Cox found that she was unable to bear children of her own, she adopted a baby daughter, Lisa, from a Cambodian orphanage in 1971. However she learned early on that Lisa was profoundly mentally and physically ill, suffering from deafness, epilepsy and diabetes. She cared for the child throughout her infancy and early childhood, giving her up after seven years to a full-time care centre in Adelaide.

Theo Palaxides was her boyfriend and long-time partner in Adelaide, and they remain friends after ending their relationship long ago. Major On Kon, a Cambodian fighter pilot, became her romantic partner during her posting in Phnom Penh in 1972. In 1984 Cox married Mahmoud Rastegar, an Iranian national who worked as an IBM project manager. Rastegar relocated with Cox on her posting to Washington, D.C. in 1984, but they ended their marriage in 1990.

== Awards ==
In January 2001 Cox was made a Member of the Order of Australia "For service to the welfare of children through the establishment, financing and administration of an orphanage in Cambodia." She has also received the Centenary Medal, "For service to the welfare of children in Cambodia".

Other awards and accomplishments include:

- 1999: granted Cambodian citizenship by a royal decree from King Norodom Sihanouk (1999)
- Member of the Humanitarian Affairs Advisory Board, 2014-2016
- Member of the board of Oasis Africa Australia (2013–?)
- 2012: Ernst & Young South Australian Entrepreneur of the Year Award
- Royal Order of Sahametrei Medal awarded by the Prime Minister of Cambodia Hun Sen, the most significant award given to foreigners
- 2011: Sir Edward ‘Weary’ Dunlop AsiaLink Medal
- Invited by Australia Network (the international cable channel run by the ABC) to become an Ambassador for the promotion of the channel and its programs
- 2006: Named Paul Harris fellow by the Rotary Foundation
- 2000: Circle of Courage Award from Australian charity Youth Off the Streets

== Criticism and Controversy ==
Cox's model of institutional care has faced sustained criticism from child protection experts and former supporters, who argue that for many years Sunrise Cambodia separated children from poor but functioning families rather than providing family support.

A 2011 UNICEF stated the number of orphanages in Cambodia had increased by 75 per cent and the number of children in institutional care had nearly doubled, despite nearly 80 per cent of those children having at least one living parent. The report concluded that poverty, not orphanhood, was the primary driver of institutionalisation, and that many families had been persuaded to give up their children with promises of food or cash payments.

A prominent critic of Cox is Tara Winkler, who had initially set up her own orphanage with Cox's support. Winkler discovered that most children in Cambodian orphanages, including some of those she had rescued, were not orphans but had living parents who were unable to care for them due to poverty. She subsequently closed her orphanage and transitioned to a family-reunification model, stating: "The orphanage I had set up was actually part of the problem." Winkler publicly called for all orphanages in Cambodia to be shut down. In response, Cox told the ABC that she was "hurt and disappointed" by Winkler, but acknowledged that she had only begun returning children to their families 18 months prior (around late 2014) — at least two years after Winkler had done so. Cox said this change was driven by new Cambodian government regulations and the 2011 UNICEF report, adding: "Whether I should have started the reintegration program earlier than I have done is probably not something we should talk about."

2016 The Sydney Morning Herald described the "dark underbelly" of Cambodia's orphanage industry, criticising what it called "poverty porn and pity charity" — the use of images of destitute children and their labelling as sex-workers to attract donations. In a campaign that has raised mor then $200.000 in Australia a certain ‘Pisey’ figured as a sex-worker, to be saved by the campaign, but it turned out that the person portrayed had a different name and is a village girl whom Sunrise Cambodia paid to be the poster-girl for its campaign. Critics say this is unethical, because the photograph portraying her as a sex worker will remain on the internet and in the public domain forever.
