= SreyRam Kuy =

Cambodian american surgeon

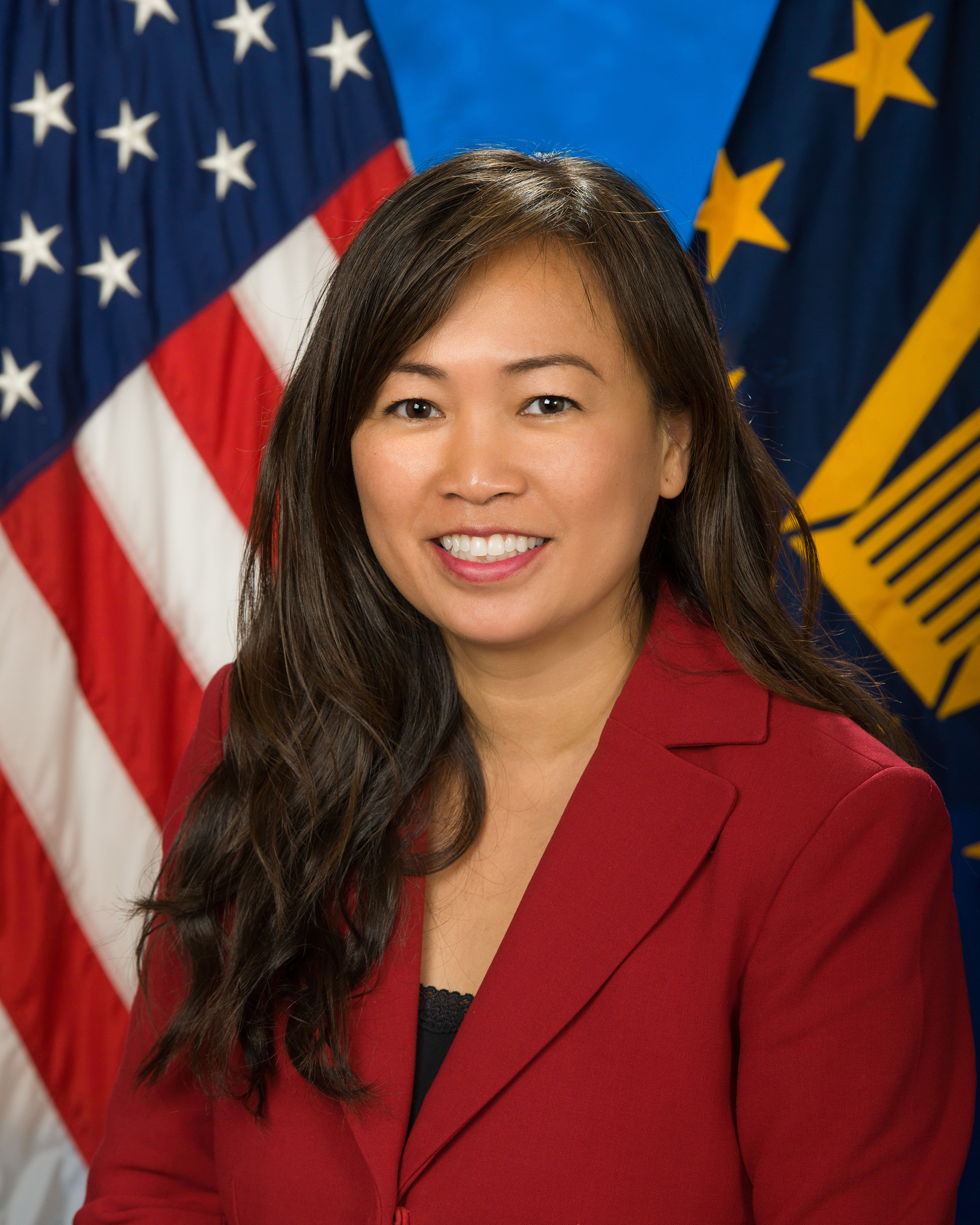
- Education: Oregon Health & Science University (M.D.); Yale School of Medicine (M.H.S.)

SreyRam Kuy is a Cambodian American surgeon, writer, researcher, and healthcare executive.

== Early life ==
SreyRam Kuy was two years old when she and her family escaped Cambodia and the Khmer Rouge Killing Fields. She along with her mother and sister were severely injured during a bombing in a border refugee camp in Thailand, and treated for wounds by a Red Cross volunteer surgeon, which inspired her to later become the first female Cambodian refugee to work as a surgeon in the United States. In 1981, she and her mother and sister moved to the United States.

== Education ==
Dr. Kuy obtained her B.S. degree in Philosophy and B.S. degree in Microbiology from Oregon State University, then completed her M.D. degree from Oregon Health & Science University in Portland, Oregon. She completed her residency in general surgery at the University of Texas Health Sciences Center at San Antonio and the Medical College of Wisconsin in Milwaukee. She completed her master's degree at the Yale School of Medicine as a fellow of the Robert Wood Johnson Clinical Scholars Program and the Brandeis leadership program for health policy and management at the Heller School for Policy and Management.

== Career ==
From 2014 to 2016 SreyRam Kuy worked at the Overton Brooks Veterans Affairs Medical Center as Director of the Center for Innovations in Quality, Outcomes and Patient Safety and Assistant Chief of the General Surgery Section, where she led efforts to decrease surgical mortality, improve healthcare quality and increase access to care for veterans.

Dr. Kuy served from 2016 to 2017 as Chief Medical Officer for Medicaid for the state of Louisiana. During this period, she led efforts tackling the opioid epidemic in Louisiana, including enacting Medicaid policies to align opioid prescribing to CDC guidelines, resulting in a 40% reduction in opioid prescriptions among Louisiana Medicaid patients.

In 2017, Dr. Kuy was appointed associate chief of staff at the Michael E. DeBakey Veterans Affairs Medical Center in Houston. From 2017-2018, Kuy served as Special Advisor to the Secretary of Veterans Affairs under both David Shulkin and Peter O'Rourke. In 2018 Dr. Kuy became the first woman appointed Deputy Under Secretary for Health for Community Care. Dr. Kuy currently cares for veterans as a surgeon at the Michael E. DeBakey Veterans Affairs Medical Center.

Dr. Kuy taught as an Assistant Professor of Surgery at Louisiana State University - Shreveport, then Associate Professor of Surgery at Louisiana State University - New Orleans, and later joined the faculty at Baylor College of Medicine.

Dr. Kuy has published contributions in the Los Angeles Times, USA Today, The Independent, Salon, Washington Post and Huffington Post. She has also published extensively on healthcare quality, patient safety and health policy in medical journals and is the author of the surgical textbook "50 Studies Every Surgeon Should Know", published by Oxford University Press.

== Awards ==
Since 2016, Dr. Kuy has been a Fellow of the American College of Surgeons and is a 2017 recipient of the American College of Surgeons' Mary Edwards Walker Inspiring Women in Surgery Award. In 2016, Kuy was named by Business Report a "Forty under 40", was awarded the "Caught in the Act Award" by RandomActs.org, and received the "Gerald E. Bruce Community Service Award" from the Ford Family Foundation. In 2017, Kuy was named a Presidential Leadership Scholar, was awarded the "Alumni Early Career Achievement Award" by Oregon Health & Sciences University School of Medicine, and was named a "Woman of Worth" by L'Oreal Paris. In 2018, Kuy was named a "Daily Point of Light" by President George H. W. Bush's Points of Light Foundation, was selected to deliver the commencement keynote address in Dallas at the George W. Bush Institute, and was recognized as a "Minority Executive to Watch in Healthcare" by Modern Healthcare Magazine. In 2019, Kuy was profiled in the book "Listening to Leaders" by Pulitzer Prize winner William McKenzie and named an Aspen Institute Health Innovator. In October 2020, Dr. Kuy was named an Alumni Fellow by Oregon State University, her alma mater.
