= Ros Serey Sothea =

Cambodian singer (c. 1948–c. 1977)

Ros Serey Sothea រស់ សេរីសុទ្ធា
- Sothea in the 1960s

Background information
- Born: Ros Sothea; 1948; Voat Ko, Battambang, Cambodia
- Origin: Battambang, Cambodia
- Died: c. 1978 (aged 29–30) Democratic Kampuchea
- Genres: Khmer pop; psychedelic rock; garage rock; traditional Khmer; romvong; saravann; jazz; bossanova; Afro-Latin; blues; cha cha cha; a go go; film
- Occupations: Singer; paratrooper; actress
- Years active: 1964–1975
- Labels: Angkor; Apollo; Apsara; Bayon; Blue Star; Bokor; Cambodia; Chadomuk; Chanchhaya; Hanuman; Independance; Monorom; Phnom Penh; Phnom Pich; Sakura; Thas Meas; Wat-Phnom
- Spouses: Sos Math (m. 1965; div. 1965); Huy Siphan (m. 1966)
- Website: www.thecvma.org/singers

Ros Sothea (Note: Khmer: រស់ សុទ្ធា, romanized: Ruăh Sŏtthia; [rŭəh sot.tʰiə]) (c. 1948–1978), known as Ros Serey Sothea, (Note: Khmer: រស់ សេរីសុទ្ធា, romanized: Ruăh Serei Sŏtthia; [rŭəh seː.rəj sot.tʰiə]) was a Cambodian singer. She was the most prominent female artist in the Cambodian rock scene during the First Kingdom of Cambodia and into the Khmer Republic period. She sang in a variety of genres; romantic ballads emerged as her most popular works. Despite a relatively brief career she is credited with singing hundreds of songs. She also ventured into acting, starring in a few films. She disappeared during the Khmer Rouge regime of the late 1970s but the circumstances of her fate remain a mystery. Norodom Sihanouk granted Sothea the honorary title "Queen with the Golden Voice."

== Biography ==
=== Early life ===
Ros Sothea was born in 1948 to Ros Bun (Khmer: រស់ ប៊ុន) and Nath Samien (Khmer: ណាត់ សាមៀន) in Battambang province, French protectorate of Cambodia. Growing up relatively poor on a farm, Ros Sothea was the second youngest of seven children; two of her younger sisters, Ros Sareth and Ros Saroeun, both died in 1955 at very young ages. Her older sisters Ros Saboeut and Ros Saboeun became activists after the Khmer Rouge working with surviving artists to combat piracy.

Ros Saboeun recalls Sothea displaying vocal talent as early as three years old. Sothea grew up listening to early Cambodian pop singers like Mao Sareth and Chhoun Malay on the radio and traditional singers during weddings, imitating their voices by ear. Furthermore, as a child her mother used to lull her and her siblings with Lakhon Bassac songs to sleep, Sothea would record a rendition of her mother's lullaby with the composer Voy Ho titled "បំពេ [Lullaby]" later in her career. In 1954, Sothea’s father divorced her mother after being lured into an affair by a woman named Roeuth, but Sothea’s parents remarried shortly after. During the late 1950s, Sothea and her siblings created a four-piece folk band using homemade and traditional instruments. Sothea, who was on vocals, earned the moniker ‘mey rey’, by the village elders and the band was known enough to perform for a district clerk's housewarming party. In 1960, Sothea joined her school’s singing club. Along with this, she was involved in sports curricular such as running which would carry on as a hobby throughout her life.

Due to a tight financial situation in the family, Sothea joined a popular regional singing contest in 1963. She ended up winning first place amongst around fifty other contestants. After the contest she became widely known throughout Battambang and was occasionally invited to sing at events. During one of these events, an incident occurred involving Sothea, and she dropped out of school. However she was encouraged to continue and joined the ayai troupe Lomhea Yothea. To dismiss bad luck she adopted ‘Serey’ into her alias. Lomhea Yothea regularly performed at the Stung Khiev restaurant in Battambang, a popular performance venue. Artists from Phnom Penh who toured there heard of Sothea’s talents and eventually word spread back in the capital. In 1964, Ma Laopi, after listening to Sothea’s voice, invited her along with Lomhea Yothea for an opportunity to sing for the National Radio in Phnom Penh. It is believed that popular singers Sinn Sisamouth, Im Song Soeum, as well as Saram Pak (a popular ayai singer) were involved with the scouting.

=== Music career ===
In Phnom Penh, she lived with her mother at Sala Pov Om—a boarding house and private school in Toul Kork—where other new artists such as Huoy Meas lived temporarily before they settled at their own places. She met the composer Peou Sipho who trained her to sing a few songs with the National Radio orchestra as well as Sinn Sisamouth who taught her musical notation. That same year, in 1964, she debuted with her first hit song “ស្ទឹងខៀវ [Blue River]” at the highly acclaimed biannual National Congress festival and quickly became popular across Cambodia, particularly for her high and clear voice. Eventually she became a regular partner with Sinn Sisamouth, the era's leading singer, resulting in many popular duet recordings. She also collaborated with other prominent singers of the era like Pen Ran, Huoy Meas, Im Song Soeum, Chea Savoeun, and others while maintaining an active solo career as well.

Sothea's early recordings were largely traditional Cambodian ballads and chanson-style ramvong songs such as the duet with Im Song Soeum, “ខូចខ្លួនខូចប្រាណ [Forsaken Love]”. She initially sung for record labels such as Chanchhaya and Cambodia. Apart from performing with the National Radio orchestra, she was also apart of the Société Khmer des Distilleries (SKD) band alongside Pen Ran. This band was among many industry mascot bands in Cambodia aimed at promoting the country’s industrial development and their respective sectors.

She was in the SKD band for six months until she adopted a crammed schedule—by her manager known as Mr. Sok—of at least two gigs every night. The venues she frequented were the Magasin d’état (known as the Magetat), Lotus d’Or, Mekong, and the Baler restaurant. In a 1974 interview with Réalités cambodgiennes she said she was able to perform at all the dancehalls in Phnom Penh before the 1970 coup. Throughout her career she mainly recorded at the National Radio's studios, Mekong studio, and Van Chan studio. She moved into a permanent two-story home near the former Phnom Penh International Airport, where she frequently practiced duets with Sinn Sisamouth. She would eventually record with many more record labels such as Apsara (commonly known as Lac-Sea) and adopt a more contemporary style incorporating French and American influences, adding western pop/rock instrumentation, as was common in Cambodian music starting in the late 1960s.

Eventually Sothea and her contemporaries were strongly influenced by American radio that had been transmitted to U.S. troops in nearby South Vietnam, inspiring experimentation with American and British rock and soul sounds. Sothea combined her high and clear voice with backing provided by young rock musicians, characterized by prominent electric guitars, drums, and Farfisa organs. This resulted in a sound that is often described as psychedelic or garage rock, and Sothea became the leading female singer in the thriving Cambodian rock scene. Sothea was also one of many singers in that scene to cover popular western rock songs with Khmer lyrics, such as "ប្រុសៗយំស្រឡាញ់ [Cry Loving Me]" (based on "Proud Mary" by Creedence Clearwater Revival), "រាំចង្វាក់ [Dance to the Rhythm" (based on "Wooly Bully" by Sam the Sham), and songs by The Carpenters and many others.

Romantic ballads would remain her most endearing work amongst the more conservative populace such as “ទឹកអូរយ៉ាដាវ [Oyadav Creek]”. She preferred performing slow ballads over rhythmic songs. She was often sought out by film directors to perform songs in their movies. Her first film project was a minor role in Sun Bunly’s 1966 film “អាសូរប្រពន្ធផង [Please Have Sympathy For Your Wife]”. Her first song for a film soundtrack was a duet with Sinn Sisamouth in 1967 titled "ស្នេហាលក្សិណវង្សព្រាហ្មណ៍កេសរ [The Love of Leak Sinavong and Pream Kesor]" for the film "ព្រះលក្ខសិនវង្សនាងព្រាហ្មណ៍កេសរ [Leak Sinavong and Pream Kesor]". Her first major role was in Sinn Sisamouth’s 1973 film “ចម្រៀងឥតព្រាងទុក [The Unplanned Song]” where she played the role of a singer. Additionally, Sothea and Sisamouth had toured various cinemas to perform live before the movie screened. Her song “ឆ្នាំអូន១៦ [I Am 16]”—her biggest hit as of early 1974—had been so popular that a movie by Chea You Than was named and based on it in 1971.

Aside from these projects she recorded numerous other songs for movie soundtracks, including foreign films, and acted in a few other films, although no footage has been recovered as of today. Sothea's collaboration with the Cambodian film industry is invaluable in identifying over 250 films lost during the Khmer Rouge regime. Sothea never sang under any one record label due to being a freelance artist—common for virtually all popular singers in Cambodia during that time—and made a modest living as a musician. She was also known as a fashion icon and occasionally modeled, one of which events taking place Kep in 1964 that has remained as one of the very few footages of her to have survived. In 1969, she was recognized as a national treasure and was honored by Head of State Norodom Sihanouk with the royal title of Preah Reich Theany Somlang Meas, the "Queen with the Golden Voice" (sometimes translated as "Golden Voice of the Royal Capital").

During the Cambodian Civil War after the 1970 Cambodian coup d’état, the government shut down the Magetat and other nightclubs due to imposed curfews. Around this time Sothea joined the Khmer National Armed Forces under the 1st Airborne Division’s orchestra, she never was involved in combat but performed on the frontlines to entertain resting soldiers. Around September 1971 she completed a six week training course to become a paratrooper in Kamboul bordering Kampong Speu along with her brother Ros Sokunthea and her sister Ros Sophean, and received a parachutist badge in 1973. Sothea also continued to record music, including many of her most famous works around this time, as well as patriotic songs supporting the Republic's stance against the Khmer Rouge insurgents. Her last known public performance was in Pailin for a provincial celebration shortly before the Khmer Rouge. Her career would continue until the Khmer Rouge captured Phnom Penh in April 1975.

=== Personal life ===
Ros Sereysothea – Chnam oun Dop-Pram Muy
Sample from Ros Sereysothea – Chnam oun Dop-Pram Muy from the compilation Cambodian Rocks

Ros Sereysothea's personality has been described as modest, gentle, and reserved. A popular belief is that Sothea grew up impoverished, illiterate, and sold boiled snails on the street. However, her sister Saboeun widely refutes these beliefs stating that an author named Seng Dara had popularized these claims in order to paint Sothea's life as a 'rags to riches' story.

Ros Saboeun - My mother had a rice field and she also ran a small business from the house, selling things. We [children] worked on the rice, and we all went to school until we received our high school diplomas. I made it to year ten and Sereysothea—or "Sothea" as we called her in our family—made it to year eight. There was enough money to support the children to do this. My father never let us succumb to selling snails for money, or anything like that.

— Dee Peyok, Away From Beloved Lover, Old Pot Still Cooks Good Rice

Sothea was a quite athletic person stating in an interview that she enjoyed running, badminton, and jump rope. For her interest in the fashion scene, she liked wearing traditional sampot hol and sampot phamuong, modeling with those garments as well. Sothea is also known to have been involved in a few high-profile relationships. As documented in the film Don't Think I've Forgotten, when she arrived in Phnom Penh in 1964, she was courted by fellow singer Sos Math and they eventually married in 1965. As Sothea's career moved forward, Sos Math became jealous of her success and of the men who came to watch her perform, culminating in physical abuse. After an alleged altercation between the two at the Lotus D'or nightclub, Sothea fled the six month long marriage and obtained a divorce. Ros Saboeun, has never gone too far into detail about the situation and has alleged it happened due to various reasons.

Dee Peyok - Saboeun was afraid to talk to me about the reported affairs and domestic abuse Sothea allegedly suffered at the hands of her husband, for fear of reprisal from Sos Mat's son and family. But speak to anyone and they will all say the same thing of Sothea: her love life was, for the most part, full of heartache and violence. 'I feel bad for my sister, who encountered so much bad love and all this mess,' Saboeun told me, lowering her gaze. 'Sothea had money but she had bad love and bad husbands.'

— Dee Peyok, Away From Beloved Lover, Old Pot Still Cooks Good Rice

Sothea, who believed that her career would be ruined by the stigma of divorce, went back to her family in Battambang to quit singing but was convinced by Sinn Sisamouth to return to Phnom Penh and resume her career. Sothea's popularity rebounded and she met Houy Siphan, the son of a prominent film and music producer Van Chan. This relationship led to marriage and the birth of a son named Sopanara. Throughout her life, Sothea had unfortunately been involved in multiple alleged instances of domestic violence and sexual assault. Ros Saboeun states that Sothea was raped multiple times by the military commander of Sothea's division by the name of Srey Ya during the early 1970s. He reportedly had gone so far as to have his troops kidnap her after she sang at a venue in Pochentong.

Ros Saboeun - 'And that is where Srey Ya raped Sothea,' she divulged in a detached tone, a bony finger pointing to an unkept grass verge at a nearby intersection. 'Sothea was kidnapped by Srey Ya's troops. He already had a wife but he kidnapped Sothea and forced her to have sex, and the wife accepted it, because his wife had three children and could no longer get pregnant.'

— Dee Peyok, Away From Beloved Lover, Old Pot Still Cooks Good Rice

Sothea's husband, Huoy Siphan, was threatened with death and intimidated by Srey Ya, so he fled to France although never formally divorcing Sothea. Srey Ya and Sothea went on to have three children together. Fans believe that Sothea's unhappy relationships were a primary influence on her singing style and lyrics, indicated by song titles (in translation) like "Don't Be Angry," "Brokenhearted Woman," and "Wicked Husband." Throughout her career, Sothea remained close-knit with her family members, she helped support their financial situations and flew back to Battambang on occasion to visit them. Sometimes, Sothea's sister would accompany her at work. However, travel to and from Battambang became increasingly disrupted for Sothea as the civil war progressed.

=== Disappearance and death ===
Ros Serey Sothea disappeared during the Khmer Rouge genocide, although her exact fate has never been confirmed. Shortly before Pochentong International Airport closed due to artillery attacks, Sothea and Pen Ran flew to Pailin to perform at a provincial celebration. Despite much of Cambodia ruined from the war, the proximity of Pailin to neighboring Thailand had allowed it to remain relatively peaceful and a stronghold for the Khmer Republic. Pailin did not have any curfews imposed so many businessmen who fled the capital had reopened their nightclubs and venues there. Sothea had returned to Phnom Penh nearing the fall of the city since her son, mother, and other relatives were there. Some sources also claim that the outgoing government made efforts to get Sothea out of the country.

When Phnom Penh fell, Ros Saboeun who was in Battambang stated that all she knows is Sothea was with her four children, mother, and Saboeun's two children. She had heard from a relative named Song Hong who met Sothea during the evacuation that Srey Ya had been taken away, presumably executed during the massacres at Olympic Stadium due to his high rank, and that Sothea and them were evacuated to Tro Pieng Tlong village in Kompong Speu. Along the way Sothea's three youngest children had died due to dehydration. There are various claims of how Sothea died, however her sister Saboeun deems the stories of her relative Song Hong, and another witness who went by Mao as the most reliable since their stories somewhat corroborate independently.

Ros Saboeun - I believe that Sothea was killed in Kampong Speu in 1978. After they got to Kampong Speu, a few days later, the new arrivals were given the option to carry on to where they were born, and Song Hong told me he went to Battambang. Sothea wanted to go back to Battambang but they [the Khmer Rouge] said, "You have to stay here and sing to the group." Another witness called "Mao" Tiv Heng... she had now passed away... told me that one day, at four o'clock in the afternoon when she came back to her house, they carried Sothea and her family on an ox cart and they were killed at the nearby pagoda called Chaom Sangkae pagoda, Phnom Srouch district in Kampong Speu province.'

— Dee Peyok, Away From Beloved Lover, Old Pot Still Cooks Good Rice

Other theories suggest Sothea, like most city dwellers, was likely relocated to the Cambodian countryside and was worked to death in forced labour in agricultural fields in Kampong Speu province. Having grown up on a farm, she was able to adjust to the work and conceal her identity for a time. According to testimonies from survivors who claimed to have known her at the time, she was eventually discovered, after which her husband was murdered and she was forced to marry a Khmer Rouge officer and perform communist songs regularly for the party leadership.

This story contends that her marriage to the officer was abusive and the party leadership determined that her presence was too controversial, so she was allegedly led away and executed in 1977. Regardless of all the claims, Saboeun and Sothea's surviving relatives acknowledge that they don't know her exact fate. Yet more sources claim that Sothea was able to stay put in a Khmer Rouge labor camp, and that she survived until the Vietnamese invasion of late 1978 or early 1979 but soon died in Calmette Hospital from malnutrition.

== Legacy ==
A Ros Serey Sothea record cover from the early 1970s

Practically all of Ros Serey Sothea's master recordings were either destroyed by the Khmer Rouge regime in its efforts to eliminate foreign influences from Cambodian society, or deteriorated rapidly in the tropical environment, no master tapes from any artist of the pre-genocide music era are known to have survived. The exact number of songs Sothea created are unknown, but she stated in an interview that she created hundreds. However, many vinyl records and cassette tapes have survived and have been reissued on cassette or compact disc. Many of the reissued recordings contained overdubs of drum machines and keyboards, and were sometimes sped up. Thus, the original recordings by Sothea and her contemporaries are highly sought by collectors and preservationists.

Sothea’s known relatives to have survived the Khmer Rouge include her father, Ros Sabun, who died in 1995, her older sister Ros Saboeut who died in 2014, and her eldest sister Ros Saboeun who died in 2026. Ros Saboeut is widely credited with reuniting Cambodia's surviving musicians and bands in the aftermath of the Khmer Rouge era. Surviving musicians had initially contacted Ros Saboeut to inquire about Sothea's fate; Saboeut used the opportunity to reunite the survivors. According to Youk Chhang, the executive director of the Documentation Center of Cambodia, Ros Saboeut sought to restore Cambodian music as a tribute to her sister, saying "I think she was bound by the legacy of her sister to help." Her efforts were widely credited with rebuilding the country's rock genre.

Ros Serey Sothea has remained extremely popular posthumously in Cambodia and Cambodian communities scattered throughout the United States, France, Australia, and Canada. Western listeners were introduced to her work starting in the late 1990s with the release of the Cambodian Rocks bootleg album, followed by the soundtrack to the film City of Ghosts. The Los Angeles band Dengue Fever, featuring Cambodian lead singer Chhom Nimol, covers a number of songs by Sothea and her contemporaries in the Cambodian rock scene, as does the band Cambodian Space Project. Sothea was the subject of the 2006 short film The Golden Voice, in which she is played by actress Sophea Pel. The film was written and directed by American filmmaker Gregory Cahill.

Ros Serey Sothea is also profiled extensively in the 2015 documentary film Don't Think I've Forgotten, in which several interview subjects describe her as one of the most important singers in the history of Cambodian popular music. The Cambodian Vintage Music Archive, a non-profit organization, has the largest collection of Sothea's music and has helped surviving artists and their relatives manage intellectual properties and receive royalties by uploading the artists' original records to various platforms. Sothea's life was chronicled in the 2023 non-fiction graphic novel The Golden Voice, written by Cahill with art by Kat Baumann.

== Partial discography ==
=== Rock ===
- "Chnam Oun Dap Pram Muoy" (I'm 16)
- "Bong Rau Roub Khnyom" (My love, embrace me)
- "Glass of Wine"
- "Cry Loving Me"
- "Kom Kung Twer Evey" (Don't Be Mad)
- "Hair Cut, Hair Cut"
- "Have You Seen My Love"
- "I'm So Shy"
- "Phey! Phey!" (Scared! Scared!)
- "Since When You Knew Me"
- "Wait Ten Months" (Jam 10 Kai Theit / "Wait 10 Months More")
- "Wicked Husband"
- "Mdech Ka Dar tam Khnhom?" (Why Do You Follow Me?)
- "Khlin Joep Nersa" (The Fragrant That Lasts With Me)
- "Rom Woolly Bully"
- "Bong Srolanh Oun Ponman Dae" (Tell Me How Much You Love Me)
- "Po Preuk Po Lngeach"
- "Penh Chet Tae Bong Muoy" (A Go Go)
- "Komlos Sey Chaom" (Love God)
- Jas Bong Ju Am
- Penh Chet Tae Bong Mouy (I Love Only You)

=== Romvong ===
- "Kaduk Dol Heuy"
- "Komping Puoy"
- "Rolum Saen Kraw"
- "Sarika Keo Kauch"
- "Tha Cho Chok"
- "Or! Champey Euy"
- "Leour So Skol Thoun"
- "Kae Rognea Heuy Me"
- "Pkah Lmeath"
- "Chong Ban Chea Kou Veasna"

=== Saravann ===
- "Sra Muy Keo" (One Shot)

=== Slow ===
- "Kaun Komsott"
- "Bopha Akasajal"
- "Jomno Pailin"
- "Kom Plich Oun Na"
- "New Year's Eve"
- "Pink Night"
- "Pga Reige Leu Maik"
- "Pruos Reing Awej?"
- "Lort sene duong chan"
- "Chross O'yadao"
- "Somnerng Bopha prey phnom" (Songs of the jungle girl)
- "Sralmall sene khyum" (Shadow of my love)
- "Chmreing sene khyum" (Story of my love)
- "Alay bong cher net" (Always misses you)
- "Teurk hoe teu" (River flow)
- "Bong ban sonyah" (You've promise)
- "Soum ros khbere bong"
- "Oun soum angvor" (I beg of you)
- "Oun neul tharl rong jum" (I will still wait)
- "Bomplej men ban" (Can't forget)
- "Oun smak bong smoss"
- "Oun sralnane bong nas" (I love you so much)
- "San nuk alay"
- "Men guor sralane bong" (I shouldn't love you)
- "Chup sralane men ban" (Can't stop loving you)
- "Jum neu tharl jum"
- "Oun jum bong cher neth"
- "Phnom Kong'rei" (Phnom Kong Rei)
- "Pros bondoll chiet"
- "Kum keng oun na bong"
- "Rom cha cha cha"
- "Jum loss sone"
- "Bong tver oy oun yum" (You made me cry)
- "Yume samrap thngay nis"
- "Sall anosaovary"
- "Leng knhom tv" (Let me go)
- "Bondam stung keiv"
- "Reastrei buth sene" (Missing lover of the night)
- "Pkah orchid"
- "Auh! seneha khnom"
- "Verjah boross" (The word of men)
- "Popol gomah"
- "Prot svamei"
- "Oun soum phneu chheung"
- "San klotpsa"
- "Chhba mon reing khyum"
- "Norok lokei" (The sin of man)
- "Ahso kasalmerlerr"
- "Rolok songka therm svamei"
- "Thmnorng leakina"
- "Thgnay lett oun sralnoss" (When the sun sets, I miss you)
- "Tropeang Peay"
- "San chok chem"
- "Pathchere sralnoss"
- "Konseng nisei"
- "Machass sne oun"
- "Jomreang avasan"
- Konsaeng Krohom" (Red Scarf)
- Bros Del K'bot Chet" (Man who betrays)
- Veal Srae Sronos"

=== Duets with Sinn Sisamouth ===
- "Ae Na Promajarey"
- "Bong Ban Khernh Sre"
- "Bos Choong"
- "Chom Chait Pesaey"
- "Chao Luoch Jet"
- "Have a Caramel"
- "Jang ban pka avey?" (What flower do you want?)
- "Kay Tha Knyom Jass"
- "Kamnap snaeha" (Love poem)
- "Komnoch veyo"
- "Pneik Kamhuoch"
- "Niw Tae Srolanh"
- "Oh! snaeha euy!" (Oh! Love...)
- "Oun Rom Som Te?"
- "Sranah Ou chrow"
- "Soniya 3 Tngai" (A Promise for 3 Days)
- "Tehsepheap Prolim"
- "Tiev Euy Srey Tiev"
- "Tmor Kol Sromol Snae"
- "Tok Bong Om Skat"
- "Yaop Yun Thun Trojeak"
- "Yerng Kom Plich Khnea"

=== Duets with Other Artists ===
- "Khmao Euy Khmao" (with Im Song Soeum-1972)
- "Kamlos Kromum Heu Ha" (with Im Song Soeum-1972)
- "Kamlos Kramom Srok Srae"
- "Hann Pnal Da Ey" (with Eng Nary)
- "Soll Tae Card"
- "Pka Sarai"
- "Srolanh Sok Krong (with Chea Savoeun)
