= Chhim Sothy =

Cambodian painter and sculptor (born 1969)

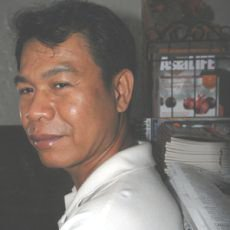
Sothy in 2012

Chhim Sothy (born 1969) is an acclaimed Cambodian painter and sculptor noted for his ability in a diverse number of artistic techniques and mediums.

== Background ==
Chhim Sothy was born in 1969 in Kandal Province.

Please Let There Be Peace, tempera on canvas

== Exhibitions ==
- 2005: Victoria Hotels and Resorts, Siem Reap, Cambodia.
- 2004: Fealac Art Exhibit Guidelines in Manila, Philippine.
- 2004: French Cultural Center Phnom Penh, Cambodia.
- 2004: Maison du Chevalier, Carcasonne, France.
- 2004: Ganesha Gallery, Phnom Penh, Cambodia.
- 2003: "Vision of Future", Reyum Gallery, Phnom Penh, Cambodia.
- 2003: 60th Celebration of Silapakorn University, Bangkok, Thailand.
- 2003: Le Royal, Raffles International Hotel, Phnom Penh, Cambodia.
- 2002: Providence College, Rhode Island, USA.
- 2002: French Cultural Center Siem Reap, Cambodia.
- 2002: National Cultural Center, Phnom Penh, Cambodia.

== Awards ==
- 2004: 1st prize of Painting (Future of Culture), Phnom Penh, Cambodia.
- 2003: 1st prize of Painting (Life and Nature), Ministry of Culture and Fine Arts, Phnom Penh, Cambodia.
- 2003: 2nd prize of "Utopies, Dream or Reality", French Cultural Center, Phnom Penh, Cambodia.
- 2000: 1st prize of traditional painting by the Plastic arts and Crafts Department, Phnom Penh, Cambodia.
- 2000: Asean Art Awards, Singapore, Phillip Moris Group
