= Arn Chorn-Pond =

Cambodian musician and activist

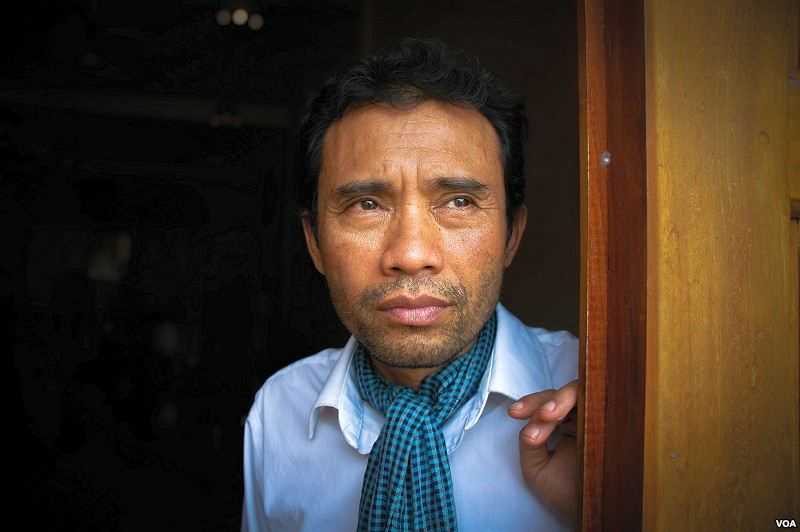
- Born: 1966 (age 59–60); Battambang, Cambodia
- Education: Gould Academy, Northfield Mount Hermon School, Providence College, B.A. (Political Science), L.H.D.
- Occupations: Musician and human rights activist
- Known for: Work with Cambodian refugees, trauma survivors, Khmer traditional musicians, education on forgiveness and reconciliation, education on the Khmer Rouge genocide
- Relatives: Peter L. Pond (foster father), Shirley Mason Pond (foster mother)
- Awards: Reebok Human Rights Award (1988); Amnesty International Human Rights Award (1991); Kohl Foundation International Peace Prize (1993); Spirit of Anne Frank Outstanding Citizen Award (1996)

Arn Chorn-Pond (Khmer: អាន ចន ផន, romanized: An Chân Phân; born 1966) is a Cambodian musician, human rights activist, and a survivor of the Khmer Rouge regime. He is an advocate for the healing and transformative power of the arts, and especially music.

== Biography ==
=== Early life ===
Chorn-Pond was born in Battambang in 1966 into a family of performers and musicians, as one of 12 children. According to Chorn-Pond in a 2006 article:

"My family owned an opera company. The National Charity Company, as we were called, performed in temples, opera houses and mayors’ compounds throughout the country. Many people knew my father, grandfather, and uncle through their performances, which had become legendary. Since the family ran the company, all of us performed. When I was six or seven, I often played the role of a baby. Somebody would say “Cry!” and I’d cry...My father and uncle trained my older cousin, in his teens at the time, to perform the main roles in traditional Cambodian operas."

=== Survival during the Pol Pot Regime ===
When the Khmer Rouge came to power in 1975, Chorn-Pond and hundreds of other children were sent to Wat Ek Phnom, a Buddhist temple near Battambang converted into a prison camp, where he survived by playing the flute and keeping the soldiers entertained.

In five days a master trained Chorn-Pond and four other children to play the khim, a Cambodian hammered dulcimer. The children learned to play a traditional lullaby known as Bombay. At the end of that time, Chorn-Pond and another boy were chosen to play propaganda songs for the camp guards. The other three children and the master were led away and killed. "When they brought in another old master for more lessons," Chorn-Pond recalled, "I begged them not to kill him. I told them I didn’t have enough skills yet, and I offered them my own life instead." On a visit to Cambodia in 1996, he was reunited with his teacher.

In a 2002 interview Chorn-Pond described how his survival depended on repressing his emotions and distancing himself from the horror of his situation:

"I was in a temple where they killed three or four times a day. They told us to watch and not to show any emotion at all. They would kill us if we reacted...if we cried, or showed that we cared about the victims. They would kill you right away. So I had to shut it all off...I can shut off everything in my body, practically, physically. I saw them killing people right in front of me, the blood was there, but I didn't smell it. I made myself numb...The killing was unbearable. You go crazy if you smell the blood."

When the Vietnamese invaded Cambodia in 1978, Chorn-Pond was handed a gun and forced to fight:

"The Khmer Rouge gave us guns and pushed us into the front line. Children who refused were shot in the head. Many of us ranged from eight [and] up, so long as we could carry guns. I was then about twelve. The Khmer Rouge would shoot us from behind if, against orders, we tried to leave the battleground. Thousands of children got shot to the left and right of me, many of them good friends."

"Many kids got killed because the Vietnamese are very good. Most of the Vietnamese soldiers had experience with Americans, and we didn't know that...And I became good friends with some of the kids, and on the battlefields sometimes they got shot in the left and the right from me, in the stomach and the head. Many times I held them, blood all over me. The worst feeling I had was that you can’t help them at all...I saw kids and adults got hit in the head, by the bullets, crawling. So I don't believe in crawling anymore. I just stood up and shoot like hell...I fought about two or three months. The thing that I couldn't take is to watch my friends dying every day. That's the worst feeling."

Eventually, he escaped into the jungle where he survived for months by himself. "I followed monkeys and ate whatever they ate. I fished with my hands and ate fruits, and killed monkeys, too." In late 1980 he crossed the border into Thailand and a Thai soldier took him to the Sa Kaeo Refugee Camp. There he met the Reverend Peter L. Pond. "He weighed about 60 pounds and he was very sick," Reverend Pond later recalled, "He had cerebral malaria and he was really close to death...This sick little child reached up and touched me, and said in English, 'Hello.' That...was Arn Chorn from the very first, reaching out and touching."

Reverend Pond took Arn to Jefferson, New Hampshire and formally adopted him in 1984. In all, Pond adopted 16 Cambodian children, mostly orphans, including one who eventually became Rhode Island's first Cambodian physician, Dr. Soneath Pond.

=== Education and humanitarian work ===
During his initial months in the US, Arn Chorn-Pond experienced difficulties as one of the first non-white students to attend White Mountains Regional High School. He graduated from Gould Academy in Maine in 1985, attended Northfield Mount Hermon School and attended Brown University for two years before withdrawing to co-found Children of War, an organization dedicated to help young people to overcome suffering from war and other traumas such as child abuse, poverty, racism and divorce. From its inception in 1984 through 1988, Children of War trained a core leadership group of 150 young people representing twenty-one countries. More than 100,000 U.S. students from 480 schools participated in the program. In 1992 Chorn-Pond received a bachelor's degree in political science from Providence College and in 2007 the school awarded him an honorary Doctorate of Humanitarian Service .

Chorn-Pond was also one of the few surviving Cambodians to return to the refugee camps on the Thai–Cambodian border. While attending college in Rhode Island, Arn devoted his summers from 1986 through 1988 to teaching and assisting those still displaced by war. He was also the youngest Cambodian involved in diplomatic efforts for reconciliation. While a student at Providence College, Chorn-Pond co-founded the Southeast Asian Big Brother/Big Sister Association in Providence and founded Peace Makers, a US-based gang intervention program for Southeast Asian youths in Providence. In 1993 he returned to Cambodia and founded the Cambodian Volunteers for Community Development.

In 1998 he founded the Cambodian Master Performers Program, which grew into Cambodian Living Arts. The organization's original mission was to revive the endangered traditional performing arts in Cambodia by locating former masters or trained professional musicians and helping them to pass on their skills and knowledge to the next generation. Cambodian Living Arts has since expanded its scope of programming to include scholarships, fellowships, workshops, training, commissions, arts education, and a cultural enterprise that provides enriching job opportunities to Cambodian performing artists.

Chorn-Pond remains engaged with the organization's work, both as spokesperson and in particular with the work of The Khmer Magic Music Bus, a program of Cambodian Living Arts that takes music performances and demonstrations to villages and communities around Cambodia which would otherwise lack access to performing arts, and also works closely with certain communities to keep some especially rare forms of Cambodian music alive. The program is managed by Cambodian co-founder Thorn Seyma, an internationally recognized performer and advocate for the arts. Working with her brother Thorn Dika, they plan, organize, promote, document, and perform at events throughout the country. In May 2013, the initial crowdfunding campaign raised $36,000 in 35 days from 362 supporters in 19 countries, which was used to pay for the bus and multiple tours with performances in every Cambodian province until 2018. As of 2025, the project has shifted to workshops with limited scope as they secure funding to start tours again.

Arn Chorn-Pond has also served as Director of Youth Programs for the Cambodian Mutual Assistance Association in Lowell, Massachusetts, and since 2001 has been a special adviser on Cambodian affairs for Clear Path International.

== Awards and honors ==
Among other honors, Arn Chorn-Pond was one of the first recipients of the Reebok Human Rights Award in 1988. He has received the 1991 Amnesty International Human Rights Award, the 1993 Kohl Foundation International Peace Prize, and the 1996 Spirit of Anne Frank Outstanding Citizen Award.

Arn Chorn-Pond regularly gives talks about his experiences. In October 2008, he was invited by the Spurlock Museum and the Asian Educational Media Service to the University of Illinois Urbana-Champaign.

In 2015, he spoke about his life on TEDx event at Warrick University.

He was nominated Music Rights Champion by the International Music Council in 2018.

== In film, opera and literature ==
Arn Chorn-Pond is the subject of Jocelyn Glatzer's 2003 documentary "The Flute Player."

The 2007 opera "Where Elephants Weep", composed by Khmer musician Him Sophy with a libretto by Catherine Filloux, is loosely inspired by the life of Arn Chorn-Pond.

The 2008 children's book A Song for Cambodia by Michelle Lord is based on events in the life of Arn Chorn-Pond.

In May 2012, the novel Never Fall Down by Patricia McCormick was published with HarperCollins. It retells Arn Chorn-Pond's childhood story of surviving during the Khmer Rouge regime.

In 2018, Arn Chorn-Pond starred in the film In the Life of Music along with Ellen Wong. The film tells the story of three generations that are connected through the song "Champa Battambang" by Sinn Sisamouth.

== As a musician ==
An accomplished flautist, Arn Chorn-Pond is credited with teaching Ron Korb to play the Khloy (the Cambodian bamboo flute) in traditional Khmer style. In 2001 Chorn-Pond performed on stage in Peter Gabriel's Tribute and Homage for Harbourfront Centre's "World Leaders" hosted by Laurie Brown, sharing the stage with Peter Gabriel, Jane Siberry, Tia Carrere, Ron Korb, Donald Quan, Jeff Martin, Andy Stochansky, Loreena McKennitt, Daniel Lanois and Lorraine Segato.
