= Meas Soksophea =

Meas Soksophea (មាស សុខសោភា)
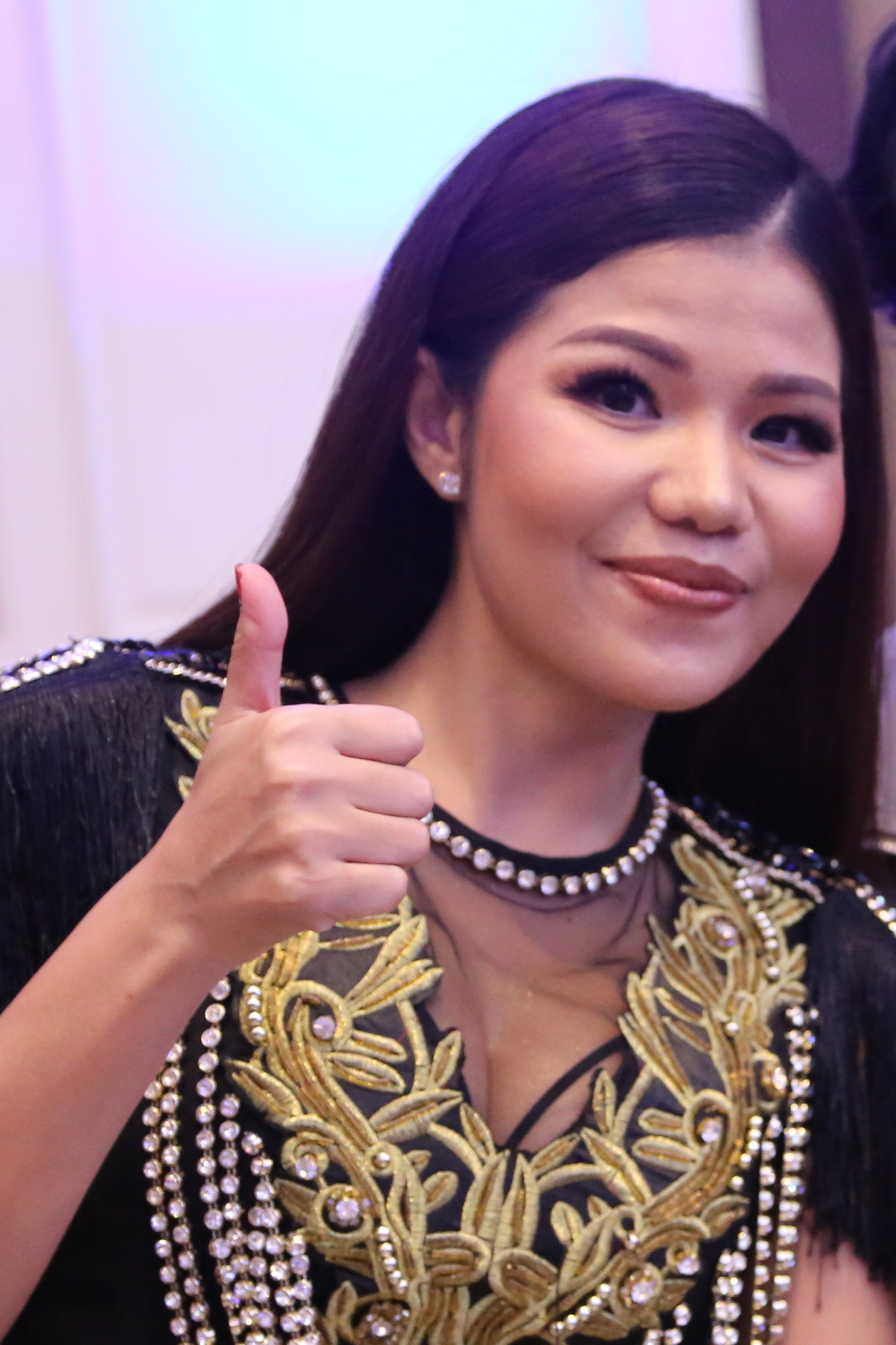
- Meas Soksophea in 2018

Background information
- Born: 29 January 1984 (age 42); Kampong Speu province
- Origin: Cambodia
- Genres: Khmer classical music, pop, R&B, rock & Latin music.
- Occupations: Singer, actress & brand ambassador
- Years active: 2004–present
- Label: Ream Production (2021–present)

Meas Sok Sophea (Khmer: មាស សុខសោភា); born January 29, 1984) is a Cambodian pop singer.

== Early life ==
Meas Sok Sophea was born on January 29, 1984, in Kampong Speu province to a father named Meas Sarim, a former director of the Kampong Speu Provincial Department of Industry, and a mother Sok Vilun, a former employee of the Department of Industry. Meas Sok Sophea has three siblings and she is the second child in the family. The eldest son in the family, Meas Sok Ratanak, is also a songwriter. He is the general manager of Town Production and the youngest son, Meas Sok Vannak, is a military officer. In 1990, Meas Sok Sophea's family decided to move from Kampong Speu province to live in Kandal province's Kien Svay district for a while. When her father suddenly died, the burden of providing for the family fell on his children. Meas Sok Sophea and her brother decided to sing at various weddings, usually paid with a small salary, until 2000 when Cambodia experienced the biggest flood in the country. The flood severely affected the Cambodian economy, with a loss of approximately $161 million and affected about 750,000 people. Due to the severe financial crisis, Sok Sophea decided to drop out of high school in the 10th grade, and moved for the second time, leaving Kandal province to Phnom Penh in 2002, and continued to sing in various restaurants and entertainment centers in Phnom Penh until she was offered to join Reaksmey Stung Sangke Productions in 2004.

== Music career ==
=== Popularity (2004–2009) ===
During 2005, Sok Sophea left Reaksmey Stung Sangke Production where she first appeared on, to join Chenla Brother Productions. She released a number of songs, many that became popular in Cambodia. Sok Sophea also often made appearances to perform on the country's music network, International Music Television. In 2008, Chenla-Brother Productions announced the closure of its production. Afterwards, Sok Sophea joined M-Production, which released her first album, "Excuse", which became a hit album. Her next song, "1000 Nights" (also released by M-Productions) was also a hit.

=== Sunday Productions (2009) ===
In 2009, Sok Sophea left M-Production to join Sunday Production. Another song "Come Dance New Year" also became a popular song for the rhythm Khmer traditional music that was very popular during that time. However, seeing that her popularity was waning, Sok Sophea left Sunday Production to join Town Production in 2010.

=== Meas Soksophea Music Japan Tour (2011) ===
In 2010, after leaving Sunday Productions, Sok Sophea joined Town Production and released her debut album "I am Sorry", which became an immediate hit. Her fans in Japan invited her to perform through the Cambodian Association of Japan.

== Work as a brand ambassador ==
During 2014, Huawei, a Chinese multinational technology corporation headquartered in Shenzhen, China, officially selected Meas Sok Sophea as its Goodwill Ambassador and Brand Ambassador of the smartphone company (Huawei Cambodia).

During 2015, Meas Sok Sophea and Kim Hyung-jun were named Goodwill Ambassadors of the Korean humanitarian organization W-Foundation and KOTRA Phnom Penh on June 30, 2015, through a Healthcare Improvement Project (HIP), which focuses on providing health care and education programs to Cambodian workers working in garment factories.

== Environmental protection advocacy ==
During 2014, Sok Sophea participated in a forest protection program with community members in the Aural area in Kampong Speu province and aided in arranging for tree reforestation. Sok Sophea greeted and shook hands with villagers and monks in the Oral Mountains, also known as Phnom Aural, in Trapeang Chor District Kampong Speu, where mass deforestation had devastated the ecosystem. Named the "10,000 Trees", the project began with the support of the Ministry of Environment of Cambodia and local communities.

=== Meas Soksophea Earth Hour (2016) ===
During 2016, Sok Sophea inspired young people to participate in the Earth Hour, a global movement organized by the World Wide Fund for Nature, which is held annually. The aim of the movement was to encourage individuals, communities and businesses to turn off non-essential electricity to help reduce global pollution and contribute to climate change mitigation. Earth Hour Day was held at the Royal University of Phnom Penh on March 19, 2016, under the auspices of Cellcard Cambodia.

== Awards ==
Year	Enter	Awards	Result	Media Publication
2008	Dohsa	Top1 Music Radio FM.97	Nominated	Apsara Radio FM.97
2008	Dohsa	Top 1 Music Cambodia TV9	Nominated	TV9 Cambodia
2013	Anachak Dara	The Female Singer Artist of The Year	Won	Sabay Company
2017	NRG Music Awards	Best Female Artist of The Year	Won	NRG 89FM Cambodia

== Discography ==
Album	Genres	Released	Label and Album
101 Promises (១០១ ហេតុផល)	Pop	2005	Chenla Brother CD Vol.06
Excuse (ដោះសារ)	Pop	2008	M CD Vol.01
1000 Nights (1000 រាត្រី)	Rock	2008	M CD Vol.05
Boom Dance (រាំលេងបទ Boom)	Latin	2009	Sunday CD Vol.101
Come Dance New Year (មករាំកន្ទ្រឹមឆ្នាំថ្មី)	Khmer Traditional	2009	Sunday CD Vol.104
