= Monirith Chhea =

Cambodian- American artist

Monirith Chhea (born 1960s) is a Cambodian- American visual artist from Phnom Penh. He is cited as one of the notable Cambodian-American artists who has worked with charcoal. The Art and Culture Program of Sido mentions Chhea as an example of Khmer art along with Narath Tan, Svay Pithoubandith and Emmanuel Nhean. In 2010 he appeared in the documentary Rain Falls from Earth: Surviving Cambodia's Darkest Hour, a grim account of those who fled Cambodia during the Khmer Rouge.

== Biography ==
Facing starvation and torture from the Khmer Rouge, by the age of ten he separated from his family in a labor camp and later in a refugee camp in Thailand. Eventually he came to live in California whilst his family immigrated to Canada. He began a career as an artist as a way to deal with his suffering. His paintings and drawings generally symbolize negative themes such as starvation, sickness, and death.

One of his early charcoal drawings, Childhood, completed in 1988, is of faceless Khmer Rouge soldier, represented as a demon-like figure. Another larger oil painting, Boys in the Field, completed in 1991, depicts starved young boys working as slaves, struggling to carry heavy bags of rice. The blue sky and the large palm trees in the background represent hope.

In 1993, he completed the small oil painting Re-Education, using images of skulls to represent those murdered at the Killing Fields; the bright colors such as red and orange around the skulls represents the blood which was shed during the massacres of the regime. However his work occasionally covers happier subject matter. In 1994, he showcased his work at Wenche Larson's Blue Moon Studio and Art Gallery in Skokie, Illinois.
