= You Khin =

- Born: March 2, 1947; Kampong Cham
- Died: August 8, 2009; Bangkok
- Education: Royal University of Fine Arts
- Movement: Impressionism
- Spouse: Muoy Svay

You Khin (Khmer: យូឃិន, 2 March 1947 – 9 August 2009) was a Cambodian architect and artist. He graduated from the Royal University of Fine Arts in 1973, and left Cambodia prior to the Khmer Rouge evacuation of Phnom Penh. Over the next two decades, he practised architecture in France, Sudan, Qatar and the United Kingdom. You Khin returned to Cambodia in 2003 with his wife Muoy where they founded a Montessori school for disadvantaged children and a guesthouse to help support it. His mixed media paintings are of the impressionist style and have been exhibited in the US, Sudan, the UK and Cambodia. The You Khin Memorial Women's Art Prize was established by the United States Embassy in Cambodia and JavaArts.

== Life ==
You Khin was born in Kampong Cham in 1947 to a farming family. He was inspired to paint by his uncle who painted murals in local pagodas. You Khin went on to study Interior Architecture in Phnom Penh, followed by a focus on 3D art in Marseilles.

== Themes ==
You Khin's work focuses on interactions among people, often faceless. The artist communicated sentiment related to the Khmer Rouge rule of Cambodia during his time in exile. Women feature prominently in the artist's later works.
