= Chhet Sovanpanha =

Cambodian singer (born 1986)

Chhet Sovanpanha ឈិត សុវណ្ណបញ្ញា
- Born: 6 September 1986 (age 40); Phnom Penh, People's Republic of Kampuchea (now Cambodia)
- Origin: Cambodia
- Genres: Cambodian music (pop, R&B, dance, soul, rock)
- Occupation: Singer
- Years active: 2005–present
- Labels: Rasmey Hang Meas Production (2005–2016); Town Production (2017–present)

Chhet Sovanpanha (Khmer: ឈិត សុវណ្ណបញ្ញា; born 6 September 1986) is a Cambodian singer.

== Discography ==
=== Main albums ===
- 2005: Mouse Loves Rice
- 2006: Romance of the Wind
- 2006: Love Tree
- 2007: Guitarist in Tears
- 2009: The Loneliness Heart
- 2011: Gomen Nasai

=== TOP Songs ===
- 2009: No Body

=== Featured albums ===
- 2006: Dance Revolution
- 2006: Kong Xi Fa Cai
- 2006: Family
- 2006: Water Festival 2006
- 2006: Merry Christmas
- 2007: Comedy Dance
- 2007: Cartoon Moodiness
- 2007: Kiss Me
- 2007: Millions of Hope
- 2007: Problematic
- 2007: Who Am I?
- 2007: Pretty Women
- 2007: Water Festival 2007
- 2008: Kontreum Dance
- 2008: Frozen
- 2008: 2008 New Year
- 2008: Beautiful Girl
- 2008: Sweet Memories
- 2008: Duet
- 2008: Scan Virus
- 2008: Water Festival 2008
- 2008: Exciting World III
- 2009: New Year 2009
- 2009: No. 1
- 2009: The Loneliness Heart
- 2009: Want Cha
- 2009: You're My Dream
- 2010: Most Wanted I
- 2010: Most Wanted II
- 2010: Water Festival 2010 Volume 1
- 2010: Water Festival 2010 Volume 2
- 2010: The Five
- 2011: Delusional Tears

=== Main DVDs ===
- 2006: Best of the Best 2006
- 2006: Xtreme Zone
- 2007: Best of the Best 2007
- 2008: Top Music Show 2008
- 2009: Best of the Best 2009
- 2010: Top Music Show 2009
- 2011: Top Music Show 2010
