= Meng Keo Pichenda =

Cambodian singer (born 1976)

- Born: 1976 (age 49–50) Democratic Kampuchea
- Origin: Takéo, Kingdom of Cambodia
- Genre: Pop/Traditional
- Years active: 1986–present
- Labels: Rasmey Hang Meas; SM-Mai Sammeth (2003-present); Chlangden; Angkor Wat Production (1990s)

Meng Keo Pichenda is a Cambodian singer and has been contracted to many companies for her services. She is the youngest of three sisters, two of them are vocal musicians.

She is well known for her unique and balanced sound-pitched voice and was particularly successful in the late 1990s, credited for a change in direction in Cambodian music. However, she prefers writing traditional Khmer songs rather than dance music.

She began traditional Khmer dancing when she was just a young girl, and when she turned 17 her music career began. Her style of music attracts the youth of Cambodia as well as adults. She is considered one of the most popular artists in Cambodia today.
