= Mao Sareth =

Cambodian singer (c. 1944–mid-1970s)

Mao Sareth ម៉ៅ សារ៉េត
- Mao Sareth, from a 1960s record cover

Background information
- Born: c. 1944; Battambang, Cambodia, French Indochina
- Died: c. 1976 Cambodia
- Genres: Traditional Khmer, romvong, saravan, film
- Occupation: Singer
- Years active: 1950s–1970
- Label: Wat Phnom Production

Pol Saran, (Note: Khmer: ប៉ុល សារ៉ាន់, romanized: Pŏl Sarăn; Khmer pronunciation: [pol saː.ran]) known as Mao Sareth, (Note: Khmer: ម៉ៅ សារ៉េត, romanized: Mau Saret; Khmer pronunciation: [maw saː.reːt]) was a Cambodian singer active from the early 1960s to the mid-1970s. She was one of the earliest popular singers in the Cambodian rock scene of the early 1960s, in which musicians combined traditional Khmer music styles with popular forms from the United States, Europe, and Latin America. Mao was cited as an influence by later singers Pen Ran and Ros Serey Sothea. She is known to have performed live as late as 1973.

Sareth was born in 1944 in Battambang Province, with the birth name Pol Saran. During an interview with Huoy Meas, Mao Sareth stated that she had three sisters and that she came from a family of musicians. In her free time she liked to read romantic novels. Along with many musicians and members of other suspect professions, she was murdered by the Khmer Rouge sometime during the later years of the Cambodian Civil War or early in the Cambodian Genocide.
