= Chanthou Oeur =

Cambodian painter and sculptor

Chanthou Oeuror Chakra Oeur also known as O'Bon, is a Cambodian painter and sculptor who has lived in the United States since the 1980s.
