= Chhom Nimol =

Cambodian-American singer

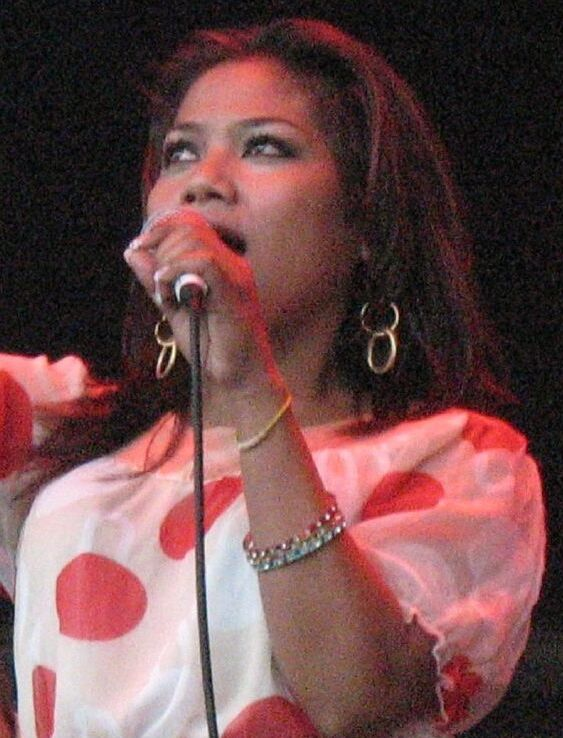
- Chhom Nimol performing with Dengue Fever at Beautiful Days Festival 2008

Background information
- Born: 1980 (age 45–46); Battambang, People's Republic of Kampuchea
- Genres: Cambodian rock, Rock, psychedelic, surf, indie
- Occupations: Singer, songwriter
- Instrument: Vocals
- Years active: 1997–present
- Label: Tuk Tuk Records
- Website: denguefevermusic.com

Chhom Nimol (Khmer: ឆោម និមល; [cʰaom niʔmɔəl]) is a Cambodian-American singer and lead vocalist for the band Dengue Fever, which she joined in 2001.

== Career ==
Chhom Nimol was born in Cambodia and for a time her family lived in a refugee camp in Thailand. She learned how to sing from her family, who are well-known musicians and singers in Cambodia. In 1997, she won Cambodia's Apsara Awards, a national singing competition. She emigrated to the United States in 2001.

Upon arriving in America, Nimol began singing in restaurants and bars in the Little Phnom Penh area of Long Beach, California. She was soon discovered at an audition by the American rock band Dengue Fever, who were interested in the Cambodian rock and pop music of the 1960s and 70s and sought a singer who could handle the Khmer lyrics of the original Cambodian songs they wished to perform. Dengue Fever released their first album in 2003 and have since expanded their repertoire into original songs inspired by Cambodian rock and many other world music styles. Nimol still usually sings in Khmer but now occasionally sings in English as well. She became a United States citizen in 2014.
