= Reyum Institute of Arts and Culture =

Cambodian cultural organization

Reyum Institute of Arts and Culture is an independent institute in Cambodia which is dedicated to the preservation of traditional and contemporary art and culture of Cambodia. The institute was founded in 1998 by Ly Daravuth and Ingrid Muan and is located next to the Royal University of Fine Arts and the National Museum of Cambodia.

Reyum is located in the Cambodian capital Phnom Penh, and includes a gallery, a cultural center and a commercial outlet. In the exposition hall, varying exhibitions are shown. Reyum collects art pieces and data from the Khmer Rouge .

The institute organizes exhibitions, lectures, dance performances, film evenings, publications, and many other events. It has for instance showed the traditional manufacturing of masks and taken care of the rehabilitation of the ornamental language Kbach. Furthermore, it has built up an archive of data on artists from earlier times, that have been only remembered by oral tradition.

In 2003, Reyum was honored with a Prince Claus Award from the Netherlands.
