= Huoy Meas =

Cambodian singer and radio announcer (1946–1977)

- Huoy Meas in c. 1963

Background information
- Origin: Cambodia
- Died: c. 1977
- Genre: Cambodian rock
- Occupations: Singer, radio personality
- Years active: 1960s – 1970s

Huoy Meas (Khmer: ហួយ មាស pronounced [huəj miəh]) (6 January 1946 – c. 1977) also known as Meas Mathrey, was a Cambodian singer and radio announcer in the 1960s and early 1970s.

== Biography ==
She was born in Svay Por Commune, Sangker District, Battambang Province, Cambodia. She also acted as a judge (with other singers such as Sinn Sisamouth, Liev Tuk, Touch Teng, Mao Sareth, and Chhoun Malai) in the formal public song contest Samach Cheat, which was established by Head of State Norodom Sihanouk.

Until the Khmer Rouge took control of Cambodia in April 1975, Meas was the most popular female radio DJ in Cambodia, working for the National Radio station and promoting the Cambodian rock and pop scene. During her work with the National Radio (RNK), she interviewed Cambodian artists like Mao Sareth, Sos Math, and others who played large roles in the music industry of Cambodia at that time. She was also a popular singer in that scene, noted for melancholy lyrics about her own personal life. Norodom Sihanouk compared her lyrics and singing style to those of Edith Piaf. Her most well-known songs included "Samros Borey Tioulong" and "Unique Child".

Meas disappeared during the Cambodian genocide of the late 1970s. One of the Khmer Rouge's first actions upon taking control of Cambodia was to commandeer the National Radio service where Meas worked. She is believed to have been one of the millions of residents of Phnom Penh ordered to evacuate the city and relocate to the countryside to become farm workers. Srey Channthys stated in interviews that Huoy Meas was raped by several Khmer Rouge soldiers and then killed, though her exact fate has never been confirmed. Her work as both a radio personality and recording artist was profiled in the 2015 documentary film Don't Think I've Forgotten.
