= Music of Cambodia =

The music of Cambodia is derived from a mesh of cultural traditions dating back to the ancient Khmer Empire, India, China and the original indigenous tribes living in the area before the arrival of Indian and Chinese travelers. With the rapid Westernization of popular music, Cambodian music has incorporated elements from music around the world through globalization.

== Folk and classical music ==
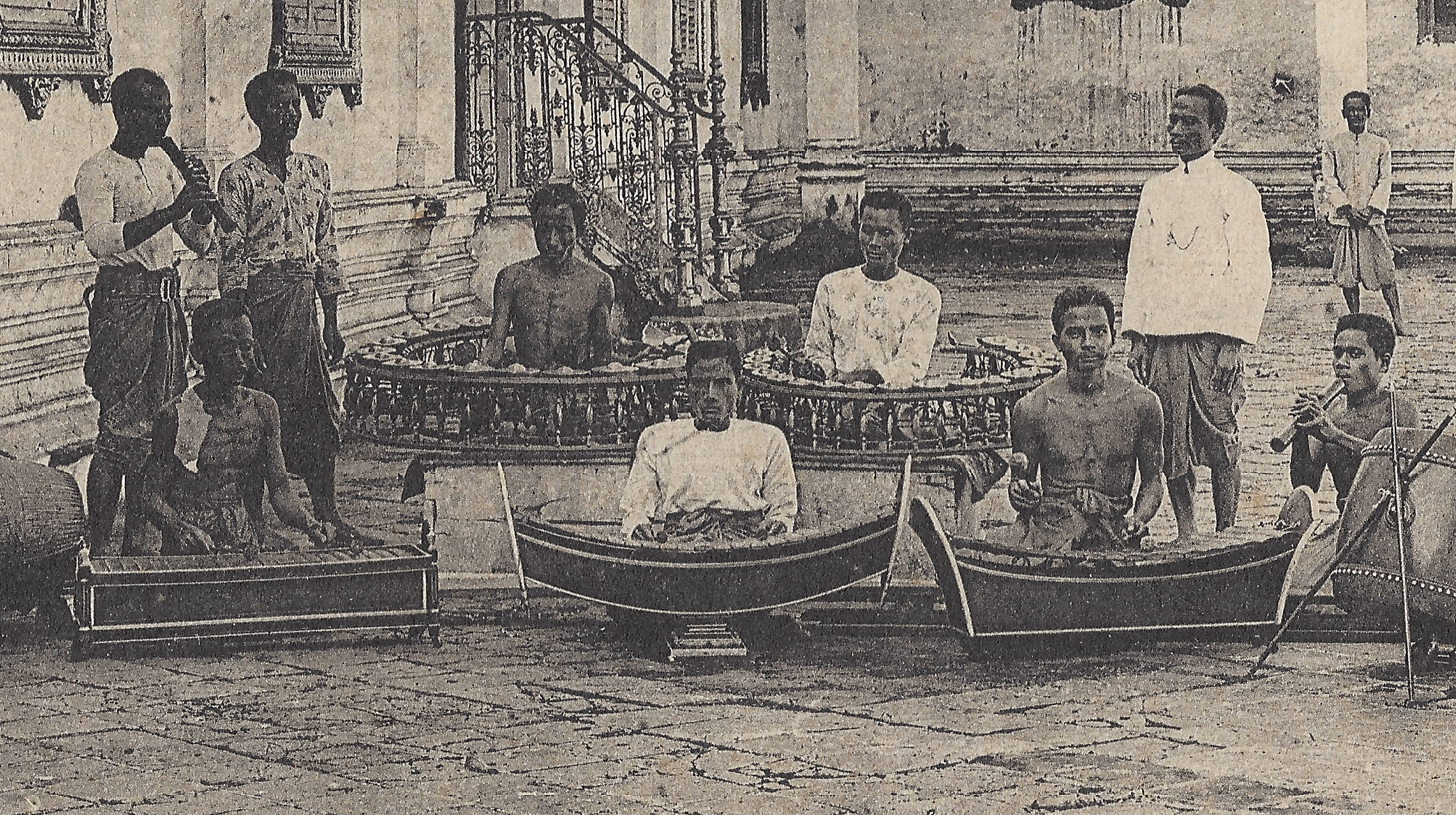
Cambodian orchestra for royal dances at the beginning of 20th century

Traditional Cambodian music that includes an instrument, phlom slek. Recorded outside Angkor Wat.

Cambodian art music is highly influenced by ancient forms as well as Hindu forms. Religious dancing, many of which depict stories and ancient myths, are common in Cambodian culture. Classical Khmer music usually is divided into three parts: pin peat, phleng kar, and mahori, all of which are associated with their religious dances. Some dances are accompanied by a pinpeat orchestra, which includes a ching (cymbal), roneat (bamboo xylophone), pai au (flute), sralai (oboe), chapey (bass moon lute or banjo), gong (bronze gong), tro (fiddle), and various kinds of drums. Each movement the dancer makes refers to a specific idea, including abstract concepts like today (pointing a finger upwards). The 1950s saw a revival in classical dance, led by Queen Sisowath Kossamak Nearyrath.

During the early 1970s, the Khmer Rouge of Cambodia committed genocide among the country's citizens. During their reign, an estimated "90% of Cambodia's musicians, dancers, teachers, and instrument makers" were killed, interrupting the transmission of cultural knowledge to following generations. The country has been undergoing revival ever since, with those remaining trying to perform, teach, research, and document what they can.

The traditional music has had to compete with foreign music that has different tonal systems of scales and pitch frequency. Lack of a formal written-system of music theory for Cambodian music lent to a perception among modern Cambodians that the music was "incorrect", "out of tune" or "uncouth" when compared to western music or to Chinese music. Traditional music still exists today, but its survival is the result of formal government efforts (both the UNESCO and Cambodian) as well as academics. These have worked to organize knowledge of the Cambodian music system and its distinct traditions.

Sam-Ang Sam, a Cambodian ethnomusicologist, wrote a brief introduction to Cambodian music on his website, part of his work to preserve knowledge Cambodian music and educating. He spoke of music in three different areas of Cambodia: villages, the court and temples. In each setting, music had a formal function or was entertainment. Village music included kar boran music for weddings, araak music for communication with spirits, and "ayai repartee singing, chrieng chapey narrative, and yike and basakk theaters." Court music had orchestras composed of a specific set of instruments. The pinpeat orchestra (consisting of gong chimes, xylophones, a metallophone, oboe and drums) accompanied the formal dance, masked play, shadow play and religious ceremonies. Less formal entertainment was played by a mohori orchestra. Temples had a "korng skor" ensemble (gongs and drums), as well as a pinpeat orchestra.

Additionally, Sam-Ang Sam differentiates between music made by the mainstream Cambodians (Cambodian music) and the distinct music of ethnic minorities (part of the music of Cambodia). The latter includes music made by people living in Rattanakiri and Mundulkiri and provinces, the Koulen and Cardamom ranges, and the vicinity "around the great lake (Tonle Sap)." Differences of language and religion help to create the separation between the different cultures. Ethnic groups include upload Mon-Khmer language groups (Pnorng, Kuoy (Kui), Por, Samre) whose music consists of "gong ensembles, drum ensembles, and free-reed mouth organs with gourd windchests." Other ethnic groups include Cham, Chinese, Vietnamese who all potentially could have music from their home cultures, but which is "unknown."

=== Pinpeat ===
The roneat has been described as a bamboo xylophone.

One of the traditional music forms is Pinpeat (Khmer: ពិណពាទ្យ), in which an orchestra or musical ensemble performs the ceremonial music of the royal courts and temples of Cambodia. The royal orchestra would accompany the classical ballets, both male (Lokhon Khol) and female (Apsara), as well as the Grand Theater of Shadows, the Sbek Thom. The orchestra consists of approximately nine or ten instruments, mainly wind and percussion (including several varieties of xylophone and drums). It accompanies court dances, masked plays, shadow plays, and religious ceremonies. The pinpeat is analogous to the piphat ensemble of Thailand.

In recent years the instrument that gave the pinpeat its name, the pin, has been revived. The instrument was lost or abandoned around the 13 century A.D.

=== Mahori ===
Another form of traditional music was mahori music, which was the entertainment music of the courts of Cambodia, Siam and Laos. While the pinpeat music was religious and "for deities", the mohori music was made for noblemen, focusing on themes and moods to "delight their souls." This music "favors soft instruments", including khloy flute, krapeu, tro chhé, tro sor and Tro Ou stringed instruments, and roneat ek xylophone, roneat thong metallophone, skor romonea drums and chhing finger cymbals. It's important to note that the term mahori has connection with Thai music, and instrumentation is closely related, but the songs are not.

=== Arak ===
Arak (araak, areak, aareak) music was music for religious and healing purposes, dating to "animist spiritual beliefs" of ancient Cambodia. Traditionally it was used to "drive out illness," and used flute, drum, tro, chapei and kse diev.

== Cambodian rock and pop ==
Starting in the late 1950s, Head of State Norodom Sihanouk, a musician himself, encouraged the development of popular music in Cambodia. Initially, pop records from France and Latin America were imported into the country and became popular, inspiring a flourishing music scene based in Phnom Penh and led by singers like Ros Serey Sothea, Pen Ran or Sinn Sisamouth, with hits such as "Violon Sneha".

By the late 1960s and early 1970s, the scene was further influenced by Western rock and roll and soul music via U.S. armed forces radio that had been broadcast into nearby South Vietnam. This resulted in a unique sound in which Western pop and rock were combined with Khmer vocal techniques.

Many of the most important singers of this era perished during the Khmer Rouge genocide. Western interest in the popular Cambodian music of the 1960s-70s was sparked by the bootleg album Cambodian Rocks in 1996, which in turn inspired the 2015 documentary film Don't Think I've Forgotten.

In early 2020, playwright Lauren Yee's Cambodian Rock Band premiered at the Signature Theatre in NYC. It told the story of a Cambodian band coming under the regime of Pol Pot and incorporated actual music from Cambodian rock bands of the 1970s.

== Modern music ==
Classic Cambodian pop music, or modern music, includes slow, crooner-type music exemplified by songs such as Sinn Sisamouth's "Ae Na Tov Thansuo?" (ឯណាទៅឋានសួគ៌?), as well as dance music. Dance music is classified according to the type of dance signified by the rhythm. The two most common types of Cambodian dance music are romvong and rom kbach. Romvong is slow dance music, while ramkbach is closely related to Thai folk music. Recently, a form of music called kantrum has become popular. Originating among the Khmer Surin in Thailand, kantrum is performed by both Thai and Cambodian stars.

Modern Cambodian music is usually presented in Cambodian karaoke VCDs, which typically feature actors and actresses mimicking song lyrics. Noy Vanneth and Lour Sarith are two examples of modern singers who sing songs on the karaoke VCDs, and the VCDs feature songs composed by other musicians, in addition to songs sung and composed by notable musician Sinn Sisamouth.

=== Production House Music ===
During and after the Khmer Rouges and the People's Republic of Kampuchea, most of the music emerged from the refugee camps such as Khao-I-Dang on the Thai border, with artists such as Keo Sarath or Barnabas Mam. The majority of post-Khmer Rouge Cambodian music is produced by a handful of production companies which include; Rasmey Hang Meas, Sunday Productions and Town Production. These companies function as the record labels within the Cambodian music business. Notable artists signed under these companies include Preap Sovath, Aok Sokunkanha, Sokun Nisa, Khemarak Sereymun and Meas Soksophea.

=== Original Music Movement ===
The Cambodian Original Music Movement refers to a group of young Khmer musicians in Cambodia who write, record and perform original compositions. It began largely as a result of the creation of a venue in Phnom Penh called Show Box, a cross-cultural community hub created exclusively to promote original Khmer alternative art and music, and an amalgamation of various unique contemporary artists and musicians who were encouraged by music and art platforms like Cambodia's first alternative label Yab Moung Records. Yab Moung Records and Show Box actively encouraged the production of original music and was the artistic home of many original alternative musicians. Show Box only hosted original performances from both Khmer and international musicians and acted as a community hub for innovative ideas.

This movement is described by some as their response to a copycat music culture, where many modern Khmer-language songs copy the melodies and lyrical themes from nearly identical Chinese, Thai, Korean, American and Vietnam works. Artists who are known in this movement include Adda Angel, Sai, Bonny B., Khmeng Khmer, Laura Mam, P-Sand, Nikki Nikki, Van Chesda, Sliten6ix, Sam Rocker, Kanhchna Chet, Sophia Kao and Smallworld Smallband. The genres of these musicians includes blues music, pop music, rap music, rock music and electronic music.

The #IAmOriginal project was formed in order to promote up and coming original artists. IAmOriginal identifies itself as a "non-profit music foundation aimed at promoting creative and innovative music in Cambodia by providing training, legal consultation, financial and marketing support to artists who are passionate about music." They have released two albums and held concerts for each of the album launches. Many of Cambodia's young celebrities participate in this movement though showing support at events and through social media.

A new project by Laura Baker, The Sound Initiative, also seeks to train and mentor new artists.

In 2016, Laura Mam founded Baramey Production, a pioneering music label, nurturing the talents of original music stars in Cambodia. Today, Baramey is on the mainstream with the success of Vannda's several hits songs most notably Time To Rise. In 2021, Baramey signed a deal with the Asian branch of Warner Music's ADA; the first major international agreement for a Cambodian music label.

The choreography of "You Da One", a contemporary Cambodian pop song sung by Norodom Jenna.

Norodom Jenna, a member of the House of Norodom, Cambodia's ruling family, has denied rumors of entering into the Korean pop industry.

=== Khmer Alternative Music ===
In recent years there has been a resurgence of creativity in contemporary Khmer art forms and music is no exception. Cambodia's first alternative music label Yab Moung Records was founded in 2012 and has since recorded and released the first Khmer Hardcore and Death Metal tracks as well as producing a wide range of alternative artists creating unique Khmer blues, rock, hip hop and alternative music.

Yab Moung Records provides an ongoing platform for Khmer alternative music and art and actively encourages creative expression within a uniquely Cambodian context.

== Khmer Boxing Music ==
Sample of Traditional Khmer music played before Khmer boxing match.

The music of Khmer boxing is called vung phleng pradall or vung phleng klang khek. The music uses an oboe, drums(sampho) and cymbals(chhing). The music comes in two parts. The first part uses a spirit(teacher) to help the boxers concentrate their minds and have confidence. The first part of the music is played slowly in a rubato style. The melody is played by the oboe and the sampho plays strokes at important points of the melody. The second part which is the fight music is played much faster and in meter. The music accelerates with the progression of the round. It stops at the end of the round or when someone is knocked out. When the fight is exciting, the audience claps in rhythm with the beat of the sampho.

== Awards ==
Notable music awards include the Anachak Dara Awards, established in 2012; the Cambodian Music Awards (formerly the NRG Music Awards), established in 2017; and the Pleng Music Awards, launched in 2022.

== See also ==
- Traditional Cambodian musical instruments
- Chrieng Brunh
- Nuon Kan
