= 18th-century classical music =

18th-century classical music may refer to:

- Baroque period music from c. 1600 to 1750
- Classical period music from c. 1750 to 1820

== See also ==
- Classical music (disambiguation)
- Art music
