= Classical music (disambiguation) =

Classical music generally refers to the art music of the Western world, considered to be distinct from Western folk music or popular music traditions

Classical music may also refer to:

- Classical period (music), the era from mid-18c to early 19c, exemplified in the First Viennese School
- Classical Music (magazine) (launched in 1976 as Classical Music Weekly)
- Classical music blog, any blog devoted to the subject
- For other traditions see list of classical and art music traditions

== By geography ==
=== Western traditions ===
- Australian classical music
- Italian classical music
- Russian classical music
- Classical music in Kosovo
- Classical music of the United Kingdom
  - Classical music in Scotland
  - Classical music of Birmingham
- Classical music of the United States

=== Non-Western traditions ===
- Gagaku (Japan)
- Yayue (China)
- Gamelan (Java and Bali, Indonesia)
- Khmer Pinpeat, Thai Piphat, Lao Pinphat
- Indian classical music
  - Hindustani classical music of north India
  - Carnatic music of south India
- Persian traditional music
- Ottoman music
- Andalusian classical music
- Byzantine music

== See also ==
- Art music
- List of classical music concerts with an unruly audience response
