= Chamrieng Samai =

Genre of pop music from Cambodia

See related articles romvong, ramkbach, kantrum, pinpeat orchestra, and music of Cambodia.

Jamrieng Samai (ចម្រៀងសម័យ) is a genre of pop music from Cambodia. The slower dance music, ramvong and ramkbach are the two separate types of Jamrieng samai.

== See also ==
- Khmer classical dance
- Dance of Cambodia
- Culture of Cambodia
