= Khloy =

Musical instrument

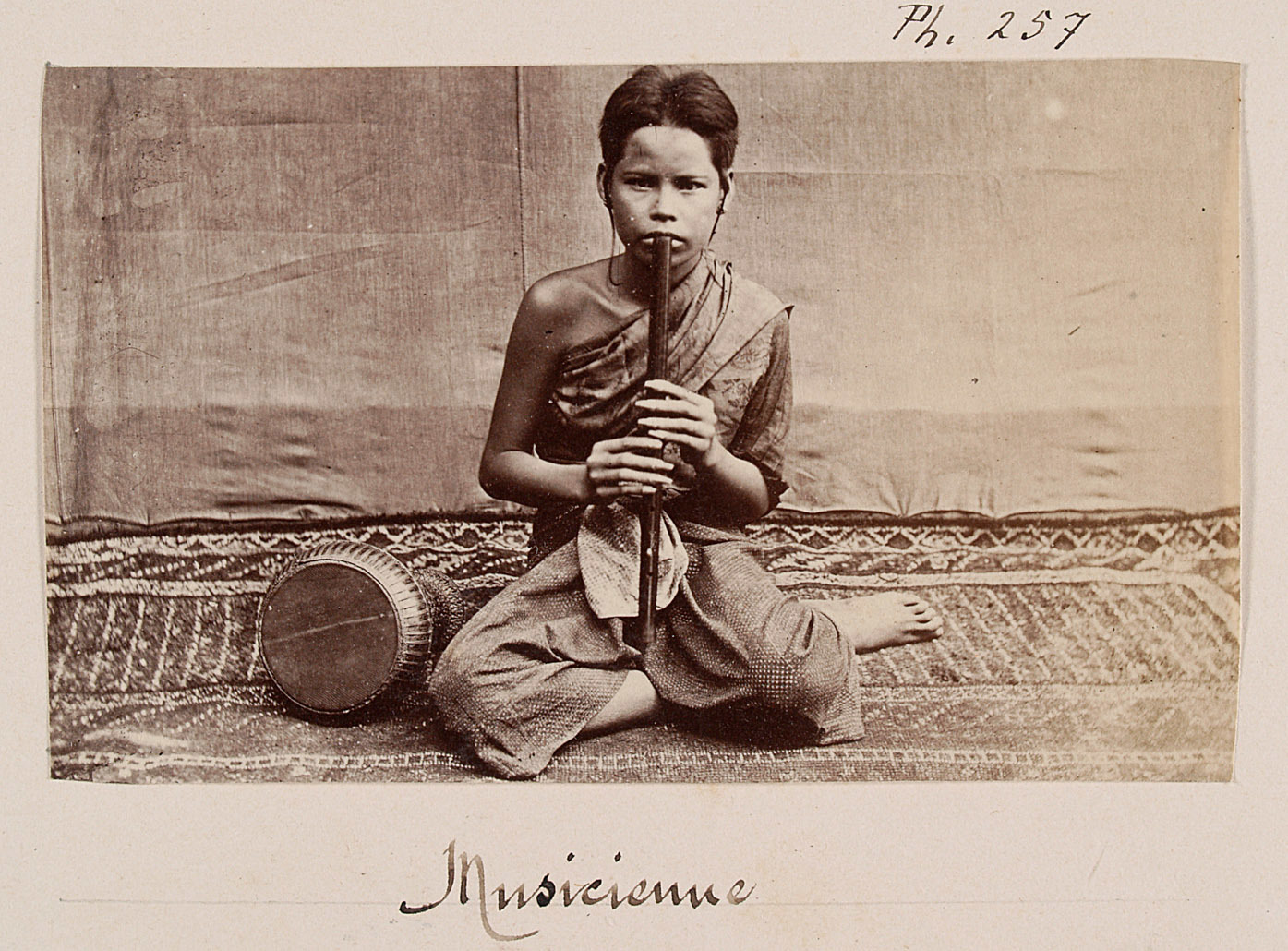
Khmer female musician playing khloy taken by Emile Gsell, mid 1800s. Cambodia

The khloy (Khmer: ខ្លុយ, Burmese: ပုလွေ, Khmer pronunciation: [kʰloj]) is a traditional bamboo vertical duct flute from Cambodia and more specifically the Khmer people. The khloy and other similar bamboo flutes can be found throughout Asia, due to bamboo's abundance in the region. The khloy is a duct flute and has two sizes: smaller, higher-pitched (khloy ek) and larger, lower-pitched (khloy thomm). It has six finger holes and a thumb hole, or seven finger holes and no thumb hole. A hole above the highest finger hole may be covered with a membrane made of rice paper or bamboo inner skin, similar to di mo.

The Cambodian khloy is often mistaken for its close relative of Thailand, the klui flute, however Khmer khloy is aged older. Unlike the klui flute, the khloy is generally played solo in an informal setting. The khloy is mostly played using the pentatonic scale.

== Etymology ==
Khloy or khluy is a Khmer word for flute. The word kluy appears on a pedestal at Kuk Prasat temple dated to 994 AD. The term kluy later transmitted into modern Khmer word khluy or khloy. Whereas, the term venu (Sanskrit: flute) was inscribed on a 9th-century foundation stele at Preah Ko temple.

== History ==
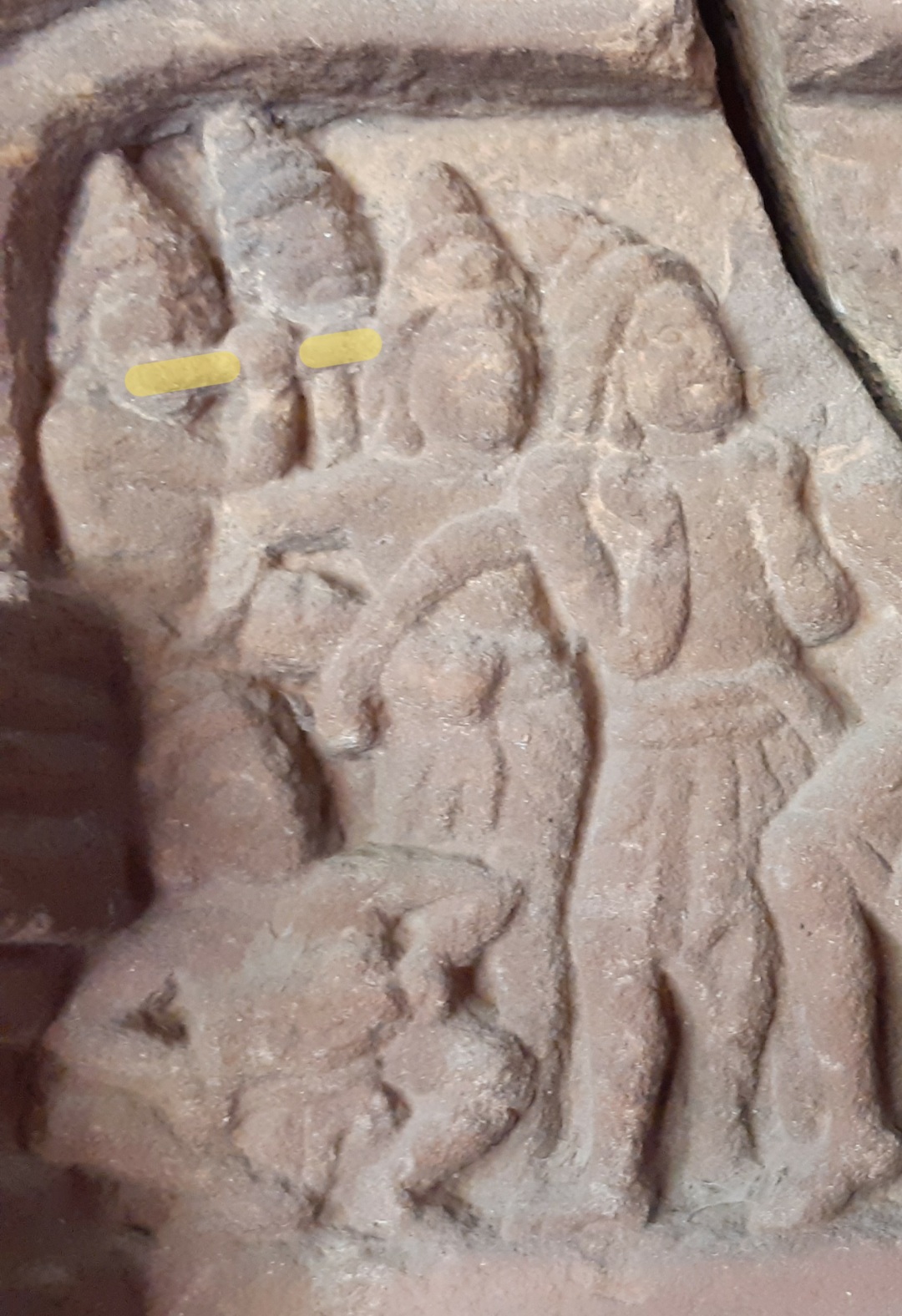
Yellow: Khmer depiction of flute (khloy) as seen on a 7th-century lintel from Sambor Prey Kuk. Now exhibits at National Museum of Cambodia.

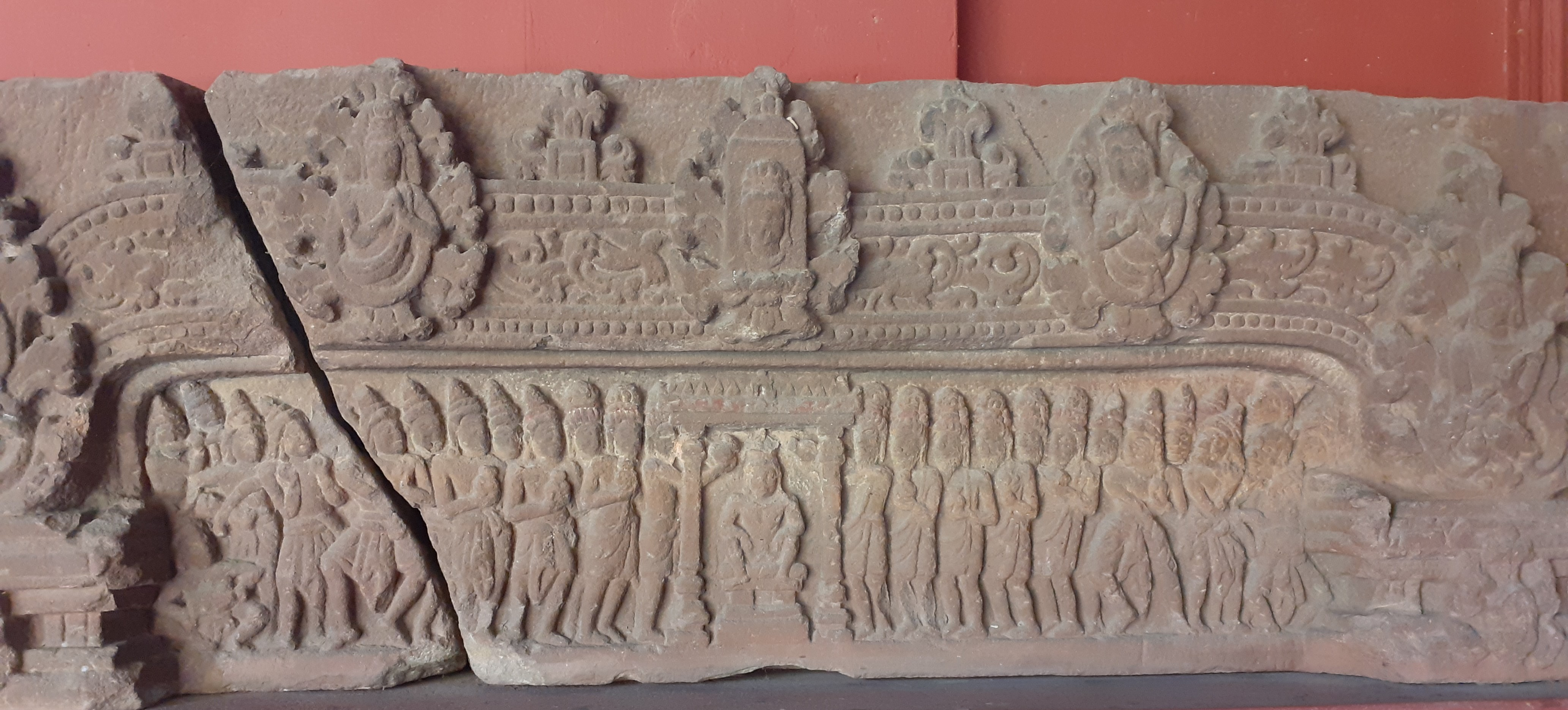
7th century lintel from Sambor Prey Kuk depicted two flute players ( right end and 4th figure at the right). Phnom Penh National Museum.

The earliest depiction of flute in Cambodia were seen on two lintels from Sambor Prey Kuk temple, dated to 7th century. This musical instrument was also carved on a bas relief of Phnom Bakheng from late 9th to 10th century.

== See also ==
- Music of Cambodia
- Bamboo musical instruments
