= List of classical and art music traditions =

"Classical music" and "art music" are terms that have been used to refer to music of different cultural origins and traditions. Such traditions often date to a period regarded as the "golden age" of music for a particular culture.

The following tables list music styles from throughout the world and the period in history when that tradition was developed:

== Southeast Asian ==
Style	Earliest historical period	Notes
Gamelan	At least 8th century AD.	
Pinpeat	At least 6th century AD.	
Mahori	At least 14th century AD.	
Piphat		
Pinphat		
Hsaing waing		

== Indic ==
Style	Earliest historical period	Notes
Carnatic music	At least 6th century AD (as Indian classical music), split from Hindustani classical music in the 16th and 17th centuries.	
Hindustani classical music	At least 6th century AD (as Indian classical music), split from Carnatic music in the 16th and 17th centuries.	
Klasik	At least 6th century AD (as Indian and Hindustani classical music), split from Hindustani classical music c. 1860.	The classical tradition of Afghanistan, ultimately a descendant of Hindustani classical music. Developed in the 19th century by Indian musicians in Afghan courts. Along with Hindustani music theory and instruments, Afghan classical music also uses local Pashtun elements, especially in its performance practices.
Odissi music	At least 6th century AD.	

== East Asian ==
Style	Earliest historical period	Notes
Nanguan music	At least 14th century CE.	
Gagaku	6th century CE.	
Jeongak	5th century CE.	
Nhã nhạc	13th century CE.	
Yayue	At least 2nd century BCE.	

== European ==
Style	Earliest historical period	Notes
Byzantine music	4th century AD.	
Pibroch	At least the 17th century AD.	
Western classical music	6th century AD.	

== North African & Middle Eastern ==
Style	Earliest historical period	Notes
Persian classical music	At least 3rd century AD, with drastic changes in the 16th and 19th centuries.	
Arabic classical music		
Maghreb-Andalusi classical music]]	9th century AD.	Evolved since the early 9th century, the musical tradition of Al-Andalus is notable for spreading Middle Eastern and North African musical instruments to Western Europe, where they would become staple instruments of Western tradition. Now practiced in Maghreb in the form of the Andalusi nubah, this tradition has also had considerable effect on Ottoman classical music, especially in the Sephardic romance and Maftirim repertoire.
Ottoman classical music	At least 3rd century AD (as Persian traditional music), emerged as a unique tradition in the 17th century.	Now known as Turkish Art Music or Turkish Classical Music
Shashmaqam		

== Sub-Saharan African ==
Style	Earliest historical period	Notes
Griot		The tradition of the djeli

== Syncretic ==
Style	Earliest historical period	Notes
American gamelan	c. 1960	
Mahāgīta	16th or 17th century AD.	The classical tradition of Burma seems to have begun around the late Toungoo period, with an expansion of Western-influenced repertoire during the colonial period. Organized into various forms based on tuning systems, melodic structure, rhythmic patterns and performance conventions, commonly played genres include the kyo, bwe, and thachingan.

== See also ==
- List of opera genres
