= Rom kbach =

Rom kbach (Khmer: រាំក្បាច់) is a genre of Cambodian popular music and a popular Khmer dance style. Rom kbach has a slower emotional melody similar to Thai music, whereas the Chamrieng Samai music category of romvong has a faster tune. The two main cultural dance styles of Cambodia are the romvong and rom kbach, however the lam leav and saravan dance styles are also popular. They have their roots in ancient cultural traditions.

== See also ==
- Khmer classical dance
- Dance of Cambodia
- Culture of Cambodia
- Music of Cambodia
