= Laura Mam =

Cambodian musician

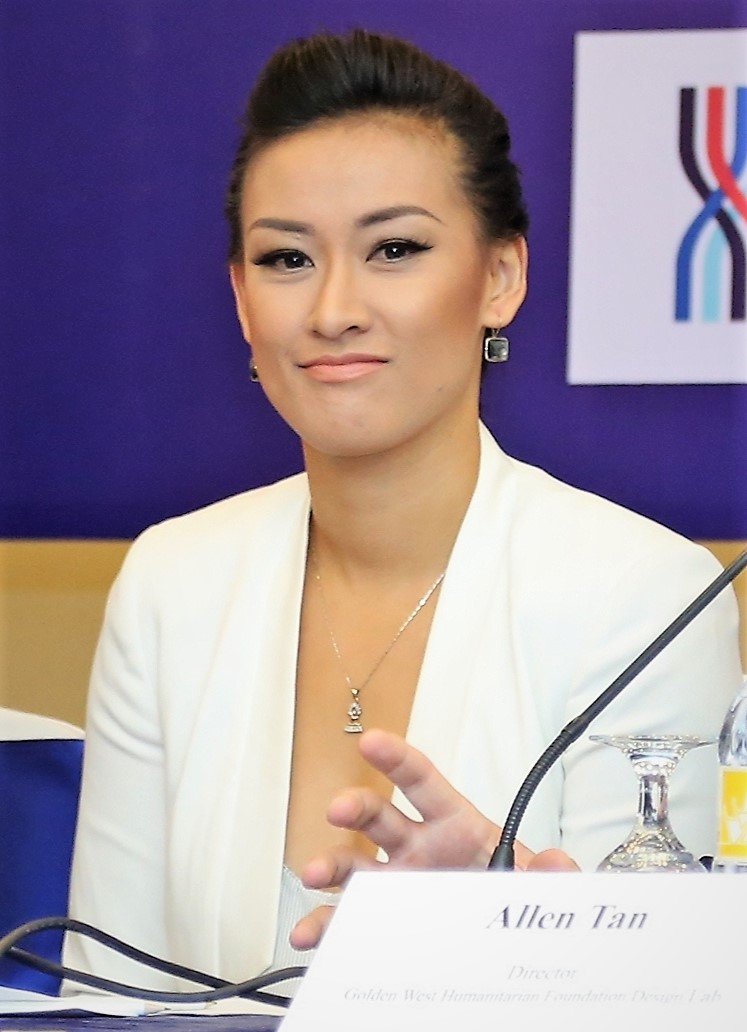
- Mam at the US Embassy in Cambodia in 2016

Background information
- Born: Laura Tevary Mam; 31 October 1986 (age 40); San Jose, California, U.S.
- Genres: Pop Music, New Wave Cambodian Original Music
- Occupations: Singer, songwriter, producer, businesswoman
- Years active: 2008–present
- Label: Baramey Productions

Laura Tevary Mam (Khmer: ឡូរ៉ា ទេវរី ម៉ម (Lōrā Tēvarī Mām); born 31 October 1986) is an American artist, songwriter, music producer, and businesswoman. She is known for being a member of the Cambodian Original Music Movement and is the founder and CEO of Baramey Productions.

== Early life ==
Laura Tevary Mam was born in San Jose, California to a Cambodian immigrant and Buddhist family. Her mother Thida Buth was a software developer in Silicon Valley, born and raised in Phnom Penh, Cambodia. She left her career to become an author and published her first book, បាត់ស្រមោល, in 2020. Buth also helped produce, starred in, and edited 5 books and 4 documentary films about the Cambodian Genocide. Her grandmother believed that Mam was the reincarnation of her husband, Buth Cheon, who was killed by the Khmer Rouge because of his position as a politician. Laura Mam's father Vitou Mam is a Lead Mechanic at United Airlines, born and raised in Phnom Penh, Cambodia.

Both of Mam's parents are Khmer Rouge Genocide survivors. They fled war-torn Cambodia to Thailand when Vietnam invaded Cambodia in January 1979. They were accepted as political refugees in the United States of America in March 1980. The two met while they were living under the Khmer Rouge Rule and were arranged to be married by their respective family.

Mam has a young brother, Andrew Tevuth Mam, and a younger half-sister, Tiffany Mam, on her father's side.

== Early life and education ==
Mam grew up in San Jose, California among a community of Asian Americans. Her parents wanted her and her brother to feel fully American, and so raised them speaking English. However, Laura's mother sang her Khmer lullabies, and gave her Cambodian dancing lessons, so she would have an appreciation of the culture of Cambodia. Mam's mother introduced her to the Cambodian community where they also taught her Khmer and Cambodian performing arts. While attending the University of California at Berkeley, she took courses in Khmer language and culture. Mam graduated in 2008 with a Bachelor of Arts with a major in Anthropology.

== Career ==
Before becoming a singer, Mam was completing a degree in anthropology with a social-cultural focus on Cambodia, and working at Global Heritage Fund on the preservation of a Cambodian heritage site. Mam stumbled into the entertainment world after one of her original Khmer-language songs, ផ្កាព្រហាមរីកពព្រាយ(Phka Prôham Rīk Pôprây) went viral on YouTube. The video had reached 75,000 views in the course of a single night. Mam is well known for her incorporation of Khmer traditional music into modern sounds as seen in songs such as “Fate”, and “Just Like You”, and “Buong Suong”.

In 2016, Laura and her mother founded Baramey Production, their own production company dedicated to boosting original talent. The first group they signed was Kmeng Khmer, which means Khmer youth.nd Culture prize from the Women of the Future Awards South East Asia.

== Baramey Production ==
In 2016, Laura and her mother created Baramey, their own production company dedicated to supporting upcoming artists and boosting original talent. Baramey's artists produce music in a variety of genres, including hip-hop, rock, psychedelic, and traditional Khmer. The first act to be signed was hip-hop duo Kmeng Khmer. Baramey now represents 15 artists, who have produced 20 albums, including VannDa, Sophia Kao, Vanthan, Lux, Polarix, and La Cima Cartel.

Kmeng Khmer, was discovered by Laura Mam in 2014 while they were, at the time, solo artists, working on a joint project with the group Smallworld, Smallband. Kmeng Khmer gained greater recognition with their song "Bonn Phum" (a collaboration with Smallworld Smallband), and their debut album “My Way” was released eight months after signing with Baramey Production. In 2018, Kmeng Khmer released “My Way 2” including the singles “Far Away” and “Na Na Ke”.

In 2021, VannDa and Baramey Production gained further success domestically and internationally with the release of “Time to Rise” featuring Master Kong Nay. The song won Lifted Asia's Song of the Year, and Music Video of the Year. It was placed in Apple Music's Editorial Teams' Top 100 songs of the year. The “Time to Rise” Music video now has garnered over 98 million views on Youtube.

In 2021, Baramey became the first Cambodian label to sign with ADA, the Asian division of Warner Music's label.

== Advocacy ==
Mam is an advocate for Intellectual Property (IP) rights and IP law enforcement. When Mam first moved to Cambodia, she was faced with the norms of music piracy. Thus, inspiring her continuous fight for the original music movement in Cambodia. Mam believes that with the emergence of technology in Cambodia and how much content is created in the digital sphere, the rights and enforcement of IP should also revolve around technology in order to protect artists' content, the entertainment industry, and other sectors.

In 2018, Laura Mam hosted a TED Talk called 'How music revolution changes Cambodia narrative'. Mam discussed how her music has explored various forms of Cambodian traditional music.

== Awards and nominations ==
Mam was awarded the 2018 Arts and Culture prize from the Women of the Future Awards South East Asia.

== Discography ==
| Title | Type | Released | Label |
| Just Like You | Single | 2021 | Baramey Production |
| Tomorrow Forever | Vanthan's Single | 2021 | Baramey Production-Vanthan Ft. VannD, Laura Mam |
| Be With You | VannDa's Single | 2020 | Baramey Production-VannDa ft. Laura Mam, Polarix |
| Follow Ma Dance | Polarix's Single | 2020 | Baramey Production-Polarix ft. Laura Mam, Kmeng Khmer, VannDa |
| បារមីទូកង-Baramey Tuk Ngo | Baramey Crew | 2019 | Baramey Production-Laura Mam, Kmeng Khmer, Oun, VannDa, Songha, Polarix |
| ព្រហ្មលិខិត- Fate | Single | 2019 | Baramey Production-Ft. VannDa, Medha |
| Coming Home | Single | 2019 | Baramey Production-Ft. Oun |
| ស្រីស្អាត-Srey Saart | Single | 2019 | Baramey Procution-Ft. Sok Pisey |
| សម្លឹងរកស្នេហ៍-Looking for Love | Single | 2018 | Baramey Production-Ft. Oun |
| រាំមិនឆ្អែតទេ-Rom Min Chaet Te | Single | 2018 | Baramey Production-Ft. Kmeng Khmer, Oun, DJ Rxthy |
| We've Only Just Begun | Awaken Album | 2017 | Baramey Production |
| ព្យាបាលបេះដូង-Heal the Heart | Awaken Album | 2017 | Baramey Production |
| Not Loyal | Awaken Album | 2017 | Baramey Production |
| Since You've Been Gone | Awaken Album | 2017 | Baramey Production |
| Tear Me Down | Awaken Album | 2017 | Baramey Production |
| ស្មារតីកីឡា-The Spirit of Sports | Collaboration with Various Artists | 2016 | Smart Axiata |
| For My People | Single | 2016 | Baramey Production |
| We Could Fall in Love? | Single | 2016 | Baramey Production |
| ណាវណ្ណី គូខ្ញុំ-Navanny Ku Kyom | Cover of Yus Olarang's Song | 2015 | Baramey Production-Ft. Kmeng Khmer |
| ម៉ាឌីហ្សូនថ្មី-Madizone Tmey | Single | 2015 | Baramey Production |
| ចិញ្ចៀនបញ្ចាំចិត្ត-Chenchean Boncham Chet | Single | 2015 | Independent |
| យល់សប្តិយល់សូង-Yosop Yulsong | Single | 2015 | Baramey Production |
| ខ្ញុំមិនសុខចិត្តទេ-Kyom Min Sok Chet Te | Cover-In Search Of Heroes Album | 2014 | Independent |
| មន្តទឹកភ្លៀង-Mun Tuk Pleang (Meet Me in the Rain) | Meet me in the Rain EP | 2014 | Independent |
| សុបិន្តស្នេហ៍-Soben Sneh | Meet Me in the Rain EP | 2013 | Independent |
| Devotion | Single | 2013 | Independent |
| You Belong to Me | Cover Ft. Luke Borello | 2013 | Independent |
| តន្ត្រីស្នេហ៍-Dontrey Sni (Music Love) | Single | 2012 | The Like Me's |
| ស្វារាំម៉ុនឃីស-Sva Rom Monkiss | Cover | 2010 | Independent |
| ផ្កាព្រហាមរីកពព្រាយ-Pka Proheam Rik Popreay | Single | 2010 | Independent |
| Cambodian Simplicity | Single | 2009 | Independent |
| Chenda and Steen Wedding Song | Single | 2009 | Independent |
| Love Song for Proposition 8 | Single | 2008 | Independent |
| A Song for My Fingers | Single | 2008 | Independent |
