= Ching (instrument) =

Cambodian and Thai finger cymbals

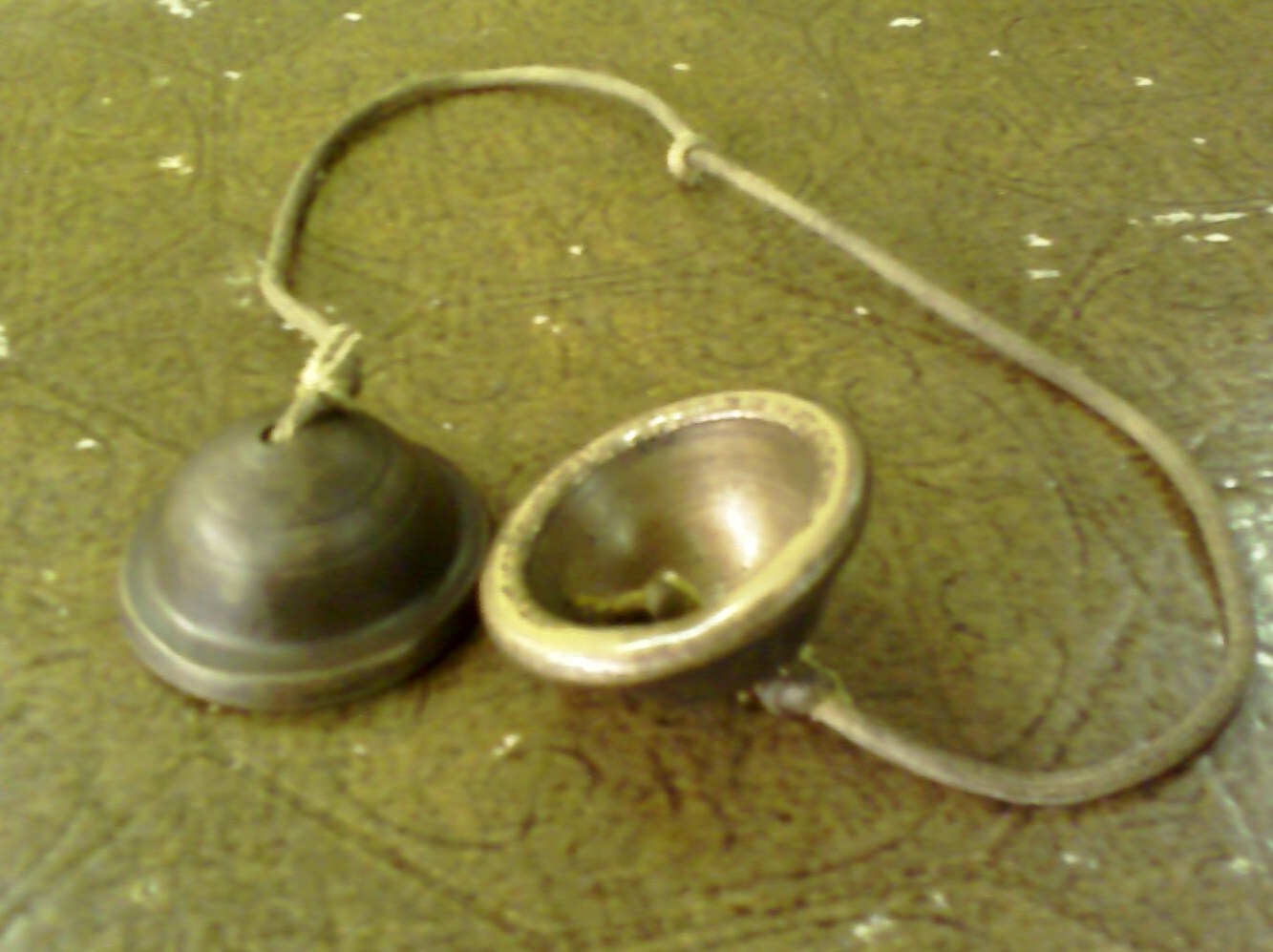
- A pair of ching

Percussion instrument
- Other names: Chheng, Chhing
- Hornbostel–Sachs classification: 111.142 (idiophone)

Ching (also spelled Chheng, Khmer: ឈិង or Chhing, Thai: ฉิ่ง) are finger cymbals played in Cambodian and Thai theater and dance ensembles.

== Construction and use ==
Joined by a cord that runs through the center, ching are bowl-shaped, about 5 centimeters in diameter, and made of bronze alloy—iron, copper, and gold. They are struck together in a cyclical pattern to keep time and regulate the melody, and they function as the "timekeeper" of the ensemble. The rhythm typically consists of alternating the accented closed stroke with an unaccented open "ching" stroke. The name "ching" is probably onomatopoeic for this open sound.

== Musical context ==
The Cambodian ensemble—which has traditionally accompanied court dance, masked plays, and shadow plays and ceremonies—is composed of vocalists and instruments: gong chimes, reed instruments, metallophones, xylophones, drums, and ching. A Thai ensemble consists of stringed fiddles, flutes, zither, xylophones, gong circles, drums, and ching. Melody in both Thai and Khmer musics is regulated by cyclic patterns realized on the drums and ching.

== Historical significance ==
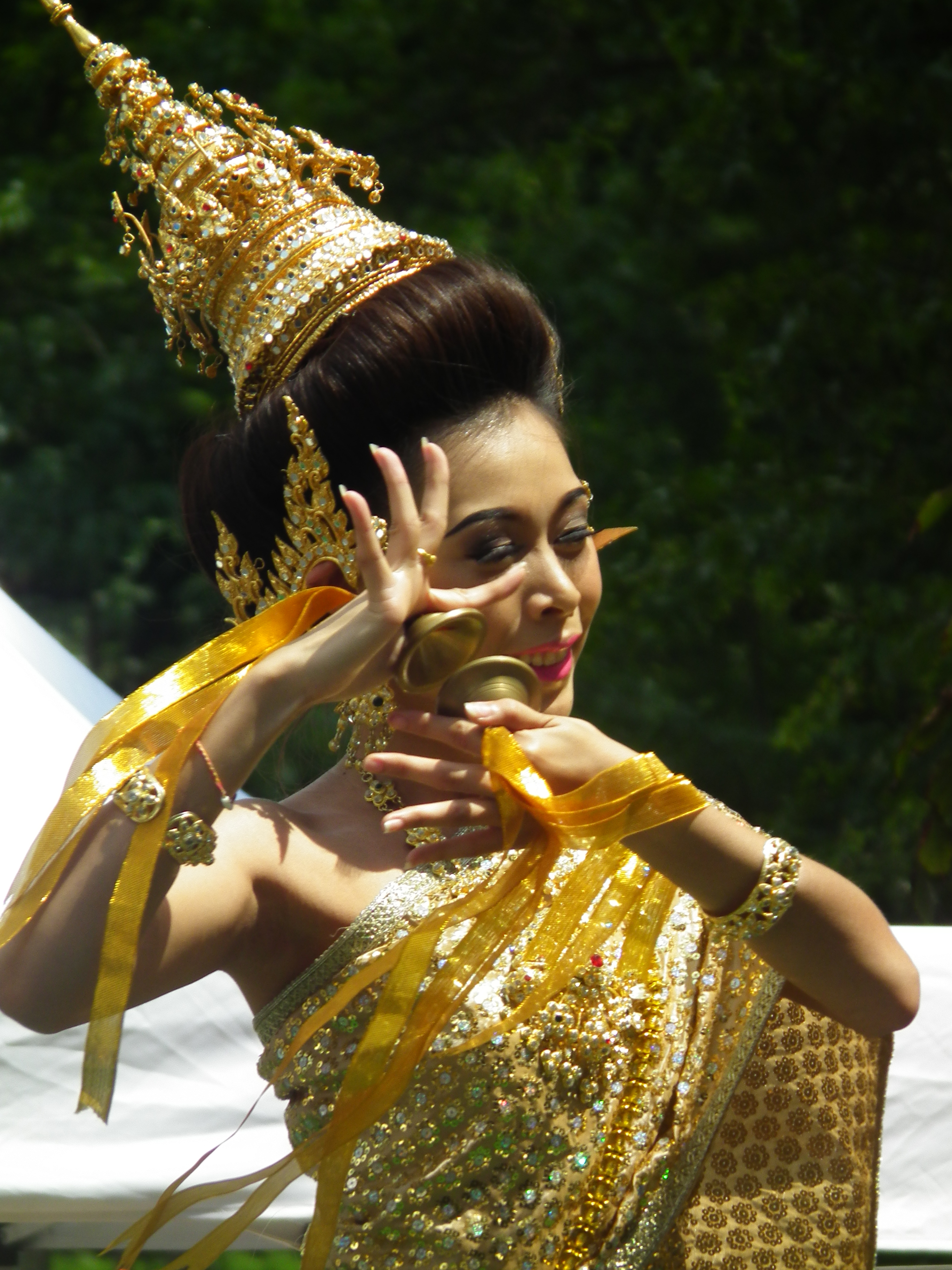
Ching used by a dancer in Thailand.

The history of the cymbal is not exactly known, but it is assumed to have come from India.

== See also ==
- Music of Cambodia
- Music of Thailand
