= Adda Angel =

Cambodian songwriter and music producer (born 1989)

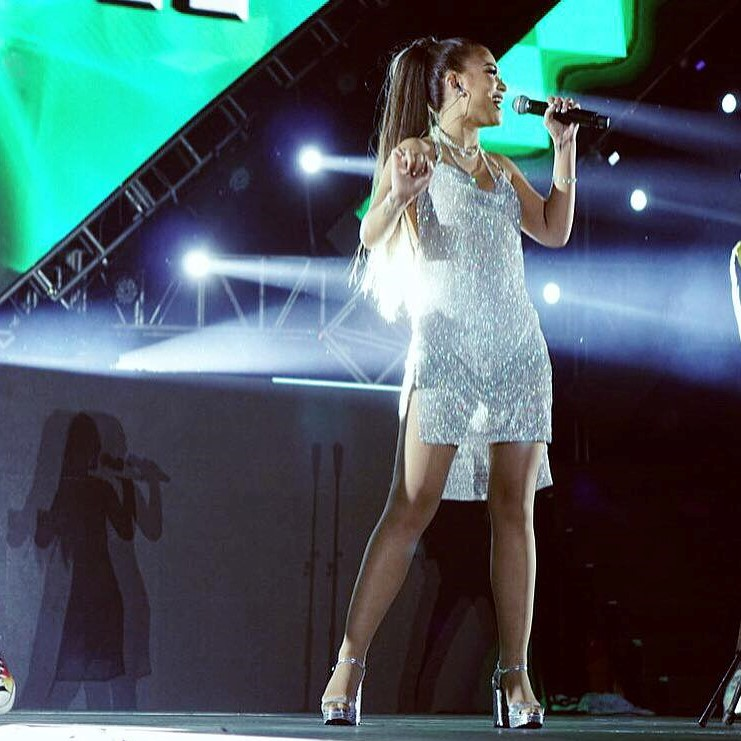
- Adda performing live at the Smart MEGA 2017 with CL (singer)

Background information
- Born: Sar Chakrya Thon; 1989 (age 36–37); Phnom Penh, Cambodia
- Genres: Pop Music, New Wave Cambodian Original Music
- Occupations: Singer; songwriter; music producer
- Years active: 2006–present
- Label: Smart Music

Sar Chakrya Thon (born 1989), known professionally as Adda Angel, is a Cambodian songwriter and music producer. She is known for being a pioneer in the Cambodian Original Music Movement.

== Life and career ==
Adda began her career as one of Cambodia's first female rap artist with the stage name DJ Adda. She is currently considered one of the top female pop stars of the new Cambodian Original Music scene. She has shared the stage with international acts such as CL (singer) and Rain (entertainer). She is currently signed to Smart Axiata Music Division.

Adda has been an outspoken proponent for original song composition in the Cambodian music industry, publicly criticizing trends in Cambodian contemporary music which copies melodies from existing foreign songs.

In 2012, Adda had a public Facebook row with Cambodian actor Kong Chomrong. The matter escalated to with threats of legal action but was ultimately resolved out of court.

Her top three songs, គ្រាប់ពេជ្រ (Diamond), ពីរនាក់បានហេីយ (Just the Two of Us) and ភ្លើង (Fire) have over 20 million views on YouTube, with Diamond staying in the Top 10 Smart Music Chart for over one year.

In November, 2017, she announced her relationship with American-Cambodian product designer and businessman Allen Dodgson Tan.

In April, 2018, Adda announced the opening of her own beauty salon named Adda & Hair, located in Phnom Penh.

== As actress/presenter ==
Television
Year	Title	Role	Network	Notes
2018	The Melody	Judge	Bayon Television	Season 1

== Discography ==
ពីរនាក់បានហេីយ (Just the Two of Us)

- Released: 26 November 2016
- Label: Smart Music
- Writer: Adda Angel
- Producer: Noly

គ្រាប់ពេជ្រ (Diamond)

- Released: 25 March 2017
- Label: Smart Music
- Writer: Adda Angel
- Producer: JR Record

ភ្លើង (Fire)

- Released: 27 May 2016
- Label: Smart Music
- Writer: Adda Angel
- Producer: JR Record

== Achievements ==
Year	Category	Institution or publication	Result	Notes	Ref.
2017	Most Popular Female Artist	The Mic Cambodia	Won		
