= Keo Sarath =

Cambodian musician

Keo Sarath (Khmer: កែវ សារ៉ាត់, born Tek Chhom ឈុំ តេះ; March 10, 1956 – September 5, 1991) was a Cambodian singer who expressed the trauma of the Khmer people in the wake of the Khmer Rouge terror regime and subsequent invasion of Cambodia by Vietnam.

== Biography ==
Keo Sarath was born on March 10, 1956, in Wat Kampheng Village, Srong Battambang District, Battambang Province.

After escaping alive from the bloody Khmer Rouge regime, he lived in a refugee camp on the Khmer-Thai border of Khao-I-Dang where he began his musical career and married with his first wife. While their newborn just had been born she left for another man, which broke the heart of Keo Sarath. He then sought asylum and traveled on his own to the United States, to Boston. He married another Khmer woman named Chan Thou. They had 3 more children.

After the death under the Khmer Rouge of Sinn Sisamouth which was seen as an irreplaceable loss for Khmer singing, Keo Sarath was one of the first popular singers to arouse such enthusiasm, along with female singer Song Senhorn. He was nicknamed the "Tiger Jaw Emperor" and was a living artist with whom new generations could compare.

He struggled through the cruel Khmer-Rouge regime. After escaping he lived in the border of Thailand and then got married with his first wife. While their newborn just had been born she left for another man. Doing so, left Mr. Sarath full of sadness and abandoned with his child.

He later went back to visit his birthplace and home, Cambodia. While visiting, he was fascinated by the new atmosphere and surroundings as the country returned to peace and monarchy.

Keo Sarath died on September 5, 1991, in Long Beach, California, at the age of 35 from Hepatitis B, which he has contracted in the camps.

== Musical style ==
The songs of Keo Sarath are often sad and nostalgic and are impregnated with love of Khmer country, such as Sranos Dei Khmer, Pisakh Doeum Chhnam, Dei thmey Chen thmey. His songs narrate the lives of Cambodian people at the refugee camps, the war, the Vietnamese occupation, the presence of the United Nations Transitional Authority in Cambodia.

== Posterity ==
Many covers continued to be made of the songs of Keo Sarath. For new generations, and survivors of these transitional years in Cambodia, the songs of Keo Sarath are a modern form of intangible cultural heritage and a witness to a time of which little documentation has made it to the present day.

== Sources ==
- Songs and the Politics in Cambodia Part I
