= Kong Nay =

Cambodian traditional musician and master of the chapei (1944–2024)

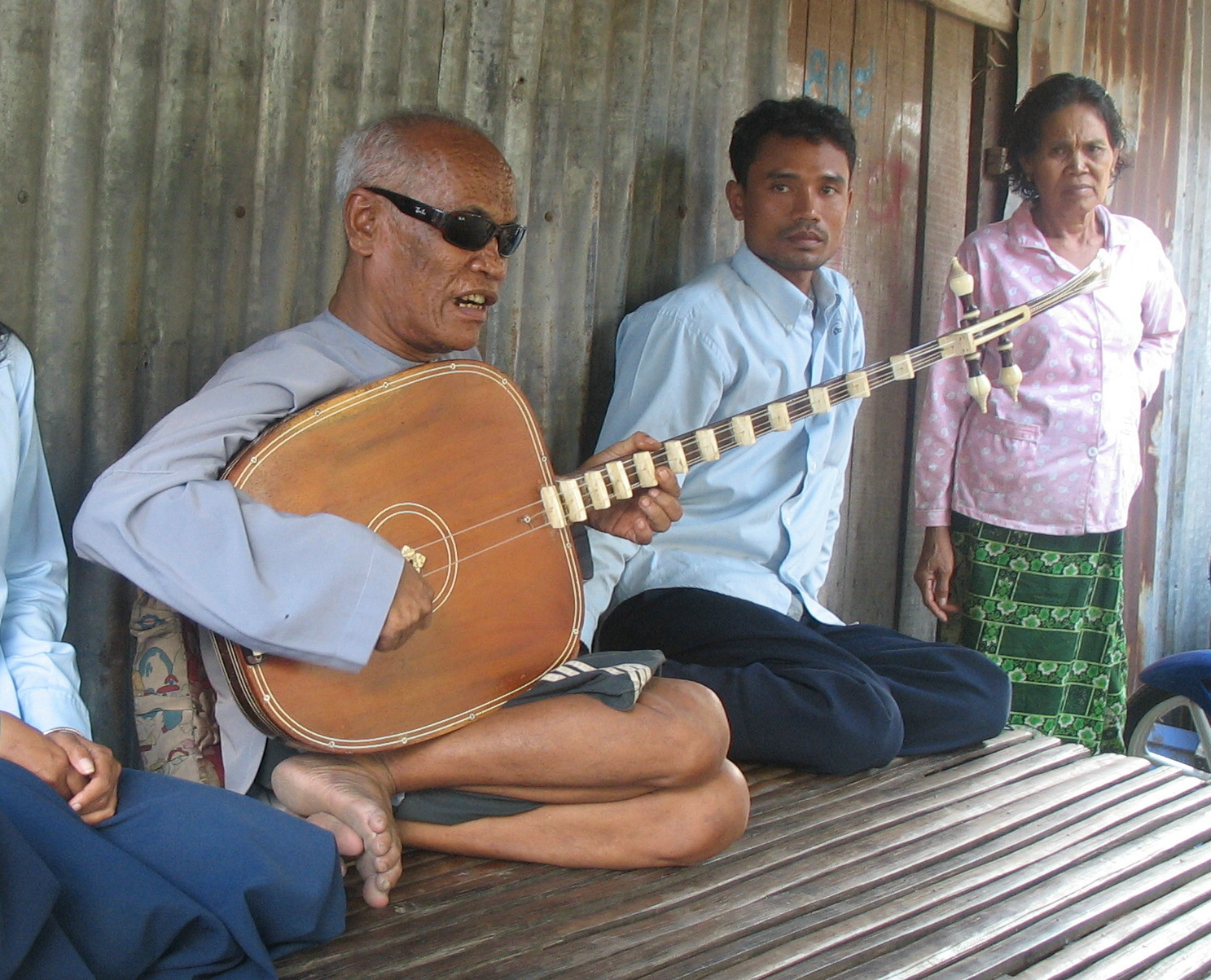
Kong Nay playing the chapei dang veng, Phnom Penh, 2007

Kong Nay (Khmer: គង់ ណៃ), also known as Kong Nai (15 March 1944 – 28 June 2024), was a Cambodian musician from Kampot Province in southwestern Cambodia who played a traditional long-necked fretted plucked lute called chapei dang veng.

Commonly referred to as Master Kong Nay, he was a master of the chrieng chapei genre (Khmer: ច្រៀងចាប៉ី), in which a solo vocalist performs semi-improvised topical material within traditional epics self-accompanied with the chapei.

He was one of relatively few great masters to have survived the Khmer Rouge era, and was known as the "Ray Charles of Cambodia". Though his music was very different to Charles, the similarity they hold is that Kong Nay was also blind. The fact that most of the remaining chapei masters, such as Prach Chhoun and Neth Pe, are blind was a rather remarkable coincidence.

He received the 2017 Fukuoka Arts and Culture Prize.

== Early life ==
Kong grew up in a poor family in Daung village, in Kampong Trach district's Svay Tong Khang Choeung commune, Kampot province. At the age of four, he contracted smallpox resulting in his blindness. Drawn to the sound of the chapei players in his village, he mimicked the sound of the instrument until his father was able to purchase a used instrument. Learning from his great uncle Kong Kith, Kong Nay became proficient quickly. By 18, he was playing professionally and married Tat Chhan.

== Post-war ==
After winning a national chapei competition in 1991, the Ministry of Culture gave him a monthly salary of $19 and some land in Phnom Penh's Dey Krahom area, near the White Building in Tonle Bassac.

== Death ==
In May 2022, Kong was hospitalised for treatment for high blood pressure, diabetes and lung problems at Kampot provincial hospital. Kong's son, Samphors, was quoted as saying his father may not play the chapei again.

On 28 June 2024, Kong died at his home in Kampong Trach District in Kampot province. He was 80.

== Awards and recognition ==
- Gold Grand Cross of Cambodia Cultural Reputation (2007)
- Fukuoka Arts and Culture Prize (2017)

== Discography ==
- Un Barde Cambodgien (Chant Et Luth Chapey), released by Maison Des Cultures Du Monde (2003)
- Mekong Delta Blues as Master Kong Nay with Ouch Savy, Long Tale Recordings (2007)

=== Other appearances ===
- Master Kong Nai, by Kong Nai & DENGUE FEVER from Sleepwalking through the Mekong OST, released on M80 Records (2009)
- 3 Songs For Human Rights, by Master Kong Nay with The Cambodian Space Project, released by Bophana Audiovisual Resource Center (2012)
- Time To Rise, by VannDa featuring Kong Nai, released by Baramey Production (2021)

== Notable performances ==
- 2007: WOMAD (World of Music, Arts and Dance), Wiltshire, UK
- 2008: WOMAD New Zealand, New Plymouth, New Zealand; WOMADelaide, Adelaide, Australia
- 2009: World Chamber Music #4 Kong Nay, Tokyo, Japan
- 2013: Season of Cambodia (SOC) Festival, New York, US
- 2015: Geidai 21: Geidai Arts Special 2015－Disability & Arts, Tokyo, Japan
