= Khmer shadow theatre =

Cambodian form of shadow play

Khmer shadow theatre ល្ខោនណាំងស្បែក
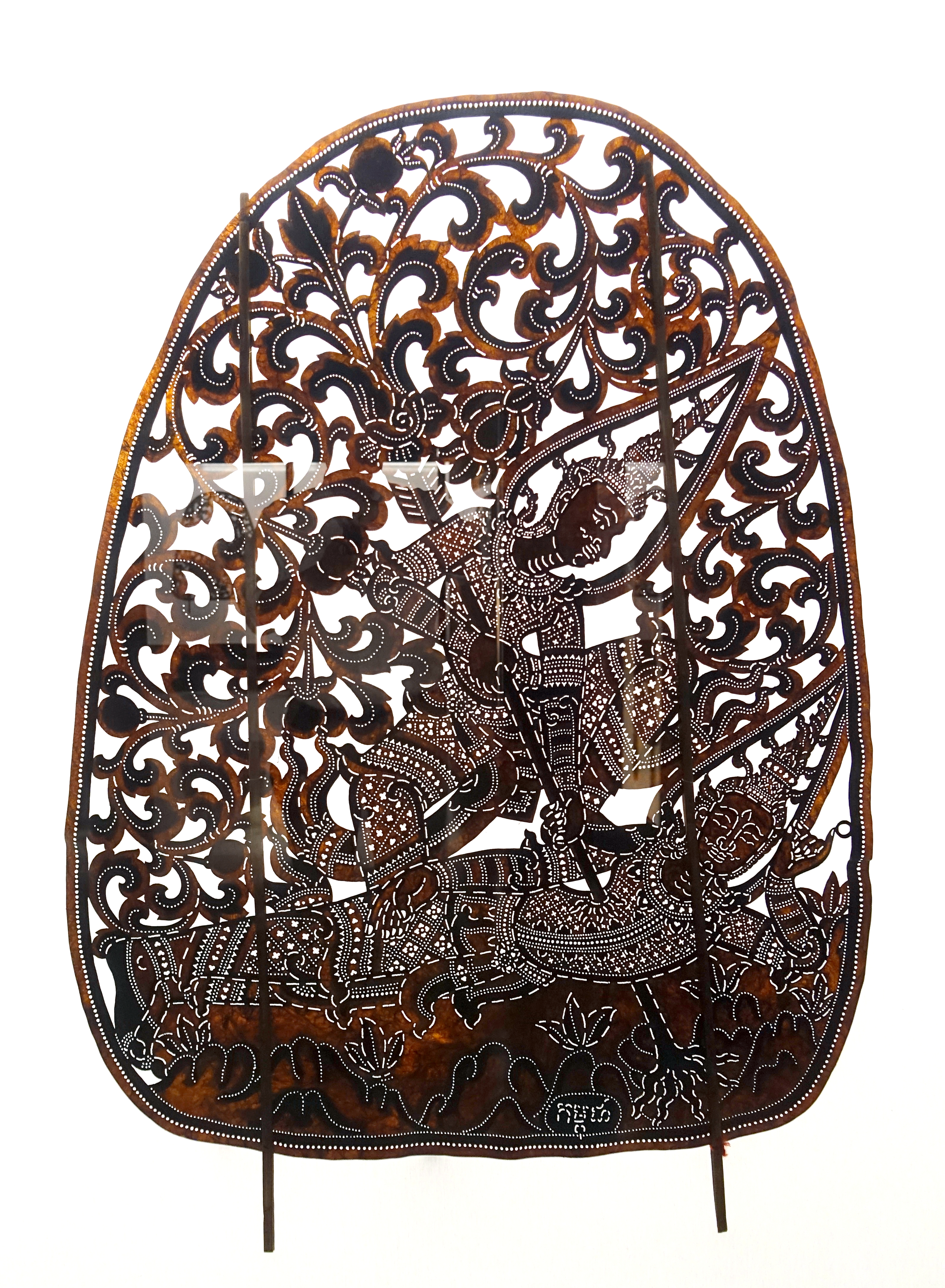
- A figure plate used in Nang sbek thom drama
- Medium: Shadow play
- Types: Sbek Thom, Sbek Toch, Sbek Por
- Originating culture: Khmer

Sbek Thom, Khmer shadow theatre
- UNESCO Intangible Cultural Heritage
- Country: Cambodia
- Reference: 00108
- Region: Asia and the Pacific

Inscription history
- Inscription: 2008 (3rd session)
- List: Representative

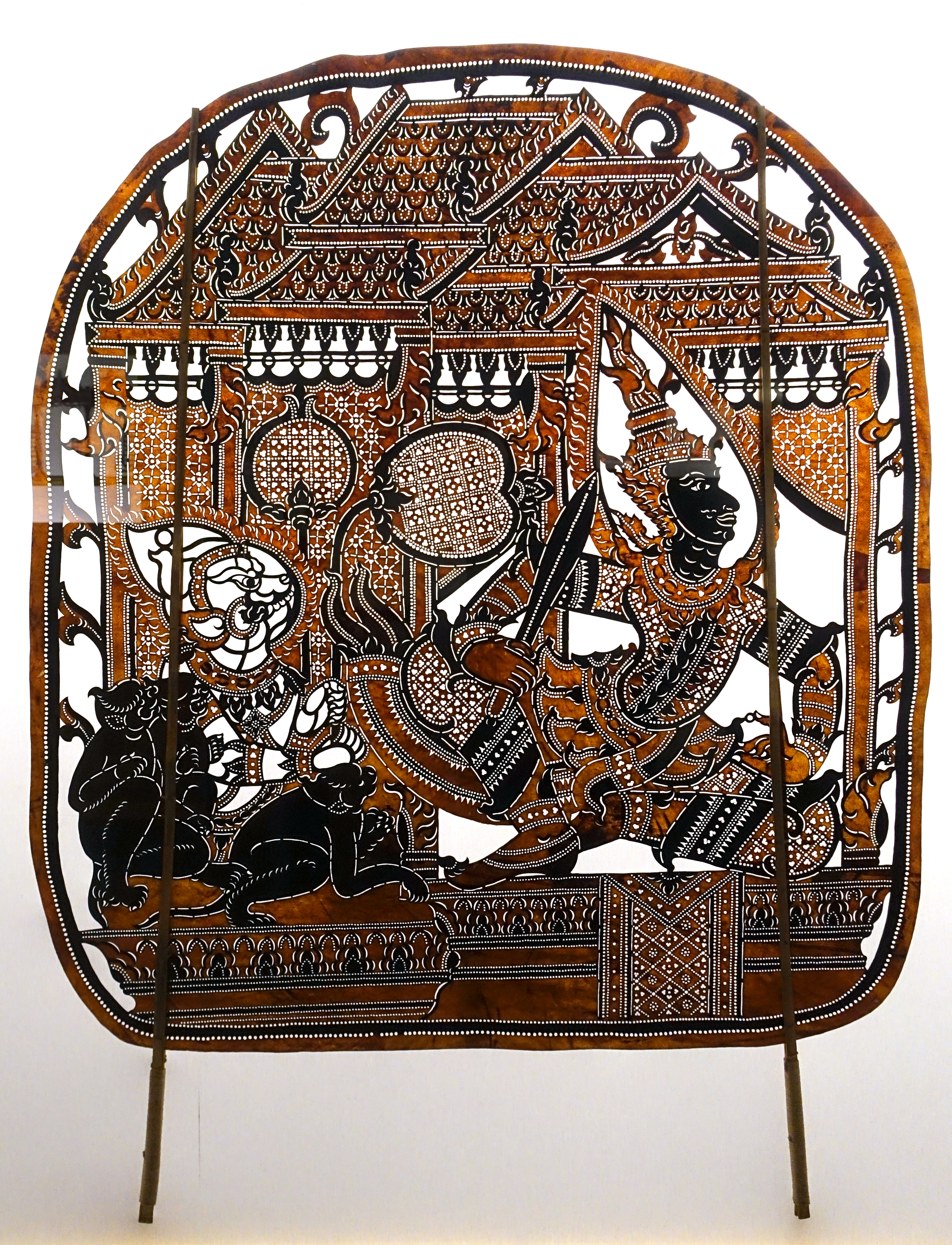
A figure plate used in Nang sbek thom drama

Khmer shadow theatre (Khmer: ល្ខោនណាំងស្បែក, Lakhaon Nang Sbek; IPA: [lkʰaon naŋ sɓaek]) are forms of shadow play in which leather shadow puppets are used. The two main genres are Sbek Thom, which features the Reamker, and Sbek Toch, which uses smaller puppets and a wide range of stories. Another genre called Sbek Por uses colored leather puppets. The shadow plays of Cambodia are closely related to and also resemble the shadow plays of Thailand (Nang yai and Nang talung), Indonesia (Wayang and Wayang kulit). In Cambodia, the shadow play is called Nang Sbek Thom, or simply as Sbek Thom (literally "large leather hide"), Sbek Toch ("small leather hide") and Sbek Por ("colored leather hide").

It is performed during sacred temple ceremonies, at private functions, and for the public in Cambodia's villages. The popular plays include the Ramayana and Mahabharata epics, as well as other Hindu myth and legends. The performance is accompanied by a pinpeat orchestra.

The Sbek Thom is based on the Cambodian version of the Indian epic Ramayana, an epic story about good and evil involving Rama, Sita, Lakshmana, Hanuman and Ravana. It is a sacred performance, embodying Khmer beliefs built on the foundations and mythologies of Brahmanism and Buddhism.

Cambodian shadow puppets are made of cow hide, and their size are usually quite large, depicting a whole scene, including its background. Unlike their Javanese counterparts, Cambodian shadow puppets are usually not articulated, rendering the figure's hands unmovable, and are left uncolored, retaining the original color of the leather. The main shadow puppet production center is Roluos near Siem Reap. Cambodian shadow puppetry is one of the cultural performances staged for tourists alongside Cambodian traditional dances.

The Sbek Thom figures are unlike puppets because they are large and heavy, with no moveable parts. The Sbek Touch, in contrast, are much smaller puppets with movable parts; their shows have been more popular. The Sbek Thom shadow play involves many puppeteers dancing on the screen, each puppeteer playing one character of the Ramayana, while separate narrators recite the story accompanied by an orchestra.

== See also ==
- Shadow play
- Theatre of Cambodia
- Wayang
