= VannDa =

Cambodian rapper (born 1997)

VannDa KCM
- វណ្ណដា
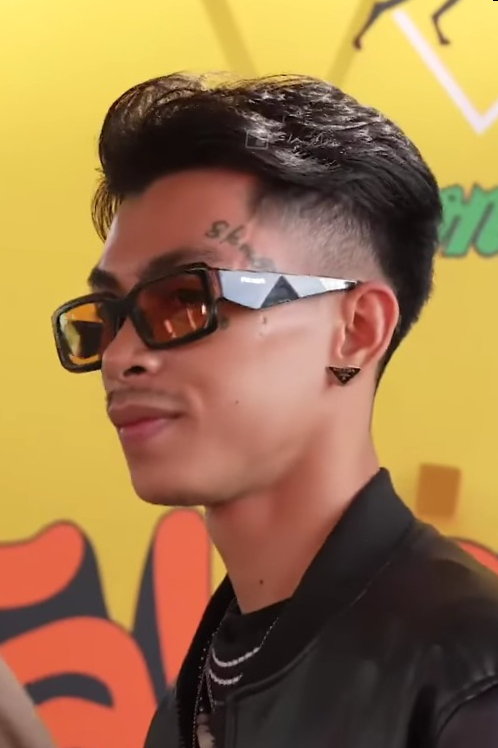
- VannDa in 2024
- Born: Man Vann Da; 22 January 1997 (age 29); Sihanoukville, Cambodia
- Occupations: Rapper; singer; songwriter; record producer
- Years active: 2014–present
- Musical career
- Origin: Phnom Penh, Cambodia
- Genres: Hip-hop; R&B; progressive rap; folk; pop rap
- Labels: Baramey; Empire; Acoustic

Man Vann Da KCM (Khmer: ម៉ាន់ វណ្ណដា, romanized: Măn Văn Da, Khmer pronunciation: [man ʋan.ɗaː]; born 22 January 1997), known mononymously as VannDa, is a Cambodian rapper, singer, songwriter, and record producer. He rose to prominence with his 2021 single "Time to Rise", featuring Kong Nay, which became a cultural milestone in Cambodian popular music. He has since been described by NME as "one of Cambodia's most exciting contemporary artists".

== Childhood ==
Man Vann Da was born on 22 January 1997, in Sihanoukville, Preah Sihanouk Province, Cambodia. His father, Man Bunheng, and mother, Kang Kuemsiek, owned a family-run coconut-shaving business at Phsa Leu, a market in Sihanoukville. He has two older siblings, Sophi and Vann Di. His passion for music began at a young age and he recalls wanting to become a famous performer since then. He began pursuing rapping from listening to music online and considers music as his “friend”. Vann Da’s main inspirations are rappers Kanye West and Kid Cudi.

== Career ==
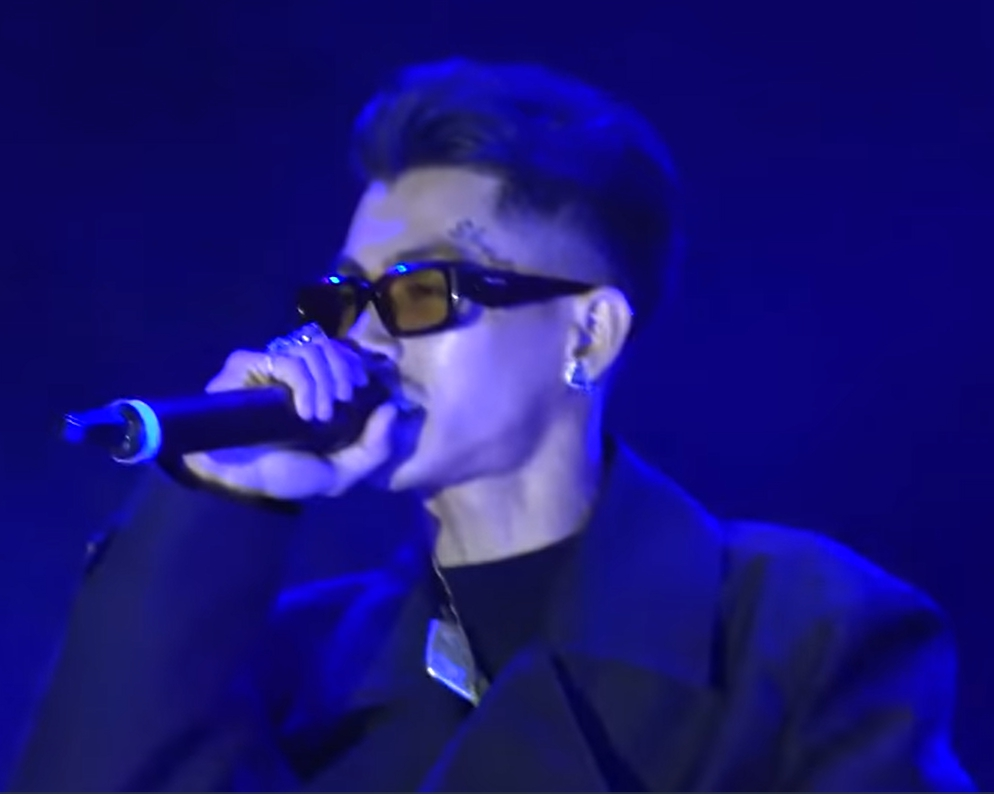
VannDa performing in 2024

After several independent releases, from 2016 to 2018, In 2019, VannDa joined Baramey Production, a Cambodian talent management and music production company founded by Cambodian-American singer-songwriter, Laura Mam, that pioneered the “Khmer original music movement”.

=== "Time to Rise" ===
Originally released as part of a marketing campaign for mobile network, Cellcard, "Time to Rise" blends traditional Khmer instrumentation and singing with hip-hop. The song features celebrated chrieng chapei artist Master Kong Nay, who contributes chapei playing and sings verses. The lyrics serve as a call to arms for Cambodian youth to preserve the traditions and knowledge of the past and carry the torch into the future, bringing originality and creativity to Cambodia's modern cultural scene. The song quickly became a legitimate pop hit, surpassing one-million views in three months.

The music video was filmed at the National Museum of Cambodia in Phnom Penh, showcasing the building's unique architecture, and features VannDa and Master Kong Nay in traditional Khmer clothing.

In October 2022, the music video for "Time to Rise" reached 100 million views on YouTube, a first for a Cambodian artist.

On 25 October, VannDa announced a 100 million riel (approx. US$25,000) fundraising campaign to support Kong Nay, whose health has seen decline in 2022.

In 2024 VannDa performed alongside Phoenix, Angèle, Ezra Koenig and Kavinsky at the 2024 Summer Olympics closing ceremony in Paris.

== Achievements ==
- First Cambodian musical artist to reach 100 million views on YouTube
- Time To Rise named Best Video of the year (2021) by LiFTED Asia
- Ranked #6 in LiFTED Asia's Top 50 artists of 2022
- Ranked #6 in LiFTED Asia's Top 50 artists of 2023

== Discography ==
Singles:

- Y.O.U (2014)
- ចម្រៀងជូនex (2025)
- ហត់ (2016)
- គេជាអ្នកណា (2016)
- ឈឺទេ (2017)
- Back In The Day (2018)
- ចាប់ផ្ដើម&បញ្ចប់ Start & Stop (2018)

Albums:

- $kull the Album, (2020)
- Skull 2 (Season 1), (2021–2022)
- Treyvisai I: The Search for Light (2025)
- Treyvisai II: Burn Like the Sun (2025)
- Treyvisai III: Return to Sovannaphum (2025)

== Collaborations ==
VannDa has collaborated with various Cambodian artists including label mates Sophia Kao, La Cima Cartel, Khmeng Khmer, as well as Thai rappers F.Hero, 1MILL and OG Bobby.

- Gamer អត់លិត (ft. Sok Neng) (2015)
- ភ្លៀងហើយអូន - (ft. Song Song) (2016)
- Player - (feat. Temp Tris, Rawyer, Snooga, Reezy Khmer: អ្នកលេង ft. ថេមប៉ូ ទ្រីស, រ៉យើរ, ស៊្នូហ្គា, រុីហ្សុី) (2018)
- J+O (Remix) ft. Reezy & Khmer1Jivit (2019)
- ម្តាយ (MAMA) - (feat. ក្មេងខ្មែរ) (2020)
- Follow Ma Dance - (feat. ប៉ូឡារិច, ឡូរ៉ាម៉ម, ក្មេងខ្មែរ) (2020)
- Be With You - (ft. Laura Mam & Polarix) (2020)
- HIK HIK - (ft. BAD BOY BERT) (2020)
- ALL3RGY - LA CIMA NIGHT (feat. VannDa, SONGHA, RXTHY, YCN RAKHIE) (2020)
- Time - (feat. Sophia Kao) (2021)
- Time To Rise - (feat. Master Kong Nay) (2021)
- MONSOON - (feat. Songha) (2021)
- RUN THE TOWN - (feat. F.HERO, 1MILL & SPRITE) (2022)
- Young Man - (feat. OG Bobby) (2022)
- BONG - (feat. OG Bobby) (2022)
- កម្លោះស្រុកខ្មែរ - (Khmer Gentlemen) (feat. Vanthan) (2023)
- ចងចាំសាវតារ - (Legacy) (Baramey Crew) (2023)
- VannDa - 6 Years in the Game (feat. AWICH) (2024)
- Kwan - មេឃបើកថ្ងៃ (feat. VannDa) (2024)
- Mesa - ដូចមេ [Doch May - Like a Boss] (feat. VannDa) (2024)
- Vanthan - មិនអាចវិលវិញ - Point of No Return (feat. VannDa) (2024)
- Norith - ក្រមុំស្រុកណា (feat. VannDa) (2024)
- Zedes - Sidequest feat. VannDa (2024)
- Awich, Jay Park, Kr$na, Masiwei & VannDa - Asian State of Mind (Prod. Diego Ave) (2025)
- VannDa - Smoke Up (feat. Younghom) (2025)
- VannDa - Love Sick Blue (feat. Thinlamphone) (2025)
- VannDa - Zerd Zerd (feat. Norith) (2025)
- VannDa - 50-50 (feat. Vanthan) (2025)
- Vanthan - ចែចង់ (LET ME LOVE YOU) FEAT. NORITH & VANNDA (2025)
- VannDa - Make Your Luck (feat. Vanthan) (2025)
- Norith - Cigarettes After War (feat. Vannda) (2025)
- Norith - Decade Of Love (feat. Vannda) (2026)
- Suzana - TIKI TIKI feat. VANNDA (2026)
- Vito - Dai Thmey feat. VANNDA (2026)
