= Pinphat =

Pinphat is a traditional Lao ensemble used to accompanied in Laotian shadow theater and masked theater Phralak Phralam, the Laotian version of Indian Ramaya. This ensemble was adopted from the Khmer orchestra.

Pinphat is analogous to Khmer Pinpeat and Thai Piphat.

== Etymology ==
As Pinphat was adopted from the Khmer traditional ensemble called Pinpeat, the pronunciation is very similar to its Cambodian cousin and sharing the same words root from Sanskrit vînâ and vadya meaning 'musical instrument'.

== See also ==
- Khene
