= Khao-I-Dang =

Khao-I-Dang Holding Center เขาอีด่าง
- Refugee camp
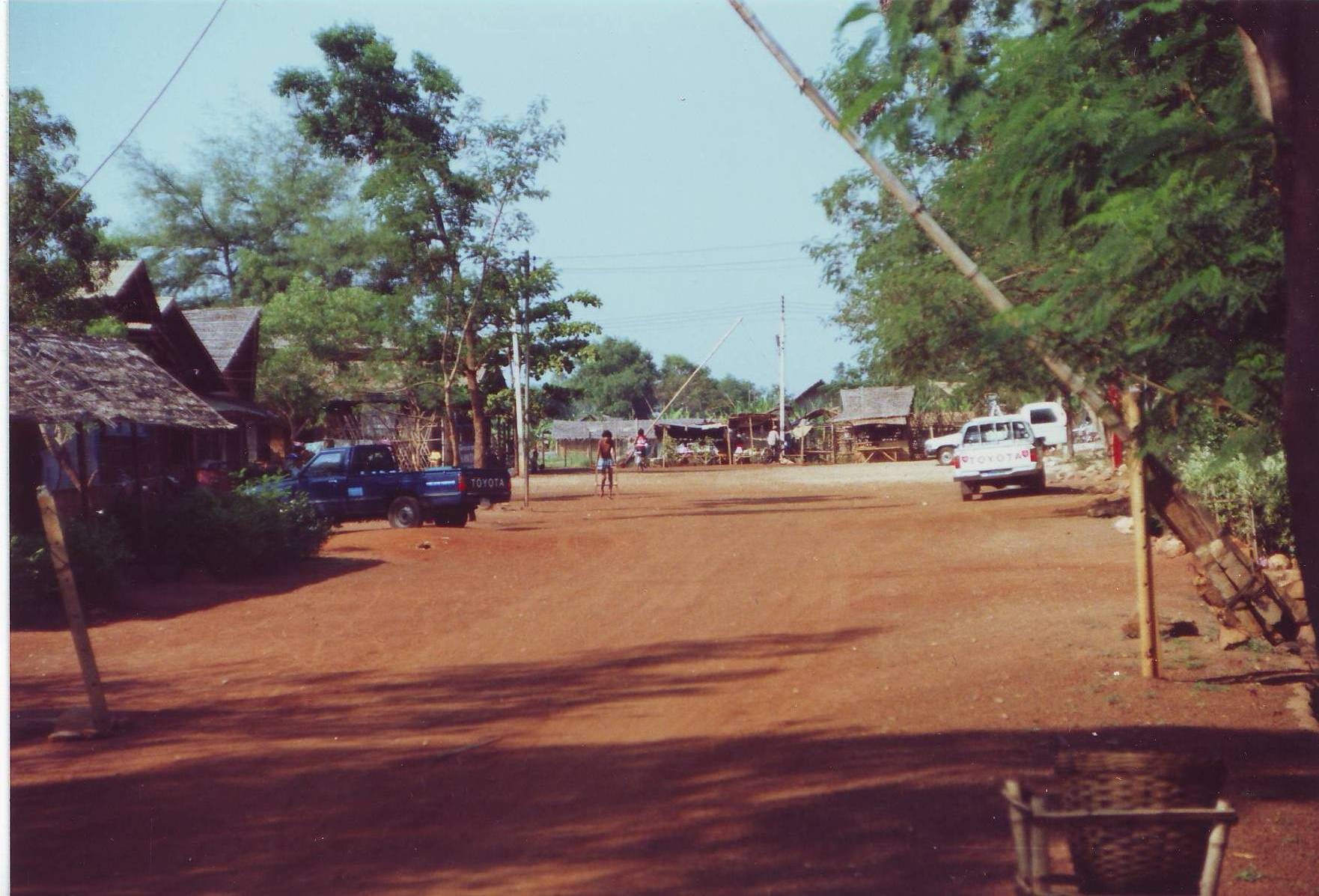
- Khao-I-Dang, April 1990
- Nickname: KID
- Location in Thailand
- Coordinates: 13°53′38″N 102°40′03″E
- Country: Thailand
- Constructed by UNHCR on the orders of the Royal Thai Government: 21 November 1979

Area
  - Total: 2.3 km^{2} (0.89 sq mi)

Population (March 1980)
  - Total: 160,000
  - Density: 69,565/km^{2} (180,170/sq mi)

The Khao-I-Dang (KID) Holding Center (Thai: เขาอีด่าง, Khmer: ខៅអ៊ីដាង) was a Cambodian refugee camp 20 km north of Aranyaprathet in Prachinburi (now Ta Phraya District, Sa Kaeo Province, Thailand). The longest-lived refugee camp on the Thai-Cambodian border, it was established in late 1979, administered by the Thai Interior Ministry and the United Nations High Commissioner for Refugees (UNHCR), unlike other camps on the border, which were administered by a coalition made up of UNICEF, the World Food Programme, International Committee of the Red Cross (ICRC) (briefly), and after 1982, the United Nations Border Relief Operation (UNBRO). The camp held refugees fleeing the Cambodian–Vietnamese War.

== Camp construction ==
In eastern Thailand, a few miles from the Cambodian border, a compound of bamboo and thatch houses was opened on 21 November 1979 after the fall of the Khmer Rouge. Following the establishment of an emergency camp for refugees at Sa Kaeo, the Thai Ministry of the Interior authorized Mark Malloch Brown of the UNHCR to build a second camp at the foot of Khao-I-Dang Mountain.

According to Martin Barber, Chief of UNHCR's Kampuchean Unit, "The site, covering an area of 2.3 square kilometers on a gently sloping hill, had good drainage. It opened...after just four days of preparatory work spent in establishing the overall design of the camp and developing the basic infrastructure (roads, water tanks, and latrines) of the first "chunk". The camp was divided into sections holding 10,000-12,000 people. Each section had space allocated for reasonable housing and for necessary services including supplementary feeding.

== Camp population ==
On 19 October 1979, Thai Prime Minister Kriangsak Chomanan enacted an "open door" policy which permitted Cambodian refugees to cross the border safely and to reside in specific locations. Khao-I-Dang (known to aid agencies as KID) was intended to serve as a temporary holding center for refugees who would either be repatriated to Cambodia or expatriated to third countries when circumstances allowed so. On the first day 4,800 people arrived and by 31 December there were 84,800. Between November 1979 and the end of January 1980 an average of 1,600 refugees arrived in the camp each day. Thailand's open door policy was abruptly ended on 24 January 1980 and KID was closed to new arrivals.

Originally planned to hold 300,000 refugees, the population eventually reached 160,000 in March 1980. Later, as KID became the main holding center for refugees awaiting third country visas, illegal entry to the camp was highly sought after by refugees desperate to escape from Cambodia, and smuggling, theft, and violence spiraled out of control. In July and August 1980 UNHCR began transferring large numbers of refugees out of KID to Phanat Nikhom, Sa Kaeo II, Mairut, and Kap Choeng. By December 1982 the population had dropped to 40,134 as refugees were forcibly repatriated, sent to third countries, or sent back to the border camps.

=== Camp residents ===
The presence at Khao-I-Dang of a large number of refugees with education and experience in administration, health, teaching, or technical skills reduced the language problems and allowed early involvement of refugees in all fields of activities.

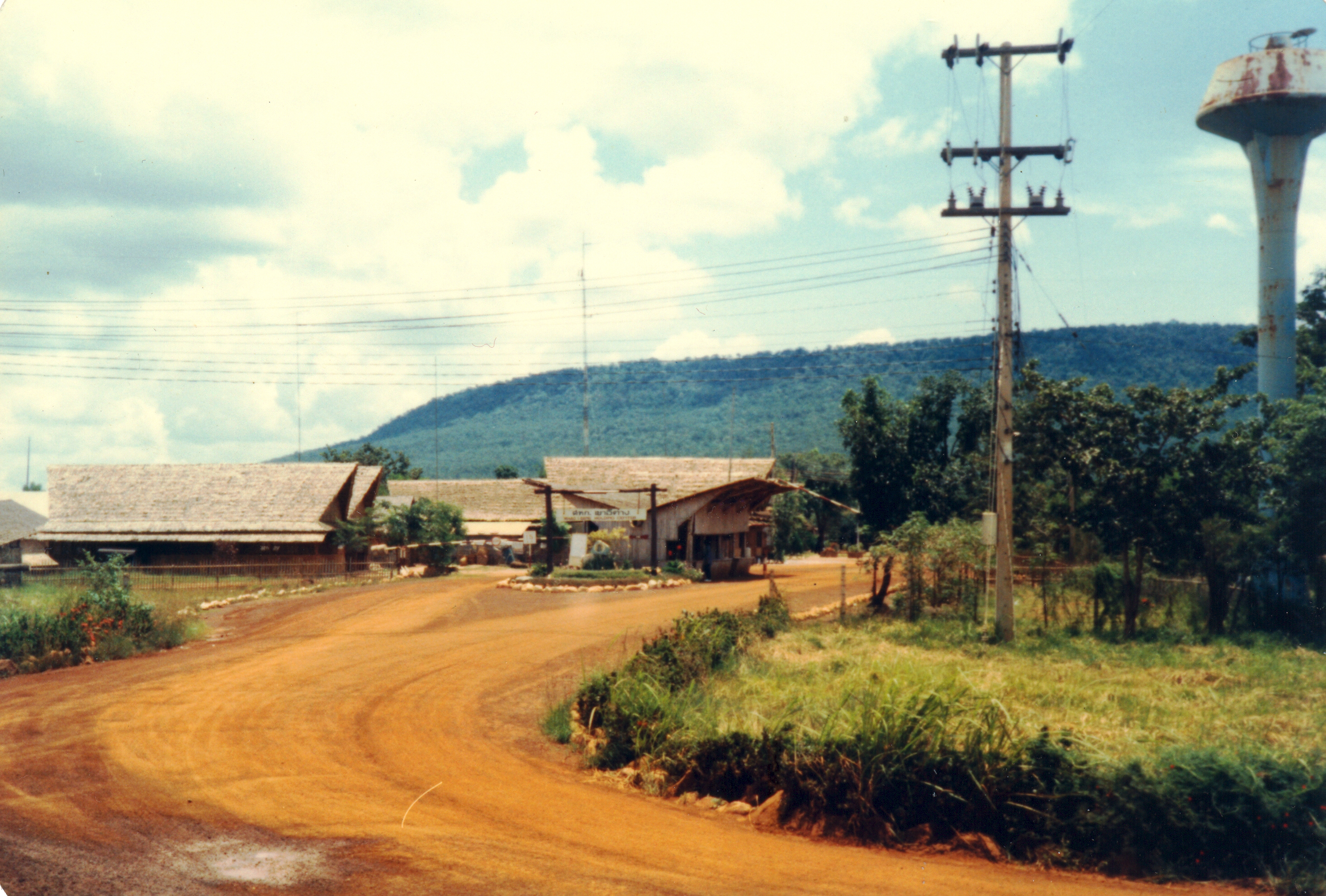
Khao-I-Dang entrance, as seen from Thai National Hwy 348, May 1984. In the background is Khao-I-Dang Mountain; to the right is one of two water towers which stored water for the camp.

Many Cambodians recall spending some time at KID, including Dr Haing S. Ngor of the film The Killing Fields, who (as a refugee) was employed in 1979 in the 400-bed ICRC hospital. The final scene in the film was shot at KID in 1983, in the surgical ward where Dr. Ngor had worked. Former refugees who have described their experiences in Khao-I-Dang include Molyda Szymusiak, Chanrithy Him, Oni Vitandham, and Mohm Phat.

== Camp services ==
Provision of adequate food and water was a major logistical problem. Water was brought in each day by trucks from supply areas one to two hours away. Water was rationed to 10–15 liters per person per day in the camp and 50–60 liters per hospitalized patient per day).

Educational and medical services were provided by Thai and international relief organizations. KID soon became the most serviced camp on the Thai-Cambodian border. It may have been the most elaborately serviced refugee camp in the world. By early-1980, 37 voluntary agencies were working in the camp. Most health services were provided by ICRC, Doctors Without Borders, the Thai Red Cross, CARE, Irish Concern, Catholic Relief Services, the International Rescue Committee, the American Refugee Committee, Christian and Missionary Alliance, OXFAM, Handicap International, Malteser International, and YWAM.

=== Camp hospital ===
ICRC chose KID for their first border surgical hospital where acute trauma patients were cared for, at first mainly war wounded, but later large numbers of landmine victims. Surgical equipment was donated from the French hospital ship L'Île de Lumière. Initially two hospitals (A and B) were constructed with 900 beds each in 17 wards: four pediatric wards, including one intensive feeding center; two wards for gynecology and obstetrics; two surgical wards, including an admission and emergency center; one tuberculosis center; and eight general medicine wards, In addition, there was a surgical unit with two operating rooms containing four operating tables, and a post-operative unit. There also were two hospital kitchens, a warehouse, a laboratory, and an x-ray room. Each ward housed 70-120 patients, and the capacity of the entire facility was about 1,800 patients.

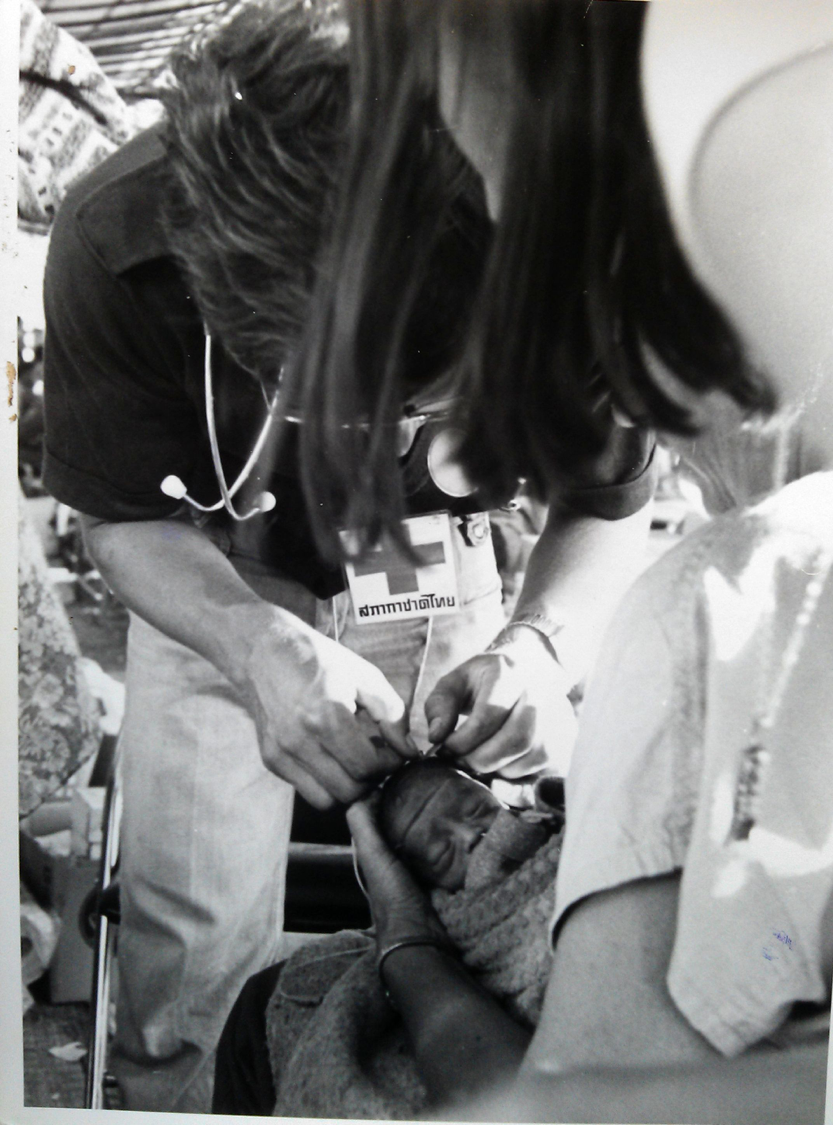
Wim Kools, as one of the early surgeons present in Khao-I-Dang, inserting an intravenous catheter in a young baby.

The ICRC hospital began treating patients on 27 November 1979 and during its first 54 days of operation 521 surgeries were performed, 162 of these related to war injuries, including 22 amputations. Overall, 80% of operations were emergency surgery related to trauma, with the remainder performed to alleviate severe pain or bleeding. During the first two months an average of 9.5 operations per day were performed with a maximum of 16.

By late-1980 Hospital B fell into disuse and was converted into smaller buildings for other purposes, some of which were destroyed in a fire in 1981.

As of June 1984, the medical teams working at KID ICRC Hospital consisted of four surgeons, four anesthesiologists and 13 nurses sent by nine national Red Cross Societies: (Belgium, Finland, France, Iceland, Japan, Norway, Sweden, Switzerland, and the United Kingdom). The medical coordinator and the administrator of the hospital were sent by the New Zealand and the Canadian Red Cross Societies respectively. Moreover, 120 Thai and Khmer medical staff assisted these teams in their work.

UN Secretary-General Kurt Waldheim visited Khao-I-Dang Hospital on 6 August 1980, and Javier Pérez de Cuéllar visited on 27 January 1985. Former President Jimmy Carter and First Lady Rosalynn Carter visited on 6 June 1985.

== Camp closure ==
Khao-I-Dang's size steadily declined as its population was resettled in other countries. It eventually became a camp made up of persons who had been rejected for resettlement; many had been rejected by more than one country. With the prospects of further resettlement diminishing, Thailand declared the camp closed at the end of December 1986. Relocations to border camps of the illegal camp residents began in March 1987. In response to international pressure, selection for resettlement of the residual population was extended again in 1988, after which Thai authorities officially decreed that all remaining refugees would be transferred to the border for repatriation to Cambodia. The residents of KID were vocal in opposition to what they felt was forced repatriation and held numerous demonstrations. By December 1989 camp population was 11,600.

The camp finally closed on 3 March 1993 during the UNTAC operation when all remaining residents were moved to Site Two Refugee Camp to await repatriation to Cambodia. At the closing ceremony, then UNHCR Special Envoy Sérgio Vieira de Mello called KID a "powerful and tragic symbol" of the Cambodian exodus and the international humanitarian response.

== See also ==
- Cambodian humanitarian crisis
- Indochina refugee crisis
- Nong Chan Refugee Camp
- Nong Samet Refugee Camp
