= Art music =

Serious music, as opposed to popular or folk music

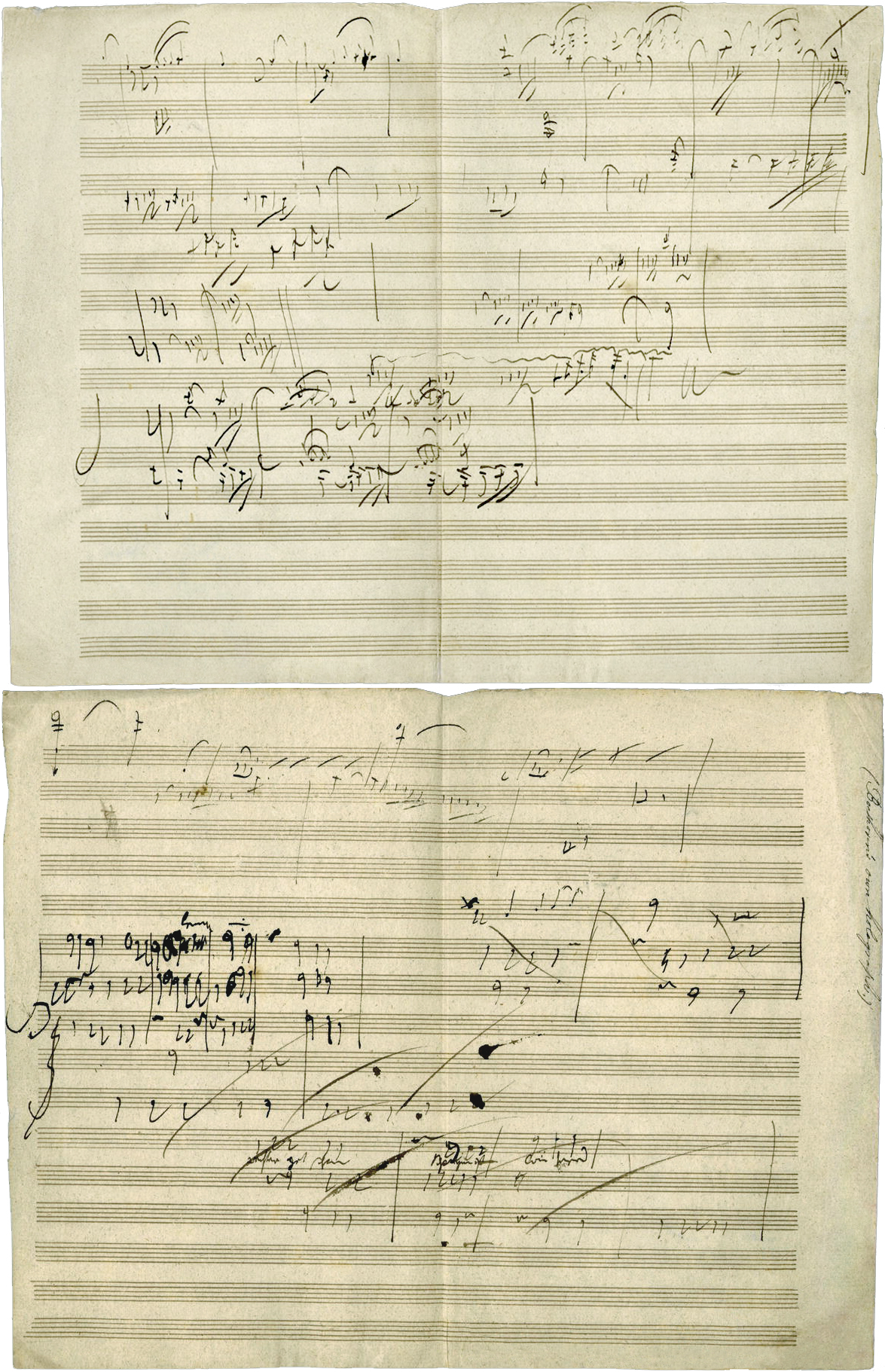
Beethoven's autographic sketch for his Piano Sonata No. 28, Movement IV, Geschwind, doch nicht zu sehr und mit Entschlossenheit (Allegro). He completed the piece in 1816.

Art music (alternatively called classical music, cultivated music, serious music, and canonic music) is music considered to be of high phonoaesthetic value. It typically implies advanced structural and theoretical considerations or a written musical tradition. In this context, the terms "serious" or "cultivated" are frequently used to present a contrast with ordinary, everyday music (i.e. popular and folk music, also called "vernacular music"). Many cultures have art music traditions; in the Western world, the term typically refers to Western classical music.

== Definition ==
In Western literature, "Art music" is mostly used to refer to music descending from the tradition of Western classical music. Musicologist Philip Tagg refers to the elitism associated with art music as one of an "axiomatic triangle consisting of 'folk', 'art' and 'popular' musics". He explains that each of these three is distinguishable from the others according to certain criteria. According to Bruno Nettl, "Western classical music" may also be synonymous with "art music", "canonic music", "cultivated music", "serious music", as well as the more flippantly used "real music" and "normal music". Musician Catherine Schmidt-Jones defines art music as "a music which requires significantly more work by the listener to fully appreciate than is typical of popular music". In her view, "this can include the more challenging types of jazz and rock music, as well as Classical".

The term "art music" refers primarily to classical traditions (including contemporary as well as historical classical music forms) that focus on formal styles, invite technical and detailed deconstruction and criticism, and demand focused attention from the listener. In strict western practice, art music is considered primarily a written musical tradition, preserved in some form of music notation, as opposed to being transmitted orally, by rote, or in recordings (like popular and traditional music).

== Popular music ==
There have been continual attempts throughout the history of popular music to make a claim for itself as art rather than as popular culture, and a number of music styles that were previously understood as "popular music" have since been categorized in the art or classical category. Academic Tim Wall has argued that the most significant example of the struggle between Tin Pan Alley, African-American, vernacular, and art discourses was in jazz. As early as the 1930s, artists attempted to cultivate ideas of "symphonic jazz", taking it away from its perceived vernacular and black American roots. Histories of popular music have since tended to marginalize jazz, Wall wrote in 2013.

At the beginning of the 20th century, art music was divided into "serious music" and "light music". During the second half of the century, there was a large-scale trend in American culture toward blurring the boundaries between art and pop music. Beginning in 1966, the degree of social and artistic dialogue among rock musicians dramatically accelerated for bands who fused elements of composed music with the oral musical traditions of rock. During the late 1960s and 1970s, progressive rock bands represented a form of crossover music that combined rock with high art musical forms either through quotation, allusion, or imitation. Progressive music may be equated with explicit references to aspects of art music, sometimes resulting in the reification of rock as art music.

While progressive rock is often cited for its merging of high culture and low culture, few artists incorporated literal classical themes in their work to any great degree, as author Kevin Holm-Hudson explains: "sometimes progressive rock fails to integrate classical sources ... [it] moves continuously between explicit and implicit references to genres and strategies derived not only from European art music, but other cultural domains (such as East Indian, Celtic, folk, and African) and hence involves a continuous aesthetic movement between formalism and eclecticism".

== See also ==
- List of classical and art music traditions
- Art song
- Music genre
- Progressive music
- Traditional music
