= Stuart Robert Glass =

Canadian sailor

- Born: 25 June 1951; London, United Kingdom
- Died: 13 August 1978 (aged 27); Cambodian sea
- Cause of death: Gunshot
- Occupation: Adventurer

Stuart Robert Glass (25 June 1951 – 13 August 1978) was a Canadian adventurer and yachtsman killed by the Khmer Rouge in August 1978 while sailing a small yacht named Foxy Lady through Cambodian waters. One of nine "Western" yachtsmen known to have been seized by the Democratic Kampuchean regime between April and November 1978, he was the sole Canadian victim of the 1975–79 Cambodian genocide.

== Early life ==
Stuart Robert Glass was born in London, United Kingdom on 25 June 1951. At the age of five he moved with his family to Richmond, British Columbia, Canada. From an early age Glass loved adventure. After completing his tenth grade of high school, Stuart worked for a while in Vancouver and then travelled to London to live and work.

Glass smuggled Moroccan hashish into the UK on three occasions in 1972 and 1973. On the third of these, together with his girlfriend and two other companions, Glass was arrested at UK customs. Following a six-month term at HMP Wormwood Scrubs, he and his female companion—the two now married—navigated the Hippie trail to New Delhi, and from there flew to Australia.

== Travels on Foxy Lady ==
While living in Darwin, the capital of Australia's Northern Territory, Stuart met New Zealander Kerry George Hamill. Glass and Hamill purchased a 28-foot, traditional Malaysian perahu bedar named Foxy Lady. Together with Hamill's Australian girlfriend, Gail Colley, Glass and Hamill sailed Foxy Lady north to Timor, and from there to the island of Flores, in eastern Indonesia, then on to Bali. At this point, Gail Colley left the boat. Jan Seeley crewed with them to Singapore from where they continued to Penang where they were joined by others, including Gail Colley and Phillip Parsonson, and they sailed up the Strait of Malacca to the Thai island of Phuket. Some time in June 1978 — following the departure of Gail Colley — Stuart and Kerry sailed around the tip of the Malaysian peninsula and up to Kuala Terengganu, on Malaysia's eastern coast. There they met Englishman John Dawson Dewhirst, who joined Foxy Lady on her final sail into Cambodian waters.

== Foxy Lady's seizure ==
In the late afternoon or early evening of 13 August 1978, Foxy Lady was seized off Koh Tang (Tang Island) by a patrol boat of the Democratic Kampuchean navy. Two Americans, Lance McNamara and James Clark, had been seized under similar circumstances in late April, while sailing a yacht named Mary K. off Koh Wai (Wai Island). According to New Zealander Rob Hamill, brother of Stuart's murdered friend, Kerry, Foxy Lady had been blown into Cambodian waters by a storm. Other sources suggest the little bedar had ventured here intentionally, on her way to Bangkok, possibly to pick up a load of Thai marijuana. Only one account of Foxy Lady's brutal seizure exists—a single paragraph in one of the "confessions" S-21 interrogators would force John Dewhirst to write in early September: Stuart was shot during the seizure, Dewhirst told his Khmer Rouge captors, and either drowned or was abandoned in the water. Dewhirst and Kerry Hamill were dragged off to Democratic Kampuchea's preeminent "security office," in Phnom Penh, known at the time as S-21. S-21 would later be called "Tuol Sleng" by Vietnamese forces that overthrew the Khmer Rouge in January 1979. Like the six other Western yachtsmen imprisoned at S-21 (four Americans and two Australians), Hamill and Dewhirst were forced to confess, presumably under torture, that they were CIA spies. They are believed to have been killed shortly after signing their final "confessions," in mid-October 1978.

== Aftermath of Foxy Lady's seizure ==
The death of six American and two Australian yachtsmen at the hands of the Khmer Rouge was reported for the first time in a wave of wire service dispatches between mid-November and late December 1979—a year after the capture of the last pair of yachtsmen (Australians David Lloyd Scott and Ronald Keith Dean), and fifteen months after the seizure of Foxy Lady. That one of these ill-fated sailors was a Canadian was reported for the first time (no name given) in the edition of 5 December 1979 of the Wellington Evening Post. Glass would be identified by name for the first time in early January 1980, in a UPI dispatch by US journalist Jim Laurie. Subsequent feature articles by American journalist Ed Rasen, detailing Foxy Lady's fate, appeared in the UK publication Now! and the Australian Bulletin. Stuart's family never spoke to the media at the time, however, so for the following thirty years Stuart would be known solely by his name and nationality.

== Trial of Khmer Rouge leaders ==
The most directly implicated of surviving Khmer Rouge chiefs alleged to have played a role in Stuart Glass' death is widely believed to be one of two unnamed individuals of interest in Case 003 of the Extraordinary Chambers in the Courts of Cambodia, the Khmer Rouge Tribunal. (ECCC Case 001 ended in July 2010 with the conviction of S-21 chief Kaing Guek Eav, alias Duch; Case 002 went to trial in the fall of 2011). Meas Mut, a retired Revolutionary Army of Kampuchea chief and self-professed Buddhist, was "Secretary"/"Chairman" of the RAK's Division 164—the Khmer Rouge navy—which seized Stuart Glass and the eight other Western yachtsmen—killing Glass and sending the others to S-21, where forced "confessions" of CIA allegiance were extracted and the young sailors were killed.

Throughout the spring and summer of 2011, various chambers and offices of the ECCC discussed among themselves—acrimoniously, at times—whether Case 003 should continue to be investigated. The court's British Co-Prosecutor, Andrew Cayley, believes Case 003 has been inadequately investigated. Cayley's Cambodian colleague disagrees, in concordance with the Cambodian government's line. Cambodian Prime Minister Hun Sen—a former mid-ranking Khmer Rouge commander himself—has made his view clear that the tribunal should wrap up its work, and certainly not extend charges to anyone other than Case 002 defendants Nuon Chea, Ieng Sary, Ieng Thirith, and Khieu Samphan. The tribunal has yet to decide whether Case 003 will move to trial or not.

The trial of Stuart Glass's alleged murderers began (Nuon Chea and Ieng Sary were in charge of Democratic Kampuchea's internal security apparatus and foreign affairs, respectively), thirty-three years after the Canadian's death. On 7 August 2014 both defendants were found guilty of crimes against humanity and sentenced to life imprisonment.

== See also ==
- Tuol Sleng
- Torture
- Malcolm Caldwell
- Mayaguez Incident
- Vann Nath
- Chum Mey
- Sean Flynn
- Dana Stone
- François Bizot
