= Vann Nath paintings =

Series of paintings depicting torture at S-21 prison

The Vann Nath Paintings are a series of paintings to commemorate the Cambodian genocide and the S-21 prison by Vann Nath that are displayed in the prison, now a museum for the genocide. They depict the many scenes of torture that occurred in the prison under the Khmer Rouge regime witnessed by the painter Vann Nath. Vann Nath painted the series "so history wouldn't repeat itself."
