= Prison 21 =

Prison 21 may refer to:

- Cárcel la 21 in León, Nicaragua
- Security Prison 21, now the Tuol Sleng Genocide Museum in Phnom Penh
