= Koh Tang =

Cambodian island in the Gulf of Thailand

Native name: កោះតាង
- Location within Cambodia

Geography
- Location: Cambodia - Southeast Asia
- Coordinates: 10°18′N 103°7′E
- Area: 5.9 km^{2} (2.3 sq mi)
- Length: 6.4 km (3.98 mi)
- Width: 0.1–3.2 km (0.062–1.988 mi)
- Coastline: 20 km (12 mi)

Administration
- Cambodia
- Province: Sihanoukville
- Municipality: Sihanoukville

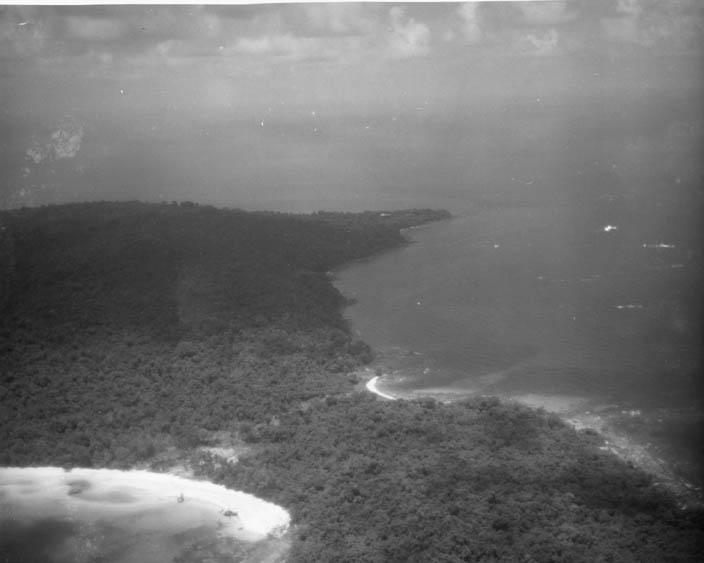
Aerial view of Koh Tang in May 1975

Koh Tang (Khmer: កោះតាង), also known as Tang Island, is the biggest of a group of Cambodian islands off the coast of Sihanoukville Province in the Gulf of Thailand. The island is situated approximately 52 km (32 mi) off the southwest coast of Cambodia. There are no permanent civilian inhabitants living on the island. The Cambodian military maintain a base with a sizable number of personnel.

The Khmer word Koh (កោះ), means 'island', Tang can be loosely translated to "legend".

== Geography ==
The island is rock fringed with its highest point at its northern extremity. Two shallow coves press into the eastern and western neck of its northern plateau. The eastern cove has a long shallow coral sand beach. The small islet Koh Mul/Tuich lies about 1.3 km (1 mi) to the East and Koh Domloung (potato) island about 2.2 km (1 mi) to the South. The islets Koh Tee Mui (8.4 km (5 mi) off) and Koh Tee Bpi (9.6 km (6 mi) off) complete the Koh Tang archipelago.

=== Important Bird Area ===
The archipelago has been designated an Important Bird Area (IBA) by BirdLife International because it supports populations of Christmas Island frigatebirds and Nicobar pigeons.

== History ==
=== Koh Tang massacre ===
In May 1975, Khmer Rouge troops landed on nearby Thổ Chu Island and kidnapped 513 Vietnamese civilians (almost the entire population of Thổ Chu) to Koh Tang, where they were forced to do hard labor until they were all executed.

=== Mayaguez Incident ===
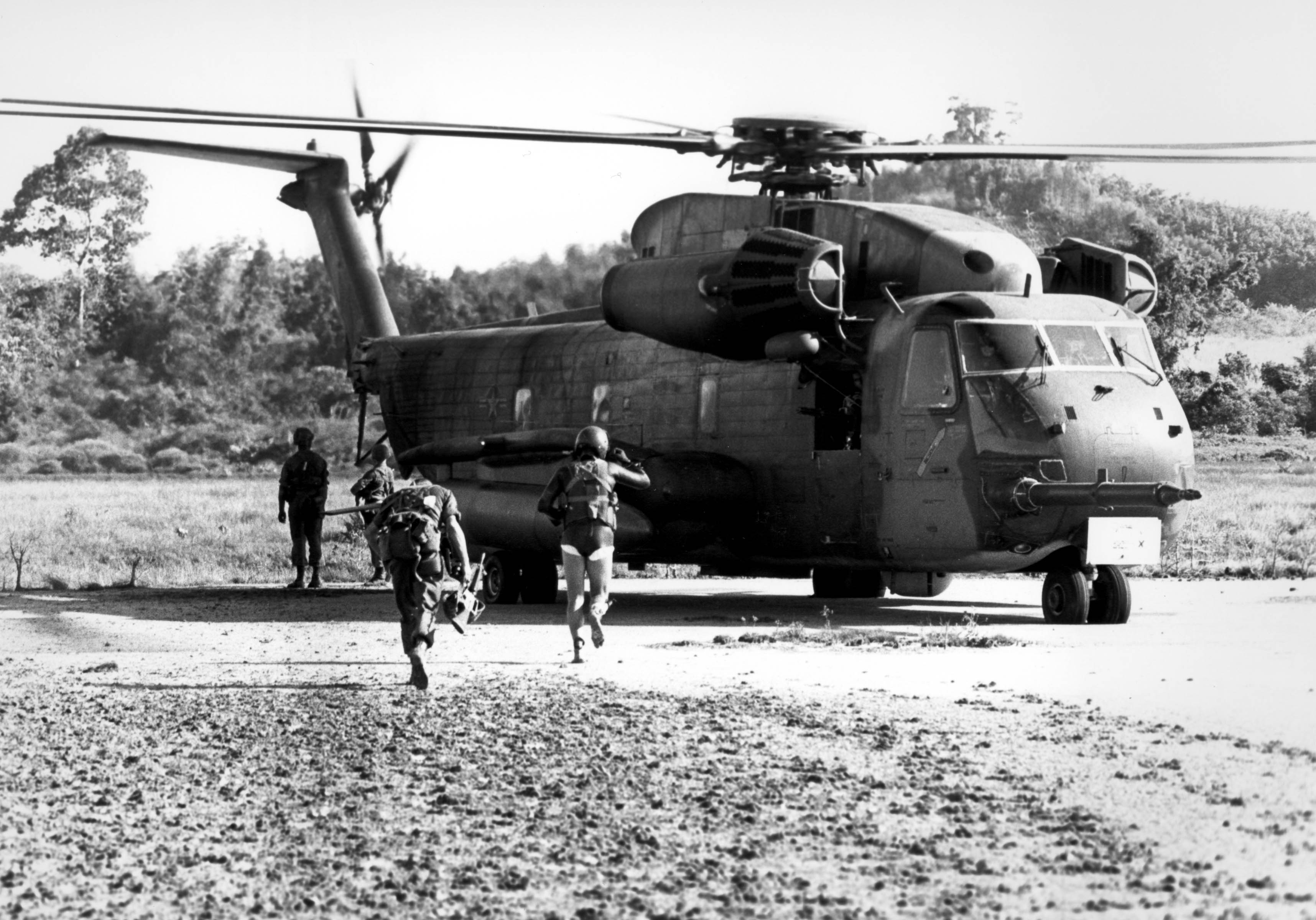
Assault on Koh Tang during the rescue of the SS Mayaguez

The island is the site of the last combat action of the Vietnam War and the only ground combat between U.S. forces and the Khmer Rouge. On May 15, 1975, U.S. Marines on board U.S. Air Force helicopters landed on Koh Tang in the hope of freeing the crew of the SS Mayagüez which had been captured by Khmer Rouge gunboats on May 12, 1975. The crew of the Mayaguez was not on Koh Tang, but had been taken to the Cambodian mainland and were released during the rescue operation. In the course of the operation the Khmer Rouge shot down three CH-53 helicopters on or near Koh Tang and 15 Marines and Air Force crewmen were killed and another three Marines were inadvertently left behind and later executed. An estimated 13-25 Khmer Rouge were killed during the battle.

=== Capture of the Foxy Lady ===
On the evening of August 13, 1978 the Foxy Lady, a Chinese sailing junk which had been blown off course while sailing from Singapore to Bangkok, was discovered taking shelter on the western side of Koh Tang by Khmer Rouge gunboats. The gunboats fired on the Foxy Lady killing Canadian crewman Stuart Glass. The other two crewmen, Englishman John Dewhirst and New Zealander Kerry Hamill dived into the water and were picked up by the Khmer Rouge boats. Dewhirst and Hamill were later transported to S-21 prison in Phnom Penh where they were tortured and forced to write confessions. Dewhirst was executed in late August and Hamill was executed in October 1978.

== See also ==
- List of islands of Cambodia
- Koh Rong Sanloem
- Koh Rong
- Sihanoukville
- Mayaguez Incident
