= Bou Meng =

Survivor of the Tuol Sleng prison camp born (1941–2026)

- ប៊ូ ម៉េង
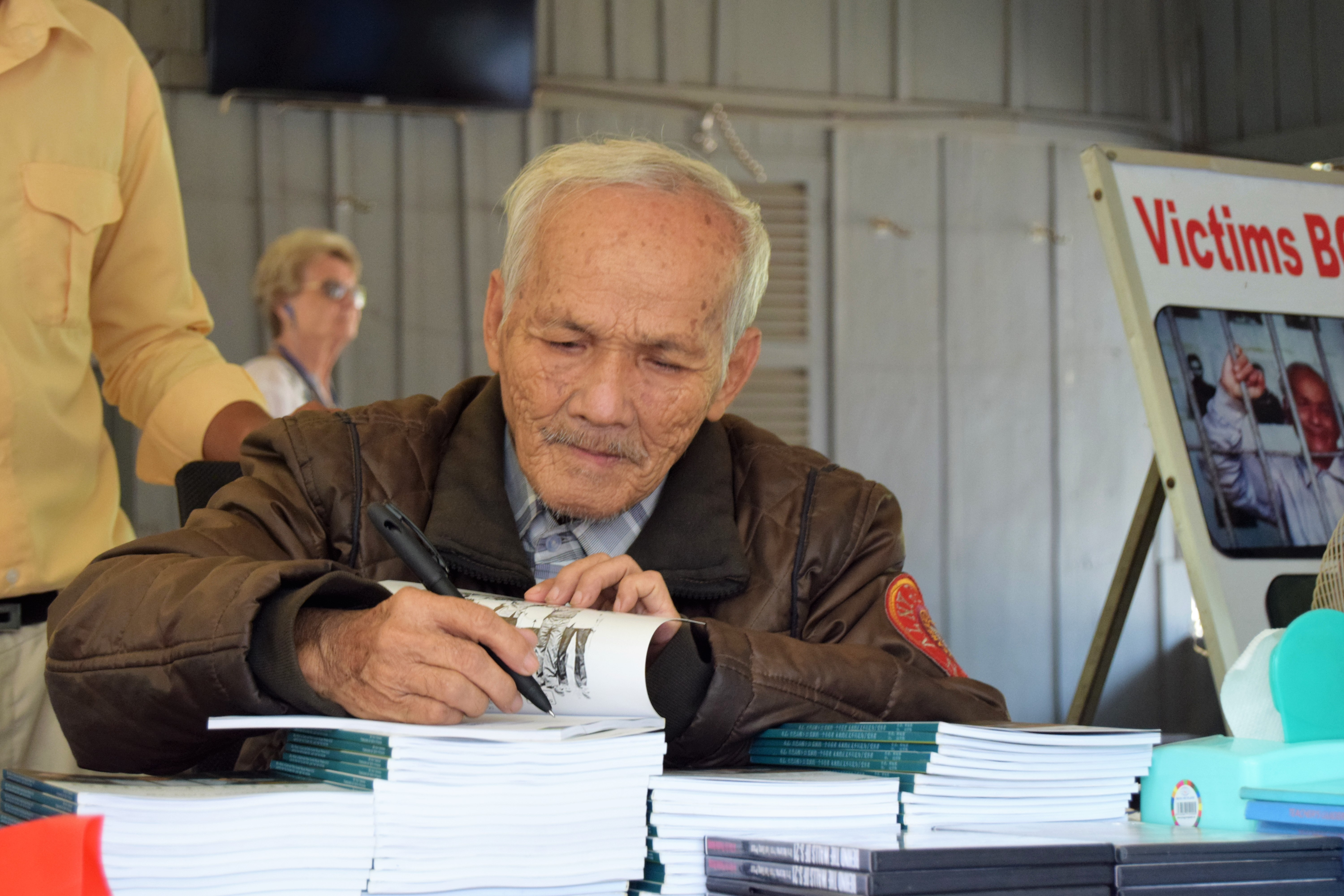
- Bou Meng in 2018
- Born: 4 April 1941; Kampong Cham province, Cambodia, French Indochina
- Died: 14 August 2026 (aged 85); Thommeak Trai, Kandal province, Cambodia
- Occupation: Artist
- Known for: Survivor of the Tuol Sleng prison camp
- Spouse: Ma Yoeun (m. 1965; died 1977)
- Parents: Bou Hak (father); Lay Kat (mother)

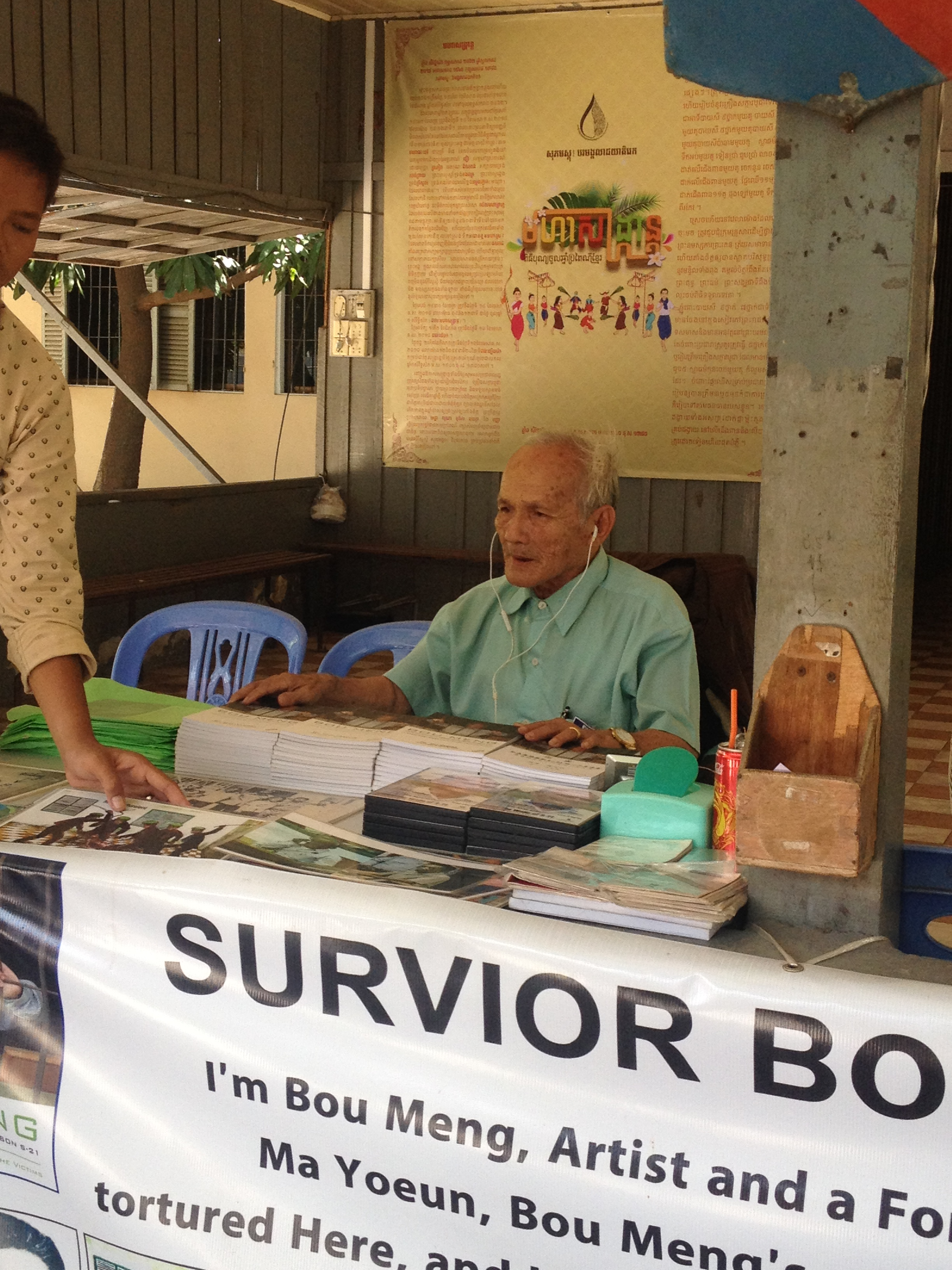
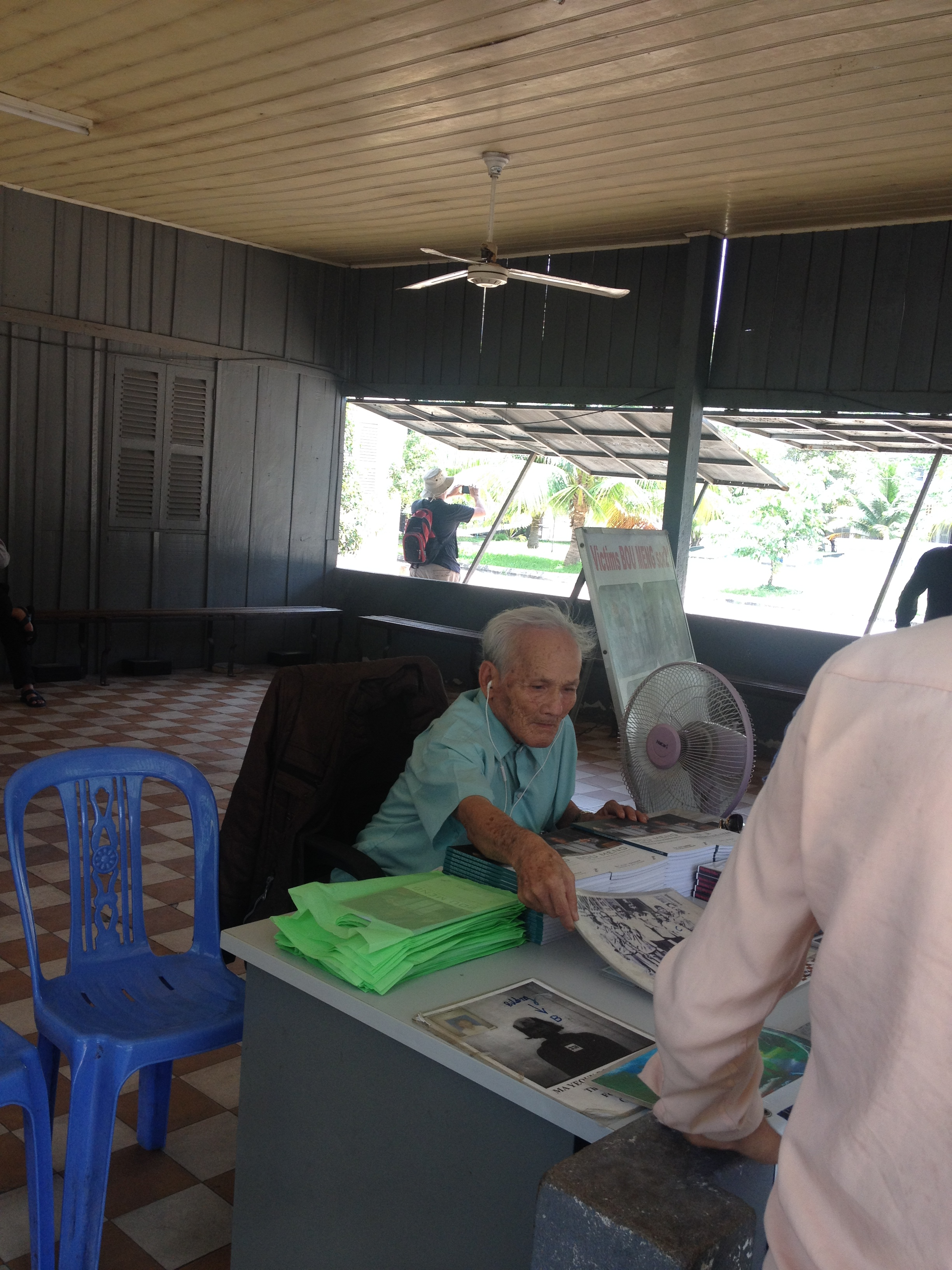
Bou Meng presenting the book about himself (written by Huy Vannak) and the DVD inside Tuol Sleng Genocide Museum, 26 April 2018

Bou Meng (Khmer: ប៊ូ ម៉េង, romanized: Bu Méng [ɓuː meːŋ]; 4 April 1941 – 14 August 2026) was a Cambodian artist, writer, Cambodian genocide survivor, and former revolutionary who was one of only seven known adult survivors of the Khmer Rouge imprisonment in the S-21 Tuol Sleng camp, where 20,000 Cambodians were tortured and executed. He was arrested with his wife, Ma Yoeun, in 1976 and taken into S-21; they never met again after then. Bou Meng was tortured for weeks, with many kinds of torture devices (electric shock, bamboo sticks, whips, rattans, cart axles, etc.) and he had to fabricate confessions. He was spared from being slaughtered only because he was a highly skilled painter. His wife, according to the records of Tuol Sleng, was tortured and killed on August 16, 1977. His children ended up in a children's center, where they eventually starved to death.

In 2002, he was believed to be dead. In January 2002, Cambodian newspaper The Phnom Penh Post wrote that he had died in the 1990s, while Cambodian magazine Searching for the truth wrote that he had "disappeared". When Bou Meng found out that people thought that he was dead, he went back to S-21 (which had been converted into a museum).

== Early life and education ==
Bou Meng was born into a peasant family in Kampong Cham province, Cambodia, on 4 April 1941. His father's name was Bou Hak, while his mother's name was Lay Kat; the family lived along the Mekong River, close to Kampong Cham. While his family was poor, his living conditions were typical of many Cambodian families then. At the time, Cambodia was under the French protectorate and the French had imposed heavy taxes on Cambodians; this, combined with lack of land to farm, commonly worsened the living conditions of many Cambodian families. Another problem was the lack of hospitals in the region where Bou Meng lived. If somebody got sick, they had to be taken to the district hospital.

Bou Meng studied at Kor wat with the monks since there were very few schools and teachers. Therein the monks taught him Khmer literature and mathematics. In the same wat, he became increasingly interested in painting.

In 1956, at the age of 15, Bou Meng became a monk. At that time, virtually every Cambodian family had at least a son who had become a monk, and it was a bad thing to not have a monk in one's family. In the meanwhile, he also used to visit a painting shop (named "Special Painting House") where he enjoyed seeing how pictures were made and, in the same shop, he met a few painters. A Chinese painter taught him to draw black and white pictures with a black powder made from petroleum, while another painter who had studied at the Fine Arts University in Phnom Penh taught him to paint "all kinds of pictures".

In 1963, Bou Meng returned to his hometown in Kampong Cham, where he started to work for cinema theaters as a painter. His job was to paint the pictures for each movie. It soon earned him a good living, and he married Ma Yoeun in 1965. In 1968 he also ran a small painting shop in Chamkar Leu district of Kampong Cham province.

== Joining the revolution ==
On 18 March 1970 Prince Sihanouk was dethroned by a coup d'état and Lon Nol took power over Cambodia. Cities and urban areas were controlled by the Khmer Republic dominated by Lon Nol, while the remaining areas were under the control of the Khmer Rouge.

Shortly thereafter, an old friend of Bou Meng whose name was Nai and a man whose name was Chhon asked him to join the Khmer Rouge revolution. Nai explained that it was about liberating both the country and Prince Sihanouk. Bou Meng was still unsure about what to do, but one day he heard on the radio Prince Sihanouk speaking from Beijing and appealing to the people to join the revolution. After hearing this, Bou Meng no longer hesitated to join the revolution and, in June 1971, he left his village with his wife and went to the jungle in order to help the revolutionaries. Bou Meng joined the revolution mainly because he wanted Prince Sihanouk to return to power.

On 17 April 1975 the Khmer Rouge successfully managed to take control of Phnom Penh and the whole country, and everybody celebrated inside the compound where Bou Meng was working. Shortly thereafter, they were told to travel to Phnom Penh and, on their way, they saw many city dwellers heading towards the opposite direction. Many were sad and some children were crying because they could not find their parents. Bou Meng "felt strange about these scenes" and since then he started to realize that he had been cheated by the revolution.

== Work in Phnom Penh and captivity in S-21 ==
Every night I looked out at the moon. I heard people crying and sighing around the building.
I heard people calling out, 'Mother, help me! Mother, help me!' — Bou Meng, Huy Vannak - Bou Meng (2010)

Once in Phnom Penh, Bou Meng was assigned to work inside the State Commercial Office, while his wife Ma Yoeun was assigned to work at a hospital. In 1976, he and his wife were assigned to work at another place, i.e. Rassey Keo Technical School, while their children were sent to a children's center.

Not long thereafter, Bou Meng and his wife were sent to the Ta-Lei cooperative, an agricultural working site where he had to work very hard "from dawn to dusk". There was not enough food and he was losing weight day by day. He also found out that Ta-Lei cooperative was a sort of detention center and this shocked him. They could not understand what mistake they had made. He also noticed that people at Ta-Lei gradually disappeared and new people arrived every day. On 16 August 1977 two youths told Bou Meng that he was assigned to teach at the Fine Arts School of Phnom Penh and he was very happy about this, since he did not have to work in that cooperative anymore. But after they departed, they noticed that it was not the right way to the Fine Arts School. They had been taken to a detention center, a building surrounded by barbed wire (S-21). Bou Meng told them that they had done nothing wrong, but the guard screamed at them that Angkar never makes mistakes. Bou Meng described S-21 as "a hell on earth" (norauk lok kei).

== Torture ==
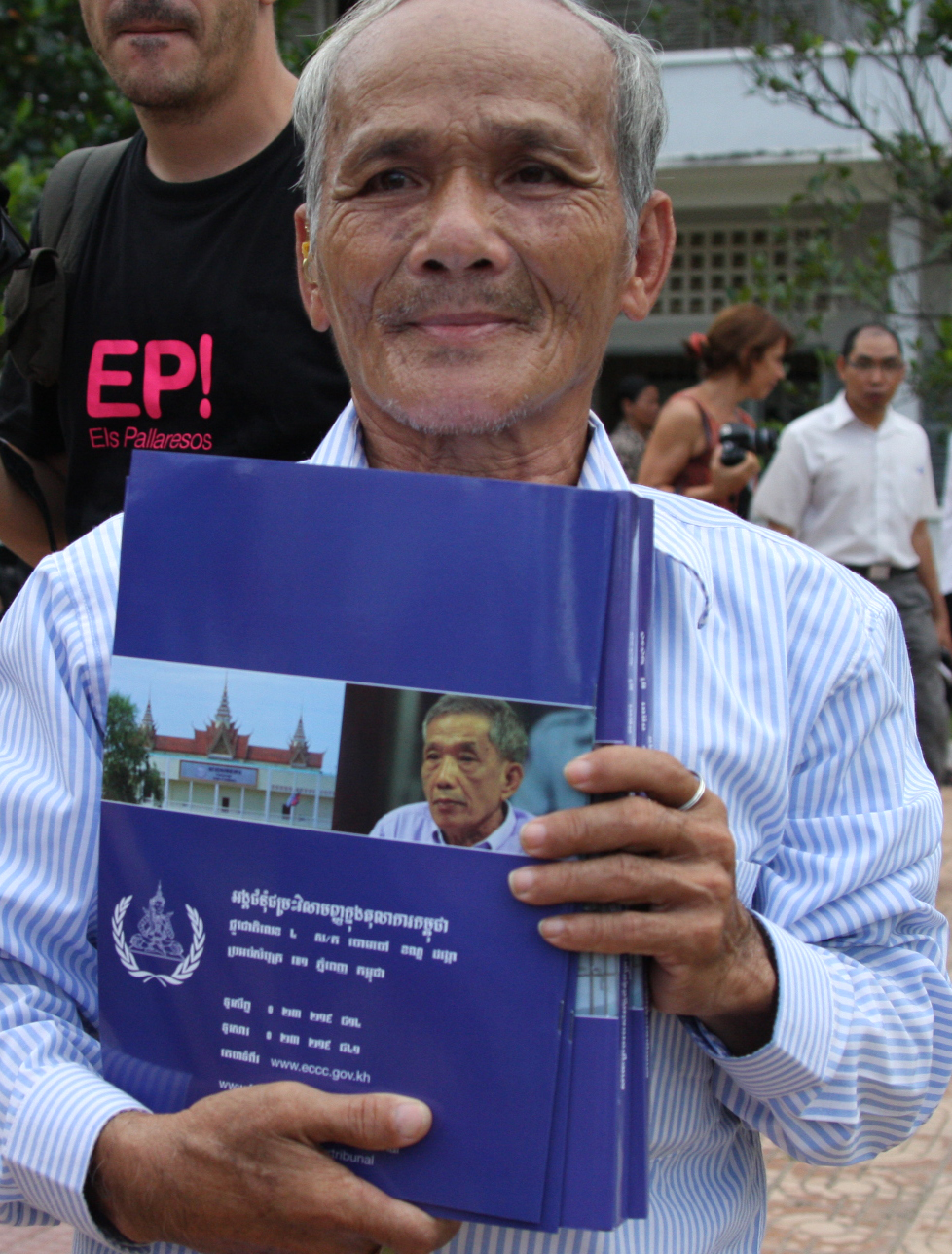
Bou Meng holding a copy of the Duch verdict

Bou Meng was interrogated and tortured for weeks with methods like electric shocks, bamboo sticks and whips. Bou Meng once recalled that "they tortured me like an animal" and "my life was so miserable". Bou Meng always answered that he was innocent and that he had done nothing wrong, but the guards kept torturing him and asking him where he had met the CIA, KGB and "Yuon land swallowers", despite him not even knowing what they were. He finally fabricated confessions, hoping that they would stop torturing him. He said that he had joined the CIA at the pagoda with the monks and that he was asked to join the CIA by a pagoda boy. The guards also asked him about the CIA networks in the jungle, and he had to provide the names of 20 people he had met in that period.

== Painting propaganda pictures inside S-21 ==
A few weeks after his interrogation started, two youths visited the cells in order to find prisoners who could paint portraits and pictures. Bou Meng told them that he could do the job. But they also warned him that he would be killed if the picture was not lifelike.

Then, Bou Meng was taken to the health clinic of the prison in order to heal his wounds, and he met Comrade Duch, the chief of S-21. His treatment completely changed after being appointed as painter. He had to paint portraits of Pol Pot, Karl Marx, and other propaganda pictures. He said: "Because of my painting skills, I was now treated less harshly". He was also in touch with other prisoners who had been granted special treatment because of their skills, and one of those was Vann Nath.

== Escape from S-21 ==
The Vietnamese were getting closer and closer and, on 7 January 1979 Bou Meng and others were told to line up and they were walked to the exit gate of S-21. Bou Meng was scared, as he thought that his last day had come. They had to walk westward without being given food or water. They also passed Choeung Ek (the Killing Fields area) where they smelled a "stench of something like dead animals on the night breeze". At a certain point, they heard the tanks of the Vietnamese army getting closer and closer and four guards fled. The prisoners also managed to flee and, among those, also Bou Meng, who escaped northward with a friend. On their way, Bou Meng saw a lot of murdered people. They often found corpses lying dead and they took clothes from one of those, eating whatever they could find, such as fruit, roots and so on.

In 1981, Ung Pech, an ex-prisoner of S-21 (and one of only seven known adult survivors) who had become director of the museum, asked Bou Meng to come back to S-21. Bou Meng had never thought about coming back, but he saw it as an opportunity to recount the pain and fear he had suffered, and let both Cambodians and the whole world know about his experiences.

Bou Meng died in the village of Thommeak Trai in Kandal province, on 14 August 2026, at the age of 85.

== See also ==
- Cambodian genocide
- Cambodian genocide denial
- Democratic Kampuchea
- Chum Mey
- John Dawson Dewhirst

== Bibliography ==
- Vannak, Huy (2010). Bou Meng: A Survivor From Khmer Rouge Prison S-21, Justice for the Future Not Just for the Victims. Documentation Center of Cambodia. ISBN 978-9995060190.
