= Mam Nai =

Cambodian war criminal

- Born: 1934 (age 91–92); Kampong Thom, Cambodia, French Indochina
- Other names: Comrade Chan, Ta Chan
- Occupation: Lieutenant of the Khmer Rouge security branch
- Years active: 1975–1996
- Political party: Communist Party of Kampuchea

Mam Nai or Mam Nay (Khmer: ម៉មណៃ, born 1934), nom de guerre Comrade Chan (សមមិត្តច័ន្ទ), is a Cambodian war criminal and former lieutenant of Santebal, the internal security branch of the Khmer Rouge communist movement, which ruled Democratic Kampuchea from 1975 to 1979. He was the leader of the interrogation unit at Tuol Sleng (S-21), assisting Kang Kek Iew (Comrade Duch), the head of the camp where thousands were held for interrogation, torture and subsequent killing.

Mam Nai gave testimony at the Extraordinary Chambers in the Courts of Cambodia on 14 July 2009. He denied being a leader of the interrogation and torture system of the Khmer Rouge.

Tall, pock-marked and having a pink complexion, Mam Nai impressed both Nate Thayer and François Bizot as the most frightening Khmer Rouge individual they ever beheld. Bizot further described Mam Nai as a 'true crime fiction character' with a terrifying 'gallows face'. He met him twice at the French Embassy compound in Phnom Penh, the second time during the arrest of Sirik Matak who had been hiding seeking political asylum.

== Biography ==
Mam Nai was born in Kampong Thom Province in 1934, while Cambodia was under French domination. He was taught by Son Sen at the Institut de Pédagogie (Teacher Training College) in Phnom Penh, becoming a natural sciences teacher in 1956, and Kompong Thom's Balaign College principal in 1958. In the school environment he got to know Kang Kek Iew (Duch) who was his deputy principal. Both were arrested by Norodom Sihanouk's security services in 1967 owing to their leftist activities. After being freed from jail by Lon Nol in 1970, Mam Nai joined Duch in the guerrilla zone under the control of the Khmer Rouge. He assisted in the interrogation and torture of prisoners at 'M-13 prison camp', the first prison Duch set up in the forests of Amleang, Thpong District.

Together with Tang Sin Hean (Comrade Pon) Mam Nai helped Duch to perfect his interrogation techniques in order to purge perceived "enemies of the revolution" from the Khmer Rouge ranks. Prisoners at these camps, mostly disgraced Khmer Rouge cadres, were routinely starved and tortured to extract real and made-up confessions. Few prisoners left the camps alive. Following the Khmer Rouge victory in April 1975 Duch and his men set up prisons throughout the capital including the infamous Tuol Sleng prison. By 1978, as the party paranoia of seeking unchallenged authority and the ensuing purges increased towards the end of Pol Pot's rule, more and more people were brought to Tuol Sleng. Mam Nai was fluent in the Vietnamese language, uncommon among Cambodians, and took part in the interrogation and torture of Vietnamese-background prisoners, contributing to the extermination of the Vietnamese Cambodian minority.

Mam Nai's signature is on scores of documents detailing the torture of DK's political opponents. He saw to the execution of surviving prisoners with his boss Duch before abandoning Tuol Sleng prison; both men were among the last Khmer Rouge cadres to flee Phnom Penh when it fell to the People's Army of Vietnam on 7 January 1979. After escaping to the border, Mam Nai joined one of the Khmer Rouge groups that had found sanctuary in Thailand. In the 1990s he was still working as an interrogator for the Khmer Rouge after joining Front 250, commanded by Ny Korn. Mam Nai left the Khmer Rouge shortly before Pol Pot ordered Son Sen's assassination in 1997, living as a private small-scale farmer in the west of the country. Although Cambodian authorities knew where he lived for a long time no attempt was made to arrest him. According to Stephen Heder of London University Mam Nai is implicated in "hands-on torture and execution and would almost certainly be convicted in any international tribunal". After appearing at Duch's trial as a witness Mam Nai has, however, not been charged. At the trial he was asked questions regarding his involvement in the torture and murder of Phung Ton, former dean of Phnom Penh University, but Mam Nai carefully avoided incriminating himself.

== See also ==
- Killing Fields

== Bibliography ==
- Chandler, David: Voices from S-21. Terror and history inside Pol Pot's secret prison. University of California Press, 1999. ISBN 0-520-22247-4 (A general account of S-21 drawing heavily from the documentation maintained by the prison's staff.)
- Stephen Heder with Brian D. Tittemore, Seven Candidates for Prosecution: Accountability for the Crimes of the Khmer Rouge, War Crimes Research Office, Washington College of Law, American University, and Documentation Center of Cambodia. July 2001
