= S-21: The Khmer Rouge Killing Machine =

2003 documentary film directed by Rithy Panh

- DVD cover
- Directed by: Rithy Panh
- Written by: Rithy Panh
- Produced by: Cati Couteau; Dana Hastier; Aline Sasson; Liane Willemont
- Starring: Chum Mey; Vann Nath
- Cinematography: Prum Mesa; Rithy Panh
- Edited by: Isabelle Roudy; Marie-Christine Rougerie
- Music by: Marc Marder
- Distributed by: Institut national de l'audiovisuel First Run Features
- Release date: 17 May 2003 (France)
- Running time: 101 minutes
- Country: Cambodia/France
- Language: Khmer/Vietnamese

S-21: The Khmer Rouge Killing Machine (French: S-21, la machine de mort Khmère rouge) is a 2003 documentary film directed by Rithy Panh. Rithy, himself a survivor of the Khmer Rouge, brought together two former prisoners of the regime with their former captors at Tuol Sleng Genocide Museum, the former Security Prison 21 (S-21) under the Khmer Rouge.

== Synopsis ==
Vann Nath and Chum Mey, two survivors of the Khmer Rouge's Tuol Sleng Prison, are reunited and revisit the former prison, now a museum in Phnom Penh. They meet their former captors – guards, interrogators, a doctor and a photographer – many of whom were barely teenagers during the Khmer Rouge regime of Democratic Kampuchea (DK) era from 1975 to 1979. Their appearances are in stark contrast to the two former prisoners, who are both elderly men. Vann Nath, who was made to paint portraits of prisoners, has a full head of white hair.

The guards and interrogators give a tour of the museum, re-enacting their treatment of the prisoners and daily regimens. They look over the prison's detailed records, including photographs, to refresh their memories.

At one point, Vann Nath directly confronts his former captors about their actions, but they counter that they themselves were also victims, being little more than children at the time, and hold themselves blameless.

== Cast ==
- Khieu 'Poev' Ches (Guard)
- Yeay Cheu (Him Houy's mother)
- Nhiem Ein (Photographer)
- Houy Him (Security deputy)
- Ta Him (Him Houy's Father)
- Nhieb Ho (Guard)
- Prakk Kahn (the Torturer)
- Peng Kry (Driver)
- Som Meth (Guard)
- Chum Mey (Survivor)
- Vann Nath (Survivor)
- Top Pheap (Interrogator & Typist)
- Tcheam Seur (Guard)
- Mak Thim (S21 Doctor)
- Sours Thi (Head of Registers)

== Reception ==
S-21: The Khmer Rouge Killing Machine premiered at the 2003 Cannes Film Festival, where it won the Prix François Chalais. It was also screened at several other film festivals, including the 2003 Toronto International Film Festival (its North American premiere), the New York Film Festival and the Vancouver International Film Festival. It won for best documentary at the Chicago International Film Festival, the European Film Awards and the Valladolid International Film Festival; humanitarian award at the Hong Kong International Film Festival, the FIPRESCI Prize at the Dok Leipzig, a special jury prize at the Copenhagen International Film Festival, and runner-up at the Yamagata International Documentary Film Festival.

In Cambodia, the film was a catalyst for confession about the Cambodian Civil War. Former Khmer Rouge leader Khieu Samphan saw the film and was moved to admit the existence of the prison after years of publicly denying it.

On review aggregator website Rotten Tomatoes, the film holds an approval rating of 94% based on 32 reviews, with an average rating of 8.0/10.
