= Chum Mey =

Survivor of the Tuol Sleng prison camp (born 1931)

- ជុំ ម៉ី
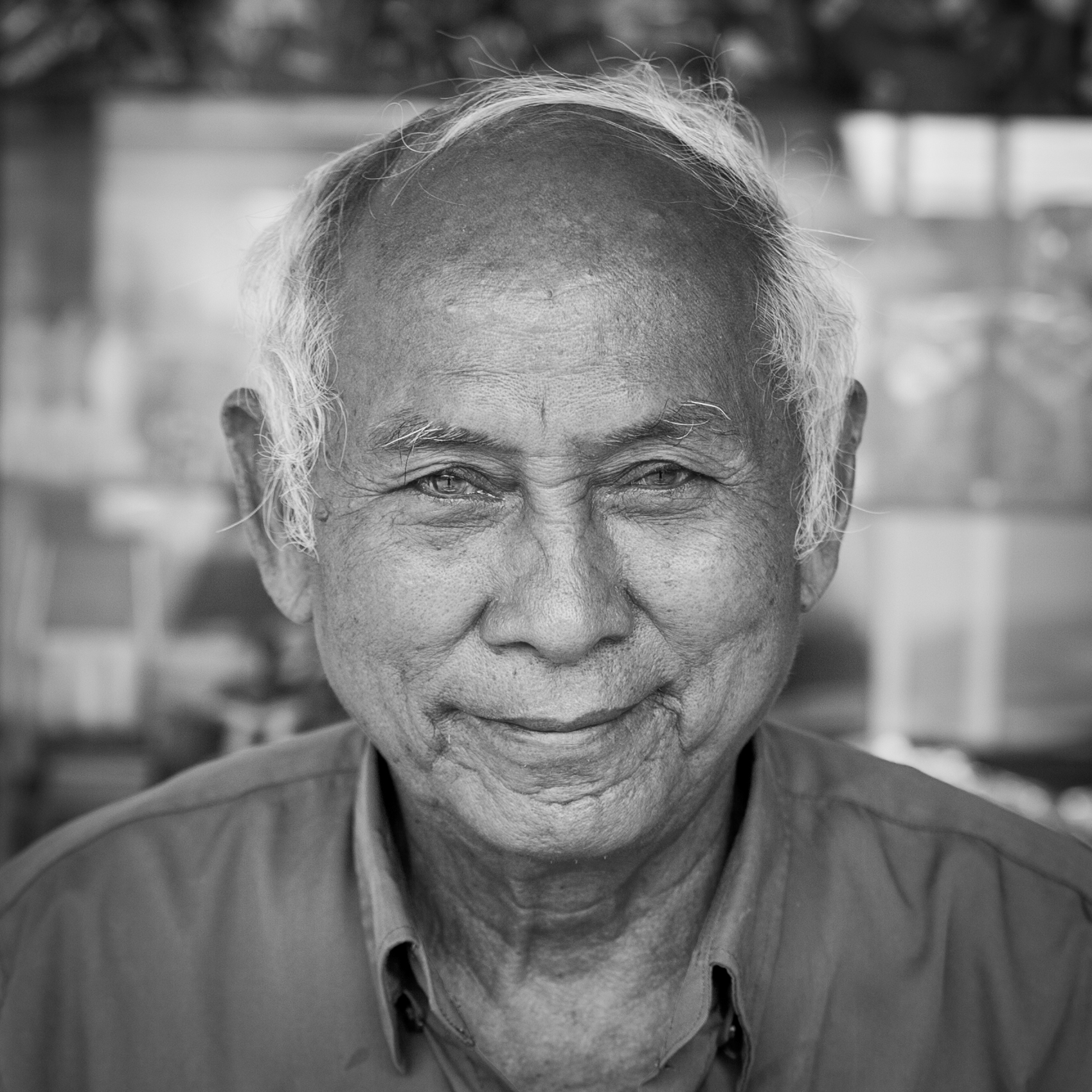
- Chum Mey in 2015
- Born: November, 1931; Cambodia, French Indochina
- Occupations: Motor mechanic, writer
- Known for: Survivor of the Tuol Sleng prison camp
- Children: 7 (4 killed)

Chum Mey (Khmer: ជុំ ម៉ី, romanized: Chŭm Mei [cum məj]; born November, 1931) is a Cambodian man and is one of only seven known adult survivors of the Khmer Rouge imprisonment in the S-21 Tuol Sleng camp, where 20,000 prisoners, mostly Cambodians, were sent for execution. Formerly a motor mechanic working in Phnom Penh, he was taken to the prison on 28 October 1978, accused of being a spy. His life was only spared because of his ability to repair sewing machines. Born in 1930 in Cambodia (which was at the time a part of French Indochina), it’s unclear whether he witnessed war crimes in Indochina committed in World War II and the First Indochina War committed by the Japanese troops and French troops in the 1940’s and 1950’s before the Khmer Rouge took over Cambodia in 1975. In 2004, he described the killing of his wife and son who were killed by the Kampuchea Revolutionary Army and the Santebal:

"First they shot my wife, who was marching in front with the other women," he said. "She screamed to me, 'Please run, they are killing me now'. I heard my son crying and then they fired again, killing him. When I sleep, I still see their faces, and every day I still think of them".

Chum Mey later remarried and had six children; three sons and three daughters.

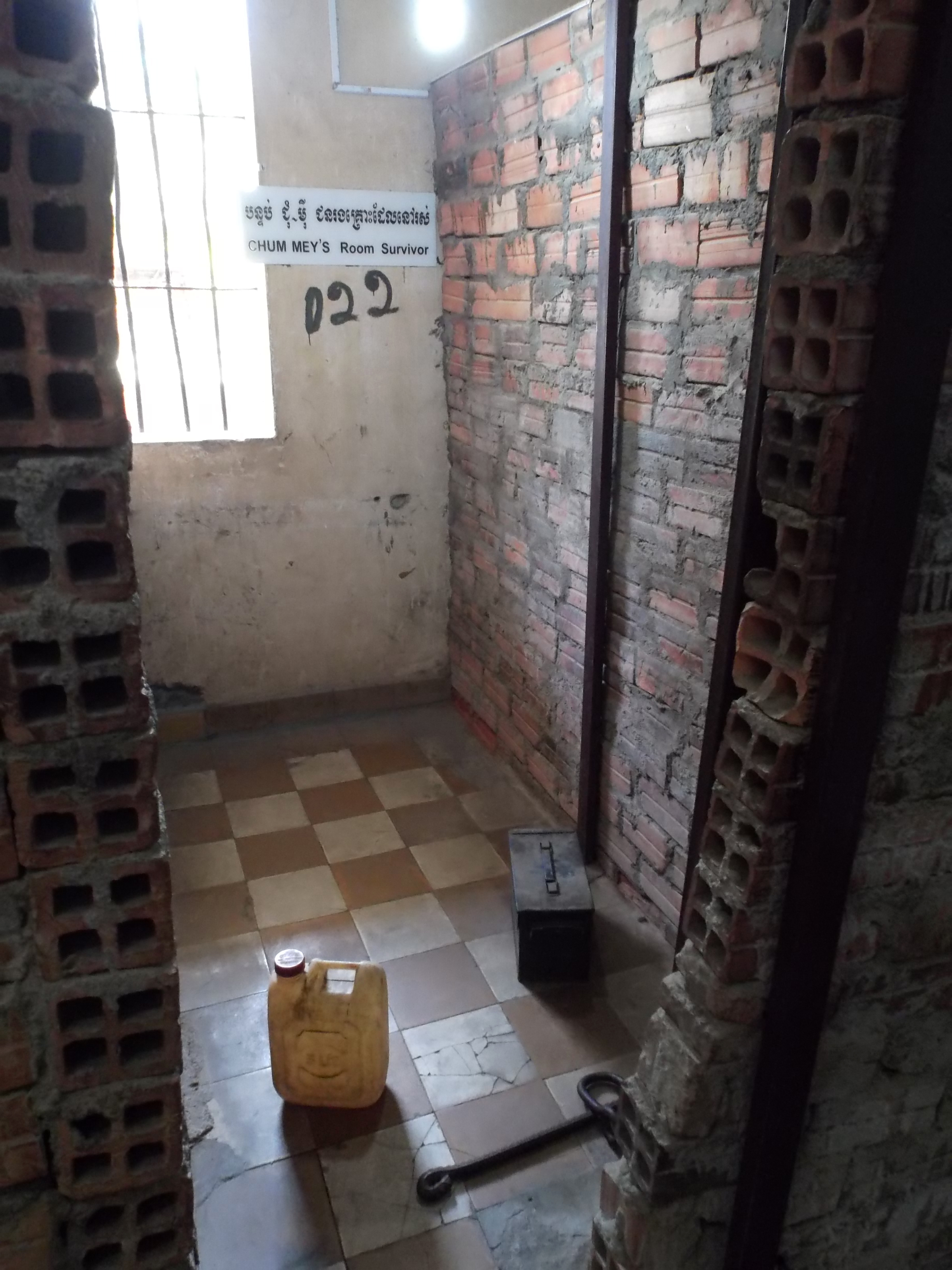
Mey's cell at S-21

In 2003, he appeared in the Rithy Panh documentary S-21: The Khmer Rouge Killing Machine along with Cambodian artist Vann Nath where they were reunited and revisited the former prison, now known as the Tuol Sleng Genocide Museum in Phnom Penh. They met their former captors – guards, interrogators, a doctor and a photographer – many of whom were barely teenagers during the Khmer Rouge era from 1975 to 1979. Their appearances are in stark contrast to the two former prisoners, who were older during imprisonment and by the time of filming were both elderly men. Vann Nath, who was made to paint portraits of prisoners, had a full head of white hair. The guards and interrogators gave a tour of the museum, re-enacting their treatment of the prisoners and daily regimens. They looked over the prison's detailed records, including photographs, to refresh their memories.

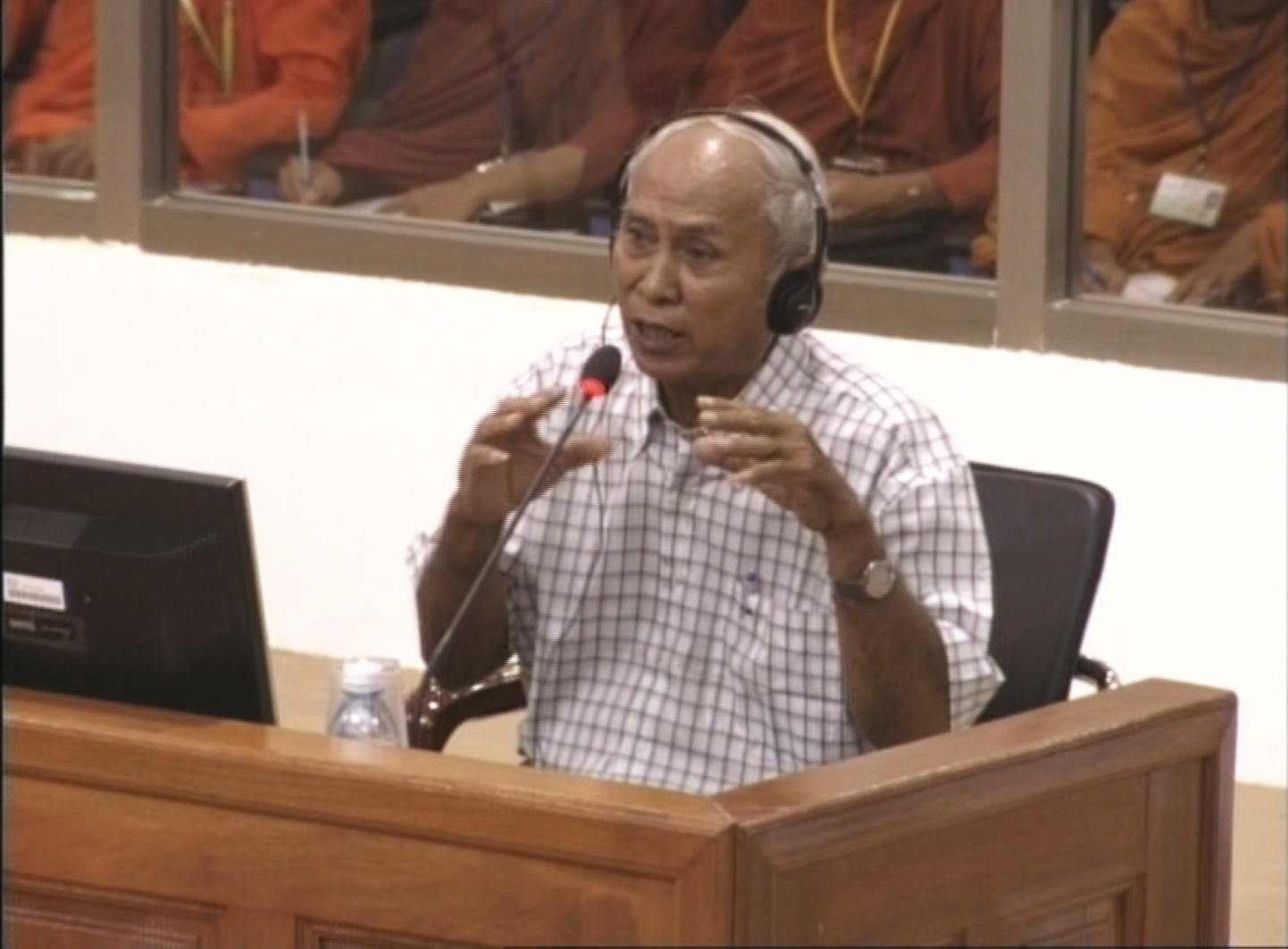
Chum Mey giving evidence at the Khmer Rouge Tribunal, 30 June 2009

In 2009, he gave evidence at the Khmer Rouge Tribunal, the trial of surviving leaders of the Khmer Rouge regime. At the trial, he stated that "I cry every night. Every time I hear people talk about the Khmer Rouge it reminds me of my wife and children". He also expressed a desire for former leader Kang Kek Iew to receive life imprisonment, which he did in 2012.

On 9 November 2014, Mey appeared on BBC's The Mekong River with Sue Perkins.

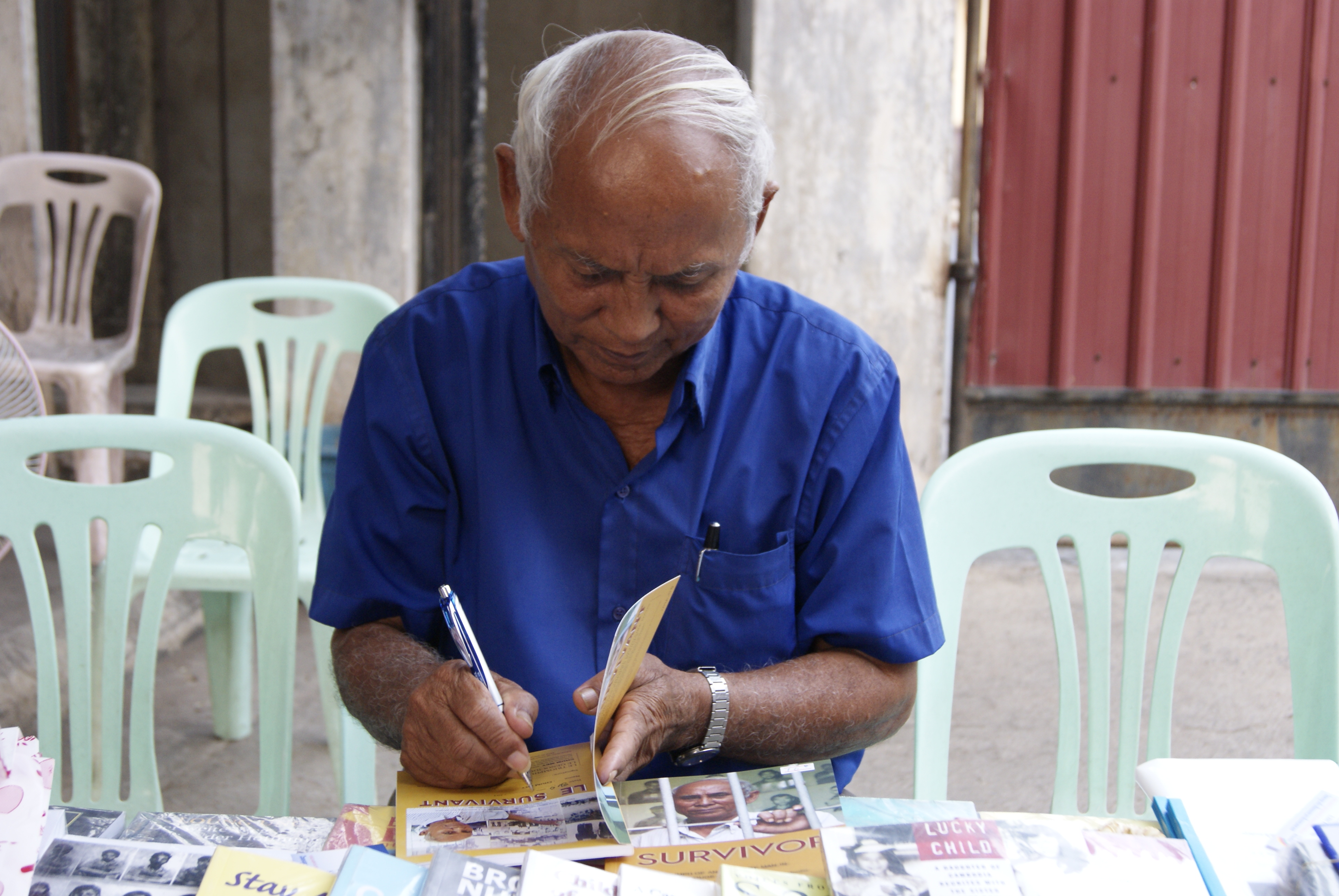
Chum Mey signing his book Survivor: The Triumph of an Ordinary Man in the Khmer Rouge Genocide for visitors to the Tuol Sleng Genocide Museum in Phnom Penh (March 2015)

== See also ==
- Vann Nath
- John Dawson Dewhirst
- Comrade Duch
- Bou Meng
