= John Dawson Dewhirst =

Executed British adventurer

- Born: 1952; Jesmond, Newcastle Upon Tyne, United Kingdom
- Died: c. August 1978 (aged 26); Democratic Kampuchea
- Cause of death: Execution
- Occupation: English teacher

John Dawson Dewhirst (1952 – c. August 1978) was a British teacher and amateur yachtsman who was one of nine westerners, and two Britons, known to have been killed by the Khmer Rouge during the rule of Pol Pot.

== Early life ==
Dewhirst was born in the Jesmond district of Newcastle upon Tyne in 1952. His father was a headmaster, and his mother ran an antiques shop. In 1963, at age 11, the Dewhirst family moved to Cumbria. While growing up in Cumbria, Dewhirst became a sports enthusiast, and took a liking to outdoor activities. He spent most of his boyhood roaming the Cumbrian countryside.

At Appleby Grammar School, Dewhirst developed a love for poetry and aspired to be a novelist. After finishing his A Levels, he won an English scholarship to study at Loughborough University. While studying at Loughborough University, he trained as a teacher. After receiving his degree in teaching, his desire for adventure and to become a writer led him to travel to Tokyo, Japan to teach English in 1977. Dewhirst also worked for The Japan Times from June 1977 to January 1978.

== Disappearance ==
Some time in July 1978, while visiting a friend in the eastern Malaysian town of Kuala Terengganu, and en route from Japan back to England, Dewhirst met Canadian Stuart Glass and New Zealander Kerry Hamill, co-owners of a little Malaysian bedar named Foxy Lady. The three spent several weeks or a month together in Kuala Terengganu, and then headed north to Bangkok. For reasons that are unclear, Foxy Lady ended up in Cambodian waters and was seized, off Koh Tang, by a patrol vessel attached to Division 164 of the Revolutionary Army of Kampuchea. Foxy Lady may have been on its way to Bangkok to pick up a load of Thai sticks. Glass had engaged in hashish smuggling before. Dewhirst's history in this area is unknown. His Kuala Terengganu friend has recalled Dewhirst speaking of planned adventures. Glass was shot and killed, or drowned, during the seizure. Dewhirst and Hamill may have been held for several days on a nearby island, and were then taken to the interrogation centre of S-21.

== S-21 records ==
In early 1979, Vietnam defeated Democratic Kampuchea and overthrew the Pol Pot regime. They liberated Democratic Kampuchea's S-21 prison in the capital Phnom Penh where an estimated 20,000 people (the real number is unknown) had been sent for torture and execution (or taken to the Killing Fields for execution after being tortured), many of them for supposedly spying against Cambodia. Alleged photographs and forced confessions of nine missing Western yachtsmen (four Americans, two Australians, plus those of John Dewhirst and Kerry Hamill) were found in the prison files. The confessions of Dewhirst and Hamill revealed that they had been seized by a Khmer Rouge patrol vessel near the island of Koh Tang on the evening of 13 August 1978. Stuart Glass, the Canadian befriended by Dewhirst and Hamill, had been shot and killed during Foxy Lady's capture. Hamill and Dewhirst were both brought ashore and then taken by truck to Phnom Penh. Like the other Western yachtsmen, they were almost certainly tortured. The extent of their mistreatment is not clear. Dewhirst wrote several long confessions that mixed true events in his life with false accounts of his career as a CIA agent planning to subvert the Khmer Rouge regime. He claimed that his father (also an agent) had been paid a large bribe for inducting his son into the CIA and that his college course in Loughborough was interspersed with training as a spy. Dewhirst and Hamill signed a series of confessions between 3 September and 13 October 1978.

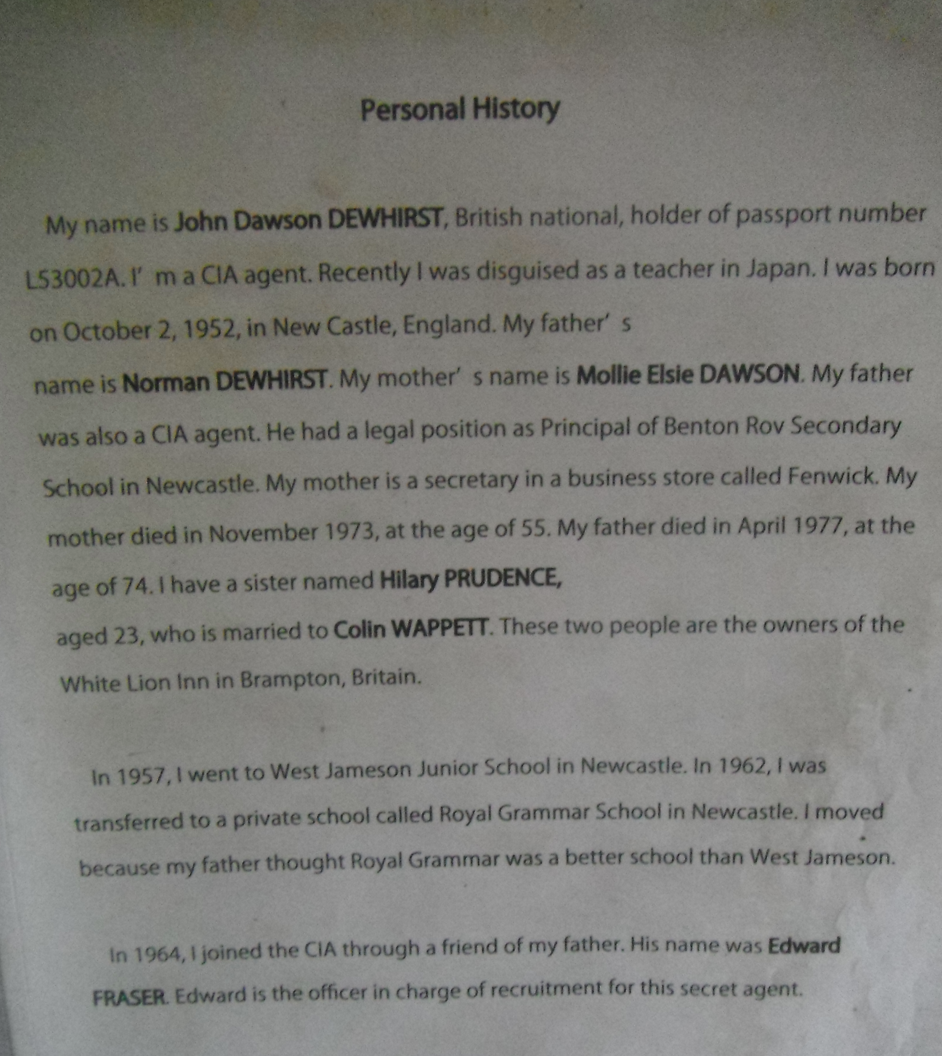
John Dawson Dewhirst's first page of a forced confession when being tortured by the Cambodian Pol Pot Regime in the S-21 prison in Phnom Penh.

The former administrator of the prison, Kang Kek Iew (also known as "Comrade Duch"), said that he remembered Dewhirst as "very polite".

== News of his death ==
The circumstances of the deaths of Dewhirst and Hamill remain unclear. Their deaths were first reported in late 1979 and early 1980 by ABC News journalist Jim Laurie and freelance photographer Edward Rasen. Rasen provided more details, including photographs and portions of confessions in stories for the UK publication NOW! and the Australian Bulletin.

During the 2009 trial of S-21 chief Kang Kek Iew, a former S-21 guard named Cheam Sour claimed that one of the eight Western yachtsmen held at S-21 was burned to death. Sensational reports that this individual was Dewhirst are unsubstantiated. Like other S-21 inmates, Dewhirst may well have been killed with a blow to the head. Kang Kek Iew said that he received orders from his superiors that the bodies of the murdered westerners had to be burned to remove all traces of their remains, adding, "I believe that nobody would dare to violate my orders".

== Aftermath ==
On 10 November 2005, in an interview, Dewhirst's sister, Hillary Dewhirst-Holland told interviewers that she wanted her brother's case to be detailed in the prosecution indictment against Kang Kek Iew.

During Kang Kek Iew's trial beginning in 2007, Hillary did not attend the trial to testify against Kang Kek Iew. Instead, she handed a note to Rob Hamill, younger brother of Kerry Hamill, to share with the court.

On 27 August 2009, Rob Hamill appeared before the Extraordinary Chambers in the Courts of Cambodia (ECCC) as a civil party in Case 001, against Kang Kek Iew. In April 2011, Hamill applied to the ECCC once more for civil party status in ECCC Case 003, believed to involve former Khmer Rouge chief Meas Mut. As "Secretary" of Democratic Kampuchea's Division 164, comprising the country's navy, Mut would have been responsible for the gunning down of Stuart Glass and the seizure of Foxy Lady's two other crew, Kerry Hamill and John Dewhirst, as well as the arrest of the other six Western yachtsmen.

== See also ==
- Chum Mey
- Dana Stone
- François Bizot
- List of kidnappings
- List of solved missing person cases
- Malcolm Caldwell
- Mayaguez Incident
- Sean Flynn
- Vann Nath
