= Santebal =

Secret police of the Khmer Rouge

- សន្តិបាល

Agency overview
- Formed: Early 1971
- Dissolved: 7 January 1979
- Type: Secret police
- Jurisdiction: Democratic Kampuchea
- Headquarters: Security Prison 21, Phnom Penh
- Minister responsible: Son Sen, Deputy Defense Minister
- Agency executive: Comrade Duch, Security Apparatus
- Parent agency: Khmer Rouge

The Santebal (Khmer: សន្តិបាល, lit. 'Keeper of Peace') was the secret police and security apparatus of the Khmer Rouge in Democratic Kampuchea. It was an integral part of the structure of the government, the Communist Party of Kampuchea (CPK), and served the party—referred to as "Angkar"- by purging "traitorous" elements, which meant anyone, including all foreigners (Westerners), suspected of opposing the party, including intellectuals and ethnic minorities (such as the Vietnamese). The Khmer Rouge captured Phnom Penh on 17 April 1975 and began the forced evacuation of all urban centers into the countryside. Like the Imperial Japanese Army’s Kempeitai, the regime—one predicated on violent ethnonationalism—was obsessed with "foreign influence." Prisoners were routinely forced to confess to being agents for the CIA or Vietnam, and accused of being "traitors" or "hidden enemies" of Angkar. The name is a portmanteau of two Khmer words: sântĕsŏkh (សន្តិសុខ), meaning "security," and nôkôrôbal (នគរបាល), meaning "police". It was frequently described as Angkar's "thought police". Literally, the name translates to "keeper of peace". It shared functional similarities with Imperial Japan's Special Higher Police (Tokkō) in terms of ideological control and suppressing "dangerous thoughts." On 1 May 1976, the Santebal had transformed the Tuol Svay Pray High School into a clandestine interrogation, human slaughterhouse and torture facility that managed a network of over 150 such centers, with "Tuol Sleng" (S-21) being the most notorious execution and detention center, which estimates between 18,000 and 20,000 people who entered S-21, only 12 survived. S-21 had focused on extracting political confessions through state-sponsored terror, which often compared to Unit 731 due to its absolute disregard for human life and the systematic nature of its atrocities. Most were killed on-site or transported to the Choeung Ek Killing Fields to be executed with farm tools to save ammunition. While most victims were Cambodian, several hundred foreigners, including the Vietnamese and a small number of Westerners (such as the American and French nationals), were also imprisoned and executed there.

== History ==
As early as 1971, the Khmer Rouge or the Communist Party of Kampuchea established the Special Zone outside of Phnom Penh under the direction of Vorn Vet and Son Sen. Sen, later the Deputy Minister for Defense of Democratic Kampuchea, was also in charge of the Santebal, and in that capacity he appointed Comrade Duch to run its security apparatus. Most of the Santebal's deputies, such as Comrade Chan and Comrade Pon (Chan's deputy), hailed from Kampong Thom, Duch's home province.

When the Khmer Rouge took power in 1975, Duch moved his headquarters to Phnom Penh and reported directly to Sen. At that time, a small chapel in the capital was used to incarcerate the regime's prisoners, who totaled fewer than two hundred. In May 1976, Duch moved his headquarters to its final location, a former high school known as Tuol Sleng, which could hold up to 1,500 prisoners. It was at Tuol Sleng that the major purges of the Khmer Rouge cadres took place and thousands of prisoners were tortured and killed. Between 1976 and 1978, 20,000 Cambodians were imprisoned at Tuol Sleng. Of this number only seven adults are known to have survived. However, Tuol Sleng was only one of at least 150 execution centres in the country.
