= Vann Nath =

Cambodian writer and sculptor (1946-2011)

- វ៉ាន់ណាត
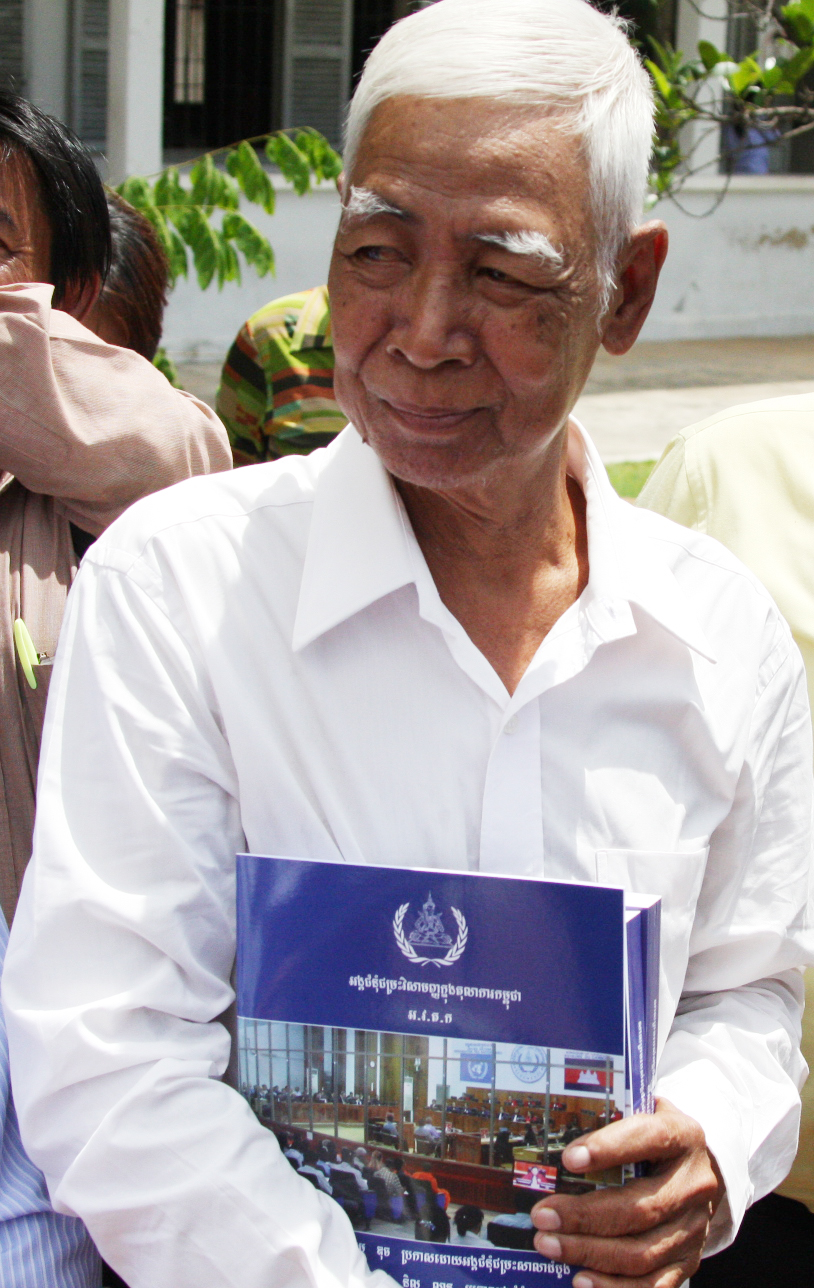
- Vann Nath after having received a copy of the Duch verdict on 12 August 2010
- Born: 1946; Battambang, Cambodia, French Indochina
- Died: 5 September 2011 (aged 64–65); Phnom Penh, Cambodia
- Education: Self-taught Painting at a Pagoda
- Occupations: Painter, writer

Painting of waterboarding at Cambodia's Tuol Sleng Prison, by former inmate Vann Nath

Vann Nath (Khmer: វ៉ាន់ណាត; 1946 – 5 September 2011) was a Cambodian painter, artist, writer, and human rights activist. He was the eighth Cambodian to win the Lillian Hellman/Hammett Award since 1995. He was one of only seven known adult survivors of S-21 camp, where 20,000 Cambodians were tortured and executed during the Khmer Rouge regime (Democratic Kampuchea).

== Biography ==
Vann Nath was born in Phum Sophy village, Srok Battambang district, Battambang Province in northwestern Cambodia. The exact date and year of his birth is unknown, but it was common for poor Cambodians born in rural areas not to have a proper birth certificate. He was educated at Wat Sopee pagoda as a child. His parents were separated, and he had two brothers and an older sister. They earned a living by selling a type of Khmer rice noodles called num banhchok. They were so poor that Nath had no chance to get a proper education. By the time he was 14 or 15, he was working at factory jobs for 500 – 600 riel a month (equivalent to US$1.29 –1.62 today).

Nath became interested in painting while he was studying at Wat Sopee pagoda. "I became very attracted to painting when I went into the pagoda and I saw people painting a picture on the side of the wall of a temple." Instead of pursuing painting, he served as a monk from the age of 17 to 21. "Every family has a son [...] one of the sons must go and serve as a monk—‌it is considered bad for the Cambodian family to not have a son who is a monk", says Vann Nath.

When his sister died, Vann Nath left the monkhood to start working to help support the family. He enrolled in a private painting school in 1965. "School was far from my house, and I couldn't afford a bicycle. Because our family life was hard, only my mother was working to support the whole family and she became older and older and I had to pay the tuition for the painting school." Later, the school allowed Vann Nath to work there in exchange for the tuition fee. After two years, he was able to profit from his own painting work.

== Khmer Rouge ==
At the time of his arrest on 7 January 1978, Vann Nath was working in a rice field in his home province of Battambang like many other Battambang locals. The Khmer Rouge took him to Wat Kandal, a Buddhist temple used as a detainment center. They told him that he was accused of violating the moral code of the organization of Angkar. He did not understand what that meant.

A week later, Vann Nath was deported and transferred to a security prison in Phnom Penh which was formerly known as Chao Ponhea Yat high school but was now known simply as S-21 (and later infamously known as "Tuol Sleng") by the Khmer Rouge. There, people were interrogated, tortured and executed on a daily basis. After the Vietnamese invasion in 1979 and the fall of the Khmer Rouge regime, only seven adult prisoners made it out of the prison alive—‌Vann Nath was one of them.

== Career ==
Vann Nath was a painter and writer whose memoirs and paintings of his experiences in the infamous Tuol Sleng prison are a powerful and poignant testimony to the crimes of the Khmer Rouge and the communist regime.

Vann Nath was an outspoken advocate for justice for victims of the crimes of the Khmer Rouge and this is reflected in his writing. His 1998 memoir A Cambodian Prison Portrait: One Year in the Khmer Rouge's S-21 Prison, about his experiences at S-21, at that time was the only written account by a survivor of the prison. It has been translated from English into French and Swedish.

Vann Nath was one of Cambodia's most prominent artists. His life was only spared by prison camp chief Kang Kek Iew so that he could be put to work on painting and sculpting portraits of Pol Pot. He played an important role in helping to revive the arts in Cambodia after decades of war and genocide.

During 2001 and 2002, Vann Nath worked intensively with Cambodian film director Rithy Panh in the preparation of a documentary film entitled S-21: The Khmer Rouge Killing Machine. Vann Nath was interviewed in the film, in which Panh brought together former prisoners and guards of the former Tuol Sleng prison. Vann Nath confronted and questioned his former torturers in the documentary film. To recognize their work, both Vann Nath and Rithy Panh have been conferred the title of Dr honoris causa by the University of Paris VIII on 24 May 2011.

== Honours ==
He was a recipient of Lillian Hellman/Hammett Award, which recognises courage in the face of political persecution, which he faced during the Khmer Rouge.

== Illness ==
Despite battling long-standing health problems including chronic kidney disease, Vann Nath continued to paint and write about his experiences under the Pol Pot regime. Vann Nath died at the Calmette Hospital in Phnom Penh on September 5, 2011, after suffering a heart attack and going into a coma; he was approximately 65 years old.

== See also ==
- Kang Kek Iew
- John Dawson Dewhirst
- Eufrosinia Kersnovskaya
- Chum Mey
- Bou Meng
- Tuol Sleng
- Torture
