= Tuol Sleng Genocide Museum =

Former Khmer Rouge prison in Cambodia

- Cambodian National Museum; Former Security Prison 21 by the Santebal
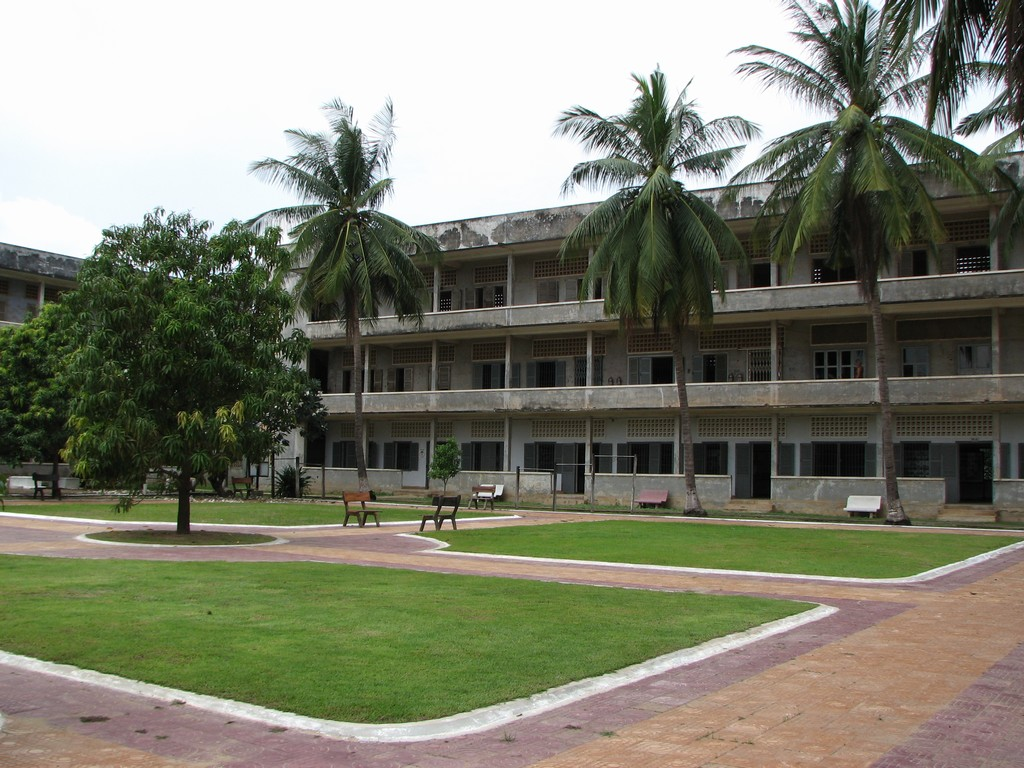
- The exterior of the Tuol Sleng Genocide Museum, 2006

- Location within Cambodia
- Coordinates: 11°32′58″N 104°55′04″E
- Other names: S-21
- Known for: Genocide, mass murder and torture of enemies of the Khmer Rouge
- Location: St.113, Boeung Keng Kang III, Khan Boeng Keng Kang, Phnom Penh, Cambodia
- Operated by: Khmer Rouge
- Commandant: Kang Kek Iew
- Original use: High school
- Operational: S-21 as institution = August 1975, The buildings of the former high school = beginning 1976
- Inmates: Political enemies of the Khmer Rouge, ethnic minorities, religious minorities and leaders.
- Number of inmates: 18,145 prisoners, probably more
- Killed: 18,133 (source: ECCC list of the inmates by the co-prosecutors in Case 001/01)
- Liberated by: People's Army of Vietnam
- Notable inmates: Bou Meng, Chum Mey, and Vann Nath
- Website: tuolsleng.gov.kh

UNESCO World Heritage Site
- Part of: Cambodian Memorial Sites: From centres of repression to places of peace and reflection
- Criteria: Cultural: vi
- Reference: 1748-002
- Inscription: 2025 (47th Session)

The Tuol Sleng Genocide Museum (Note: Khmer: សារមន្ទីរឧក្រិដ្ឋកម្មប្រល័យពូជសាសន៍ទួលស្លែង, romanized: Saromontir Ukredth Kamm Braly Pouchsasa Tuol Sleng), or simply Tuol Sleng (Khmer: ទួលស្លែង, Tuŏl Slêng [tuəl slaeŋ]; lit. "Hill of the Poisonous Trees" or "Strychnine Hill") is a museum for the Cambodian genocide. Located in Phnom Penh, the site is a former secondary school that had been turned into an internment facility known as Security Prison 21 (Note: Khmer: មន្ទីរស-២១, romanized: Montir Sa-21) (S-21) by the Khmer Rouge regime from 1975 until its fall in 1979. From 1976 to 1979, an estimated 20,000 people were imprisoned at Tuol Sleng; it was one of between 150 and 196 torture and execution centers established by the Khmer Rouge and their secret police.

On 26 July 2010, the Extraordinary Chambers in the Courts of Cambodia convicted the prison's chief, Kang Kek Iew, for crimes against humanity and grave breaches of the 1949 Geneva Conventions. He died in 2020 while serving a life sentence.

== History ==
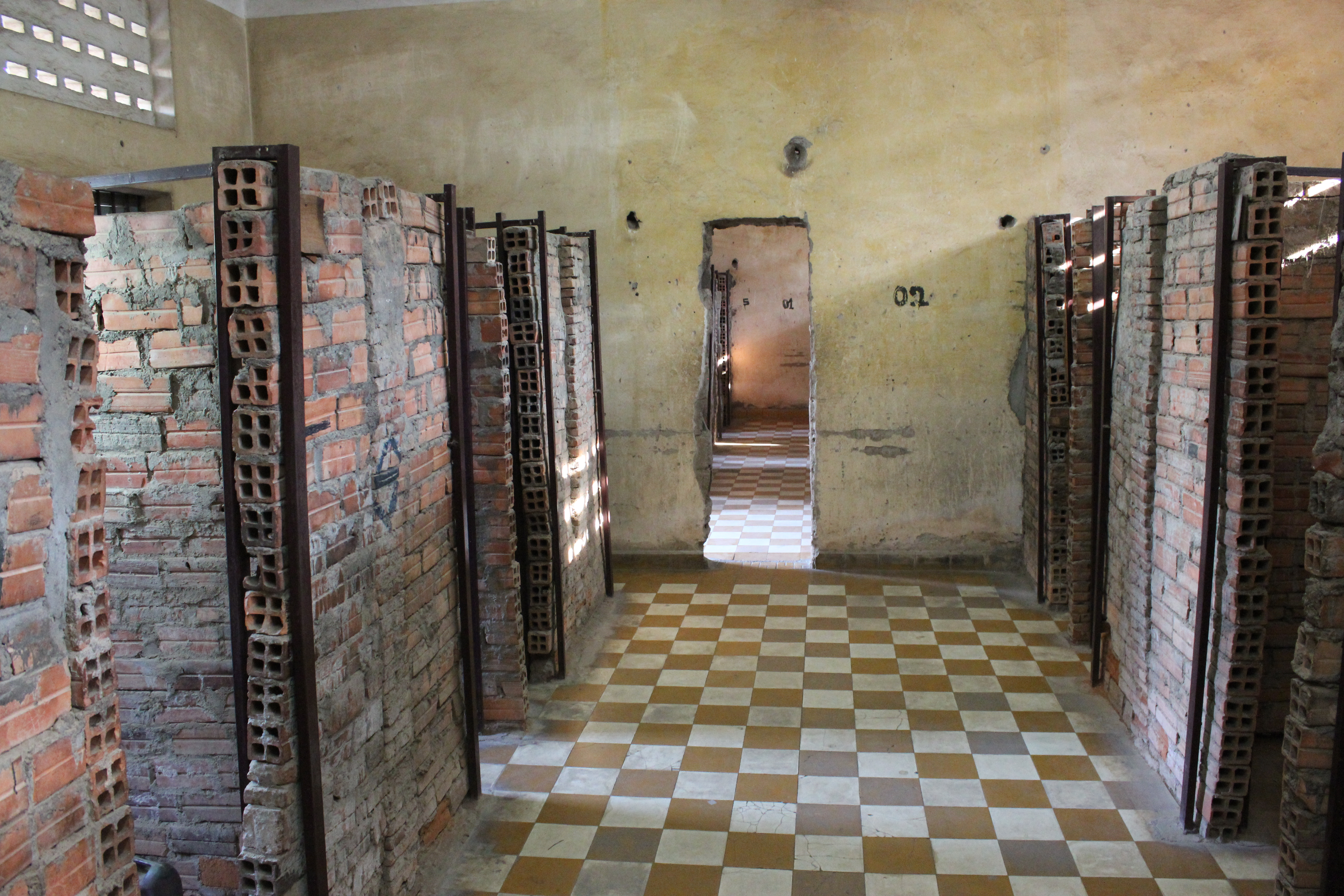
Most of the school rooms were divided into cells

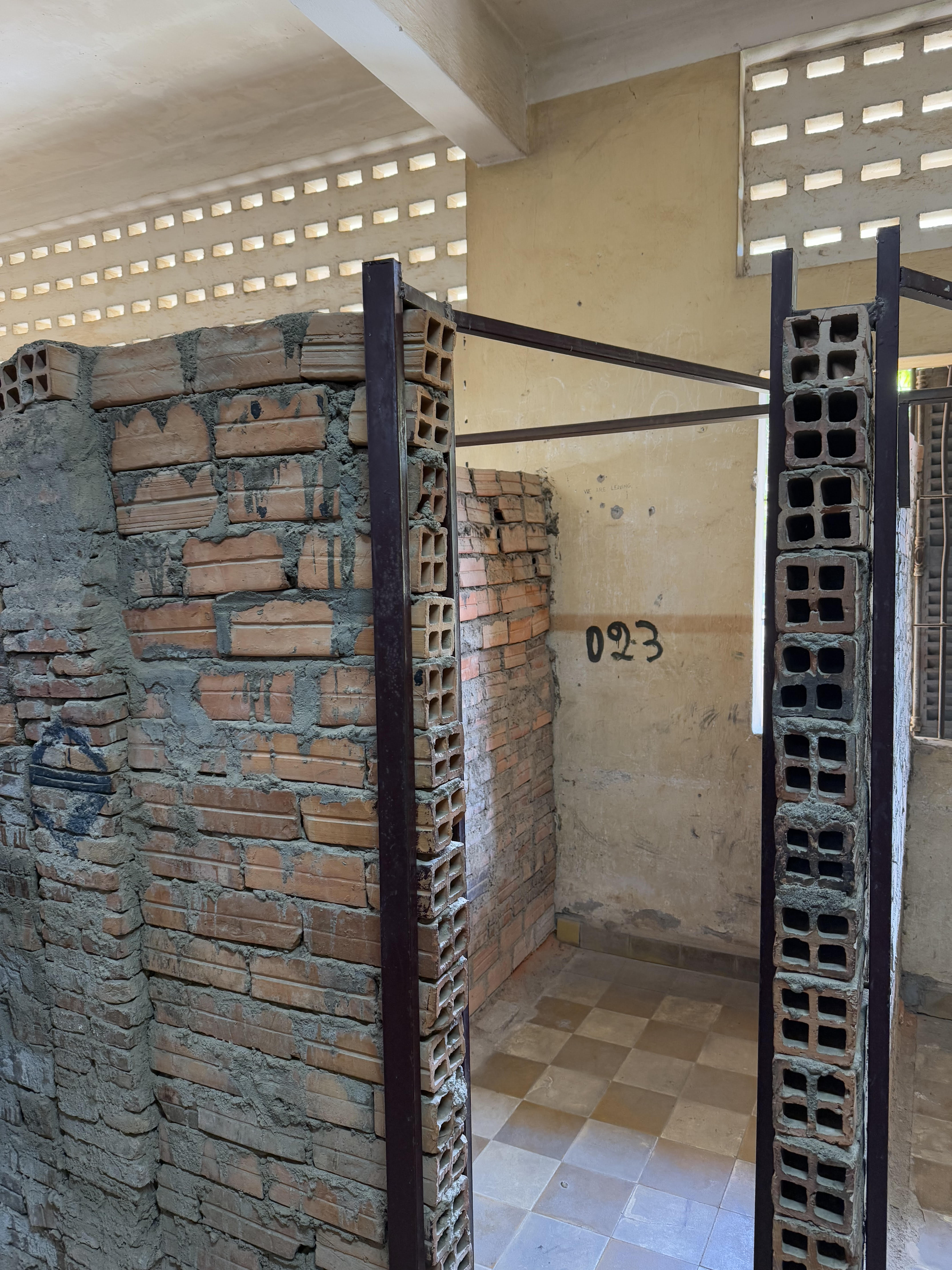
A brick cell inside Cambodia's S-21 prison

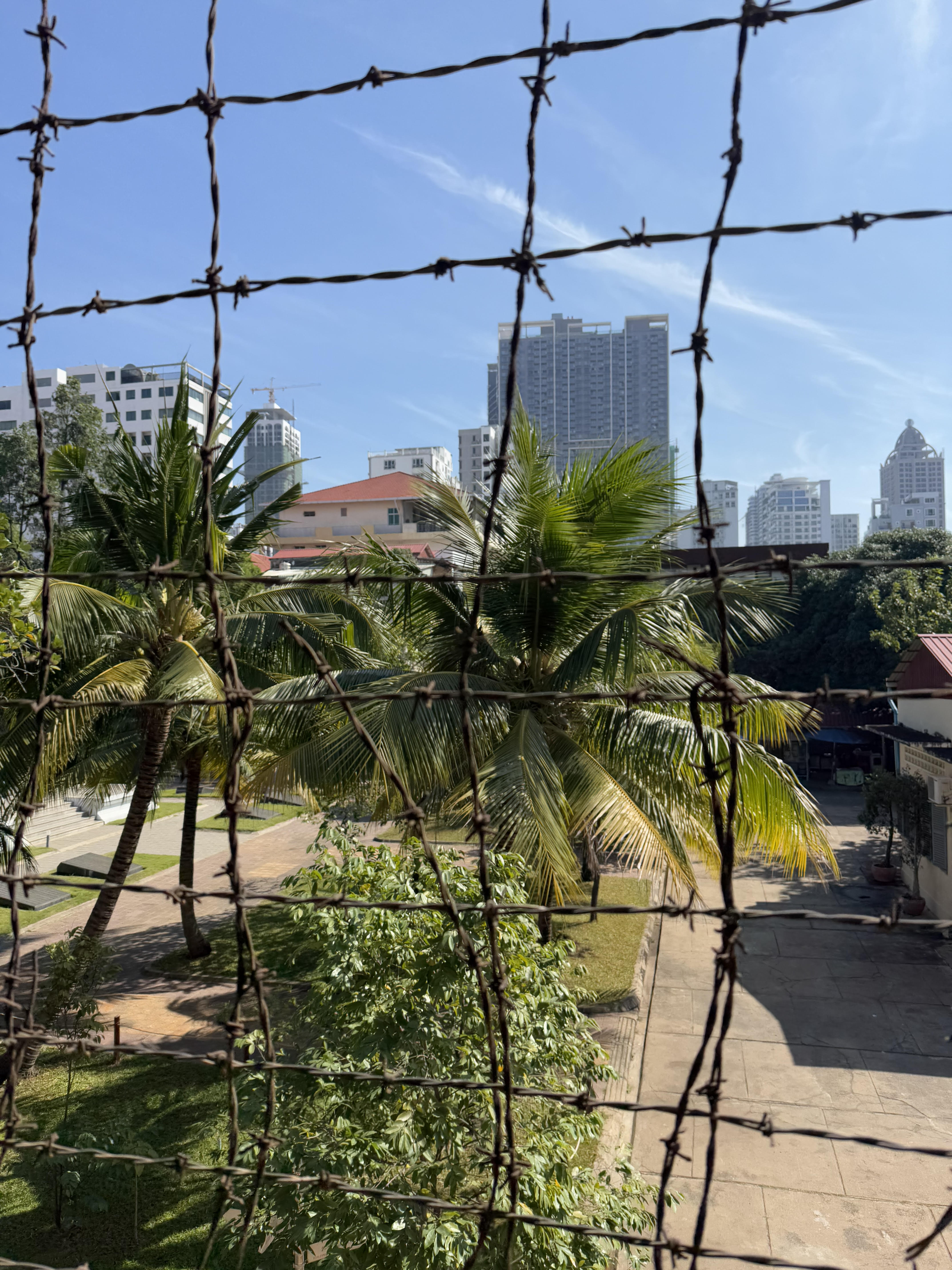
View from inside an S-21 Prison Cell

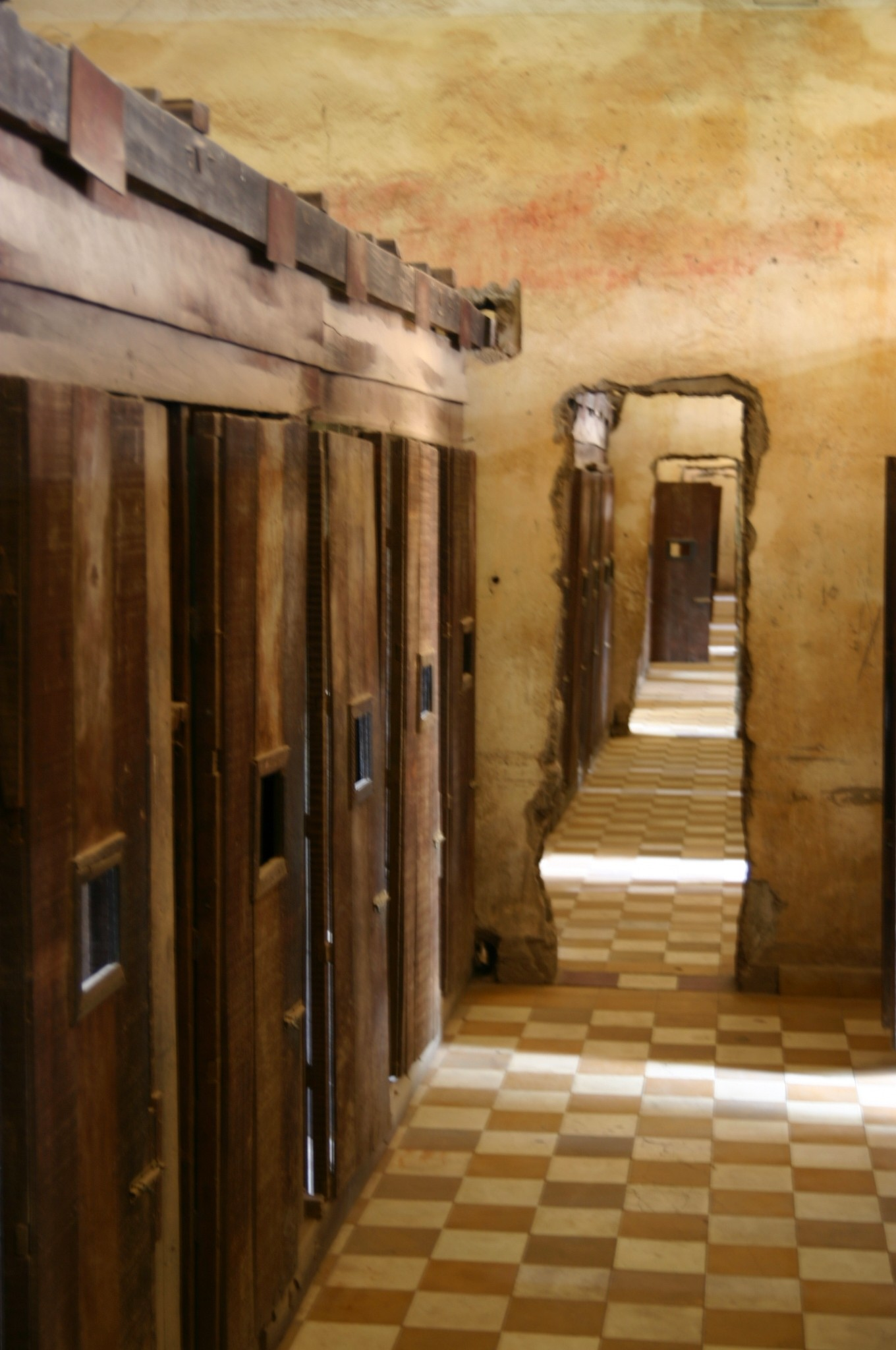
Cells in the prison

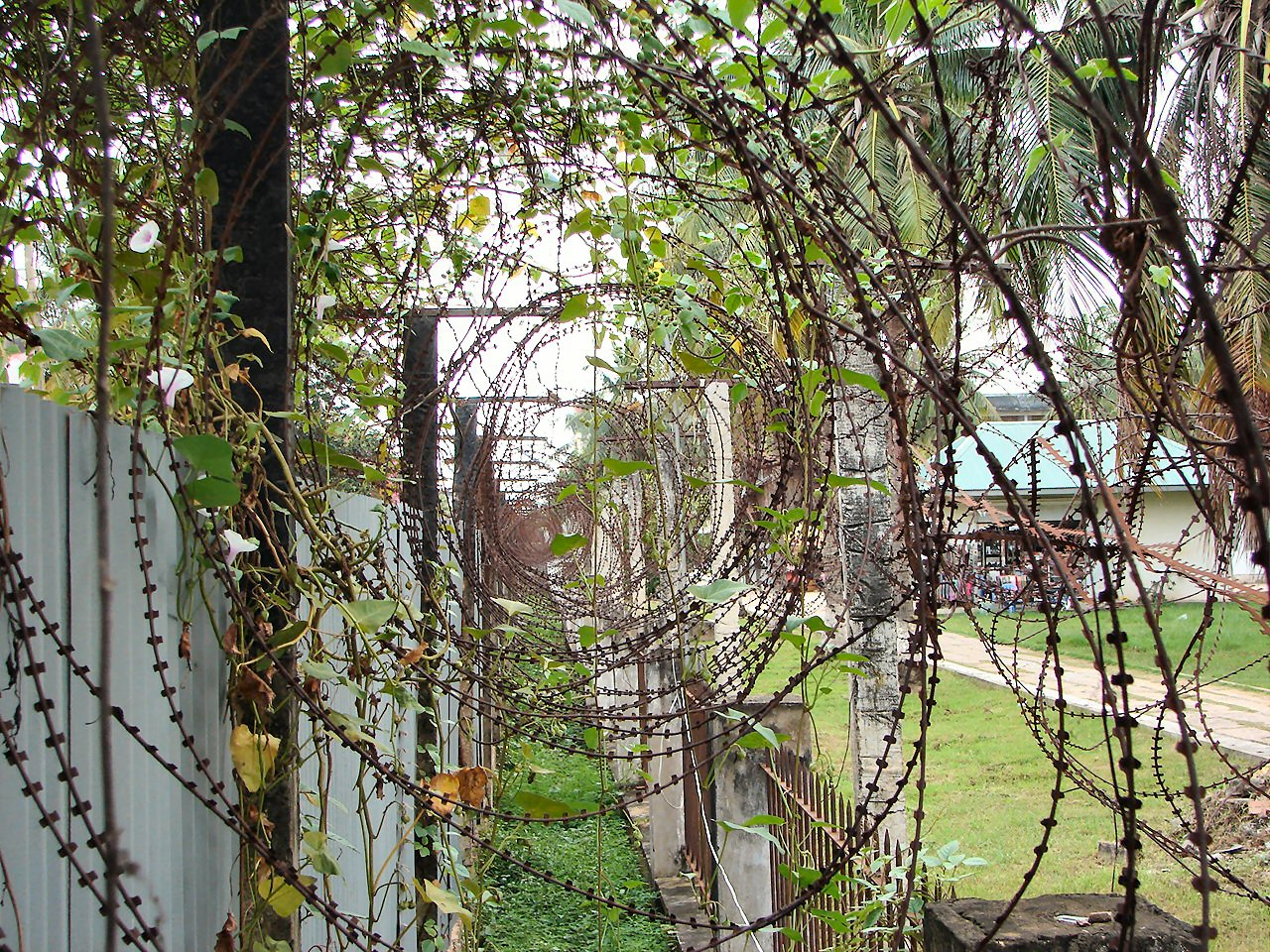
Razor wire around the perimeter

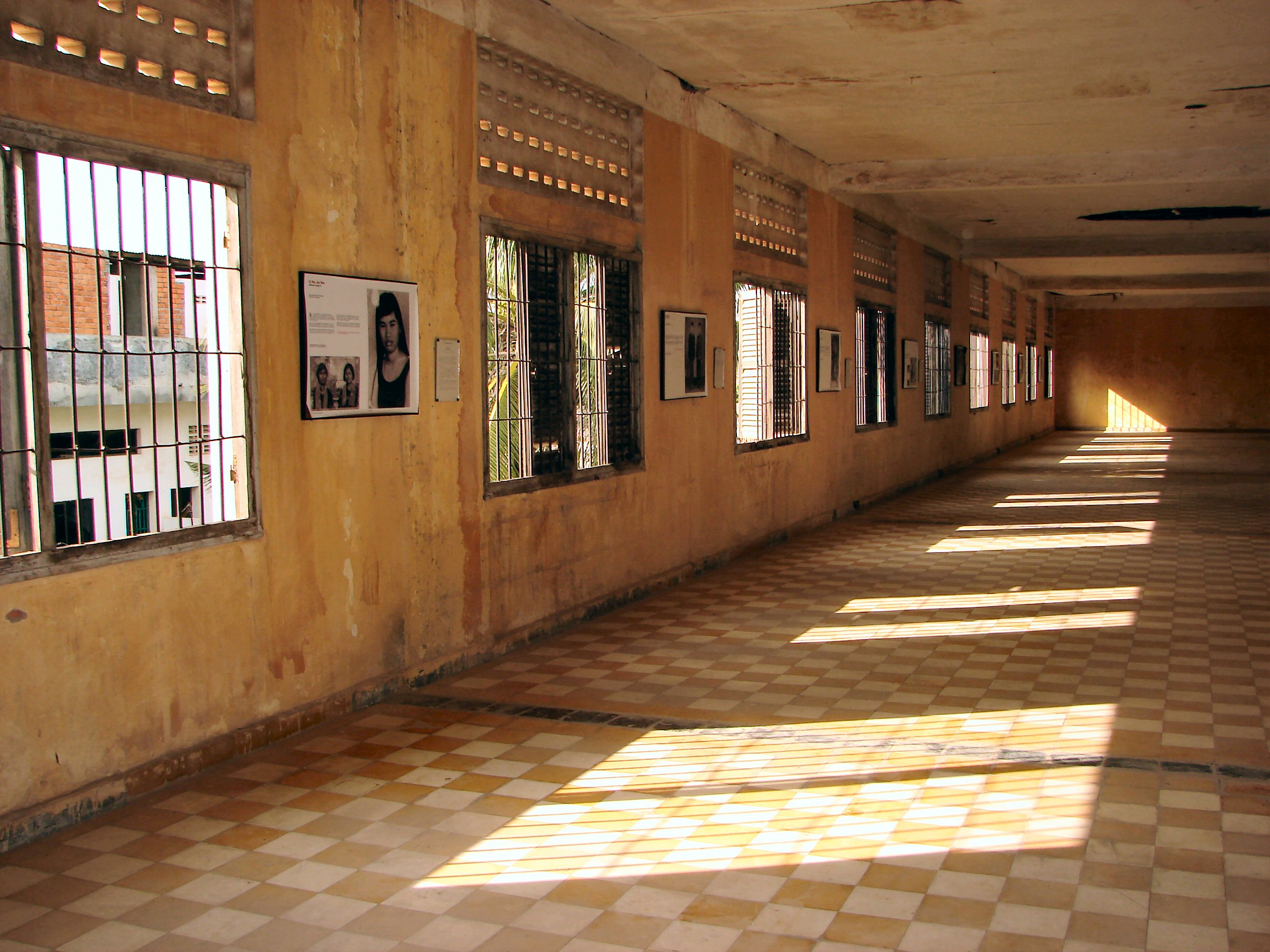
Inside the museum

To accommodate the victims of purges that were important enough for the attention of the Khmer Rouge, a new detention center was planned in the building that was formerly known as Tuol Svay Prey High School, named after a royal ancestor of King Norodom Sihanouk. The five buildings of the complex were converted in March or April 1976 into a prison and an interrogation center. Other buildings in town had already been used as prison S-21. The Khmer Rouge renamed the complex "Security Prison 21" (S-21) and construction began to adapt the prison for the inmates: the buildings were enclosed in electrified barbed wire, the classrooms converted into tiny prison and torture chambers, and all windows were covered with iron bars and barbed wire to prevent escapes and suicides.

From 1976 to 1979, an estimated 20,000 people were imprisoned at Tuol Sleng (the precise number is unknown). At any one time, the prison held between 1,000 and 1,500 prisoners. They were repeatedly tortured and coerced into naming family members and close associates, who were in turn arrested, tortured and killed. In the early months of S-21's existence, most of the victims were from the previous Lon Nol regime and included soldiers, government officials, as well as academics, doctors, teachers, students, factory workers, monks, engineers, etc. Later, the party leadership's paranoia turned on its own ranks, and purges throughout the country brought thousands of party activists and their families to Tuol Sleng, where they were murdered. Those arrested included some of the highest ranking politicians such as Khoy Thoun, Vorn Vet and Hu Nim. Although the official reason for their arrest was "espionage", these men may have been viewed by Khmer Rouge leader Pol Pot as potential leaders of a coup against him. Prisoners' families were sometimes brought en masse to be interrogated and later executed at the Choeung Ek extermination center.

In 1979, the prison was uncovered by the invading Vietnamese army. At some point between 1979 and 1980 the prison was reopened by the government of the People's Republic of Kampuchea as a historical museum memorializing the actions of the Khmer Rouge regime.

=== Routine ===
Upon arrival at the prison, prisoners were photographed and required to give detailed autobiographies, beginning with their childhood and ending with their arrest. After that, they were forced to strip to their underwear, and their possessions were confiscated. The prisoners were then taken to their cells. Those taken to the smaller cells were shackled to the walls or the concrete floor. Those who were held in the large mass cells were collectively shackled to long pieces of iron bar. The shackles were fixed to alternating bars; the prisoners slept with their heads in opposite directions. They slept on the floor without mats, mosquito nets, or blankets. They were forbidden to talk to each other.

The day began in the prison at 4:30 a.m. when prisoners were ordered to strip for inspection. The guards checked to see if the shackles were loose or if the prisoners had hidden objects they could use to commit suicide. Over the years, several prisoners managed to kill themselves, so the guards were very careful in checking the shackles and cells. The prisoners received four small spoonfuls of rice porridge and a watery soup of leaves twice a day. Drinking water without asking the guards for permission resulted in serious beatings. The inmates were hosed down every four days.

The prison had very strict regulations, and severe beatings were inflicted upon any prisoner who disobeyed. Almost every action had to be approved by one of the prison's guards. The prisoners were sometimes forced to eat human feces and drink human urine. The unhygienic living conditions in the prison caused skin diseases, lice, rashes, ringworm and other ailments. The prison's medical staff were untrained and offered treatment only to sustain prisoners' lives after they had been injured during interrogation. When prisoners were taken from one place to another for interrogation, they were blindfolded. Guards and prisoners were not allowed to converse. Moreover, within the prison, people who were in different groups were not allowed to have contact with one another.

=== Torture and extermination ===
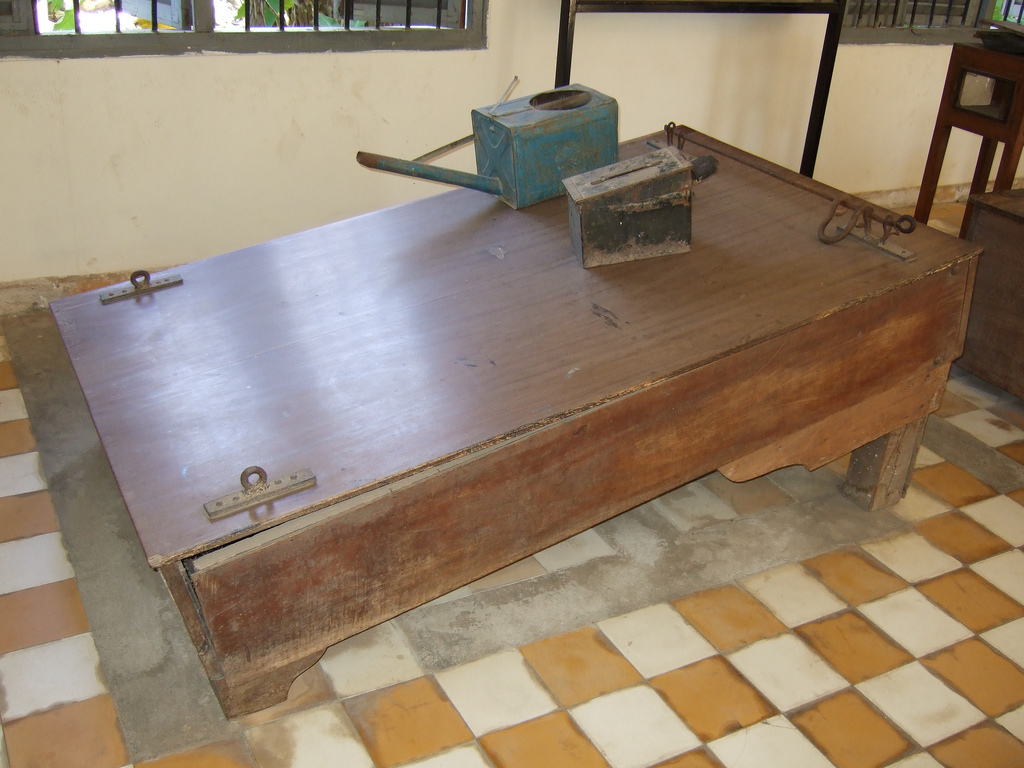
Waterboard displayed at Tuol Sleng. Prisoners' legs were shackled to the bar on the right, their wrists were restrained to the brackets on the left and hot water was poured over their face using the blue watering can.

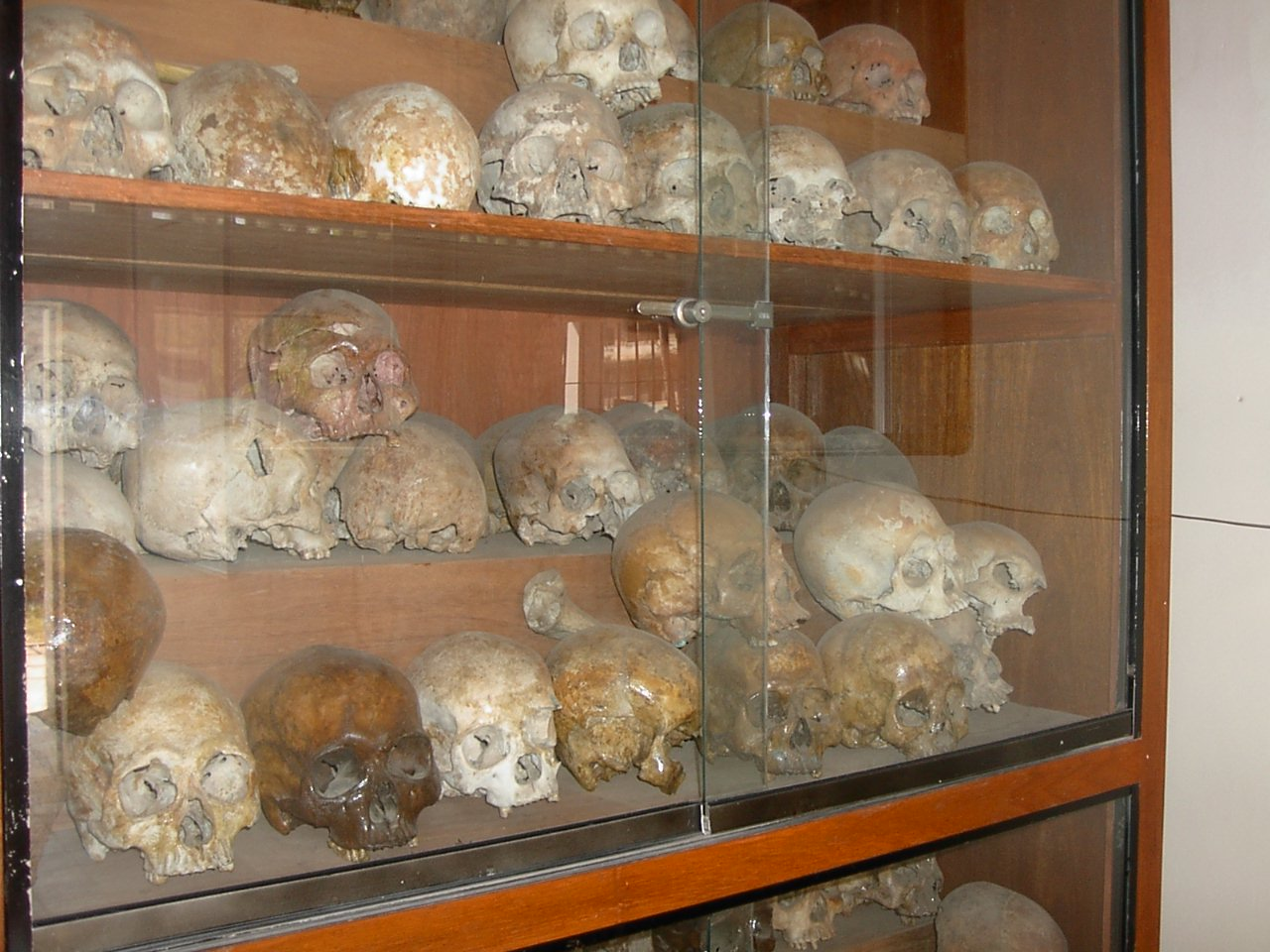
Cabinets filled with human skulls

Most prisoners at S-21 were held there for two to three months. Within two or three days after they were brought to S-21, all prisoners were taken for interrogation. The torture system at Tuol Sleng was designed to make prisoners confess to whatever crimes they were charged with by their captors. Prisoners were routinely beaten and tortured with electric shocks, searing hot metal instruments and hanging, as well as through the use of various other devices. Some prisoners were cut with knives or suffocated with plastic bags. Other methods for generating confessions included pulling out fingernails while pouring alcohol on the wounds, holding prisoners' heads under water, and the use of waterboarding. Women were sometimes raped by the interrogators, even though sexual abuse was against Democratic Kampuchea (DK) policy. The perpetrators who were found out were executed. Although many prisoners died from this kind of abuse, killing them outright was discouraged, since the Khmer Rouge needed their confessions. The "Medical Unit" at Tuol Sleng, however, did kill at least 100 prisoners by bleeding them to death. It is proven that medical experiments were performed on certain prisoners. There is clear evidence that patients in Cambodia were sliced open and had organs removed with no anesthetic. The camp's director, Kang Kek Iew, has acknowledged that "live prisoners were used for surgical study and training. Draining blood was also done."

In their confessions, the prisoners were asked to describe their personal background. If they were party members, they had to say when they joined the revolution and describe their work assignments in DK. Then the prisoners would relate their supposed treasonous activities in chronological order. The third section of the confession text described prisoners' thwarted conspiracies and supposed treasonous conversations. At the end, the confessions would list a string of traitors who were the prisoners' friends, colleagues, or acquaintances. Some lists contained over a hundred names. People whose names were in the confession list were often called in for interrogation.

Typical confessions ran into thousands of words in which the prisoner would interweave true events in their lives with imaginary accounts of their espionage activities for the CIA, the KGB, or Vietnam. Physical torture was combined with sleep deprivation and deliberate neglect of the prisoners. The torture implements are on display in the museum. It is believed that the vast majority of prisoners were innocent of the charges against them and that the torture produced false confessions.

For the first year of S-21's existence, corpses were buried near the prison. However, by the end of 1976, cadres ran out of burial spaces, and the prisoner and family members were taken to the Boeung Choeung Ek ("Crow's Feet Pond") extermination centre, fifteen kilometers from Phnom Penh. There, they were killed by a group of teenagers led by a Comrade Teng, being battered to death with iron bars, pickaxes, machetes and many other makeshift weapons owing to the scarcity and cost of ammunition. After the prisoners were executed, the soldiers who had accompanied them from S-21 buried them in graves that held between as few as 6 and as many as 100 bodies.

=== Non-Cambodian prisoners ===
Almost all non-Cambodians had left the country by early May 1975, following an overland evacuation of the French Embassy in trucks. The few who remained were seen as a security risk.

Even though the majority of the victims were Cambodian, some were non-Cambodians, including 488 Vietnamese, 31 Thai, four French, two Americans, two Australians, one Laotian, one Arab, one Briton, one Canadian, one New Zealander, and one Indonesian. Khmers of Indian and Pakistani descent were also victims. A number of Western prisoners, many picked up at sea by Khmer Rouge patrol boats, also passed through S-21 between April 1976 and December 1978. No foreign prisoners survived captivity in S-21.

Two Franco-Vietnamese brothers named Rovin and Harad Bernard were detained in April 1976 after they were transferred from Siem Reap, where they had worked tending cattle. Another Frenchman named Andre Gaston Courtigne, a 30-year-old clerk and typist at the French embassy, was arrested the same month along with his Khmer wife in Siem Reap.

It is possible that a handful of French nationals who went missing after the 1975 evacuation of Phnom Penh also passed through S-21. Two Americans were captured under similar circumstances. James Clark and Lance McNamara in April 1978 were sailing when their boat drifted off course and sailed into Cambodian waters. They were arrested by Khmer patrol boats, taken ashore, where they were blindfolded, placed on trucks, and taken to the then-deserted Phnom Penh.

Twenty-six-year-old John Dawson Dewhirst, a British tourist, was one of the youngest foreigners to die in the prison. He was sailing with his New Zealand companion, Kerry Hamill, and their Canadian friend Stuart Glass when their boat drifted into Cambodian territory and was intercepted by Khmer patrol boats on 13 August 1978. Glass was killed during the arrest, while Dewhirst and Hamill were captured, blindfolded, and taken to shore. Both were executed after having been tortured for several months at Tuol Sleng. Witnesses reported that a foreigner was burned alive; initially, it was suggested that this might have been John Dewhirst, but a survivor later identified Kerry Hamill as the victim of this particular act of brutality. Robert Hamill, his brother and a champion Atlantic rower, years later made a documentary, Brother Number One, about his brother's incarceration.

One of the last foreign prisoners to die was 29-year-old American Michael S. Deeds, who was captured with his friend Christopher E. DeLance on 24 November 1978, while sailing from Singapore to Hawaii. His confession was signed a week before the Vietnamese army invaded Cambodia and ousted the Khmer Rouge. In 1989, Deeds's brother, Karl Deeds, traveled to Cambodia in attempts to find his brother's remains, but was unsuccessful. On 3 September 2012, DeLance's photograph was identified among the caches of inmate portraits.

As of 1999, there were a total of 79 foreign victims on record, but former Tuol Sleng Khmer Rouge photographer Nim Im claims that the records are not complete. On top of that, there is also an eyewitness account of a Filipino, a Cuban and a Swiss who passed through the prison, though no official records are shown.

=== Survivors ===
Out of an estimated 20,000 people imprisoned at Tuol Sleng, there were only twelve known survivors: seven adults and five children. One child died shortly after the liberation. As of mid-September 2011, only three of the adults and four children are thought to still be alive: Chum Mey, Bou Meng, and Chim Meth. All three said they were kept alive because they had skills their captors judged to be useful. Bou Meng, whose wife was killed in the prison, was an artist. Chum Mey was kept alive because of his skills in repairing machinery. Chim Meth was held in S-21 for two weeks and transferred to the nearby Prey Sar prison. She may have been spared because she was from Stoeung district in Kampong Thom where Comrade Duch was born. She intentionally distinguished herself by emphasizing her provincial accent during her interrogations. Vann Nath, who was spared because of his ability to paint, died on 5 September 2011. Norng Chan Phal, one of the surviving children, published his story in 2018.

The Documentation Center of Cambodia has recently estimated that, in fact, at least 179 prisoners were freed from S-21 between 1975 and 1979 and approximately 23 prisoners (including five children, two of them siblings Norng Chanphal and Norng Chanly) survived when the prison was liberated in January 1979. One child died shortly thereafter. Of the 179 prisoners who were released, most disappeared and only a few are known to have survived after 1979. It was found that at least 60 persons (out of the DC Cam list) who are listed as having survived were first released but later rearrested and executed.

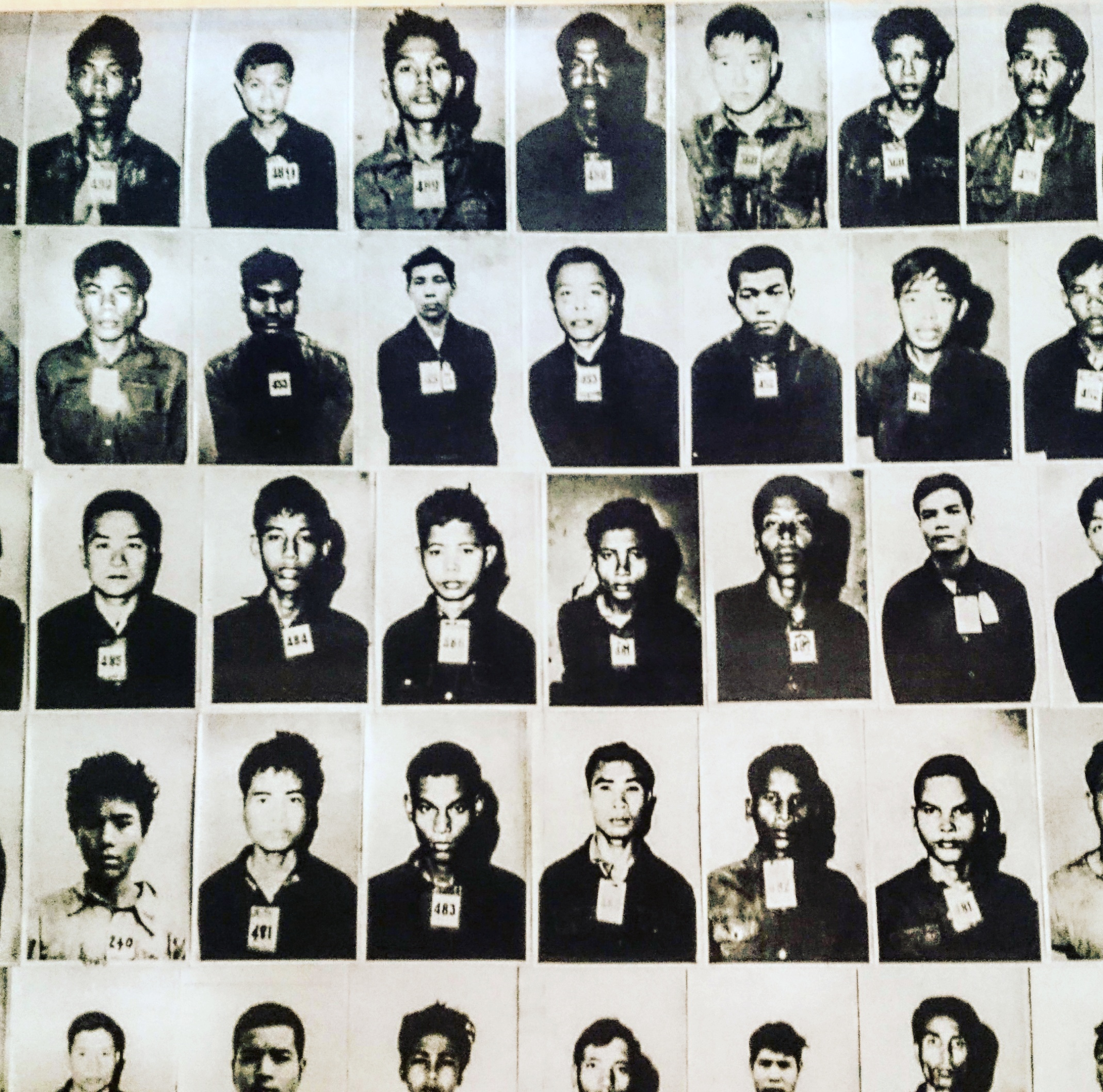
Photographs of victims on display

=== Staff ===
The prison had a staff of 1,720 people throughout the whole period. Of those, approximately 300 were office staff, internal workforce and interrogators. The other 1,400 were general workers, including people who grew food for the prison. Several of these workers were children taken from the prisoner families. The chief of the prison was Khang Khek Ieu (also known as Comrade Duch), a former mathematics teacher who worked closely with Khmer Rouge leader Pol Pot. Other leading figures of S-21 were Kim Vat aka Ho (deputy chief of S-21), Peng (chief of guards), Mam Nai aka Chan (chief of the Interrogation Unit), and Tang Sin Hean aka Pon (interrogator). Pon was the person who interrogated important people such as Keo Meas, Nay Sarann, Ho Nim, Tiv Ol, and Phok Chhay.

The documentation unit was responsible for transcribing tape recorded confessions, typing the handwritten notes from prisoners' confessions, preparing summaries of confessions, and maintaining files. In the photography sub-unit, workers took mug shots of prisoners when they arrived, pictures of prisoners who had died while in detention, and pictures of important prisoners after they were executed. Thousands of photographs have survived. Thousands of photographs are still missing.

The defense unit was the largest unit in S-21. The guards in this unit were mostly teenagers. Many guards found the unit's strict rules hard to obey. Guards were not allowed to talk to prisoners, to learn their names, or to beat them. They were also forbidden to observe or eavesdrop on interrogations, and they were expected to obey 30 regulations, which barred them from things such as taking naps, sitting down, or leaning against a wall while on duty. They had to walk, guard, and examine everything carefully. Guards who made serious mistakes were arrested, interrogated, jailed and put to death. Most of the people employed at S-21 were terrified of making mistakes and feared being tortured and killed.

The interrogation unit was split into three separate groups: Krom Noyobai or the political unit, Krom Kdao or the hot unit and Krom Angkiem, or the chewing unit. The hot unit (sometimes called the cruel unit) was allowed to use torture. In contrast, the cold unit (sometimes called the gentle unit) was prohibited from using torture to obtain confessions. If they could not make prisoners confess, they would transfer them to the hot unit. The chewing unit dealt with tough and important cases. Those who worked as interrogators were literate and usually in their 20s.

Some of the staff who worked in Tuol Sleng also ended up as prisoners. They confessed to being lazy in preparing documents, to having damaged machines and various equipment, and to having beaten prisoners to death without permission when assisting with interrogations.

=== Security regulations ===
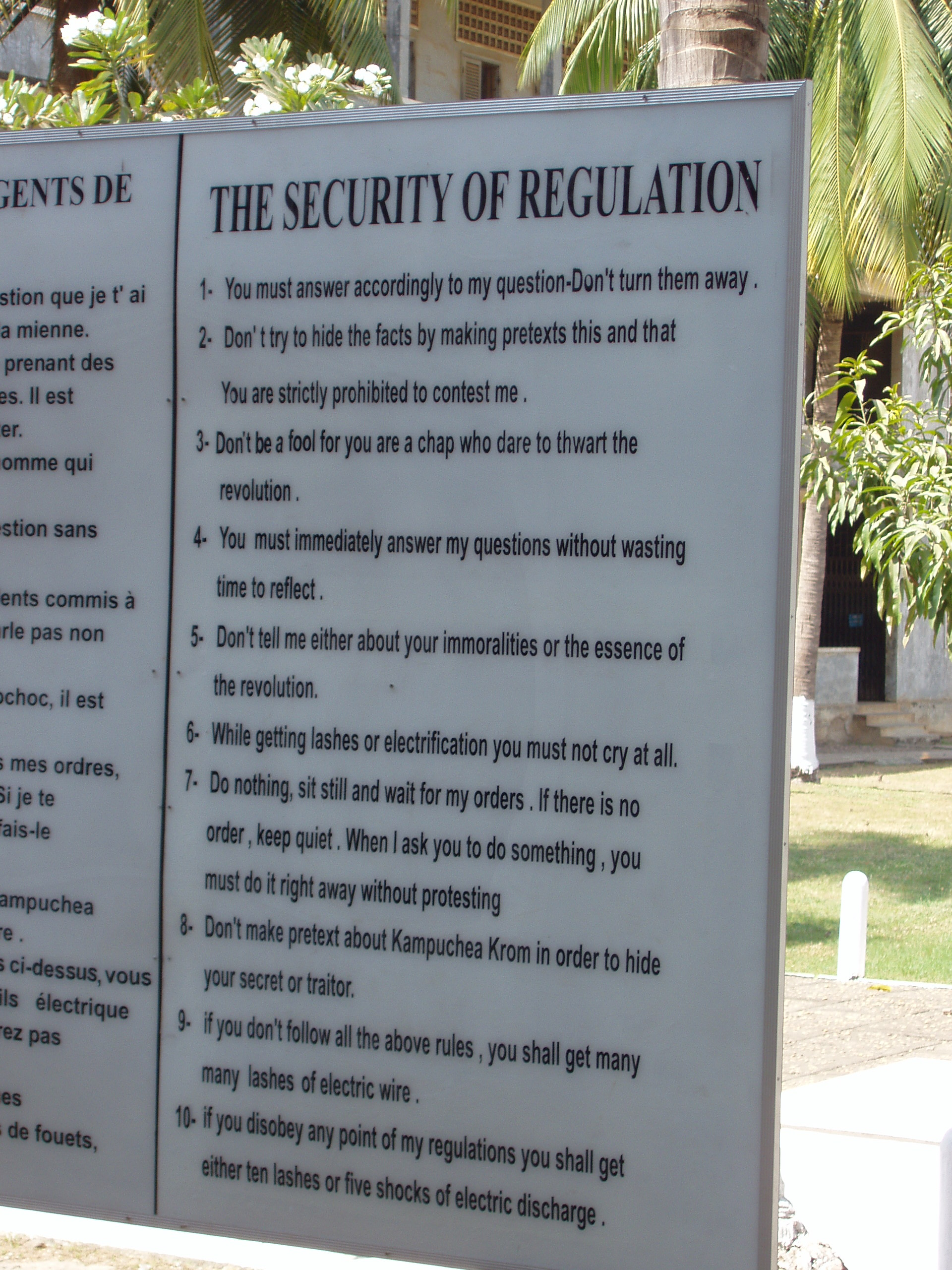
Concentration camp rules

When prisoners were first brought to Tuol Sleng, they were made aware of ten rules that they were to follow during their incarceration. What follows is what is posted today at the Tuol Sleng Museum; the imperfect grammar is a result of faulty translation from the original Khmer:

1. You must answer accordingly to my question. Don't turn them away.
2. Don't try to hide the facts by making pretexts this and that, you are strictly prohibited to contest me.
3. Don't be a fool, for you are a chap who dare to thwart the revolution.
4. You must immediately answer my questions without wasting time to reflect.
5. Don't tell me either about your immoralities or the essence of the revolution.
6. While getting lashes or electrification you must not cry at all.
7. Do nothing, sit still, and wait for my orders. If there is no order, keep quiet. When I ask you to do something, you must do it right away without protesting.
8. Don't make pretext about Kampuchea Krom in order to hide your secret or traitor.
9. If you don't follow all the above rules, you shall get many lashes of electric wire.
10. If you disobey any point of my regulations you shall get either ten lashes or five shocks of electric discharge.

During testimony at the Khmer Rouge Tribunal on 27 April 2009, Duch claimed the ten security regulations were a fabrication of the Vietnamese officials that first set up the Tuol Sleng Genocide Museum.

=== Discovery ===
In 1979, Hồ Văn Tây, a Vietnamese combat photographer, was the first journalist to document Tuol Sleng to the world. Hồ and his colleagues followed the stench of rotting corpses to the gates of Tuol Sleng. The photos of Tây documenting what he saw when he entered the site are exhibited in Tuol Sleng today.

The Khmer Rouge required that the prison staff make a detailed dossier for each prisoner. Included in the documentation was a photograph. Since the original negatives and photographs were separated from the dossiers in the 1979–1980 period, most of the photographs remain anonymous to this day.

=== Aftermath ===
In 2025, the site was designated as a World Heritage Site by UNESCO as part of the Cambodian Memorial Sites.

== Description ==
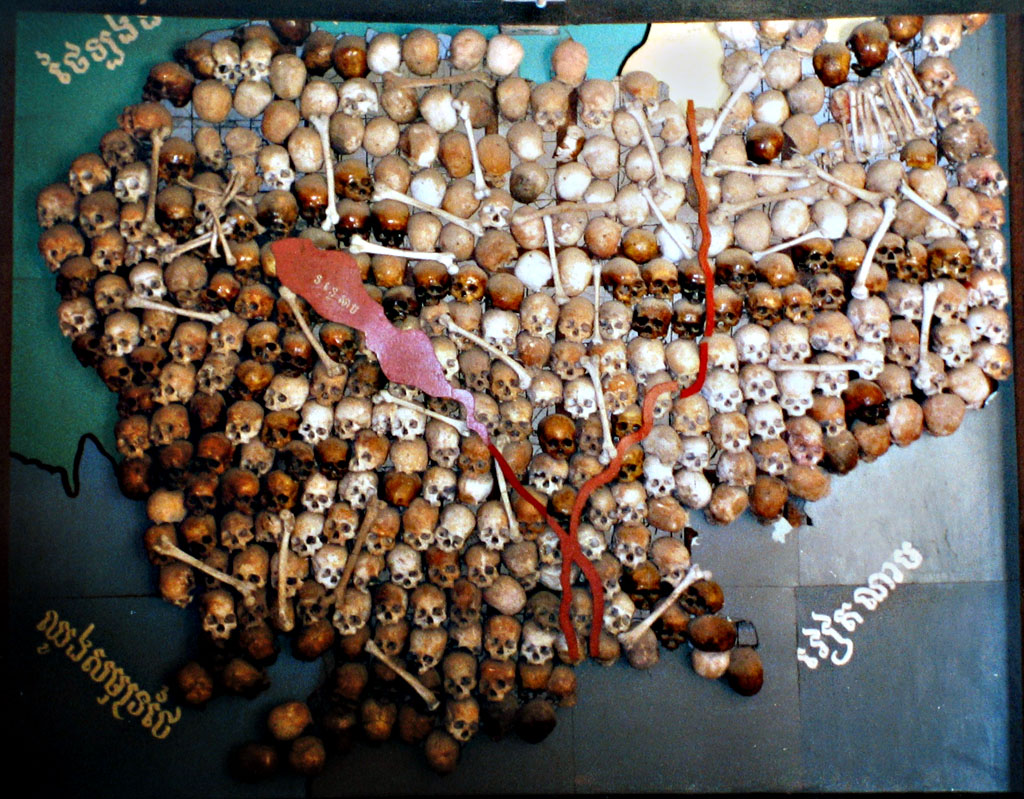
"Cambodia Map of Skulls"

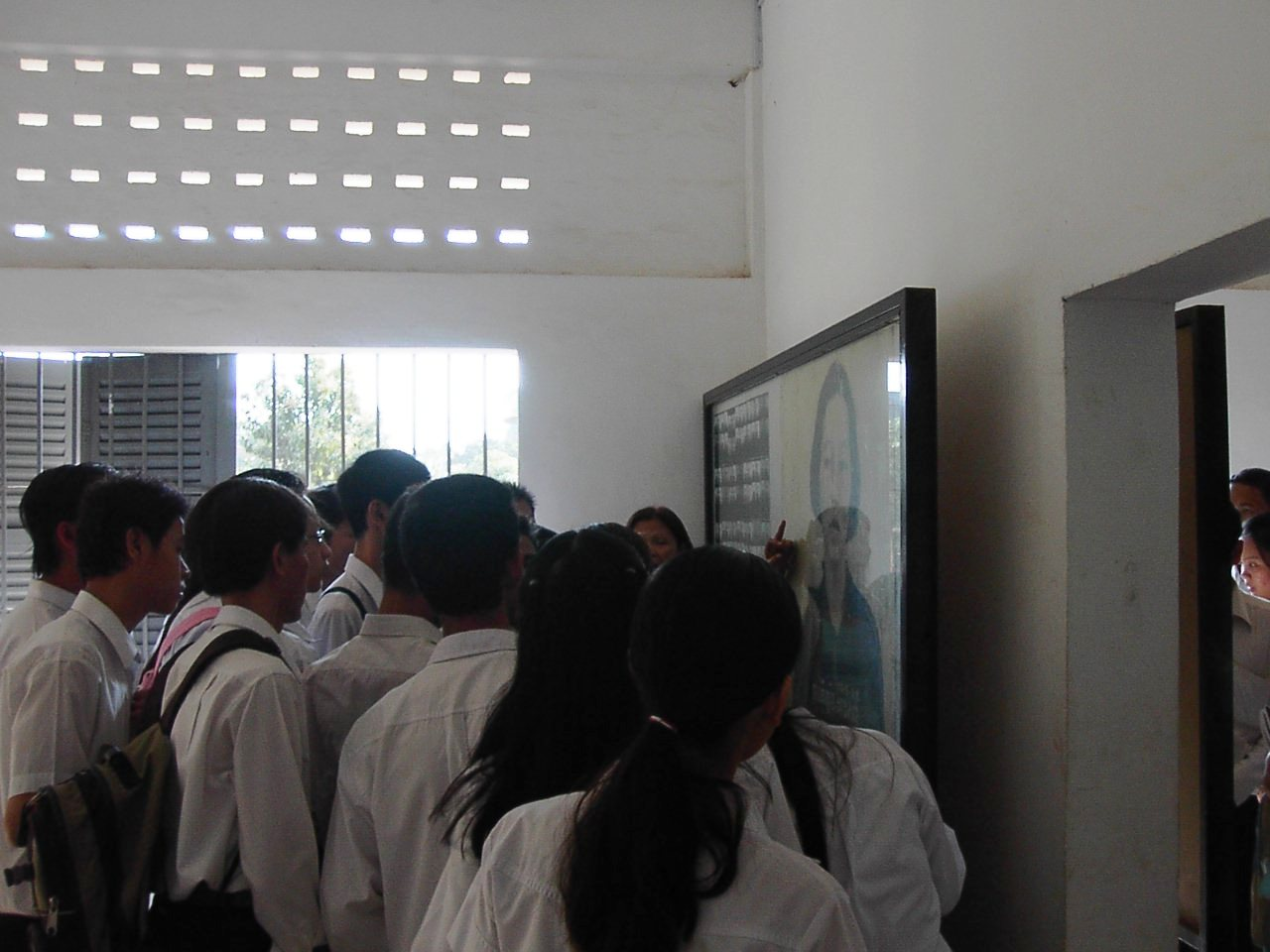
Cambodian school students tour the museum.

The buildings at Tuol Sleng are preserved, with some rooms still appearing just as they were when the Khmer Rouge were driven out in 1979. The regime kept extensive records, including thousands of photographs. Several rooms of the museum are now lined, floor to ceiling, with black and white photographs of some of the estimated 20,000 prisoners who passed through the prison.

The site has four main buildings, known as Building A, B, C, and D. Building A holds the large cells in which the bodies of the last victims were discovered. Building B holds galleries of photographs. Building C holds the rooms subdivided into small cells for prisoners. Building D holds other memorabilia including instruments of torture.

Other rooms contain only a rusting iron bedframe, beneath a black and white photograph showing the room as it was found by the Vietnamese. In each photograph, the mutilated body of a prisoner is chained to the bed, killed by his fleeing captors only hours before the prison was captured. Other rooms preserve leg-irons and instruments of torture. They are accompanied by paintings by former inmate Vann Nath showing people being tortured, which were added by the post-Khmer Rouge regime installed by the Vietnamese in 1979.

The museum is open to the public from 8:00 a.m. to 5:00 p.m. On weekdays, visitors have the opportunity of viewing a 'survivor testimony' from 2:30 p.m. to 3:00 p.m. Along with the Choeung Ek Memorial (the Killing Fields), the Tuol Sleng Genocide Museum is included as a point of interest for those visiting Cambodia. Tuol Sleng also remains an important educational site as well as memorial for Cambodians. Since 2010, the ECCC brings Cambodians on a 'study tour' consisting of the Tuol Sleng, followed by the Choeung Ek, and finishing at the ECCC complex. The tour drew approximately 27,000 visitors in 2010. (Note: See ECCC Court Report January 2011.)

== In popular culture ==
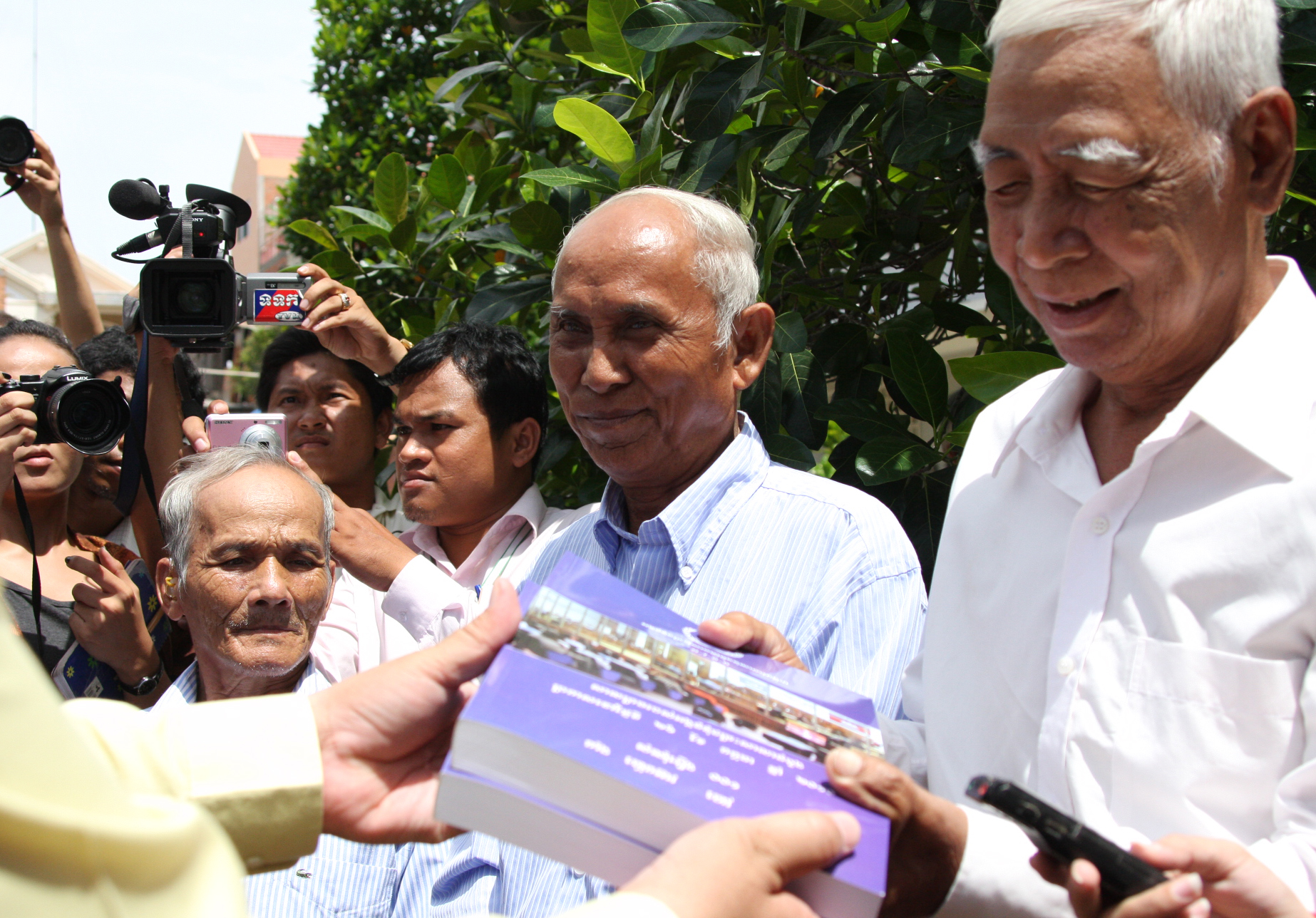
Bou Meng (left), Chum Mey (center) and Vann Nath (right) after having received a copy of the Duch verdict on 12 August 2010. They are three of only a handful of survivors from the secret Khmer Rouge prison S-21 where at least 12,273 people were tortured and executed.

S-21: The Khmer Rouge Killing Machine is a 2003 film by Rithy Panh, a Cambodian-born, French-trained filmmaker who lost his family when he was 11. The film features two Tuol Sleng survivors, Vann Nath and Chum Mey, confronting their former Khmer Rouge captors, including guards, interrogators, a doctor and a photographer. The focus of the film is the difference between the feelings of the survivors, who want to understand what happened at Tuol Sleng to warn future generations, and the former jailers, who cannot escape the horror of the genocide they helped create.

A number of images from Tuol Sleng are featured in the 1992 Ron Fricke film Baraka.

== See also ==
- Enemies of the People (film)
- Murambi Genocide Memorial Centre
