= Clandestine HUMINT and covert action =

National governments deal in both intelligence and military special operations functions

National governments deal in both intelligence and military special operations functions that either should be completely secret (i.e., clandestine: the existence of which is not known outside the relevant government circles), or simply cannot be linked to the sponsor (i.e., covert: it is known that sabotage is taking place, but its sponsor is unknown). It is a continuing and unsolved question for governments whether clandestine intelligence collection and covert action should be under the same agency. The arguments for doing so include having centralized functions for monitoring covert action and clandestine HUMINT and making sure they do not conflict, as well as avoiding duplication in common services such as cover identity support, counterespionage, and secret communications. The arguments against doing so suggest that the management of the two activities takes a quite different mindset and skills, in part because clandestine collection almost always is on a slower timeline than covert action.

== Historical background ==
During the Second World War, the United States Office of Strategic Services (OSS; the predecessor to the Central Intelligence Agency and to part of United States Army Special Forces) worked closely with the British Secret Intelligence Service (SIS), Special Operations Executive (SOE), and Political Warfare Executive (PWE). The latter two organizations were wartime, and their functions were merged back into SIS after the war.

The U.S. has generally followed the British model of a single civilian agency with close cooperation with military intelligence and military special operations forces. Many countries follow this model, but there are often calls to reorganize it, splitting off various functions into independent agencies. Historically, since the British clandestine intelligence, in recognizable form, goes back to the First World War, and their Second World War covert operations organization preceded U.S. entry into the war, it makes sense to present them first. There has always been a close relationship between the U.K. and U.S. organizations.

=== United Kingdom prewar operations ===
Prior to World War II, the British covert action function was in Section D of the Secret Intelligence Service (SIS). SIS also had the clandestine HUMINT responsibilities. Indeed, the United Kingdom had a recognizable HUMINT function, less formal than the 20th century versions, going back to Sir Francis Walsingham in 1583.

=== United States background ===
The American system tends to require more legal formalism than the British, so it became necessary to define "covert action". As a practical definition, covert action is something of which the target is aware, but either does not know, or cannot prove, who is influencing political, military, scientific, or economic factors in the target country. Plausible deniability is another way to say that the sponsor cannot be proven. Clandestine actions, in contrast, are actions of which the target remains unaware, such as espionage.

In the years immediately preceding the Second World War, the U.S. had no standing clandestine HUMINT or covert action organizations. There were certainly examples of both, such as Marine Major Earl Ellis' series of visits, in the 1920s, to Japanese islands in the Pacific. Ellis, who died under mysterious circumstances while on duty, created the basic plan for U.S. "island hopping" operations in the Pacific Theater of the Second World War.

Used wisely, a covert action, also called "special activities" in the military budget, can deliver a stronger message than diplomacy, while avoiding full-scale war. This was the original concept of George Kennan, which followed the Second World War and became the basic policy of the U.S. in 1947:

"Political warfare is the logical application of Clausewitz's doctrine in time of peace. In broadest definition, political warfare is the employment of all the means at a nation's command, short of war, to achieve its national objectives. Such operations are both overt and covert. They range from such overt actions as political alliances, economic measures ..., and "white" propaganda to such covert operations as clandestine support of "friendly" foreign elements, "black" psychological warfare and even encouragement of underground resistance in hostile states.
"Understanding the concept of political warfare, we should also recognize that there are two major types of political warfare--one overt and the other covert. Both, from their basic nature, should be directed and coordinated by the Department of State. Overt operations are, of course, the traditional policy activities of any foreign office enjoying positive leadership, whether or not they are recognized as political warfare. Covert operations are traditional in many European chancelleries but are relatively unfamiliar to this Government.
"Having assumed greater international responsibilities than ever before in our history and having been engaged by the full might of the Kremlin's political warfare, we cannot afford to leave unmobilized our resources for covert political warfare. We cannot afford in the future, in perhaps more serious political crises, to scramble into impromptu covert operations...

The principle of Kennan's proposal was regarded favorably by all of the agencies discussing it, but none wanted control due to the potential embarrassment of having an operation compromised. As the junior agency, CIA lost the bureaucratic fight, and received, In 1948 National Security Council Directive 10/2 formed, from some interim organizations, the Office of Policy Coordination, responsible for covert operations. The Office of Special Operations had been autonomously doing clandestine intelligence gathering, and, in 1952, Director of Central Intelligence Walter Bedell Smith joined the two to form the euphemistically named Directorate of Plans.

In the US more than in other countries, there is a continuing battle between military and intelligence organizations, with different oversight procedures, about who should control covert action. Far from being avoided as it was in 1948, organizations actively want authority over it.

Both among intelligence and special operations organizations, there are a variety of views of whether covert and clandestine activities should be in the same organization. Those that argue for complete separation tend to be from the clandestine side, and distrustful of the ability of covert action organizations to maintain the appropriate level of secrecy. On the other hand, there have been cases where covert and clandestine organizations, unaware of one another, approach the same target in different ways, with both failing due to interference. As an example, OSS attempted to steal or copy a codebook from the World War II Japanese embassy in Lisbon, Portugal. Their actions were discovered, and the Japanese changed the code. Unfortunately, the clandestine communications intelligence organization had broken the code and were routinely reading traffic in it. The OSS action required them to start all over again in cryptanalyzing the new system.

There is no consensus on whether it is, or is not, advisable to intermingle espionage and covert action organizations, even at the headquarters level. There is much more argument for doing so at headquarters, possibly not as one unit but with regular consultation. Certain services, such as name checks, communications, cover identities, and technical support may reasonably be combined, although the requirements of a particular field network should be held on a need-to-know basis.

If the OSS operatives in Lisbon had asked permission for their proposed operation against the Japanese, their operation would not have been approved. They might have guessed the reason, but would not have known. On the other hand, if headquarters approval is necessary for every action, some fleeting opportunities may be missed. Further, if the communications used to contact headquarters are compromised, the enemy could learn about all upcoming operations.

== Surging additional capability for the Second World War ==
During World War II, the Union of Soviet Socialist Republics, the United Kingdom, and the United States all formed ad hoc organizations for unconventional warfare (UW), psychological operations and direct action (DA) functions. Other countries, such as occupied France, formed related units under their governments in exile.

There was close cooperation between the US and UK special operations, counterintelligence, and deception organizations. Cooperation was less tight between the more sensitive clandestine intelligence gatherers.

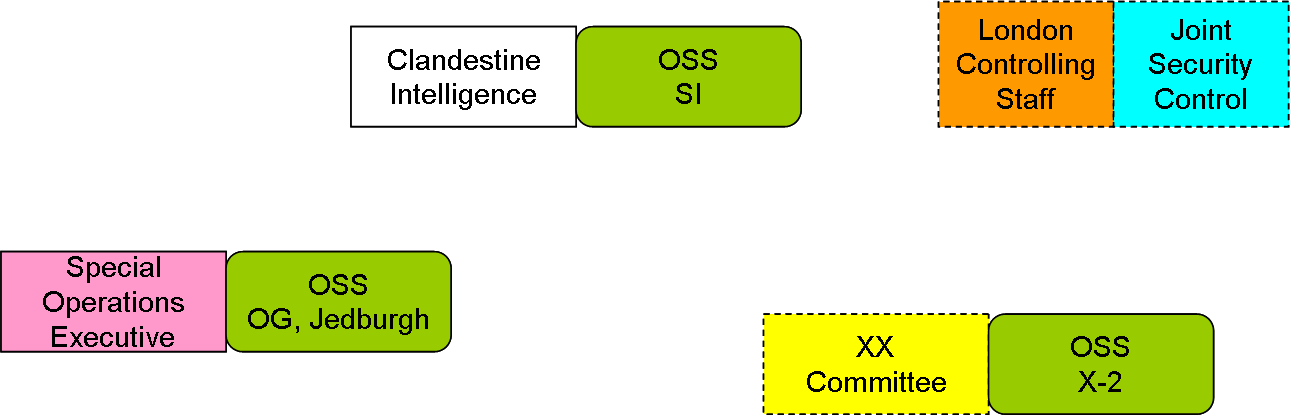
Rough US-UK wartime equivalents

None of these new organizations continued to function, in the same form, after World War II ended. Many of their personnel, techniques, and operations continued, but in reorganized form during official peace, and very real Cold War.

=== United Kingdom World War II Operations ===
The Ministry of Economic Warfare was a wartime operation responsible for UW/DA, economic warfare, and psychological operations. It contained the Special Operations Executive (SOE) and Political Warfare Executive. While Section D of SIS became the nucleus of SOE, in World War II, the British separated the unconventional warfare from SIS, putting it into SOE . It has been the conventional wisdom that this is the basic British doctrine, but, as with so many things in the clandestine and covert worlds, it is not that straightforward .

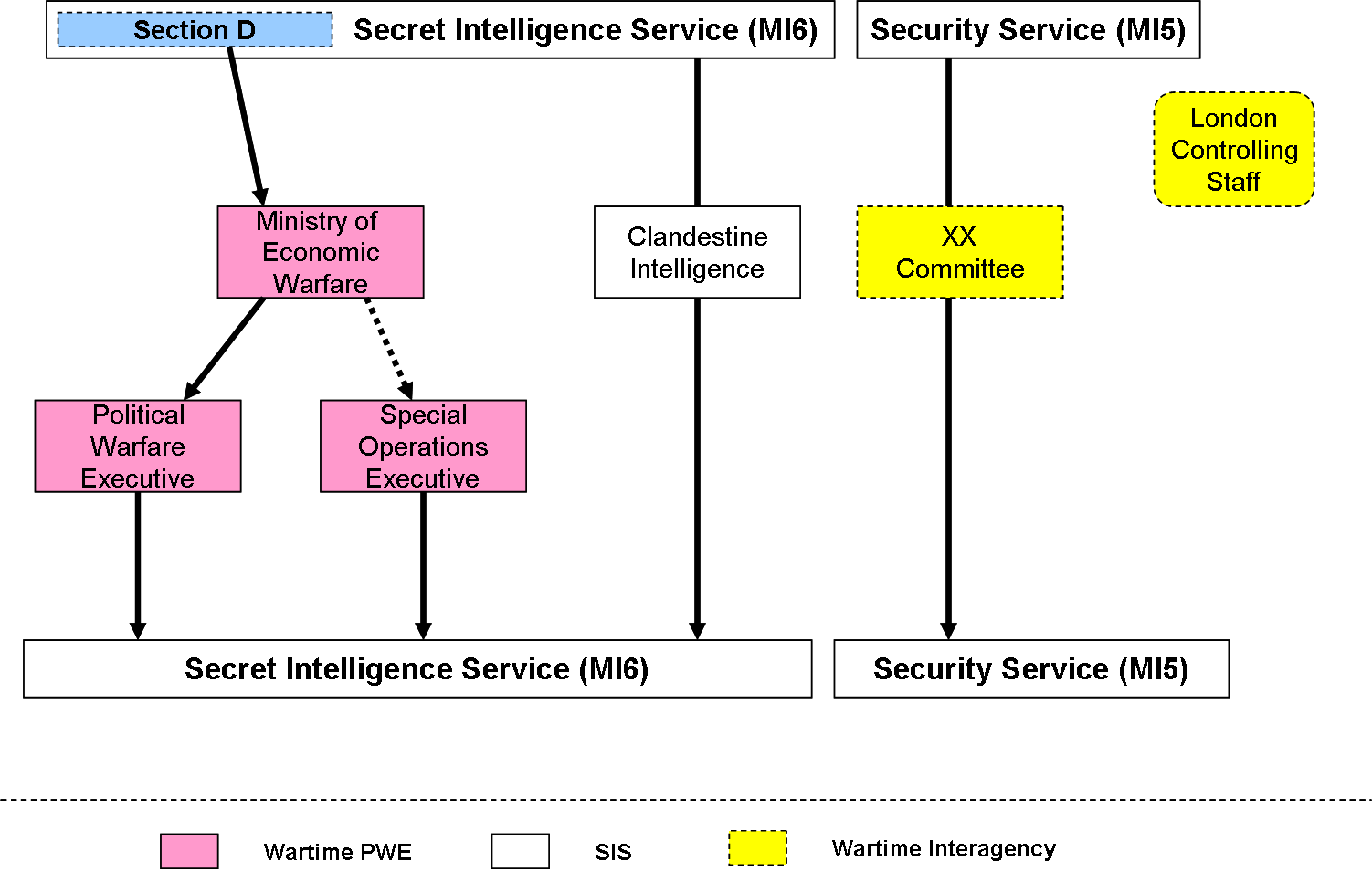
World War II wartime & permanent UK

SOE conducted competent training in parachuting, sabotage, irregular warfare, etc. It could check language and marksmanship skills, as well as examining clothing and personal effects for anything that could reveal British manufacture, SOE trained agents in the distinguishing uniforms, insignia, and decorations of the Germans, "But it could not teach them the organization, modus operandi, and psychology of the German intelligence and security services; and it did not call upon the MI-5 and MI-6 experts who did know the subject..." those services also were reluctant to provide SOE with access to their own sensitive sources. While isolating SOE from the clandestine services provided some mutual passive security, it also failed to provide proactive counterintelligence.

"The consequences of this shortcoming are evident in the German counterintelligence coups in France, Belgium, and Holland...While the Security Service maintained an extensive name index, the Registry (partially destroyed by German bombing, but otherwise irreplaceable), SOE apparently did not maintain a counterintelligence index against which prospective field recruits could be checked. SOE received help from the British police, but not the security experts.

"At the end of the war the Foreign Office and the Chiefs of Staff agreed to return the responsibility for covert operations to the jurisdiction of the Secret Intelligence Service. There were three reasons for the change: to ensure that secret intelligence and special operations were the responsibility of a single organization under a single authority; to prevent duplication, wasted effort, crossing of operational wires, friction, and consequent insecurity; and to tailor the size of the covert action staff to the greatly reduced scale of peacetime needs. The peacetime condition also added a new factor which greatly increased the importance of consolidation.

Before World War II, paramilitary and covert action capabilities were the responsibility of the variously named Organs of State Security.

=== United States World War II operations ===
Prior to World War II, the US had no standing paramilitary or espionage services. Missions were taken on a case-by-case basis, such as Major Earl Hancock Ellis' survey of potential Japanese bases in Micronesia .

During World War II, the US Office of Strategic Services contained both a secret intelligence (SI) (i.e., clandestine intelligence) and several covert operations branches, including operational groups (OG), maritime units, morale [psychological] operations and special operations (SO).

=== USSR World War II Operations ===
After Operation Barbarossa, Soviet Partisans arose spontaneously, from cut-off regular troops, and from ordinary citizens. Such a spontaneous uprising against an invader is accepted in international law, under the Third Geneva Convention.

A Central Command of the Partisan Movement formed, and various behind-the-lines groups were formed by the "Organs of State Security" and the Red Army. SMERSH was primarily under NKVD control but acted as military counterintelligence.

=== German World War II Operations ===
Nazi Germany had multiple and poorly coordinated organizations, not surprisingly given Adolf Hitler's tendency to duplicate functions and cause bureaucratic conflict, so he was the only person with the full picture. It was common to have a military, a Party, and a state organization with the same function, which was true, to a lesser extent, in the Soviet Union.

Military intelligence/counterintelligence, the Abwehr, ran some clandestine intelligence, but so did the Ausland (foreign) Sicherheitsdienst (SD), the intelligence service of the party organization, the Schutzstaffel (SS). The Venlo Incident was run by the Gestapo, an internal State organization. The direct action Brandenburgers started out as an Abwehr organization, but eventually reported to OKH, the Army high command.

== Separate functions during peacetime? ==
There is an enormous difference in DA/UW during an overt war and in peacetime. "The covert operations conducted during the war did not have to be unattributable. On the contrary; saboteurs, for example, in order to avoid precipitating reprisals on the local population, would leave behind evidence which tended to indicate that [external] agents were responsible. Security and secrecy were important, but only tactically important." It was important that the [enemy] should not know the identities and homes of the resistance workers, but it never mattered at all that the [enemy] should know that operations were directed from outside occupied territory (i.e., the operations were covert, not clandestine). Publicizing the external support, in fact, helped the underground in its recruiting.

=== UK postwar change ===
During peacetime, governments generally do not acknowledge clandestine activities, relying instead on techniques designed to maintain nonattributability. Executing a successful nonattributable operation requires background intelligence and experienced case officers to manage its complexity.

"Thus the SOE-SIS disharmony and its consequences led the British to a firm postwar conviction—that a single service should be responsible for all clandestine and covert activity undertaken by the nation."

"Although the British special operations organization was independent of MI6 from 1940 to the end of the war, MI6 had the responsibility for these operations before that period and has had it since, and second, that the record of the wartime SOE, although it scored some brilliant successes, was over all not such as to inspire emulation. Some of its most conspicuous failures are directly traceable to its separation from the Secret Intelligence Service (SIS or MI6) and the British Security Service (MI5)."

==== SOE abolished; partial reabsorption by SIS ====
While SOE was abolished after World War II, SIS, in 1946, absorbed selected SOE personnel and organizations, to form a new SIS section called the Directorate of War Planning (D/WP). D/WP had the SIS general charter for special operations, and liaison with UK and allied special operations forces. D/WP, however, was replaced, in 1953, by the Special Political Action Section (SPA), known as the "jolly fun tricks department", and operated until being shut down in the mid-seventies. SPA could call on SAS, outside contractors, or other UK military personnel.

==== UK Military Special Forces ====
It was at this stage that the relationship with the SAS, seconded and retired, as well as a number of 'private' specialist companies became ever more important and by 1987 a Special Forces Directorate was formed to coordinate the activities of the SAS and SBS and ensure closer collaboration with the SIS.

United Kingdom Special Forces (UKSF) was formed in 1987 to draw together the Army's Special Air Service (SAS) and the Special Boat Squadron Royal Marines (SBS), which was renamed the Special Boat Service at the same time, into a unified command, based around the former Director SAS who was given the additional title of Director Special Forces. The Directorate has been expanded by the creation of the Joint Special Forces Aviation Wing, the Special Reconnaissance Regiment and the Special Forces Support Group.

==== Current SIS paramilitary capabilities ====
Britain certainly uses military special operations forces directly, but, by 2003, they had a working relationship with SIS to assist the General Support Branch (GSB). GSB is a coordinating rather than an operational branch, which allows it to call upon 22 Special Air Service Regiment (especially its Counter-Revolutionary Wing), the RAF "S&D" flight, and M Troop (counter-terror) of the Special Boat Service (SBS).

RAF S&D pilots are qualified to fly special operations versions of the C-130 Hercules and Puma helicopter.

SIS can also call on the Special Reconnaissance Regiment, which absorbed 14 Intelligence Company as well as Intelligence Corps and Royal Military Police personnel, including female officers.

=== US postwar change ===
Immediately after World War II, a number of groups were broken up, and bureaucratically housed in an assortment of interim organizations. The OSS was broken up shortly after World War II, on September 20, 1945, with functions scattering into a series of interim organizations:

- OSS X-2 (counterintelligence) and Secret Intelligence (i.e., clandestine HUMINT) went into the Strategic Services Unit (SSU) of the (then) War Department. The covert action and black propaganda functions, however, split off in 1948.
- Paramilitary direct action (DA) and psychological operations were in a series of interim organizations, becoming the Office of Policy Coordination (OPC) in 1948.
- Research and Analysis went to the Department of State.

Even before the OPC split, the SSU was an organizational anomaly, since it reported to the Office of the Assistant Secretary of War, rather than G-2, the Intelligence Directorate of the Army Staff.

In January 1946, President Truman, who was concerned with "building up a Gestapo" and distrusted William Donovan, head of the OSS, created the Central Intelligence Group (CIG) which was the direct precursor to the CIA. The assets of the SSU, which now constituted a streamlined "nucleus" of clandestine intelligence was transferred to the CIG in mid-1946 and reconstituted as the Office of Special Operations (OSO).

==== CIA (1947) ====
The National Security Act of 1947 created the Central Intelligence Agency as the successor to the OSS and America's first peacetime intelligence agency.

The Act also merged the Department of War and the Department of the Navy into a single National Military Establishment, which was later renamed the Department of Defense in 1949. (OPC, however, remained outside the Department of Defense).

The Act also formalized several national security institutions, including the National Security Council (NSC), the modern Joint Chiefs of Staff, and the Office of Emergency Preparedness (OEP), the precursor to the Federal Emergency Management Agency (FEMA),

==== OPC, OSO and interim covert solutions 1948–1951 ====
U.S. covert psychological operations and paramilitary actions organizations, formerly in the OSS, went into a unit called the Office of Special Projects, and then renamed the Office of Policy Coordination (OPC) from the Central Intelligence Agency (CIA) until the two were merged in 1951. OPC was created in 1948 by the National Security Council under a document called NSC 10/2. The OPC's directors included representatives of the State and Defense departments and the CIA. It was largely administered and supplied by the Central Intelligence Agency .

While State and the intelligence community wanted to avoid covert operations, there was a quite different perspective among the Joint Chiefs of Staff. On 17 August 1948, JCS memorandum 1807/1 went to the Secretary of Defense. Its recommendations included:

- "The United States should provide itself with the organization and the means of supporting foreign resistance movements in guerrilla warfare to the advantage of United States national security during peace and war.
- "Guerrilla warfare should be supported under policy direction of NSC.
- "Agencies for conducting guerrilla warfare can be established by adding to the CIA's special operations functions the responsibility for supporting foreign resistance movements and by authorizing the Joint Chiefs of Staff to engage in the conduct of such operations. Primary interest in guerrilla warfare should be that of CIA in peacetime and [Department of Defense] in wartime.
- "A separate guerrilla warfare school and corps should not be established[emphasis added]. Instead, [Department of Defense], in coordination with State Department and CIA, should select personnel, give them necessary training in established Army schools, supplemented by courses in other military and State Department schools.

==== Korean War Paramilitary Operations ====
When the Korean War broke out in 1950, United States Army Special Forces were not yet operational. Paramilitary functions in Korea suffered from bureaucratic infighting between the Army's G-2 intelligence division, and CIA. A heavily redacted history of CIA operations in Korea indicates that the agency used US Far East Air Force resources, eventually designated "Flight B" of the Fifth Air Force. This unit provided air support for both military and CIA special operations. When CIA guerillas were attacked in 1951–1952, the air unit had to adapt frequently changing schedules. According to the CIA history, "The US Air Force-CIA relationship during the war was particularly profitable, close, and cordial."

Unconventional warfare, but not HUMINT, worked smoothly with the Army. Korea had been divided into CIA and Army regions, with the CIA in the extreme northeast, and the Army in the West.

In addition to its own resources, the Eighth US Army Korea (EUSAK) G-3 Operations Division had approximately 8,000 South Korean guerillas, who formed as a levée en masse. The Army guerillas, however, had no bases on the Korean mainland, and their island support bases were largely wiped out by 1952. CIA advisors worked with the Army guerillas between January and April 1952, and the history treats the relationship as cooperative.

During the Korean War, United Nations Partisan Forces Korea operated on islands and behind enemy lines. These forces were also known as the 8086th Army Unit, and then as the Far East Command Liaison Detachment, Korea, FECLD-K 8240th AU. These troops directed North Korea's partisans in raids, harassment of supply lines and the rescue of downed pilots. Since the initial Special Forces unit, 10 Special Forces Group (Airborne) was activated on 19 June 1952, but the Korean War broke out on June 25, 1950, Army Special Forces did not operate as a unit in that war. Experience gained in that war, however, influenced the development of Special Forces doctrine.

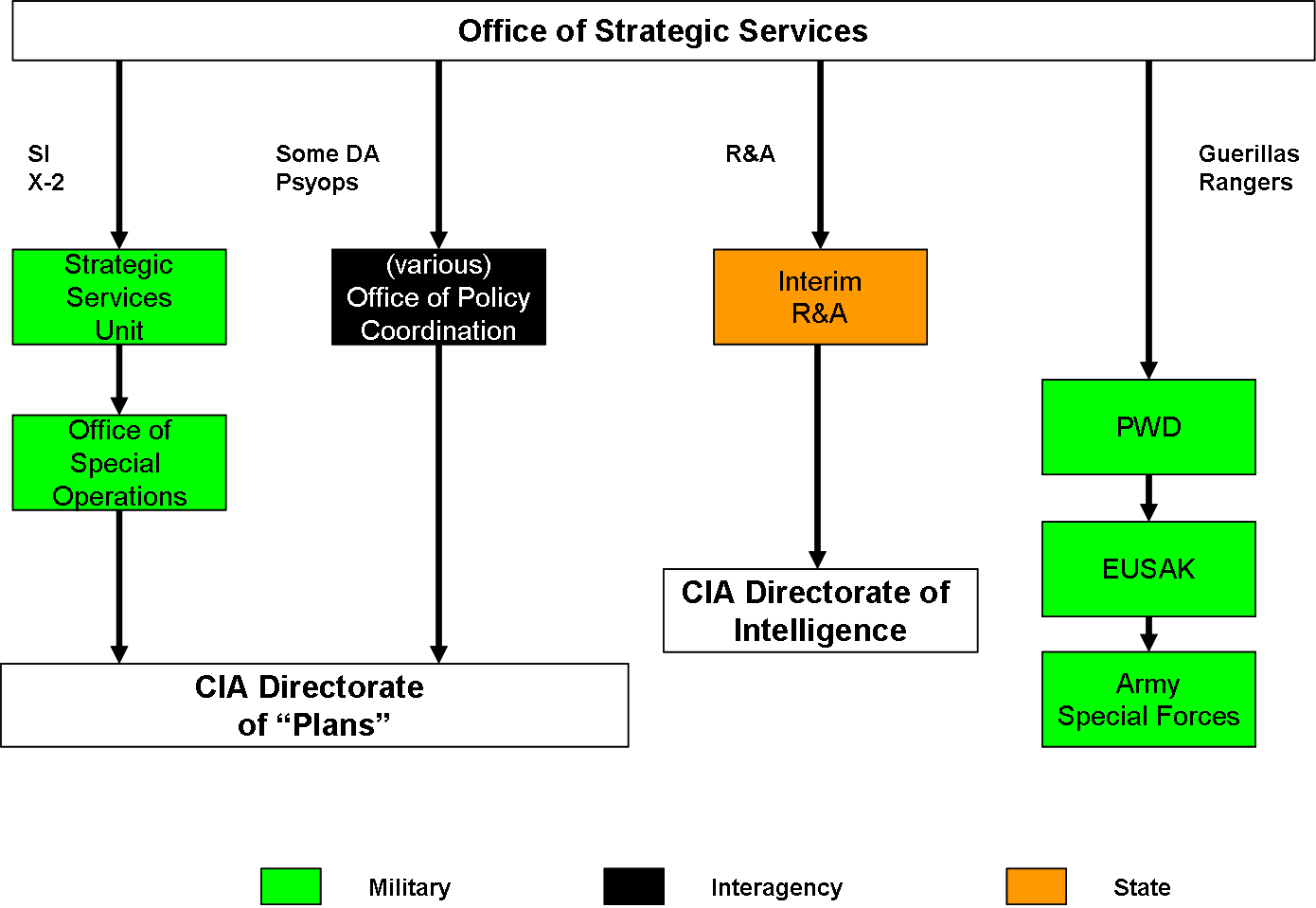
General US flow from wartime OSS to 1952

While General Charles A. Willoughby, intelligence officer (G-2) at Douglas MacArthur's headquarters asked CIA, in the absence of an Army HUMINT function, to establish special reconnaissance (SR) teams. This worked until the ceasefire talks began, but the CIA history speaks of severe conflict with G-2 over support resources and security. There was a continuing tension over CIA providing tactical support to EUSAK, and carrying out its national-level missions. The Army and CIA never worked out effective counterintelligence cooperation.

==== PWD and the Creation of US Army Special Forces ====
After World War II, the regular Army had a largesse of officers that had successfully run large UW operations, without any doctrine to guide them. The Army also had strong psychological operations capabilities, and a new Army Staff element was created to manage them.

During World War II, the Psychological Warfare Division (PWD) of the Supreme Headquarters Allied Expeditionary Force (SHAEF) was created to conduct overt psychological warfare against German troops in Europe. A joint UK-US organization, it was commanded by US Brigadier-General Robert A. McClure . McClure had commanded psychological operations in North Africa, again under the command of Dwight D. Eisenhower, and enjoyed his confidence. SHAEF PWD's staff came from the US Office of War Information (OWI), the US OSS, and the British PWE.

After the end of the war, the US Army created a PWD. While there had been pressure to put PWD under the newly revitalized Intelligence Division, McClure was strongly opposed.

"A great part of my difficulty in carrying out what I felt was my mission was with G-2. The G 2's all felt that they had a monopoly on intelligence and were reluctant in the earlier stages to give any of that intelligence to Psychological Warfare knowing that it would be broadcast or used in print.

There was also a sensitivity about providing intelligence to units working behind enemy lines and subject to capture. McClure believed that PWD either should report to Operations, or, as was eventually done, as a special staff for the Chief of Staff.

While McClure himself was a psychological operations specialist, his work with OSS had made him appreciative of UW. Since no other Army agency seemed interested in the UW mission, McClure was granted staff authority over UW, with a mission to:

"formulate and develop psychological warfare and special operations plans for the Army in consonance with established policy and to recommend policies for and supervise the execution of Department of the Army programs in these fields."

OPCW had three major divisions:

- Psychological Warfare
- Requirements
- Special Operations. The latter was particularly significant, because it formulated plans for creation of the US Army's first formal unconventional warfare capability: Special Forces.

McClure brought officers with World War II or Korean War experience in UW or long-range penetration, including COL Aaron Bank, LTC Russell Volckmann, and CPT Donald Blackburn. Bank had been assigned to the OSS and fought with the French Maquis. Volckmann and Blackburn had both been guerillas in the Philippines, and Volckman had also led UW in Korea. McClure saw one of his responsibilities as "selling" UW, in spite of resistance from the Army and CIA. He was able to recruit qualified personnel from the Ranger units that had been disbanded in Korea. With personnel spaces available from disbanding the Ranger companies in Korea, the Army activated Special Forces in early 1952.

Special Forces, both in their original form and as a component of the current United States Special Operations Command, have provided the nucleus of US paramilitary capabilities, both under direct military, CIA, and joint control. Some Special Forces personnel left the Army and went to work as CIA employees.

The US Special Forces was established out of several special operations units that were active during World War II. Formally, its lineage comes from the 1st Special Service Force (Devil's Brigade), but that unit was more a Special Reconnaissance (SR) and Direct Action (DA) command, which operated in uniform without augmentation by local soldiers.

Some of the Office of Strategic Services units have much more similarity, in mission, with the original Army Special Forces mission, Unconventional Warfare (UW), or acting as cadre to train and lead guerillas in occupied countries. The Special Forces motto, de oppresso liber (Latin: "To free from oppression") reflects this historical mission of guerilla warfare against an occupier. Specifically, the 3-man Operation Jedburgh units provided leadership to French Resistance units. The larger OSS Operational Groups (OG) were more associated with SR/DA missions, although they did work with Resistance units. COL Aaron Bank, commander of the first Special Forces group, served in OSS during World War II. Other OSS guerilla units included Detachment 101 in Burma, under the China-Burma-India Theater, which, among other missions, screened the larger Ranger unit, Merrill's Marauders

Douglas MacArthur did not want the OSS to operate in his South West Pacific theater of operations , so paramilitary operations there were at first ad hoc, formed by Filipinos, with Americans who refused to surrender. While Fil-American guerilla operations in the Japanese-occupied Philippines are not part of the direct lineage of Army Special Forces, some of the early Special Forces leadership were involved in advising and creating the modern organization.

US Army Special Forces (SF) are, along with psychological operations detachments and Rangers, the oldest of the post-World War II Army units in the current United States Special Operations Command (USSOCOM). Their original mission was to train and lead Unconventional Warfare (UW) forces, or a guerilla force in an occupied nation. 10th Special Forces Group was the first deployed unit, intended to operate UW forces behind enemy lines in the event of a Warsaw Pact invasion of Western Europe. As the US become involved in Southeast Asia, it was realized that specialists trained to lead guerillas also could help defend against hostile guerillas, so SF acquired the additional mission of Foreign Internal Defense (FID), working with Host Nation (HN) forces in a spectrum of counterguerilla activities from indirect support to combat command.

==== The Cold War CIA takes shape ====
In 1952, the OPC and OSO, along with assorted support offices, were merged to what was originally called the "Directorate of Plans", then, more honestly, the "Directorate of Operations." It has recently been reorganized into the National Clandestine Service.

== Controversies remain ==
While the US has consolidated clandestine operations, there is still an argument as to what level of covert operation should be under military control, especially in military theaters of operations. In the Kennedy Administration, National Security Action Memorandum 57 spoke to paramilitary operations, which can be clandestine only until there are survivors, or at least evidence, from combat operations following a study by an interagency committee, "the Department of Defense will normally receive responsibility for overt paramilitary operations. Where such an operation is to be wholly covert or disavowable, it may be assigned to CIA, provided that it is within the normal capabilities of the agency. Any large paramilitary operation wholly or partly covert which requires significant numbers of militarily trained personnel, amounts of military equipment which exceed normal CIA-controlled stocks and/or military experiences of a kind and level peculiar to the Armed Services is properly the primary responsibility of the Department of Defense with the CIA in a supporting role."

Before long, however, the CIA was training Cuban guerillas. Part of the reason the Bay of Pigs Invasion operation failed was disagreement between senior military people and the CIA paramilitary staff about what was necessary for an invasion to work; there were also pure political issues that helped doom it.

Things were a little clearer when the military was putting covert advisors into Laos and then Vietnam. The Military Assistance Command Vietnam Studies and Observation Group (MACV-SOG), commanded by a military officer with a CIA deputy, did conduct both covert DA missions and sometimes-clandestine SR, and tried but failed to put clandestine espionage/SR teams into North Vietnam . MACV-SOG had additional challenges, as it was only informally under the command of the MACV commander. Its real chain of command went to the Special Assistant for Counterinsurgency and Special Affairs (SACSA) in the Pentagon, and then to the Joint Chiefs of Staff, and either the National Security Council or less formal White House decisionmakers.

During the Nixon Administration, paramilitary operations were assumed to be assigned to the CIA unless the President ordered a different command structure, after review by the "Forty Committee" . Covert actions were defined not to include direct combat by the armed forces of the US, or cover & deception for the armed forces.

== Current operations ==
Different countries have different legal and political constraints on covert operations, and whether they are carried out by military special operations under military command (in or out of uniform), by military special operations personnel under the command of an intelligence agency, or by paramilitary personnel under intelligence command. The United Kingdom does have not a rigid a legal separation between the two, but also does not appear to have a major bureaucratic conflict between the intelligence community and military special operations. While the legalities also may not be as strict for Russia, there is a historical conflict among the security organizations and the military, and among different security agencies such as the FSB and OMON.

In the US, different oversight programs and legal authorities apply to operations under Department of Defense and intelligence community control.

=== US doctrine and operations ===
The US has consolidated espionage, as well as small paramilitary and information operations into the National Clandestine Service (NCS), formerly the CIA Directorate of Operations. More recently, the United States Department of Defense consolidated its global espionage assets into the Defense Clandestine Service (DCS) under the Defense Intelligence Agency (DIA). The CIA has some responsibility for direct action (DA) and unconventional warfare (UW), when such operations are of any appreciable size, are the responsibility of the military. NCS contains a Special Operations Group (SOG), with a strength of several hundred and concentrates on flexibility. It can take advantage of CIA relationships with foreign intelligence services, and is less regulated than the military.

Military organizations perform HUMINT that is directly related to their mission, such as local informants in a peacekeeping or occupation assignment. If a military unit obtains a HUMINT asset of national interest, the National Clandestine Service (NCS) or the Defense Clandestine Service (DCS) should oversee it. There may be special cases, especially related to USSOCOM, where they may run assets directly related to operations, but the national agencies are to be informed.

The CIA charter for "Support of Military Operations", however, is intended to avoid conflict. The reference cited preceded the formation of the NCS. Since USSOCOM and NCS often exchange personnel, especially in paramilitary operations, the conflict may be more theoretical than practical.

There is the potential for conflict between the NCS, DCS, and USSOCOM, especially the Joint Special Operations Command (JSOC), as well as an organization, originally called the Intelligence Support Activity (ISA). ISA changes its (classified) official name every two years and its code names approximately every 6 months.

The transference of covert operations from the CIA to the military has serious implications, which extend beyond whether the Secretary of Defense or the Director of National Intelligence is in charge. When the CIA undertakes a covert action, under the provision of the Hughes–Ryan Act, as amended by the Intelligence Oversight Act of 1980 that reduced the number of legislators that needed to be notified, that action must be justified by a presidential finding provided to Congress; however, there are no comparable procedures for approving military special operators on very similar missions.

=== Afghanistan and US doctrinal conflict ===
The early fighting in Afghanistan, with the defeat of regular Taliban forces by special operators with substantial air support, then-Secretary of Defense Donald Rumsfeld, known for a commitment to force transformation, was reported to be upset with the roles assigned to the CIA and to USSOCOM. The rule had been that military special operators "were not permitted to enter the country until the CIA had prepared the area for them in terms of contacts and landing sites.

"Rumsfeld viewed the dichotomization of the operation as an impediment to its rapidity and ultimate success. Further, he saw a potential for impairment to future operations. Therefore, Rumsfeld used the glittering success of SOFs in Afghanistan as persuasive evidence in his argument that SOFs could control their own missions. This was part of his greater plan to transform the military and, in effect, wrest control of covert operations away from the CIA without having to endure any corresponding intelligence oversight." emphasis added

=== Joint UK-US operations in Operation Desert Storm ===
GEN Norman Schwarzkopf, commanding the coalition forces in 1990–1991, was known as a critic of special operations forces. When the "Great SCUD Hunt" became a significant problem, the ranking British officer, LTG Peter de la Billière, sent SAS units into Iraq before conventional ground units had entered that country. De la Billiere had spent a good deal of his career in SAS and other British special operations units.

Under Israeli pressure to send its own SOF teams into western Iraq, and the realization that British SAS were already hunting Scuds, US Secretary of Defense Dick Cheney proposed using US SR teams as well as SAS . While Schwarzkopf was known to be a general opponent of SOF, Cheney approved the use of US SOF to hunt for the launchers. On February 7, US SR teams joined British teams in the hunt for mobile Scud launchers .

Open sources contain relatively little operational information about U.S. SOF activities in western Iraq. Some basic elements have emerged, however. Operating at night, Air Force MH-53J Pave Low and Army MH-47E helicopters would ferry SOF ground teams and their specially equipped four-wheel-drive vehicles from bases in Saudi Arabia to Iraq . The SOF personnel would patrol during the night and hide during the day. When targets were discovered, Air Force Special Operations Combat Controllers accompanying the ground forces would communicate over secure radios to AWACS battle staff, who would direct attack aircraft against the targets.

=== Russian operations ===
Recent Russian doctrine can only be inferred from Soviet practice, unconventional warfare, and some special reconnaissance, seems to be subordinated to major military commands. Spetsnaz special operations forces are under the GRU, although units are attached to major commands.

=== Israeli operations ===
Israel has both clandestine collection and some covert action in the Mossad, although their larger paramilitary operations are assigned to what they call "reconnaissance units", the premier one being Sayeret Matkal.

To retaliate for the Munich massacre at the 1972 Summer Olympics, Mossad set up Mossad assassinations following the Munich massacre, to assassinate militants believed responsible. For some time, the operation was successful, although eventually killed an innocent individual who had been incorrectly identified; see the Lillehammer affair.

=== French operations ===
The Directorate-General for External Security (DGSE) is responsible for intelligence analysis and clandestine collection, but also has an operations division and an action service within it, the Division Action. The Sinking of the Rainbow Warrior, a covert action against Greenpeace, was an example of no service being perfect.

Note that the French worked closely with Operation Jedburgh during World War II. Some 3-man Jedburgh teams had a French, US, and UK member.
