= CIA activities in Cambodia =

American intelligence agency activities in Cambodia

The Central Intelligence Agency of the United States conducted secret operations in Cambodia and in Laos for eight years as part of the conflict against Communist North Vietnam.

== 1954 ==
The National Intelligence Estimate projected relatively little Communist activity in Cambodia as Viet Minh withdraw. With outside help, the Cambodians should be able to build a security apparatus.

== 1959 ==
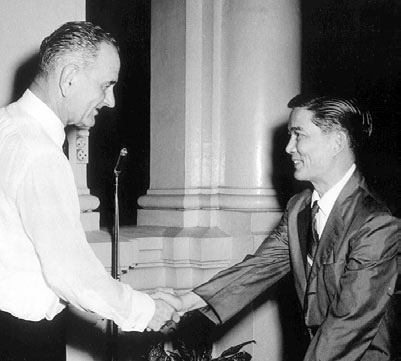
Ngo Dinh Nhu meeting US Vice-President Lyndon Johnson in 1961

In December 1958 Ngo Dinh Nhu – Ngo Dinh Diem's younger brother and chief adviser – broached the idea of orchestrating a coup to overthrow Cambodian leader Norodom Sihanouk. Nhu contacted Dap Chhuon, Sihanouk's Interior Minister, who was known for his pro-American sympathies, to prepare for the coup against his boss. Chhuon received covert financial and military assistance from Thailand, South Vietnam, and the CIA. In January 1959 Sihanouk learned of the coup plans through intermediaries who were in contact with Chhuon. The following month, Sihanouk sent the army to capture Chhuon, who was summarily executed as soon as he was captured, effectively ending the coup attempt. Sihanouk then accused South Vietnam and the U.S. of orchestrating the coup attempt. Six months later, on 31 August 1959, a small packaged lacquer gift, which was fitted with a parcel bomb, was delivered to the royal palace. Norodom Vakrivan, the chief of protocol, was killed instantly when he opened the package. Sihanouk's parents, Suramarit and Kossamak, who were sitting in another room not far from Vakrivan, narrowly escaped unscathed. An investigation traced the origin of the parcel bomb to an American military base in Saigon. While Sihanouk publicly accused Ngo Dinh Nhu of masterminding the bomb attack, he secretly suspected that the U.S. was also involved. The incident deepened his distrust of the U.S.

== 1969 ==
President Richard Nixon asked Assistant to the President for National Security Affairs Henry A. Kissinger to explore two potential CIA actions in Cambodia:

1. Creating covert paramilitary harassing operations directed against North Vietnamese Regular Forces in the sanctuary areas just over the Cambodian border
2. CIA capability for eliminating or reducing the arms traffic through Cambodia to communist forces in South Vietnam.

After discussion in the 303 Committee, which was then the approval group for US covert actions, the committee endorsed the first, although the CIA recommended against it for two reasons. They believed it would take effort away from operations in South Vietnam, and also would have questionable effectiveness but high cost against the large North Vietnamese forces in Cambodia.

As far as the second, CIA has identified a number of Cambodian army officers who are actively involved in supporting communist forces in South Vietnam, but does not now have direct, secure and controlled access to any of these officers. They doubt any of the officers involved in the arms traffic would be now susceptible to bribery both because of the profits accruing to them from such operations as well as the personal political risks entailed in a relationship involving the United States. Further, they pointed out that if recent U.S. diplomatic approaches to Cambodia result in the formal resumption of full diplomatic relations, CIA will gain an operating base for improved intelligence collection and covert action. With such a base, they would have a better chance to convince Prince Sihanouk that it is in his best interest to make an honest effort to reduce or halt the arms traffic.

Kissinger recommended continuing to monitor rather than taking action. There is no record on file of a Presidential decision on these matters.

== 1969 ==
A February 19 memorandum from Assistant to the President for National Security Affairs Henry Kissinger to President Richard Nixon proposed a bombing attack by B-52 aircraft against what was believed to be COSVN in Cambodia. In this discussion, specific CIA analysis was not discussed, but Kissinger indicated that he believed the target information to be correct:

On February 18, 1969, Mr. H.A. Kissinger, Secretary of Defense Laird, Deputy Secretary of Defense Packard, Chairman of the Joint Chiefs of Staff, General Wheeler, and Colonels Pursley and Haig met in the Secretary of Defense’s conference room and were briefed by a two-officer team from Saigon on the conduct of the proposed Arc Light strike against the reported location of COSVN Headquarters.

Note that no intelligence personnel were present.

At an 11 October 1969 meeting with Nixon, Kissinger, United States Secretary of Defense Melvin Laird, Attorney General John Mitchell and the Joint Chiefs of Staff (i.e., no CIA personnel), several pertinent observations were made.

Chairman of the Joint Chiefs of Staff (CJCS) Earle Wheeler cited two COSVN Resolutions, with the inference that COSVN existed as an organizational entity. In the subsequent discussion of bombing options, there were no mention of COSVN's physical location.

== 1970 ==
Prince Norodom Sihanouk was ousted by Lon Nol in March 1970. Sihanouk claimed in his 1973 book that the CIA engineered the coup. The overthrow followed Cambodia's constitutional process following a vote of no confidence in the country's National Assembly and most accounts emphasize the primacy of Cambodian actors in Sihanouk's removal. Historians are divided about the extent of U.S. involvement in or foreknowledge of the ouster, but an emerging consensus posits some culpability on the part of U.S. military intelligence. However, according to Ben Kiernan, "There is in fact no evidence of CIA involvement in the 1970 events".

== 1972 ==
Senator Clifford P. Case sponsored a law effective December 1972 cutting off funds for CIA and private military company operations in Cambodia (see the Case–Church Amendment).

== 1980s ==
In December 1978, Vietnam invaded Cambodia and overthrew the genocidal Khmer Rouge regime, ending the Cambodian genocide and installing a new government led by Khmer Rouge defectors. The Reagan administration authorized the provision of aid to a coalition called the Khmer People's National Liberation Front (KPNLF), run by Son Sann as well as the royalists loyal to Norodom Sihanouk. According to sources within the CIA in 1985, the agency had been "covertly providing millions of dollars a year since 1982 for nonmilitary purposes to two noncommunist Cambodian resistance groups, including more than $5 million this year." This aid was then "funneled through Thailand" in the hopes of strengthening "the two noncommunist resistance groups' position in their loose coalition with the communist Khmer Rouge." However, these sources acknowledged that it was a "long shot" that the noncommunist resistance would overtake the Khmer Rouge, which was by far the strongest of the three anti-Vietnamese resistance groups, stating that "of course, if the coalition wins, the Khmer Rouge will eat the others alive."

While the United States government stated that it only provided aid to the forces loyal to Son Sann and Norodom Sihanouk, a leaked correspondence between Jonathan Winer, counsel to Senator John Kerry, and Larry Chartienes of the Vietnam Veterans of America claimed that the United States had provided $85 million in aid to the Khmer Rouge between 1980 and 1986. A declassified CIA letter in response described the allegations as "without basis in fact". It also condemned the Khmer Rouge for its brutality and said the US had no contact with the group. According to John Pilger, the Reagan administration attempted to deny any links between the CIA and the Khmer Rouge by using Thailand and Singapore as middlemen for logistical support and as a conduit for delivering weapons to the Khmer Rouge, respectively, in violation of a 1989 congressional law that explicitly banned aid to the Pol Pot forces. The CIA also attempted to deflect responsibility by shifting the burden of covert support to the British SAS. A senior SAS officer testified that "We first went to Thailand in 1984...The Yanks and us work together; we're close, like brothers. They didn't like it any more than we did. We trained the Khmer Rouge in a lot of technical stuff."

In 1989, Vietnamese forces were withdrawn from Cambodia, after having successfully quelled the uprising by Khmer Rouge and KPNLF insurgents.

== See also ==
- CIA activities in Laos
- Hughes–Ryan Amendment
- Allegations of United States support for the Khmer Rouge
