= Richard Holm =

Richard Holm may refer to:

- Dick Holm, American CIA operations officer
- Richard Holm (tenor) (1912–1988), German operatic tenor
- Richard H. Holm (born 1933), American inorganic chemist
