= Presidential finding =

In the United States, a presidential finding, (Note: The term presidential finding also has an earlier usage from the Agricultural Trade Development and Assistance Act of 1954, in which the findings indicated that certain conditions of that act had been satisfied and, therefore, sales of agricultural commodities could proceed. Such findings were published in the Federal Register and the CFR Title 3 compilations. This article only encompasses the modern usage.) more formally known as a memorandum of notification (MON), is a presidential directive required by statute to be delivered to certain Congressional committees to justify the commencement of covert operations by the Central Intelligence Agency (CIA).

== History ==
Current use of the presidential finding stems from the so-called Hughes–Ryan Amendment to the Foreign Assistance Act of 1974, which prohibited the expenditure of appropriated funds by or on behalf of the CIA for intelligence activities "unless and until the President finds that each such operation is important to the national security of the United States and reports, in a timely fashion, a description and scope of such operation to the appropriate committees of Congress" (section 662). This was intended to ensure that clear responsibility for such action was attributable to the President and that Congress was always made aware of such activities. Due to the sensitivity of their content, presidential findings are almost always classified.

The most recent change to exercise of findings occurred in the Intelligence Authorization Act of 1991, which introduced increased flexibility in the reporting requirement: findings are to be "reported to the intelligence committees as soon as possible" after being approved "and before the initiation of the covert action authorized by the finding." As such, presidential findings are one of the primary means through which the intelligence committees exercise their oversight of the government's intelligence operations. However, the Intelligence Authorization Act allows the President to proceed without notifying Congress if he notifies them afterwards "in a timely fashion."

== Application ==
According to the BBC, presidential findings have been used by most administrations since 1974. They include:

- Jimmy Carter allowing the CIA to deliver rocket-propelled grenades to guerrillas fighting the Soviet invasion of Afghanistan (see Charlie Wilson)
- Ronald Reagan allowing the CIA to arm the Contras in their battle against the leftist Nicaraguan government (See Iran–Contra affair)
- George Bush for operations against al-Qaeda after the 9/11 attacks
- Barack Obama for Operation Timber Sycamore, which permitted a CIA-run operation to train and supply Syrian rebels opposed to Bashar al-Assad
- Donald Trump's authorization for the CIA to conduct airstrikes against drug-runners in the Caribbean Sea.

CNN reported in 2011 that presidential findings were also used to:

- authorize the CIA to conduct operations in Libya in support of U.S. policy there;
- authorize initial US forays into Afghanistan following the 9-11 attacks.

== Sources ==
- Relyea, Harold C. (26 November 2008). "Presidential Directives: Background and Overview" (PDF). Congressional Research Service. Order Code 98-611 GOV.
