= Allegations of United States support for the Khmer Rouge =

The flag of Democratic Kampuchea, whose design was used by Khmer guerrillas

The United States (U.S.) voted for the Khmer Rouge and the Khmer Rouge-dominated Coalition Government of Democratic Kampuchea (CGDK) to retain Cambodia's United Nations (UN) seat until as late as 1993, long after the Khmer Rouge had been mostly deposed by Vietnam during the 1979 Vietnamese invasion of Cambodia and ruled just a small part of the country. It has also been reported that the U.S. encouraged the government of China to provide military support for the Khmer Rouge, a claim which was denied by Zbigniew Brzezinski. There have also been related allegations by several sources, notably Michael Haas, which claim that the U.S. directly armed the Khmer Rouge in order to weaken the influence of Vietnam and the Soviet Union in Southeast Asia. These allegations have been disputed by the U.S. government and by journalist Nate Thayer, who argued that little, if any, American aid actually reached the Khmer Rouge. Academic scholar Peter Maguire writes that the U.S. "gave $85 million to the Khmer Rouge between 1980 and 1986," roughly half of which occurred "during the crucial years of 1979 and 1980".

== Background ==
=== Khmer Rouge in power ===
The Khmer Rouge, the communist party led by Pol Pot, came to power in 1975 during the Cambodian Civil War, which was linked to the Vietnam War. They defeated the Khmer Republic, who were heavily supported by the U.S., including a massive bombing campaign against the Khmer Rouge until 1973. North Vietnam, who had many soldiers in Cambodia, and China were the primary backers of the Khmer Rouge during the civil war. Between 1975 and 1979, the Khmer Rouge perpetrated the Cambodian genocide, which killed between 1.5 and 2 million people, nearly 25% of Cambodia's population. During the genocide, China was the main international patron of the Khmer Rouge, supplying "more than 15,000 military advisers" and most of its external aid.

=== Vietnamese invasion ===
Vietnam invaded Cambodia in late 1978 and established the People's Republic of Kampuchea (PRK) led by Khmer Rouge defectors. Vietnam's invasion was motivated by repeated cross-border attacks by the Khmer Rouge that targeted Vietnamese civilians, including the Ba Chúc massacre—in which the Khmer Rouge systematically killed the entire population of a Vietnamese village of over 3,000 people, with the exception of one woman who survived being shot in the neck and clubbed, causing her to suffer painful headaches for the rest of her life; before being killed, many of the victims were "barbarously tortured". These attacks killed over 30,000 Vietnamese in total.

Vietnam ousted the Khmer Rouge and ended the genocide in a mere 17 days, and Vietnamese troops occupied Cambodia for the next eleven years. Following the invasion, Vietnam attempted to publicize the crimes of the Khmer Rouge, establishing an ossuary for the victims at Ba Chúc and convincing the PRK to do the same for the Khmer Rouge's Cambodian victims; the Khmer Rouge's most notorious prison, S-21—which held 20,000 prisoners, "all but seven" of whom were killed—was revealed in May 1979 and eventually turned into the Tuol Sleng Genocide Museum, although there were well over 150 Khmer Rouge death camps "on the same model, at least one per district".

To punish Vietnam for overthrowing the Khmer Rouge, China invaded Vietnam in February 1979, while the United States (U.S.) "merely slapped more sanctions on Vietnam" and "blocked loans from the International Monetary Fund [(IMF)] to Vietnam".

After the 1991 Paris Peace Accords, Thailand continued to allow the Khmer Rouge "to trade and move across the Thai border to sustain their activities [...] although international criticism, particularly from the U.S. and Australia [...] caused it to disavow passing any direct military support".

=== Cambodia's UN seat ===
As a result of Chinese and Western opposition to the Vietnamese invasion and occupation of Cambodia, the Khmer Rouge, rather than the PRK, was allowed to hold Cambodia's United Nations (UN) seat until 1982. After 1982, the UN seat was filled by a Khmer Rouge-dominated coalition—the Coalition Government of Democratic Kampuchea (CGDK). Owing to Chinese, U.S., and Western support, the Khmer Rouge-dominated CGDK held Cambodia's UN seat until 1993.

== U.S. diplomatic support ==
According to journalist Elizabeth Becker, former U.S. National Security Advisor (NSA) Zbigniew Brzezinski "claims that he concocted the idea of persuading Thailand to cooperate fully with China in its efforts to rebuild the Khmer Rouge. In the spring of 1979, Brzezinski says, he used the visit of Thailand's foreign minister to press forward his plans." In 1998, in an open letter to The New York Times, Brzezinski stated: "The Chinese were aiding Pol Pot, but without any help or arrangement from the United States. Moreover, we told the Chinese explicitly that in our view Pol Pot was an abomination and that the United States would have nothing to do with him—directly or indirectly." However, in 1980 Brzezinski said that "I encouraged the Chinese to support Pol Pot. I encouraged the Thai to help the [Khmer Rouge] [...] we could never support [Pol Pot] but China could." In Brzezinski's obituary published in The New York Times after his death in 2017, he was described as "tacitly encouraging" China's backing of the Khmer Rouge. China trained Khmer Rouge soldiers on its soil during 1979–1986 (if not later), "stationed military advisers with Khmer Rouge troops as late as 1990", and "supplied at least $1 billion in military aid" during the 1980s.

In November 1975, U.S. National Security Advisor and Secretary of State Henry Kissinger told the Thai foreign minister: "You should tell the Cambodians that we will be friends with them. They are murderous thugs but we won't let that stand in our way." In a 1998 interview, Kissinger said: "some countries, the Chinese in particular supported Pol Pot as a counterweight to the Vietnamese supported people and We at least tolerated it." Kissinger said he didn't approve of this due to the genocide and said he "would not have dealt with Pol Pot for any purpose whatsoever." He further said: "The Thais and the Chinese did not want a Vietnamese-dominated Indochina. We didn't want the Vietnamese to dominate. I don't believe we did anything for Pol Pot. But I suspect we closed our eyes when some others did something for Pol Pot."

Cambodian leader Norodom Sihanouk, when asked about charges of opportunism in May 1987 ("your critics would say [...] that you would sleep with the Devil to achieve your end"), replied: "As far as devils are concerned, the U.S.A. also supports the Khmer Rouge. Even before the forming of the Coalition Government in 1982, the U.S. each year voted in favor of the Khmer Rouge regime. [...] The U.S.A. says that it is against the Khmer Rouge, that it is pro-Sihanouk, pro-Son Sann. But the devils, they are there [laughs] with Sihanouk and Son Sann."

== Allegations of U.S. military support ==
According to Tom Fawthrop, U.S. support for the Khmer Rouge guerrillas in the 1980s was "pivotal" to keeping the organization alive, and was in part motivated by revenge over the U.S. defeat during the Vietnam War. A WikiLeaks dump of 500,000 U.S. diplomatic cables from 1978 shows that the administration of President Jimmy Carter was torn between revulsion at the atrocities of the Khmer Rouge and concern with the possibility of growing Vietnamese influence should the Khmer Rouge collapse.

According to Michael Haas, despite publicly condemning the Khmer Rouge, the U.S. offered military support to the organization and was instrumental in preventing UN recognition of the Vietnam-aligned government. Haas argued that the U.S. and China responded to efforts from the Association of South East Asian Nations (ASEAN) for disarming the Khmer Rouge by ensuring the Khmer Rouge stayed armed, and that U.S. efforts for merging the Khmer Rouge with allied factions resulted in the formation of the CGDK. After 1982, the U.S. increased its annual covert aid to the Cambodian resistance from $4 million to $10 million. Haas's account is corroborated by Singaporean diplomat Bilahari Kausikan, who recalled: "ASEAN wanted elections but the U.S. supported the return of a genocidal regime. Did any of you imagine that the U.S. once had in effect supported genocide?" Kausikan described the disagreement between the U.S. and ASEAN over the Khmer Rouge as reaching the threshold that the U.S. threatened Singapore with "blood on the floor".

Academic scholar Peter Maguire writes that the U.S. "gave $85 million to the Khmer Rouge between 1980 and 1986," roughly half of which occurred "during the crucial years of 1979 and 1980".

By contrast, Nate Thayer recounted that "The United States has scrupulously avoided any direct involvement in aiding the Khmer Rouge", instead providing non-lethal aid to the non-communist Khmer People's National Liberation Front (KPNLF) and Armee Nationale Sihanouk (ANS) insurgents, which rarely cooperated with the Khmer Rouge on the battlefield, despite being coalition partners, and which fought with the Khmer Rouge dozens of times prior to 1987. According to Thayer, "In months spent in areas controlled by the three resistance groups and during scores of encounters with the Khmer Rouge [...] I never once encountered aid given to the [non-communist resistance] in use by or in possession of the Khmer Rouge."

== State Department investigation ==
Although U.S. policy was to provide support to "15,000 ineffective 'noncommunist' rebel fighters", Joel Brinkley stated that "charges made the rounds that some of the American aid, $215 million so far, was finding its way to the Khmer Rouge". A subsequent investigation led by Thomas Fingar of the State Department's Bureau of Intelligence and Research (INR) "found some leakage—including sharing of ammunition, joint defense of a bridge, and using one truck to transport both 'noncommunist' and Khmer Rouge fighters to a fight." Fingar was dismissive of his own investigators' report, which he characterized as an "epiphenomenon in a flea circus": "Isn't the larger objective here defeating the Vietnamese puppets in Phnom Penh?"

== See also ==
- Bangkok Plot
- Cambodia–China relations
- Cambodia–United States relations
- Cambodian coup of 1970
- Cambodian genocide denial
- CIA activities in Cambodia
- Operation Freedom Deal
- Operation Menu
