= Hughes–Ryan Amendment =

United States Law

The Hughes–Ryan Amendment (Public Law 93–559 (1974)) was an amendment to the Foreign Assistance Act of 1961, passed as section 32 of the Foreign Assistance Act of 1974. The amendment was named for its co-authors, Senator Harold E. Hughes (D–IA) and Representative Leo Ryan (D–CA). The amendment required the President of the United States to report all covert actions of the Central Intelligence Agency (CIA) to one or more Congressional committees.

This amendment addressed the question of CIA and Defense Department covert actions, and prohibited the use of appropriated funds for the conduct of such an action unless and until the President issues an official "Finding" that each such operation is important to national security, and submits this Finding to the appropriate Congressional committees (a total of six committees, at the time, which grew to eight committees after the House and Senate "select committees" on intelligence were established).

The legislation was meant to ensure that the intelligence oversight committees within Congress were told of CIA actions within a reasonable time limit. Senator Hughes, in introducing the legislation in 1973, also saw it as a means of limiting major covert operations by military, intelligence, and national security agents conducted without the full knowledge of the president.

== History ==
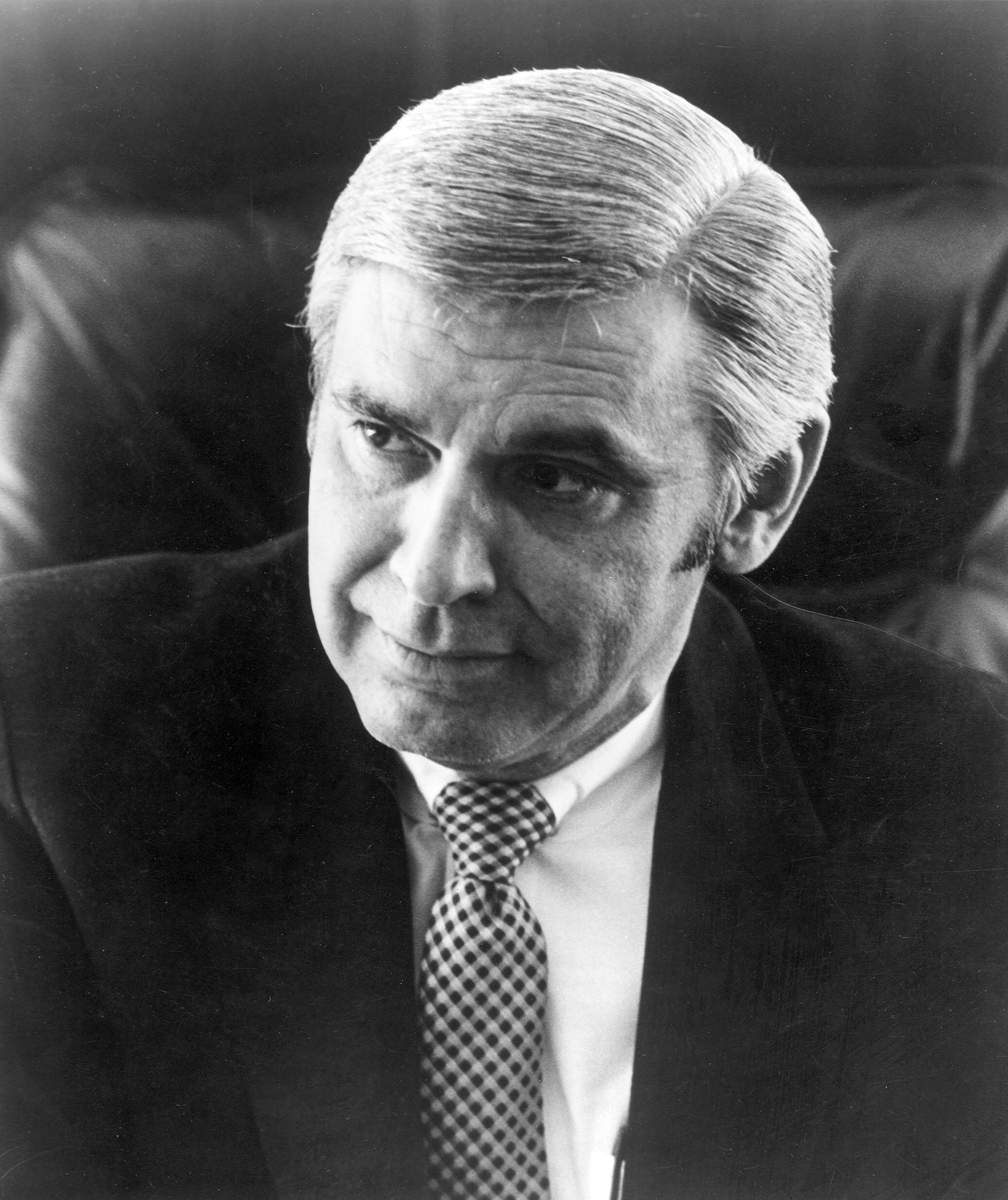
Congressman Leo Ryan

By the early years of the 1970s, the unpopular war in Southeast Asia and the unfolding Watergate scandal brought the era of minimal oversight to a halt. The Congress was determined to rein in the Nixon administration, and to ascertain the extent to which the nation's intelligence agencies had been involved in questionable, if not outright illegal, activities. A major stimulus for the amendment came from 1972 and 1973 hearings of the Senate Armed Services Committee on covert military operations in Cambodia, Laos, and North Vietnam in the early 1970s. The committee had found that Air Force and Navy air elements had conducted secret air strikes, and falsified after-action reports to conceal this. To Hughes and several other senators, these activities represented a secret war conducted through back-channel communications from the White House directly to field commanders in the Pacific Theater and the Vietnam War.

A series of troubling revelations appeared in the press concerning intelligence activities. On 22 December 1974, The New York Times published a lengthy article by Seymour Hersh detailing CIA operations that had been dubbed the "family jewels", including lengthy covert action programs to assassinate foreign leaders and subvert foreign governments. The article also discussed efforts by intelligence agencies to collect information on the political activities of American citizens. These revelations convinced many senators and representatives that the Congress had been too lax, trusting, and naive in carrying out its oversight responsibilities.

The first legislative response was enactment, in 1974, of the Hughes–Ryan Amendment to the Foreign Assistance Act of 1961. The act, as amended, established ultimate accountability of the President for all covert action conducted by the CIA, removing any "plausible deniability" for the President regarding exposed covert actions. It also expanded the circle of "witting" persons in Congress, which made covert operations to which Congress was opposed much more likely to be exposed by leaks. Thus, the passage of the amendment created both de facto and de jure Congressional veto power on covert operations, through the ability to leak and the power of the purse, respectively.

== See also ==
- Boland Amendment
- Case–Church Amendment
- Church Committee
- CIA activities in Cambodia
- CIA activities in Laos
- Clark Amendment
- Foreign Assistance Act of 1974
- Intelligence Oversight Act (1980)
- Military Assistance Command, Vietnam – Studies and Observations Group
- Pike Committee
