= Foreign Assistance Act of 1974 =

1974 United States foreign assistance law

- Other short titles: Foreign Assistance Act Amendments of 1974
- Long title: An Act to amend the Foreign Assistance Act of 1961, and for other purposes.
- Enacted by: the 93rd United States Congress
- Effective: December 30, 1974

Citations
- Public law: 93-559
- Statutes at Large: 88 Stat. 1795

Codification
- Acts amended: Foreign Assistance Act of 1961
- Titles amended: 22 U.S.C.: Foreign Relations and Intercourse
- U.S.C. sections amended: 22 U.S.C. ch. 32 § 2151

Legislative history
- Introduced in the Senate as S. 3394 by John Sparkman (D–AL) on April 29, 1974; Committee consideration by Senate Foreign Relations; Passed the Senate on December 4, 1974 (46–45); Passed the House on December 11, 1974 (201–189, in lieu of H.R. 17234); Reported by the joint conference committee on December 17, 1974; agreed to by the Senate on December 17, 1974 (49–43) and by the House on December 18, 1974 (209–189); Signed into law by President Gerald R. Ford on December 30, 1974

The Foreign Assistance Act of 1974 (Pub. L. 93–559) was a United States federal law that amended the Foreign Assistance Act of 1961 and authorized U.S. foreign assistance programs for fiscal year 1975. Enacted on December 30, 1974, the Act increased and reallocated authorizations for development assistance, security assistance, and postwar relief, and added new program authorities and reporting requirements.

The 1974 amendments are particularly noted for (1) introducing an explicit human rights standard for U.S. security assistance through a new section 502B of the 1961 Act, (2) placing detailed ceilings and conditions on assistance for South Vietnam, Cambodia, and Laos, (3) authorizing large economic and military aid packages to Israel, Egypt and Jordan in the context of post–Yom Kippur War diplomacy, and (4) suspending most military assistance and arms transfers to Turkey following the Turkish invasion of Cyprus.

The Act also contained the Hughes–Ryan Amendment, which for the first time required the president to make a formal finding that each covert action undertaken by the CIA was important to U.S. national security and to report those operations in a timely manner to designated committees of Congress, thereby providing a statutory basis for regular congressional oversight of covert action.

== Background ==
In the early 1970s, Congress moved to reassert its role in U.S. foreign policy in the wake of the Vietnam War and the Watergate scandal, adopting measures such as the War Powers Resolution (1973) and the Case–Church Amendment ending direct U.S. combat operations in Indochina. Debates over foreign aid appropriations for South Vietnam, Cambodia, and Laos, concern about U.S. support for authoritarian governments, and revelations about covert action contributed to pressure for new statutory limits and reporting requirements in foreign assistance legislation.

S. 3394, introduced by Senator John Sparkman of Alabama and reported by the Senate Committee on Foreign Relations, was the vehicle for the 1974 amendments. The bill passed both houses by narrow margins after extensive debate over Indochina assistance, restrictions on aid to Chile, and language on human rights and covert action, and was signed into law by President Gerald Ford on December 30, 1974. In his signing statement, Ford expressed support for the overall objectives of the Act but criticized several of its detailed limitations, including reduced aid levels for Cambodia and South Vietnam and restrictions on assistance to Turkey and Chile.

== Provisions ==
=== Development and economic assistance ===
The Act amended multiple sections of part I of the Foreign Assistance Act of 1961 dealing with development assistance. It adjusted authorizations for population programs, education and human resources, and agriculture, including changes in funding levels for family planning and nutrition programs. It also revised loan and guaranty provisions and created or expanded authority for housing and other credit guarantee programs aimed at encouraging private investment in developing countries.

Section 639 of the 1961 Act, on famine and disaster relief, was rewritten to authorize up to $40 million in disaster assistance for fiscal year 1975 and to require quarterly reports to Congress on the programming and obligation of those funds, with at least $25 million earmarked for Cyprus following the 1974 conflict on the island.

=== Human rights provisions ===
Section 46 of the Act added section 502B, entitled "Human Rights," to chapter 1 of part II of the 1961 Act (codified at 22 U.S.C. § 2304). Section 502B declared that, except in "extraordinary circumstances," the president should substantially reduce or terminate security assistance to any government that engaged in a consistent pattern of "gross violations of internationally recognized human rights," and required the executive branch to inform Congress when such assistance was nevertheless proposed or furnished.

The provision specified that gross violations included practices such as torture or cruel, inhuman, or degrading treatment or punishment, prolonged detention without charges or trial, enforced disappearance, and other flagrant denials of the right to life, liberty, or security of person. It also directed that, in determining whether a government fell within these standards, consideration should be given to its cooperation with investigations by international organizations such as the International Committee of the Red Cross and bodies operating under the United Nations or the Organization of American States.

In addition to the general standard in section 502B, other provisions tied specific aid ceilings to human rights performance. For example, section 26 placed a limit on military assistance and related defense articles for South Korea that could be increased only after the president reported to Congress that the South Korean government was making "substantial progress" in respecting internationally recognized human rights. Scholars of U.S. foreign policy have identified the 1974 amendments, and section 502B in particular, as an early effort to make respect for human rights an explicit criterion in U.S. security assistance law.

=== Indochina assistance and restrictions ===
Several sections of the Act addressed postwar relief and reconstruction in Indochina and imposed detailed conditions on U.S. involvement there. Section 36 authorized up to $617 million in assistance for the relief and reconstruction of South Vietnam, Cambodia, and Laos in fiscal year 1975, with specified amounts reserved for each country and for regional and administrative costs. Related sections set aside funds for humanitarian programs benefiting South Vietnamese children, including support for day-care centers, orphanages, school feeding programs, health services, and adoption-related activities.

At the same time, section 36(c) barred the provision of assistance to South Vietnam, Cambodia, or Laos under part I of the 1961 Act during fiscal year 1975 and made that prohibition non-waivable under the general waiver authority of section 614 or any other provision of law. Section 38 and parallel provisions for Laos and Cambodia required that no funds could be obligated for specified purposes in or for those countries in any fiscal year beginning after June 30, 1975, unless the funds had been specifically authorized by subsequent legislation and imposed quarterly reporting requirements on all U.S. obligations "in, to, for, or on behalf of" South Vietnam.

In his signing statement, President Ford warned that the economic and military assistance amounts approved for Cambodia and South Vietnam were, in his view, "clearly inadequate" to meet minimum needs and might hinder U.S. efforts to support negotiations and reconstruction there.

=== Middle East and regional provisions ===
The Act authorized substantial economic support and military credit programs for Middle Eastern states as part of U.S. efforts to consolidate ceasefires and advance Arab–Israeli negotiations following the Yom Kippur War. Specific titles increased assistance for Israel, Egypt, and Jordan and created a new part VI of the 1961 Act dealing with Middle East peace, under which security assistance for the region also fell within the scope of the human rights conditionality in section 502B.

Other regional and thematic provisions addressed famine and disaster relief (with Cyprus earmarks), U.S. policy toward developing countries in Africa, and a statement of policy on Portuguese territories in Angola, Mozambique, and Guinea-Bissau, emphasizing support for self-determination, human rights, and development assistance during their transitions to independence.

=== Restrictions on Turkey, Chile, and other countries ===
Section 620(x) of the Foreign Assistance Act of 1961, as amended by the 1974 Act, mandated the suspension of all military assistance, sales of defense articles and services (whether for cash or credit), and export licenses for arms and related technical data to the Government of Turkey. Assistance and sales could resume only after the president certified to Congress that Turkey was in compliance with existing foreign assistance and arms sales laws and that substantial progress had been made toward agreement on the presence of military forces on Cyprus. The president was authorized to suspend the embargo temporarily if such a suspension would further negotiations toward a peaceful settlement in Cyprus, but only through February 5, 1975, and under conditions that Turkey observe the ceasefire and refrain from reinforcing its forces or transferring U.S.-supplied weapons to the island.

Section 25 limited total assistance to Chile under the Foreign Assistance Act of 1961 and the Foreign Military Sales Act during fiscal year 1975 to $25 million and prohibited the use of any of these funds for military assistance, including security supporting assistance, sales, credit sales, guarantees, or excess defense articles from Department of Defense stockpiles. In his signing statement, Ford expressed regret about the cutoff of military aid to Chile, questioning its effectiveness as a tool for promoting human rights, while acknowledging congressional concern on that issue.

The Act also set country-specific limits on military and economic assistance to South Korea and India, linked in South Korea’s case to progress on human rights and in India’s case to overall ceilings on assistance and credit sales.

=== Other program changes ===
Beyond regional allocations and country-specific restrictions, the Act made a number of structural changes to foreign assistance programs. It amended contingency fund authorities, created section 659 of the 1961 Act conditioning assistance to countries hosting certain U.S. military bases on access for U.S. news media, and added section 660, which generally prohibited the use of foreign assistance funds for training or supporting foreign police, prison, or internal security forces, subject to limited exceptions. The Act also authorized small "reimbursable development programs" under section 661 to facilitate access to strategic raw materials and to promote development projects financed on reimbursable terms with countries no longer receiving regular development assistance.

== Covert actions ==
Section 32 of the Foreign Assistance Act of 1974 added section 662 to part III of the 1961 Act, commonly known as the Hughes–Ryan Amendment after Senator Harold Hughes and Representative Leo Ryan. The new section, titled "Limitation on Intelligence Activities," provided that no funds appropriated under the authority of the Act or any other law could be expended by or on behalf of the CIA for operations in foreign countries, other than those intended solely to obtain necessary intelligence, unless and until the president determined that each such operation was important to U.S. national security and reported "in a timely fashion" a description and scope of the operation to the appropriate congressional committees, including the Senate Foreign Relations Committee and the House Foreign Affairs Committee.

The Hughes–Ryan Amendment did not prohibit covert action but required presidential findings and regular notification to Congress. It is widely regarded as a turning point in the formalization of congressional oversight of U.S. intelligence activities and provided a statutory foundation for later oversight mechanisms, including the creation of the Senate and House intelligence committees in the mid-1970s.

== Implementation and legacy ==
The human rights provisions of the 1974 Act were followed by further congressional initiatives linking U.S. foreign assistance to human rights performance, including additional amendments to the Foreign Assistance Act and annual appropriations riders in the late 1970s and 1980s. Section 502B, as amended, remains part of U.S. law and continues to govern security assistance, while related provisions (such as section 116 of the 1961 Act on development assistance) have been used to justify restrictions or conditions on U.S. aid to governments implicated in serious abuses.

The Act’s detailed ceilings and reporting requirements for Indochina, its arms embargo on Turkey, and its limits on assistance to Chile and other countries reflected a broader congressional effort in the mid-1970s to use foreign aid legislation to shape U.S. responses to regional conflicts and to signal concern about the conduct of recipient governments. The Hughes–Ryan Amendment’s requirement for presidential findings and notification to Congress influenced subsequent reforms of intelligence oversight and the development of the concept of covert action "findings" in U.S. law.

== See also ==
- Foreign Assistance Act
- Hughes–Ryan Amendment
- Case–Church Amendment
