= CIA activities in Laos =

A map of Laos

CIA activities in Laos started in the 1950s. In 1959, U.S. Special Operations Forces (Military and CIA) began to train some Laotian soldiers in unconventional warfare techniques as early as the fall of 1959 under the code name "Erawan". Under this code name, General Vang Pao, who served the royal Lao family, recruited and trained his Hmong and Iu-Mien soldiers. The Hmong and Iu-Mien were targeted as allies after President John F. Kennedy, who refused to send more American soldiers to battle in Southeast Asia, took office. Instead, he called the CIA to use its tribal forces in Laos and "make every possible effort to launch guerrilla operations in North Vietnam with its Asian recruits." General Vang Pao then recruited and trained his Hmong soldiers to ally with the CIA and fight against North Vietnam. The CIA itself claims that the CIA air operations in Laos from 1955 to 1974 were the "largest paramilitary operations ever undertaken by the CIA."

For 13 years, the CIA paramilitary officers from what is now called the Special Activities Center directed native forces against North Vietnamese forces. The CIA particularly organized Hmong people to fight against the North Vietnamese-backed Pathet Lao. The Pathet Lao were the communists in Laos. The CIA-backed Hmong and Iu Mien guerrillas used Air America to "drop 46 million pounds of foodstuffs. ... transport tens of thousands of troops, conduct a highly successful photo-reconnaissance program, and engage in numerous clandestine missions using night-vision glasses and state-of-the-art electronic equipment." This was the largest paramilitary operation in which the CIA participated, spanning 13 years until the Afghanistan War. The CIA was responsible for directing the natives of Laos to fight the North Vietnamese. Although such efforts ended at the 1973 signing of the Paris Peace Accords, the CIA believed it was a success as it managed to fight the enemy to a standstill and combat the communist threat. They saw it as a victory and as an accomplishment. The director at the time, Richard Helms, called it superb and discussed the amount of manpower required, and said that the CIA did a good job in supplying it.

Along with funding anti-communist militias, the CIA also conducted a massive bombing effort in Laos from 1964 to 1973. 580,000 bombing missions took place over the nine-year campaign, but it is not known how many of them were dropped by the United States Air Force and how many were dropped by the CIA. For the CIA, this was the largest paramilitary operation they had to date. By the summer of 1970 the CIA owned airline Air America had two dozen twin-engine transports, two dozen STOL aircraft and 30 helicopters dedicated to the operations in Laos. This airline employed more than 300 pilots, copilots, flight mechanics, and airfreight specialists flying out of Laos and Thailand. Although the bombing campaign was only formally disclosed to the American public in 1969, stories about the Laos bombing effort were published prior to that in The New York Times.

== Background ==
=== Politics of Laos and the CIA ===
A 1962 Time magazine article about Laos makes some points that help illustrate the context of the overt and covert actions of all sides in Laos before the Vietnam War. One of the first points the article makes is that a Laotian national identity, especially in the 1950s and 1960s, was a rare thing (since parts of Thailand and Laos were one and the same before French colonizers drew new borders and territories and Laos was part of the vast French-controlled Indochina for generations). Communist groups and those from outside, including the French colonial administration and the CIA, often exploited power vacuums that existed within the region.

"Though it has a king, a government and an army and can be found on a map, Laos does not really exist. Many of its estimated 2,000,000 people would be astonished to be called Laotians since they know themselves to be Meo or Black Thai or Khalom tribesmen among other small ethnic groups that resided in the countryside. It is a land without a railroad, a single paved highway or a newspaper. Its chief cash crop was opium."

Laos was dreamed up by French Diplomat Jean Chauvel, who in 1946 was France's Secretary-General of Foreign Affairs. At the time, post World War II France was trying to reassert its authority over its colonies in Indochina. The rebellious inhabitants had no desire to return to their prewar status as colonial subjects. In place of original Indochina, consisting of various kingdoms and principalities, Paris put together three new autonomous states within the French Union: Viet Nam, Cambodia and Laos. Drawing lines on a map, Chauvel created Laos by merging the rival kingdoms of Luangprabang, whose monarch became King of Laos, with Champassak, whose pretender was consoled by being made permanent Inspector General of the new state.

French influence did not survive long after the 1954 defeat at Dien Bien Phu. When the French declared Laos independent, it did not have a cohesive government: two Laotian provinces were run by the communist Pathet Lao under Prince Souphanouvong. His half-brother, Prince Souvanna Phouma, was chosen as Premier in 1956, and Souphanouvong and his provinces were put underneath the fledgling central government. A subsequent national election increased communist strength in the National Assembly to nine of the 21 seats, which aroused the ire of the U.S. government, which distrusted Souvanna Phouma, "both as a neutralist and a compromise with the Reds." Regime change to the right-wing General Phoumi Nosavan came not from a coup, but from stopping U.S. economic aid, which was the responsibility, subordinate to the White House, of the U.S. Agency for International Development. The new dictator invited U.S. military advisors, who came with both U.S. Defense Department and CIA personnel.

Civil war had broken out between the neutralist forces of paratroop commander Kong Le and right-wing Gen. Phoumi Nosavan. The Communist Pathet Lao supported Kong Le, while the US military and CIA lined up behind Phoumi. As Adm. Harry D. Felt, Commander in Chief of the Pacific Fleet, explained: "Phoumi is no George Washington. However, he is anti-Communist, which is what counts most in the sad Laos situation."

The CIA was largely responsible for conducting military operations in Laos, but the U.S. ambassador was the man in charge. The secret war in Laos, author Charles Stevenson has emphasized, "was William Sullivan's war." Ambassador from December 1964 to March 1969, Sullivan insisted on an efficient, closely controlled country team. "There wasn't a bag of rice dropped in Laos that he didn't know about," observed Assistant Secretary of State William Bundy. Sullivan imposed two conditions upon his subordinates. First, the thin fiction of the Geneva accords had to be maintained to avoid possible embarrassment to the Lao and Soviet Governments; military operations, therefore, had to be carried out in relative secrecy. Second, no regular U.S. ground troops were to become involved. In general, Ambassador Sullivan and his successor, G. McMurtrie Godley, successfully carried out this policy.

=== CIA operations in Laos, proprietary airlines ===
According to William M. Leary, a historian at the University of Georgia who analyzed Laotian operations for the CIA Center for the Study of Intelligence, CIA-led covert action in Laos was the largest paramilitary operation in the history of the Agency.

In 1950, the CIA—supporting but not directing covert action until 1952—determined that it could best meet its support responsibilities with a proprietary airline under its private control and purchased Civil Air Transport (CAT), changing its name to Air America in 1959. Air America flew a variety of missions in Laos, including transporting supplies, personnel (both civilian and military) and conducting covert operations. The airline was crucial to the CIA's covert operations in Laos and disguised itself as a commercial airline to maintain secrecy. "In August 1950, the Agency secretly purchased the assets of Civil Air Transport (CAT), an airline that had been started in China after World War II by Gen. Claire L. Chennault and Whiting Willauer. CAT would continue to fly commercial routes throughout Asia, acting in every way as a privately owned commercial airline. At the same time, under the corporate guise of CAT Incorporated, it provided airplanes and crews for secret intelligence operations. During the Korean War, for example, it made more than 100 hazardous overflights of mainland China, airdropping agents and supplies."

==== Allegations of CIA drug trafficking ====
As a Ph.D. candidate in Southeast Asian history at Yale University, Alfred McCoy, testifying before the United States Senate Committee on Appropriations foreign operations subcommittee on June 2, 1972, "accused American officials of condoning and even cooperating with corrupt elements in Southeast Asia's illegal drug trade out of political and military considerations." One of his major charges was that South Vietnam's President Nguyễn Văn Thiệu, Vice President Nguyễn Cao Kỳ, and Prime Minister Trần Thiện Khiêm led a narcotics ring with ties to the Corsican mafia, the Trafficante crime family in Florida, and other high-level military officials in South Vietnam, Cambodia, Laos, and Thailand. Those implicated by McCoy included Laotian Generals Ouane Rattikone and Vang Pao and South Vietnamese Generals Đặng Văn Quang and Ngô Dzu. He told the subcommittee that these military officials facilitated the distribution of heroin to American troops in Vietnam and addicts in the United States. According to McCoy, the CIA chartered Air America aircraft and helicopters in northern Laos to transport opium harvested by their "tribal mercenaries". He also accused United States Ambassador to Laos G. McMurtrie Godley of blocking the assignment of Bureau of Narcotics officials to Laos in order to maintain the Laotian government's cooperation in military and political matters. McCoy reiterated similar charges in his 1972 book The Politics of Heroin in Southeast Asia published by Harper and Row. He stated that the CIA was knowingly involved in the production of heroin in the Golden Triangle of Burma, Thailand, and Laos. The CIA denies the accusation that they may have been involved in the drug trade.

The United States Department of State responded to the initial allegations stating that they were "unable to find any evidence to substantiate them, much less proof." Subsequent investigations by the Inspector General of the CIA, United States House Committee on Foreign Affairs, and United States Senate Select Committee to Study Governmental Operations with Respect to Intelligence Activities (i.e. the Church Committee) also found the charges to be unsubstantiated.

McCoy's allegations were later cited in Christopher Robbins' 1979 book Air America providing the basis for a film of the same name released in 1990. According to Leary, a University of Georgia historian who analyzed Laotian operations for the CIA Center for the Study of Intelligence, the film Air America was responsible for Air America's poor public image. He stated that his two decades of research found Air America not involved in drug trafficking. Nonetheless, McCoy finds the CIA culpable in drug-trafficking on the part of the Laotians. According to Leary, "The CIA's main focus in Laos remained on fighting the war, not on policing the drug trade."

== 1953 ==
In April 1953, the French had established a leading military base at Dien Bien Phu, based deep in a mountain basin in Tonkin Province remote northwestern Vietnam. The base was designed to block communist supply lines in neighboring Laos. The base would also be a tantalizing target for the Viet Minh attacks that the French could readily defend with their superior firepower. Unfortunately, the communist foes besieged the base and five other separate firebases which facilitated to the French colonial forces in Indochina requesting U.S. air transport "to fly tanks and heavy equipment to their hard-pressed forces in Laos. "Having such equipment," the French emphasized, "might mean the difference between holding and losing Laos."

At this point, the CAT role evolved from clandestine to covert. The Eisenhower Administration, unwilling to give overt support, decided to use CAT to fulfill the French request, in Operation SQUAW, which got underway on May 6. The U.S. Air Force provided CAT with "sterile" (i.e., with American military identification removed) C-119 transports, capable of carrying the heavy loads required by the French. CAT personnel was unfamiliar with the C-119, and the Air Force held a short but intense training course for them at Clark Air Force Base in the Philippines. On May 5, they flew six of the transports, repainted with French insignia, to Gia Lam airbase, outside Hanoi, and parachuted supplies and equipment to French forces in Laos until July 16 with CAT pilots making numerous airdrops to French troops in Laos.

== 1954 ==
In 1954, the French again asked for help in supporting their isolated base at Dien Bien Phu. CAT, contracting with the French in January 1954 to provide 24 pilots to fly 12 C-119 aircraft, agreed to maintenance under USAF ground crews at Hanoi's Cat Bi airfield in support of Dien Bien Phu. Flights started in March, as the Viet Minh began their assault, and continued until Dien Bien Phu fell on May 7. Two CAT pilots died and one other was wounded.

CAT operations continued after the fall of Dien Bien Phu. The C-119s supported isolated French outposts, and CAT also provided 12 C-46 transports to evacuate civilians from North to South Vietnam. CAT also carried members of the CIA's Saigon Military Mission (see Vietnam 1954) north of the 17th parallel, in a futile attempt to set up stay-behind networks. Laos was declared neutral but due to its location, it effectively functioned as a microcosm of the war. Per the Domino theory, the United States proclaimed Laos a buffer state due to it bordering North Vietnam and China.

== 1955 ==
In January 1955, the U.S. created the United States Operations Mission (USOM) in Vientiane, Laos, to provide foreign aid. By the end of the year, a Programs Evaluation Office (PEO), staffed by retired military personnel or military officers, quietly delegated leadership to the CIA. The PEO was a covert equivalent to a Military Assistance Advisory Group (MAAG), organized within USOM to handle military aid, though not usually within the scope of USOM. The CIA was involved with the PEO until US military involvement was acknowledged and a MAAG established.

In July 1955, USOM officials learned that a rice failure threatened famine in several provinces in Laos. Because a number of these areas were in remote, mountainous regions, airdrops proved the only feasible means to delivering essential supplies of rice and salt. Three CAT C-46s arrived at the northeastern railhead of Udon Thani, Thailand on September 11 to begin the airlift. By the end of the month, CAT had flown more than 200 missions to 25 reception areas having delivered 1,000 tons of emergency food. This airdrop relief operation, conducted with smooth efficiency, marked the beginning of CAT's—and later Air America's—support of U.S. assistance programs in Laos.

== 1957 ==
A new CAT contract was signed in 1957, and Bruce Blevins flew a C-47 to Vientiane in the service of the U.S. Embassy. When he flew elsewhere in the country, conditions were technologically underdeveloped. Vientiane had the only control tower, radio navigational aid, and non-dirt runway in Laos. The U.S., again through covert means, increased its level of support.

Furthermore, a 1957 cable from American intelligence officials in Laos to Washington noted the inability for the communist Pathet Lao (PL) and Royal Laotian Guard (RLG) to come to a peaceful resolution. The cable stated that in late 1957, agreements were signed between the two groups to cease civil conflict. While the deal was also intended to result in the assimilation of the PL into larger Laotian society, the CIA had gathered intelligence implying that the PL had not meant to abandon its "radical" ideology and desire to overthrow the democratic government headed by the RLG. Instead, the CIA believed that the PL desired to establish a communist government via subversive political and covert actions as opposed to overt military operations. Nevertheless, the CIA feared that the PL was more than willing to revert to the use of force if their new tactics proved unsuccessful.

The following cable demonstrates this type of subversion: "PL propagandists and terrorists continued to visit the villages telling the villagers to refuse to obey RLG officials, and that the PL would soon take overall power and punish those who opposed them, and that the refusal of the people to support the PL would mean a renewal of the civil war." As a result, the return of the two provinces to the RLG had been nullified and the PL continued to rule the provinces except places occupied by Lao National Army.

== 1958 ==
In an October 1958 memorandum, the CIA acknowledged that the agency had been handed the responsibility to oversee covert operations within Laos. The State Department recognized the CIA's covert operations and suggested the development of overt operations. Additionally, the State Department outlined a document that covered all hypothetical situations in Chile and hinted that the CIA might consider taking action for one of those hypothetical operations. The memorandum requested the chief of the Far East Division to consider the role of the CIA in Laos and how valid their suggestions for operations were. This memorandum revealed that there existed a well-thought-out plot that took into account Laotian concerns and U.S. interests in Laos and not merely a simple military reaction. However, the actual plans were redacted from the document as well as the names of those involved. Though this could suggest the planning of something more wicked, it could also be a diplomatic choice in not angering a nation long after the fact that certain considerations were never acted upon.

As the civil war grew in intensity, CAT C-47s and C-46s passed with ever greater frequency over Vientiane to fulfill urgent airdrop requests. Blevins was also kept busy, landing throughout the country and making numerous airdrops to isolated posts of the Royal Lao Armed Forces (Forces Armées du Royaume or FAR). He developed an especially close relationship with a CIA case officer who had arrived in October 1958 and who was assigned to support neutralist Capt. Kong Le's parachute battalion, a Laotian officer who would rise to the highest ranks. '

== 1959 ==
Victor B. Anthony and Richard R. Sexton, two Air Force historians, prepared a 400-page document called The War in Northern Laos, 1954-1973 showing that the Joint Chiefs of Staff had conceived a plan for U.S. military intervention in Laos as early as 1959, two years earlier than previously thought. In fall 1959, the U.S. Special Forces initiated training a number of Laotian soldiers in unconventional warfare tactics under the codename Erawan. This development occurred due to the U.S. being unable to integrate the Pathet Lao communist army with the royal army. Air America—the name changed on March 26, 1959, primarily to avoid confusion about the air proprietary's operations in Japan 16—provided essential transportation for the expanding American effort in Laos.

Since the Laotian government wanted U.S. assistance to remain secret in the Laotian Civil War against the Pathet Lao, the CIA established a unit from the United States Army Special Forces who arrived on the CIA proprietary airline Air America, wearing civilian clothes and having no obvious U.S. connection. These soldiers led Hmong tribesmen against communist forces. The covert teams, called white star teams, in Project Hotfoot. At the U.S. Embassy, Brigader General John Heintges was labeled the head of the "Program Evaluation Office".

During the summer of 1959, North Vietnam invaded Laos, which made the U.S. believe that its chances of success became even lower. They believed that the anti-Pathet policies had little chance of success due to the invasion. As part of the effort to turn the tides around, the “Air Force Chief of Staff Gen. Thomas D. White proposed that a “full-time” MAAG military operation should be established in Vientiane. White suggested that, due to the turn of events, it was prudent to fully take over the training from the French. White was convinced that it was the call in the right direction despite a possible international conflict this might spark, as it would serve as the means of saving “Laos from communism”. On the flip side while White's proposal was under review, Under Secretary of State for Political Affairs Robert D. Murphy warned of the possibility of China entering the war if the United States Army rushed to enter the war as the proposal of General White suggested. Murphy reasoned that there was “no proof” supporting the claim that North Vietnamese troops “were fighting in Laos”. Despite the caution from Murphy, the MAAG proposal was approved by president Dwight D. Eisenhower following a joint Chief of staff memorandum to the Secretary of Defense which was in support of the military operation.

The U.S. Special Forces Group, code-named Project Hotfoot, under the command of Lieutenant Colonel Arthur "Bull" Simons, deployed clandestinely to Laos. Twelve Mobile Training Teams took up duties in Vientiane, Luang Prabang, Savannakhet, and Pakse. CIA officials in Laos had requested additional air transport resources. The CIA, in August 1959, directed CIA proprietary Air America to train two helicopter pilots. Further, Air America directed search and rescue missions in Laos in addition to its role in combat operations. Originally posted as a short-term requirement, this operation served as the beginning of a significant rotary-wing operation in Laos. Vang Pao expressed concerns that the Hmong were likely to suffer reprisals from communists and, with assistance from a U.S. Special Forces team, he began to organize a Hmong stay-behind force. Declassified documents from 2008 also revealed that the U.S. ambassador in Laos at the time served as the field commander of the so-called "secret war" there.

Still concerned about whether the MAAG military operation could succeed in solving the Laos crisis, On September 8, General White requested from the joint Chief of Staff for more advanced sophisticated military arsenals like the “squadron of Strategic Air Command (SAC) B-47 jet bombers to the United Air Base in the Philippines. According to the CIA military historians, Victor Anthony and Richard Sexton, White aimed to cripple the opposing forces together with their supply tracks, including targeted sections of the North Vietnam territory.

Previously secret U.S. Air Force official histories of the Vietnam war were published in April 2008 by the National Security Archive which disclosed for the first time that, outside of just training locals, Central Intelligence Agency contract employees had a direct role in combat air attacks when they flew Laotian government aircraft on strike missions. Additionally, the Air Force actively considered nuclear weapons options during the 1959 Laos crisis. Although these considerations and the entire proposal were withdrawn, White believed it was a step in the right direction due to it possibility of restraining Asian communists from participating in the war if they were aware that the United States' “counteractions would not be confined to Laos or conventional weapons.”

By December 1959, Vang Pao had to either fight the communists or leave the country. If the United States supplied the weapons, Vang Pao claimed that he would fight and raise an army of 10,000.

This aforementioned activity in 1959 was caused by an inability to integrate the Pathet Lao communist military into the Royal Lao Armed forces (FAE), precipitating a civil war in which the U.S. Air Force deployed a squadron of B-47 bombers to the Clark Air Force Base. This deployment ensured that the bomber could be used to interfere or destroy Pathet Lao communications to the North Vietnamese.

== 1960 ==
From 1960 to 1961, the CIA initiated operations code-named Erawan in which U.S. Special Forces trained Laotian soldiers in methods of unconventional warfare to be used against the enemy. The previous training of the Laotian military was underdeveloped and had "caused friction between the Americans and the French." After a request from Phoumi in February, Washington decided to extend training programs for the Laotian military. However, negotiations over the nature and structure of the training programs created divisions between the French, Washington, and Phoumi. The French wanted to retain complete control over the Laotian Army, but Phoumi objected. Phoumi asserted his desire to have the French completely removed from Laos. He also voiced sentiments advocating for the U.S. Special Forces to control the training operations. The French voiced objections to U.S. presence in Laos stating that such intervention violated the Geneva accords, a position supported by Souvanna Phouma. After a long series of negotiations combined with interventions from the Royal Thailand Government, U.S. Special Forces infiltrated the Lao countryside and began training Laotians in unconventional warfare and anti-guerilla tactics.

Eventually, four CAT pilots were trained on U.S. Air Force H-19A helicopters in Japan and the Philippines. The CAT contingent did not reach Laos until March 1960. Due to the operating limitations of the H-19s, the underpowered helicopters could fly only at lower elevations in the country. "Generally, they were used to carry CIA case officers to meetings in outlying areas and to distribute leaflets during elections. By June 1960, it had become clear that helicopters would form a permanent part of Air America's operations in Laos."

Air America hired four experienced U.S. Marine Corps helicopter pilots who obtained their discharges in Okinawa to fly the H-19s. Later in the year, the CIA arranged for the Marine Corps to transfer four UH-34 helicopters to Air America to replace the H-19s.

Also in 1960, a national election was held of dubious integrity. "Phoumi's group gained a sweeping majority. On the surface, a relatively tough U.S. policy of containing Communism seemed to be an overwhelming success ... $250 million in U.S. economic and military aid had too powerful an effect on the Laotian government, which was soon reeling with corruption. Promised reforms never materialized, and practically no funds reached the peasants and forest tribes. The Communist Pathet Lao guerrilla bands began raiding in the north. Red Prince Souphanouvong not only walked out of jail but took most of his prison guards with him."

In August 1960, Kong Le, who had formed a friendship with a CIA officer in 1958, still returned neutralist Souvanna Phouma to power with a military coup. Phoumi Nosavan, who had much closer CIA relations, took refuge in his base in Savannakhet, in southern Laos.

The U.S. encouraged Phoumi Nosavan, in December, to attack Kong Le's battalion in Vientiane.

Kong Le retreated to the strategic Plaine des Jarres, joining forces with the Pathet Lao. The Soviet Union poured in supplies by air, and Communist North Vietnam contributed tough guerrilla cadres. When Phoumi's army advanced, it was badly beaten in a series of noisy but largely bloodless battles. Phoumi got some breathing space when, in the spring of 1961, the government eagerly agreed to a ceasefire.

From 1960 to 1975 the CIA ran a clandestine sideshow to the Vietnam War within Laos. Long Cheng was a secret air base built by the CIA during the Vietnam war. This base was so secretive that not even Congress was aware of its existence. Long Cheng was unmarked, un-mapped and known only by a select few. It became the CIA headquarters during the Vietnam War and was so active that more than four hundred flights flew to and from Long Cheng on a daily basis. The secret operations in Laos grew into the largest CIA operation in history. Laos was used as a pawn for its strategic positioning between its neighboring countries from which the United States could launch military attacks. Laos has been reported as the most intensely bombed country in the history of war. More bombs were dropped in the "Plain of Jars" than anywhere else in the world. Before the war started, more than 50 thousand people lived there, many of whom belonged to the Hmong tribe. When fighter jets could not reach their targets, they would unload bombs on Laos because of the inability to land with bombs on board. For a period of nine years, the U.S. Air Force conducted bombing missions against Laos every eight minutes. The worst bombings were around Long Cheng and Sam Thong.

In 1971 three journalists made it to Laos, uncovered the secret airbase and attempted to expose Long Cheng to the public. Their discovery, however, did not make the front page news. The U.S. military informed U.S. citizens that it was conducting a humanitarian mission in Laos. The media fabricated stories about U.S. building hospitals and providing development aid to Laos. While secret airstrikes were taking place in other provinces of Laos, Americans in the capital of Laos, Vientiane, were unaware of the situation. The U.S. sent $454 million in aid to Vientiane and built this façade to keep their covert operations in motion. Finally, in 1975, the CIA evacuated Laos after the communist Pathet won the civil war.

== 1961 ==
In January 1961, John F. Kennedy became president while at the same time the CIA paramilitary forces were deeply involved in making arrangements for the Bay of Pigs in Cuba which was to occur three months later. Thus, the CIA was unable to adequately supply air support for the Air Force Project code-named Mill Pond. The crews were to fly unmarked B-26 bombers on interdiction missions over Laos. The end result was that the Air Force provided crews, disguised as civilians, for the operation. Either the Air Force itself or the CIA created a phony corporation in Thailand as the ostensible employer of these airmen. The episode marked the first direct commitment of U.S. military forces to the Laotian war. This was due to the resources they thought they would have available not being available as they were being used to deal with the Cuban missile exile.

With authorization to arm and train 1,000 Hmong as a test of the concept, Lair again visited Vang Pao and arranged for an arms drop at Pa Dong, a mountaintop base south of the PDJ. In January 1961, Air America delivered weapons to the first 300 trainees.

According to Time,

To force him to accept a coalition government, the U.S. stopped paying Laos $3 million a month in economic aid, but there has never been any skimping in U.S. equipment and the training of Phoumi's Royal Laotian Army. The grim truth—as shown again last month at Nam Tha—is that Phoumi's men will not fight. Some observers suggest Phoumi wanted his army to collapse to force U.S. intervention—perhaps relying on President Kennedy's March 1961 telecast, when he said that a Red takeover in Laos would "quite obviously affect the security of the U.S."

American visibility increased in 1961, possibly as a signal to Phoumi. The covert advisory group was acknowledged, and called the White Star organization, commanded by Arthur D. Simons In addition to operating against the Pathet Lao, the White Star teams harassed the North Vietnamese on the Ho Chi Minh trail, which had been formed in May 1959 under the North Vietnamese Army's 559th Transportation Group, whose unit number reflected its creation date. Many of the White Star personnel moved into the Studies and Observation Group, which operated from South Vietnam but ran cross-border operations into North Vietnam, Cambodia and Laos. By the middle of 1961, the Laotian Army Air force (LAAF), who had always struggled with morale, skill, and equipment, were aided by the USAF. American pilots trained the LAAF in terms of flight techniques. Some of them spoke French, but even the ones who could not demonstrate leadership qualities that earned respect from the Laotian pilots. Though the T-6, the LAAF fighter pilot, lacked armor and was not permitted to carry bombs, their training made the pilots more nimble in the air, as well as enhanced their morale.

In the early months of 1961, Air America had only a handful of helicopters and STOL aircraft available to support CIA operations in Laos. This changed in early March when the new administration of President Kennedy became alarmed after Kong Le and the Pathet Lao captured a key road junction and threatened Vientiane and the royal capital at Luang Prabang. Kennedy again placed U.S. military forces in the region on alert, and he also authorized the transfer of 14 UH-34 helicopters from the Marine Corps to Air America to be flown by Marine, Army, and Navy "volunteers".

President Kennedy began seeking a diplomatic solution at a June 1961 meeting in Vienna. Soviet Premier Nikita Khrushchev both supported a neutral and independent Laos through a joint statement. As this meeting took place negotiators in Geneva got together to work out a settlement to the problem.

== 1962 ==
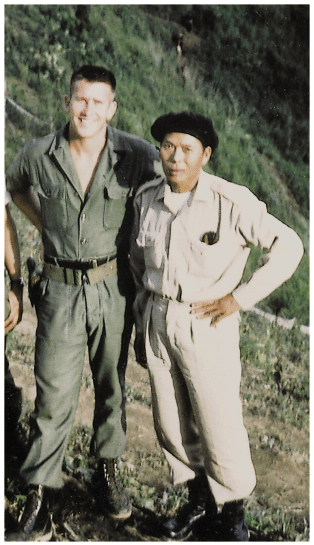
CIA operative Dick Holm and a Hmong fighter in mid-1962

The CIA-organized group of Hmong tribesmen fighting in the Vietnam War is known as the "Secret Army", and their participation was called the Secret War, where the Secret War is meant to denote the Laotian Civil War (1960–1975) and the Laotian front of the Vietnam War.

On July 23, 1962, a formal "Declaration on the Neutrality of Laos" was signed in Geneva. This neutrality provided for a coalition government and the withdrawal of all foreign troops from the country by October 7. After this declaration was signed the U.S. pulled out 666 military advisors and support staff, and Air America stopped dropping weapons to the Hmong. The U.S. followed the guidelines of this declaration and only allowed the CIA to retain only two men in Laos to monitor communist compliance with the agreement.

CIA offices soon found that the North Vietnamese Army had failed to remove 7,000 troops, who were expanding Northern Vietnamese positions in Laos. CIA reports from officers in the hills were soon pleading for arms so that the Hmong could defend themselves against the NVA onslaught. Under Secretary of State Averell Harriman granted these requests on an individual basis going forward.

On August 17, 1962, five American prisoners released by the Pathet Lao, as well as several members of NSBC in Laos, estimated the North Vietnamese Forces in Laos to be around 10,000. CIA road watch teams reported trucks full of North Vietnamese troops heading toward the North Vietnamese border, but would be unable to confirm whether all the troops had left Laos. A document released by the CIA makes a note of Souvanna Phouma possibly making a deal with Souphanouvong to keep the Vietnamese and Chinese communists presence secret if they left Laos, again making it difficult to confirm their departure.

== 1963 ==
Reports reaching CIA Headquarters from its two officers in Laos suggested that the apparent quiet stemming from the neutrality declaration was deceptive. It soon became clear that 7,000 North Vietnamese Army (NVA) troops had not left the country. In fact, the NVA was expanding its areas of control, attacking both neutralist and Hmong positions throughout Laos. As Hmong ammunition stores dwindled, William Colby, who was head of the CIA's Far East Division, pleaded to Harriman to allow the resumption of air shipments. "My arguments became more forceful," Colby recalled, "reflecting the intense cables I was receiving from the two CIA officers who were still up in the hills observing and reporting on what was happening." Harriman reluctantly approved an Air America arms drop—along with instructions that it is used for purely defensive purposes. Further shipments followed. As Colby pointed out, however, Harriman personally approved "each and every clandestine supply flight and its cargo."

As Hanoi sent additional troops into Laos during 1963, the Kennedy administration authorized the CIA to increase the size of the Hmong army, now headquartered in the valley of Long Tieng. By the end of the year, a reported 20,000 Hmong were armed. They acted as guerrillas, blowing up NVA supply depots, ambushing trucks, mining roads, and generally harassing the stronger enemy force. Air America again took a greater role in the slowly expanding conflict.

== 1964 ==
In 1964 marked the initially limited employment of U.S.-Thailand and Laos operations. The United States believed that because there was more communist activity in Laos, it threatened South Vietnam. The Royal Laotian Air Force (RLAF) began to receive increased support from the United States. Counterinsurgency training, assisting cooperation, and logistical support were some of the types of aids provided at this time. The RLAF saw an additional endowment of resources from the U.S. after a failed right-wing attempted coup catalyzed a resurrection of Pathet Lao onslaughts on rightists and neutralists in the Plaines des Jarres. The U.S. wanted to bolster the RLAF due to North Vietnam's use of Laos to supply men and arms through the communist Pathet Lao. In early March 1964, the U.S. sent a detachment of the Air Force to Udorn, Thailand, to train Lao-Thai forces for six months. This detachment was also responsible for counterinsurgency training, providing logistic support, and supporting the RLAF in combat if necessary. Full-scale fighting broke out in Laos in March 1964 when North Vietnamese and Pathet Lao forces attacked across the Plaines des Jarres. In mid-May the Pathet Lao communists had taken control of the strategic region. This event prompted the U.S. to release ordnance, allowing the RLAF to begin fighting back against the Pathet Lao with the logistical support of the U.S.

Because the airstrikes only allowed to be performed by the RLAF, at the request of the U.S. ambassador in Vientianne, the RLAF received seven T-28s loaned temporarily by the U.S. On 20 May, an additional 10 T/RT-28 were loaned by South Vietnam to the RLAF. At this time, the U.S. Joint Chief of Staff agreed to send three C-47 to train the RLAF pilots. The C-47s and 21 personnel arrived in Ubon on 24 July and immediately started to train the Laotian air and ground crew.

In January 1964, the CIA began training Lao and Thai counterinsurgents in Thailand. This was because the previous Geneva agreements did not allow for training to take place in Laos. The hope was for these counterinsurgents to be able to fight back if and when Vietcong forces should move offensively through Laos. During 1964 the RLAF - Royal Laotian Air Force - were loaned a total of 33 T-28 bombers for use in the fighting.

In May 1964, the U.S. Air Force began flying reconnaissance missions over the Laotian panhandle to obtain target information on men and equipment shuttled into South Vietnam over the Ho Chi Minh Trail.

The problem addressed by the Special National Intelligence Estimate (SNIE) of May 25 was to determine if there was a set of actions that would cause the Democratic (i.e., North) Republic of Vietnam (DRV) to reduce activities in the Republic (i.e., South) of Vietnam (RVN), and to respect the 1962 Geneva agreements on Laos. It assumed the air and naval action primarily without attacks on population centers or the use of nuclear weapons. The DRV, China, and USSR would be informed that U.S. intentions were limited.1964 can be seen as a start date of U.S. airstrikes in Laos

On June 24, 1964, the U.S. government formally endorsed Operation Triangle. This endorsement allowed for escorting fighters to strike enemy activity detected during such flights while opening the door to armed recon missions. The U.S. Army and Air Force personnel were allowed to serve as advisors to the Laotian troops.

Towards the middle of the summer in 1964, the U.S. involvement in Laos had relieved many military issues. Many of the American-endorsed operations in Laos proved successful and, in turn, incentivized more involvement. Various proposals were put in motion requesting quicker mission approvals and more lenient rules of engagement. However, none of these proposals were approved, and involvement in Laos remained limited. The U.S. concluded that Laos' military situation was more stable, despite issues in South Vietnam becoming more apparent and serious.

Estimates had the DRV waiting on military action while stirring diplomatic opinion against the U.S. In the absence of U.S forces in Laos, however, it was judged capable of taking control of the country. While the DRV could resist an RVN ground attack, its air defenses were primitive and would be unlikely to accept Chinese assistance other than perhaps antiaircraft guns but not fighters. The estimate did suggest that a campaign against the North would have to be quick and intense, not the gradual escalation that was used.

== 1965 ==
The year 1965 marked the beginning of major military activity in what became known as the secret war in Laos. Although the full extent of the conflict was not revealed to the U.S. public until 1969–70, the war was not all that secret. News of the fighting frequently found its way into the pages of the Bangkok Post, The New York Times, and other newspapers. Congress was kept well informed. As former CIA Director Richard Helms has pointed out, the Appropriations subcommittees were regularly briefed on the war funds. Also, Senator Stuart Symington and other Congressmen visited Laos and gave every indication of approving what transpired. They believed, Helms noted, that "It was a much cheaper and better way to fight a war in Southeast Asia than to commit American troops."

The CIA was largely responsible for conducting military operations in Laos, but the U.S. Ambassador was the man in charge. The secret war in Laos, author Charles Stevenson has emphasized, "was William Sullivan's war". Ambassador from December 1964 to March 1969, Sullivan insisted on an efficient, closely controlled country team. "There wasn't a bag of rice dropped in Laos that he didn't know about", observed Assistant Secretary of State William Bundy. Sullivan imposed two conditions upon his subordinates. First, the thin fiction of the Geneva accords had to be maintained to avoid possible embarrassment to the Lao and Soviet Governments; military operations, therefore, had to be carried out in relative secrecy. Second, no regular U.S. ground troops were to become involved. Kennedy did not want to use U.S. troops, to avoid domestic consequences and costs. Early actions in Southeast Asia involved secret use of U.S. military personnel through the CIA. Now the CIA used non-American soldiers in the conflict secretly. In general, Ambassador Sullivan and his successor, G. McMurtrie Godley, successfully carried out this policy.

USAF-Navy combat sorties from July through November ranged from about 1,000 to 1,500 per month. In November, because of a perceived rise in communist activity, Gen. Westmoreland increased his required number of sorties to 4,500 per month, but because of bad weather and some diversion of the effort, achieved 2,700.

In March, the American embassy and MACV was able to successfully implement "a small-scale chokepoint program". This program was aimed at preventing easy commerce between North Vietnam and Laos to "increase the burden on enemy supply lines."

An Air America combat rescue mission in May 1965 resulted in the most serious accidental airstrike incident to date, even though Ambassador William Sullivan thought that the contractor was more likely to avoid incidents than the Air Force.

On Christmas, 1965, President Johnson promised a bombing halt on Vietnam. This "halt" turned out to be a redirection at Laos, conducted by the U.S. Air Force. Operation "Tiger Hound" it was called. Tiger Hound used aircraft from four U.S. military branches, and the Royal Lao Airforce. McNamara sent a report to President Johnson that had 12 favors. Johnson urged for there to be another airstrike against North Vietnam. The president approved for the first time approval of airstrike against the North Vietnam and Viet Cong who were making their way into Laos.

At years-end CIA-DIA analysis of the air attacks on the North since they began on February 7, 1965, they indicated that they had inflicted about $28.5 million worth of damage. The North's economy, however, showed no sign of disintegration.

== 1968 ==
In 1968 the U.S. had a well-established system for conducing war in Laos. The CIA led the ground campaign, which was directed by the U.S. ambassador. The CIA was also responsible for establishing air support. However, the Air Force was skeptical of the CIA run operation.

The Seventh Air Force questioned the need for security. It questioned the CIA expertise in air operations. The Air Force viewed the CIA as too narrow-minded in its approach. The CIA was pressed for 10 months by the Air Force for plans from their inception. The CIA was pressed for 10 months by the Air Force for plans when they were originally conceived. Conversations did no good and written requests were initiated .

However, the fall of Nam Bac caused much discord in northwestern Laos: "as the Americans feared, the loss of Nam Bac shattered FAR morale and virtually erased these forces as a factor in the war." More importantly, the fall of Nam Bac caused the CIA's intelligence gathering in the region to be quite insignificant and the CIA withdrew much of its personnel in the region: "the fall of Nam Bac also crippled the CIA's intelligence collection in northwestern Laos." Intelligence analysts also continued to wonder about Chinese objectives in the region, and there did not seem to be a conclusive decision on what exactly the Chinese were doing in the region at the time.

This created conflict between the CIA and the Air Force resulting in the reduced effectiveness of U.S. operations in Laos. The Air Force resisted providing higher level of air support for combat.

== 1969 ==
A memorandum from November 12, from Kissinger to Nixon reviewed the procedure for attacks in Laos. Kissinger raised several questions in response to a CIA memorandum on Vang Pao's offensive in the Plain of Jars. A joint response from the CIA and the Departments of Defense and State said:

- U.S. ability to control (including veto) a Lao operation is to all practical purposes complete because U.S. matériel and air support are vital.
- In practice, most operations are conceived by commanders of individual Military Regions in close conjunction with U.S. Military Attachés or in the case of Vang Pao and the other irregulars, with the local CIA Area Chief. *In brief, the U.S. clearance procedures are as follows:
- The cognizant U.S. military attaché or CIA Area Chief forwards the request to U.S. Country Team, consisting of Ambassador, DCM, Military Attachés and CIA Station Chief.
- Vang Pao's operations are also cleared by the CIA base at Udom, Thailand which assesses the Agency's ability to provide the necessary support.
- The Ambassador requests authorization from State for politically sensitive operations or activities exceeding established operating procedures and refers requests for air support to MACV. To combat Northern Vietnamese advancements the United States bombed the Ho Chi Minh Trail along with North Vietnamese troop concentrations in northern Laos. Through the United States Air Force there was an effort that took place to upgrade air operations located in northern Laos. The U.S. Air Force introduced airborne radio direction finding. The EC-47 aircraft could monitor and locate enemy radio transmissions. Colonel Duskin convinced Robert A. Hurwitz that the OV-1 Mohawk could enhance intelligence collections during Barrel Roll which provided night-time reconnaissance.

The 1969 communist offensive spurred improvements in the Royal Laotian Air Force as well. Laotian T-28 plane counts jumped from 235 to 1367 in five months. The increase in plane production called for a need for more pilots to be trained. Also, "hampered by monsoon rains, among the heaviest ever seen, ABOUT FACE got underway on 6 August 1969. Eight battalions moved on the Plain of Jars while two more battalions and several hundred Hmong militias approached the road between Ban Ban and Nong Pet. Not to be confused with NangHet, on the Vietnamese border. The significance of Nang Petlay in its location west of Ban Ban at the intersection of Route 7, leading directly into the Plain of Jars, and Route 71, which bypassed the plain to the north. The weather posed more of an obstacle than the communists, who to the attackers' astonished delight abandoned without a fight not only their defensive positions but also major supply dumps. Despite suspected leaks of Vang Pao's intentions, the government forces had achieved complete tactical surprise, and the overextended enemy simply melted away." Even where the enemy had time to react, he stood by and watched the irregulars advance.

On 20 August, two SGU battalions, one Hmong and the other a Lao unit from Pakse, walked up Phou Nok Kok, the mountain commanding Route 7 between Ban Ban and 'Nong Pet. The communists did not respond until two days later, and not insufficient strength to threaten SGU positions on the heights. By then, the irregulars on Phou Nok Kok became the core of the effort to deny Route 7 to the enemy. By the 25'" the enemy had abandoned any effort to reclaim Phou Nok Kok.

On 27 August, Vang Pao's irregulars marched onto the plain itself, taking the southern salient and capturing a PT-76 tank, an artillery piece, and a truck. By this time, the Pakse SGU had cut Route 7, and its troops were patrolling the road west of Ban Ban. The station applauded the irregulars' success but wanted credit to go where credit was due. "Extremely effective airstrikes have been the key factor in guerrilla successes thus far. Heavily committed in the Muong Soui sector, to the west, and now challenged east of the plain, the North Vietnamese had contributed to Vang Pao's advance onto the plain by entrusting its defense largely to the Pathet Lao."

== 1970s ==
Air America C-123 on ramp at Long Tieng, 1970. Set up in June 1961, Long Tieng was the headquarters for Vang Pao, who led irregular forces of the Meo people, a CIA ally in the conflict with Pathet Lao. (Source: CIA, Center for the Study of Intelligence, CIA Air Operations in Laos, 1955-1974. Photo courtesy of D. Williams.)

On February 12, 1970, "the communists attacked irregular units on the Plain of Jars, and Souvanna Phouma, presumably encouraged by Ambassador Godley, formally requested B-52 support. Nixon granted it, and on the night of 17 February, three bombers hit the advancing North Vietnamese. Photographs and ground observation revealed grievous enemy losses, despite the time for preparation afforded them by information leaked through insecure FAR radio communications."

Regarding CIA presence by the end of the war; by the summer of 1970, the airline had some two dozen twin-engine transports, another two dozen short-takeoff-and-landing (STOL) aircraft, and some 30 helicopters dedicated to operations in Laos. There were more than 300 pilots, copilots, flight mechanics, and air-freight specialists flying out of Laos and Thailand. During 1970, Air America airdropped or landed 46 million pounds of foodstuffs—mainly rice—in Laos. Helicopter flight time reached more than 4,000 hours a month in the same year. Air America crews transported tens of thousands of troops and refugees, flew emergency medevac missions and rescued downed airmen throughout Laos, inserted and extracted road-watch teams, flew nighttime airdrop missions over the Ho Chi Minh Trail, monitored sensors along infiltration routes, conducted photo-reconnaissance and numerous clandestine missions.

In 1971 there were reports of the CIA send in 5,000~6,000 Thai troops into Laos into the southern region of Pakse and paid these troops extra money for there service in the region. The CIA did cover this large amount of troops as being ethnic Laotians, as well as being simply being reinforcements for regions inside Vietnam. this secret army was also used to sabotage the Ho Chi Minh trail. The monsoon season of 1971 saw the last major offensive operations by the Hmong, now assisted by growing numbers of Thai volunteer battalions, trained and paid by the CIA. Heavy fighting erupted in 1971 for control of the strategic Bolovens Plateau, with Air America providing the essential air transport for the CIA-led forces.

On April 21, 1972, the CIA was ordered to give up control of Air America and related companies. Air America dissolved upon the conclusion of the end of the American War in Southeast Asia. On April 24, 1971, the Air America vice president for flight operations sent a message warning all crew members that there had been an appalling number of deaths and serious injuries. According to the warning, the airlines was performing under the most difficult environmental conditions in the world. He warned them they should exercise extreme caution when conducting flight operations in Laos. Air America's vice president sent this message upon the assumption that Air America was thought to give relinquish control. On June 3, 1974, the last Air America aircraft crossed the border from Laos into Thailand.

In 1973, there was a report stating that "distrustful as always of FAR security practice, Vang Pao insisted that all forces committed to the new operation (dubbed ABOUT FACE) of Hmong SGUs, most of which was trying to fend off the North Vietnamese on the periphery of the Plain of Jars. Fully in sympathy with Vang Pao's aversion to including FAR-even assuming regular troops were available-Clyde McAvoy introduced an innovation that would become standard' practice until the February 1973 cease-fire."

== Legacy ==
Air America's public image has fared poorly due in part to the 1990 film Air America. Ultimately, the communist versus anti-communist war in Laos is depicted as a facade for the real war, which was fought for control of the area's opium fields.

U.S. bombing inflicted a large number of casualties during the Laotian Civil War. The U.S. dropped over 2 million tons on Laos between 1964 and 1973, making Laos the most heavily bombed country in history relative to the size of its population. The U.S. State Department's analysis has determined that about 30% of all bombs dropped on Laos failed to detonate. Unexploded ordnance remains dangerous to persons coming in contact, purposefully or accidentally, with bombs. According to a nationwide survey by Laotian government, casualties from explosive ordnance, mostly from U.S. bombing, during the civil war period between 1964 and 1975, are estimated at 30,000, while casualties since the end of the war from unexploded ordnance are estimated at 20,000. They estimate a total of 50,000 casualties from explosive ordnance, including 29,522 killed and 21,048 injured.

The United States has also been criticized for the way it abandoned thousands of Hmong fighters and their families at Long Tieng. Others claim the loss of life could have even been worse if not for some ingenuity on behalf of General Heinie Alderholt and the CIA's Jerry Daniels, who worked to secure a C-130 to evacuate as many Hmong from the airstrip as possible. Daniels later recalled the ordeal, "All was in turmoil ... We took off at 10:47 and this ended the CIA base at Long Tieng." Although around 3,000 of the Hmong were able to reach safety through United States transportation, tens of thousands were to remain, many of whom would end up in exile or refugee camps - their previous way of life, as CIA officer Dick Holm described, "has been destroyed."

The aftermath has resulted in a continuing question of whether the United States is responsible for providing further economic assistance to the people of Laos, not only for their fighting through CIA-led units but also for the bombing raids that killed thousands. Many continue to sharply criticize the events of the war in Laos, particularly the inclusion of fourteen-year-olds into the CIA-backed Hmong guerilla units. As one particular youth stated, "I'm not enjoying the war because I want to study and I want to know more, but the pressure pushes me to be a soldier."

In 2014, the United States gave the people of Laos $12 million to clear bombs from the war. As Senator Patrick Leahy (D-VT) stated, "The tragic legacy of cluster munitions in Laos is one that all Americans should care about. I hope the additional funds in the fiscal year 2014 will become part of a multi-year program to finally overcome this cruel history and enable the Laotian people to rebuild their lives."

As of 2015, only 1% of the bombed areas in Laos have been cleared for unexploded ordnance.

On September 6, 2016, United States president Barack Obama spoke in Vientiane Laos to an audience of 1,075. He acknowledged the "suffering and sacrifices on all sides of the conflict" and its "wrenching toll on innocent men, women and children". He doubled the yearly contribution of the dismantling of unexploded ordnance to 30 million a year for three years. He was the first sitting American president to visit Laos. Mr. Obama's visit along with the story of unexploded ordnance in Laos were told through the 2017 documentary feature film Blood Road. The film won several awards, including a News & Documentary Emmy award for the motion graphics created to illustrate the scope of these bombings and operations.

== See also ==
- Military Assistance Command, Vietnam – Studies and Observations Group
- Cold War
- Case–Church Amendment
- Hughes–Ryan Amendment
- Indochina Wars
- North Vietnamese invasion of Laos
- Operation Barrel Roll
