= Plausible deniability =

Ability to credibly deny responsibility or involvement

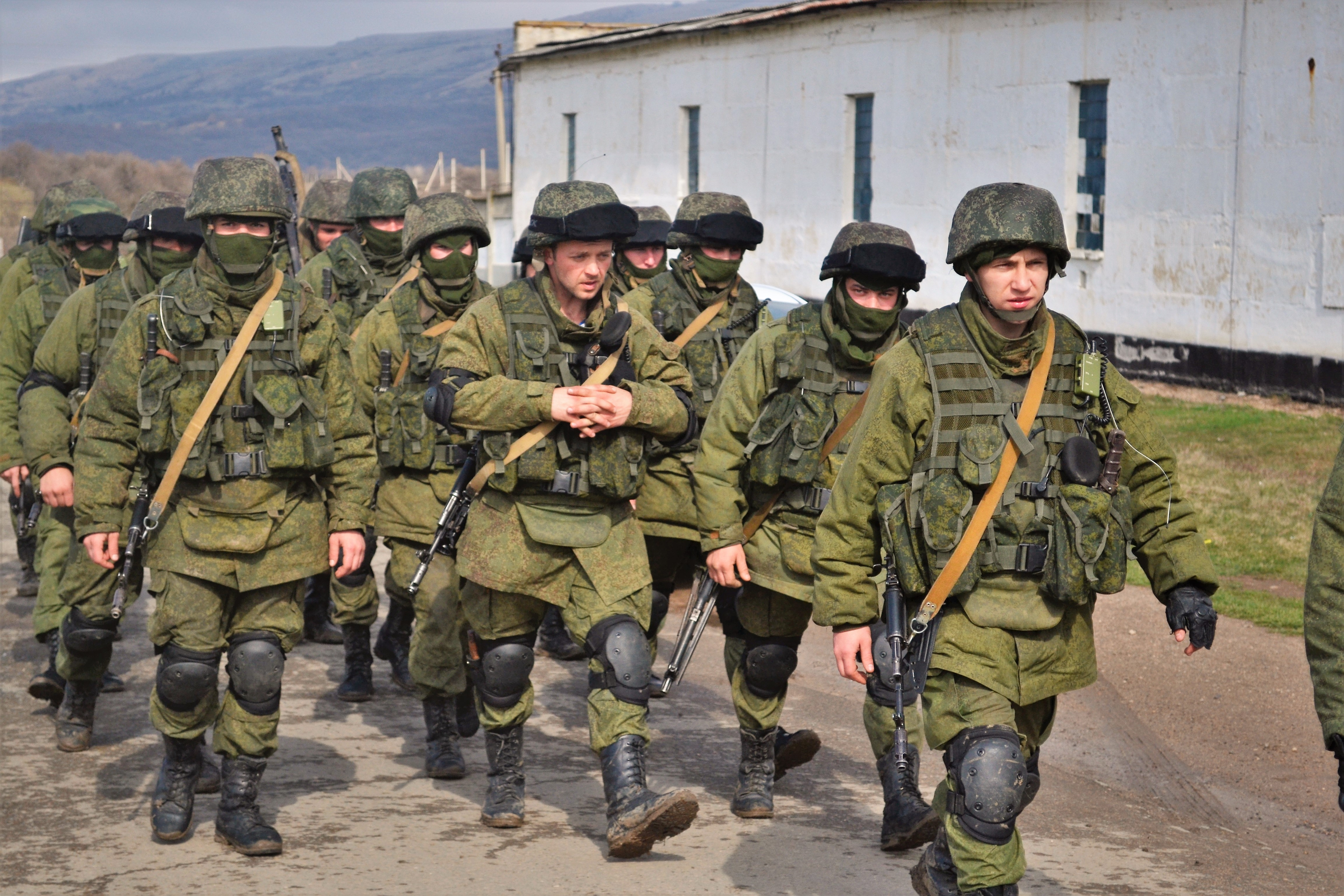
Russian soldiers with insignia-free uniforms during Russia's annexation of Crimea in 2014. Russia's use of these so-called "little green men" has been cited as an example of plausible deniability.

Plausible deniability is the ability of a person or organization to deny a connection (knowledge, responsibility, or involvement) to a controversial action in a manner that cannot be conclusively disproved. In politics and espionage, the term traditionally refers to the concealment or withholding of acknowledgement, of a sponsor's role in a covert operation, so that the sponsoring government can disclaim responsibility if the operation comes to light. In the study of language and communication, indirect speech and insinuation are analysed as ways for a speaker to preserve deniability about the intended meaning of an utterance.

The political concept is closely associated with the United States during the early Cold War. National Security Council directive NSC 10/2 of 1948 defined covert operations as activities planned and executed so that any US government responsibility for them "is not evident to unauthorized persons and that if uncovered the US Government can plausibly disclaim any responsibility for them". The expression gained public prominence in the mid-1970s, when the Church Committee of the US Senate concluded that the doctrine, originally intended to protect the United States from the consequences of disclosure, had been expanded to shield presidents and their senior staff from accountability for controversial decisions.

Scholars have questioned if plausible deniability can be practically achieved. Many covert operations have their sponsorship apparent although officially unacknowledged, and states have sometimes derived value from such "implausibly deniable" action, for example by signalling resolve to an adversary while limiting pressure to escalate. In pragmatics, researchers have examined how even thinly veiled innuendo retains a degree of deniability, and why denials of an insinuated message can succeed even when the message was understood by everyone involved.

== Overview ==
Arguably, the key concept of plausible deniability is plausibility. It is relatively easy for a government official to issue a blanket denial of an action, and it is possible to destroy or cover up evidence after the fact, that might be sufficient to avoid a criminal prosecution, for instance. However, the public might well disbelieve the denial, particularly if there is strong circumstantial evidence or if the action is believed to be so unlikely that the only logical explanation is that the denial is false.

The concept is even more important in espionage. Intelligence may come from many sources, including human sources. The exposure of information to which only a few people are privileged may directly implicate some of the people in the disclosure. An example is if an official is traveling secretly, and only one aide knows the specific travel plans. If that official is assassinated during his travels, and the circumstances of the assassination strongly suggest that the assassin had foreknowledge of the official's travel plans, the probable conclusion is that his aide has betrayed the official. There may be no direct evidence linking the aide to the assassin, but collaboration can be inferred from the facts alone, thus making the aide's denial implausible.

== History ==
The term's roots go back to US President Harry Truman's National Security Council Paper 10/2 of June 18, 1948, which defined "covert operations" as "all activities (except as noted herein) which are conducted or sponsored by this Government against hostile foreign states or groups or in support of friendly foreign states or groups but which are so planned and executed that any US Government responsibility for them is not evident to unauthorized persons and that if uncovered the US Government can plausibly disclaim any responsibility for them." During the Eisenhower administration, NSC 10/2 was incorporated into the more-specific NSC 5412/2 "Covert Operations." NSC 5412 was declassified in 1977 and is located at the National Archives.

The expression "plausibly deniable" was first used publicly by Central Intelligence Agency (CIA) Director Allen Dulles. The idea, however, is considerably older. For example, in the 19th century, Charles Babbage described the importance of having "a few simply honest men" on a committee who could be temporarily removed from the deliberations when "a peculiarly delicate question arises" so that one of them could "declare truly, if necessary, that he never was present at any meeting at which even a questionable course had been proposed."

=== Church Committee ===
The Church Committee of the U.S. Senate conducted an investigation of the intelligence agencies in 1974–1975. In the course of the investigation, it was revealed that the CIA, going back to the Kennedy administration, had plotted the assassination of a number of foreign leaders, including Cuba's Fidel Castro, but the president himself, who clearly supported such actions, was not to be directly involved so that he could deny knowledge of it. That was given the term "plausible denial."

Non-attribution to the United States for covert operations was the original and principal purpose of the so-called doctrine of "plausible denial." Evidence before the Committee clearly demonstrates that this concept, designed to protect the United States and its operatives from the consequences of disclosures, has been expanded to mask decisions of the president and his senior staff members.

— Church Committee

Plausible denial involves the creation of power structures and chains of command loose and informal enough to be denied if necessary. The idea was that the CIA and later other bodies could be given controversial instructions by powerful figures, including the president himself, but that the existence and true source of those instructions could be denied if necessary if, for example, an operation went disastrously wrong and it was necessary for the administration to disclaim responsibility.

=== Later legislative barriers ===
The Hughes–Ryan Act of 1974 sought to put an end to plausible denial by requiring a presidential finding for each operation to be important to national security, and the Intelligence Oversight Act of 1980 required for Congress to be notified of all covert operations. Both laws, however, are full of enough vague terms and escape hatches to allow the executive branch to thwart their authors' intentions, as was shown by the Iran–Contra affair. Indeed, the members of Congress are in a dilemma since when they are informed, they are in no position to stop the action, unless they leak its existence and thereby foreclose the option of covertness.

=== Media reports ===
The (Church Committee) conceded that to provide the United States with "plausible denial" in the event that the anti-Castro plots were discovered, Presidential authorization might have been subsequently "obscured". (The Church Committee) also declared that, whatever the extent of the knowledge, Presidents Eisenhower, Kennedy and Johnson should bear the "ultimate responsibility" for the actions of their subordinates.

— John M. Crewdson, The New York Times

CIA officials deliberately used Aesopian language in talking to the President and others outside the agency. (Richard Helms) testified that he did not want to "embarrass a President" or sit around an official table talking about "killing or murdering." The report found this "circumlocution" reprehensible, saying: "Failing to call dirty business by its rightful name may have increased the risk of dirty business being done." The committee also suggested that the system of command and control may have been deliberately ambiguous, to give Presidents a chance for "plausible denial."

— Anthony Lewis, The New York Times

What made the responsibility difficult to pin down in retrospect was a sophisticated system of institutionalized vagueness and circumlocution whereby no official - and particularly a President - had to officially endorse questionable activities. Unsavory orders were rarely committed to paper and what record the committee found was shot through with references to "removal," "the magic button" and "the resort beyond the last resort." Thus the agency might at times have misread instructions from on high, but it seemed more often to be easing the burden of presidents who knew there were things they didn't want to know. As former CIA director Richard Helms told the committee: "The difficulty with this kind of thing, as you gentlemen are all painfully aware, is that nobody wants to embarrass a President of the United States."

— Newsweek

=== Iran–Contra affair ===
In his testimony to the congressional committee studying the Iran–Contra affair, Vice Admiral John Poindexter stated: "I made a deliberate decision not to ask the President, so that I could insulate him from the decision and provide some future deniability for the President if it ever leaked out."

=== Declassified government documents ===
- A telegram from the Ambassador in Vietnam Henry Cabot Lodge Jr., to Special Assistant for National Security Affairs McGeorge Bundy on US options with respect to a possible coup, mentions plausible denial.
- CIA and White House documents on covert political intervention in the 1964 Chilean election have been declassified. The CIA's Chief of Western Hemisphere Division, J.C. King, recommended for funds for the campaign to "be provided in a fashion causing (Eduardo Frei Montalva president of Chile) to infer United States origin of funds and yet permitting plausible denial."
- Training files of the CIA's covert "Operation PBSuccess" for the 1954 coup in Guatemala describe plausible deniability. According to the National Security Archive: "Among the documents found in the training files of Operation PBSuccess and declassified by the Agency is a CIA document titled 'A Study of Assassination.' A how-to guide book in the art of political killing, the 19-page manual offers detailed descriptions of the procedures, instruments, and implementation of assassination." The manual states that to provide plausible denial, "no assassination instructions should ever be written or recorded."

=== Soviet operations ===
In the 1980s, the Soviet KGB ran OPERATION INFEKTION (also called "OPERATION DENVER"), which utilised the East German Stasi and Soviet-affiliated press to spread the idea that HIV/AIDS was an engineered bioweapon. The Stasi acquired plausible deniability on the operation by covertly supporting biologist Jakob Segal, whose stories were picked up by international press, including "numerous bourgeois newspapers" such as the Sunday Express. Publications in third-party countries were then cited as the originators of the claims. Meanwhile, Soviet intelligence obtained plausible deniability by utilising the German Stasi in the disinformation operation.

=== Little green men and Wagner Group ===
In 2014, "Little green men"—troops without insignia carrying modern Russian military equipment—emerged at the start of the Russo-Ukrainian War, which The Moscow Times described as a tactic of plausible deniability.

The Wagner Group, a Russian private military company, has been described as an attempt at plausible deniability for Kremlin-backed interventions in Ukraine, Syria, and in various interventions in Africa.

== Flaws ==
- It is an open door to the abuse of authority by requiring that the parties in question to be said to be able to have acted independently, which, in the end, is tantamount to giving them license to act independently.
- The denials are sometimes seen as plausible but seen through by both the media and the populace.
- Plausible deniability increases the risk of misunderstanding between senior officials and their employees.

== Other examples ==
=== Council on Foreign Relations ===
...the U.S. government may at times require a certain deniability. Private activities can provide that deniability.

— Council on Foreign Relations, Finding America's Voice: A Strategy for Reinvigorating U.S. Public Diplomacy

=== Use in computer networks ===
In computer networks, plausible deniability often refers to a situation in which people can deny transmitting a file, even when it is proven to come from their computer.

That is sometimes done by setting the computer to relay certain types of broadcasts automatically in such a way that the original transmitter of a file is indistinguishable from those who are merely relaying it. In that way, those who first transmitted the file can claim that their computer had merely relayed it from elsewhere. This principle is used in the opentracker bittorrent implementation by including random IP addresses in peer lists.

In encrypted messaging protocols, such as bitmessage, every user on the network keeps a copy of every message, but is only able to decrypt their own and that can only be done by trying to decrypt every single message. Using this approach it is impossible to determine who sent a message to whom without being able to decrypt it. As everyone receives everything and the outcome of the decryption process is kept private.

It can also be done by a VPN if the host is not known.

In any case, that claim cannot be disproven without a complete decrypted log of all network connections.

==== Hyphanet file sharing ====
The Hyphanet file sharing network is another application of the idea by obfuscating data sources and flows to protect operators and users of the network by preventing them and, by extension, observers such as censors from knowing where data comes from and where it is stored.

=== Use in cryptography ===
In cryptography, deniable encryption may be used to describe steganographic techniques in which the very existence of an encrypted file or message is deniable in the sense that an adversary cannot prove that an encrypted message exists. In that case, the system is said to be "fully undetectable".

Some systems take this further, such as MaruTukku, FreeOTFE and (to a much lesser extent) TrueCrypt and VeraCrypt, which nest encrypted data. The owner of the encrypted data may reveal one or more keys to decrypt certain information from it, and then deny that more keys exist, a statement which cannot be disproven without knowledge of all encryption keys involved. The existence of "hidden" data within the overtly encrypted data is then deniable in the sense that it cannot be proven to exist.

“Trepidation of Relationship” and “Trepidation of Memory” are two further cryptographical concepts to discuss plausible deniability, as also compared in a Youtube-Audio-Podcast.

- "Trepidation of Memory“ refers to the temporal decoupling of key pairs. In the book “Super Secreto” by Theo Tenzer, the developer Textbrowser's idea for the Spot-On Encryption Suite application describes how the assignment of public and private keys can become blurred over time. The use of ephemeral keys, which only exist temporarily, makes the traceability of communication more difficult. The collision of two asteroids is used as a figurative analogy: After the collision, the two original objects are no longer identifiable as they have disintegrated into individual parts and are moving away from each other. The new paradigm is to separate public and private keys again after they have been used, in the case of asymmetric encryption, or to remove the temporary, ephemeral key from the content in the case of symmetric encryption.
- "Trepidation of Relationship” builds on this concept and refers to the relationships between users in a network. The use of human proxies, i.e. friends in the messenger's friends list who forward messages on behalf of others, makes it more difficult to *identify the actual sender*. This innovative concept has been implemented in the messenger Spot-On Encryption Suite by the developer Textbrowser and then described in the book Human Proxies by Uni Nurf. Human Proxies offer new directions to end-to-end encryption: End-A-to-End-Z encryption must be rethought when it turns out to be an End-B-to-End-Z encryption. Since the key exchange with the proxy may have taken place in the past, the relationship may not be recognizable to external analysts if a user uses an old friend who has not been contacted or chatted with for a long time as a human proxy. The construct of the *Inner Envelope* behind the Human Proxy function also creates new cryptographic challenges, provides plausible deniability to included nodes, and offers new perspectives in encryption, its analysis and decryption: As all messages in the network are encrypted, end-to-end encryption is new defined and gets with Human Proxies a potential second and plausible deniable start point.

These cryptographic concepts serve to protect privacy and increase security in networks. They make mass surveillance more difficult and enable plausible deniability. Both concepts can be summarized as follows:

- Trepidation of Memory: Makes it difficult to trace key pairs back in time.
- Trepidation of Relationship: Makes it difficult to identify communication relationships in a network.

=== Programming ===
The Underhanded C Contest was an annual programming contest involving the creation of carefully crafted defects, which have to be both very hard to find and plausibly deniable as mistakes once found.

== See also ==
- Black op
- Blue wall of silence
- Buck passing
- Church Committee
- Clandestine operation
- Deniable encryption
- Equivocation
- Malicious compliance
- Lone wolf terrorism
- Stalking horse
- Will no one rid me of this turbulent priest?
- Willful ignorance
- Willful violation
- Glossary of military abbreviations
- List of established military terms
- List of military tactics

== Sources ==
- Camp, Elisabeth (2018). "Insinuation, common ground, and the conversational record" (PDF). In Fogal, Daniel; Harris, Daniel W.; Moss, Matt (eds.). New Work on Speech Acts. Oxford: Oxford University Press. pp. 40–66. doi:10.1093/oso/9780198738831.003.0002. ISBN 978-0-19-873883-1.
- Cormac, Rory; Aldrich, Richard J. (2018). "Grey is the new black: covert action and implausible deniability". International Affairs. 94 (3): 477–494. doi:10.1093/ia/iiy067.
- Dinges, Alexander; Zakkou, Julia (2023). "On deniability". Mind. 132 (526): 372–401. doi:10.1093/mind/fzac056.
- Lee, James J.; Pinker, Steven (2010). "Rationales for indirect speech: the theory of the strategic speaker" (PDF). Psychological Review. 117 (3): 785–807. doi:10.1037/a0019688. PMID 20658853.
