= Dick Holm =

U.S. intelligence officer

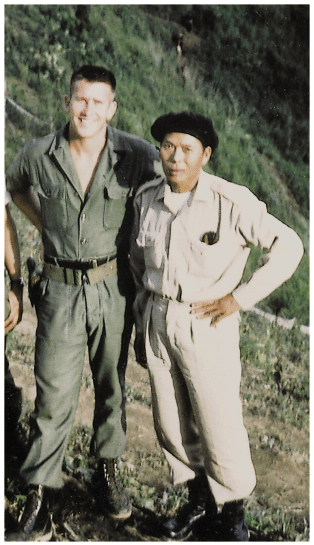
Richard L. Holm and a Hmong resistance fighter in Laos in mid-1962

Dick Holm, also known as Richard L. Holm, was an American CIA Operations Officer who served under 13 CIA directors and was awarded with the Distinguished Intelligence Medal, the CIA's highest award.

== Career ==
=== Early career and plane crash ===
Holm joined the CIA in 1961, and in his first assignment served in the CIA's secret war in Laos against the communists in the lead-up to the Vietnam War. Holm was then posted to the Congo and suffered near-fatal burns over 35% of his body from a plane crash. His horrific burns were treated by local tribesmen with a black paste made of snake oil and tree bark. He remained in their care for 10 days until he was finally rescued and quickly sent back to America for medical care.

=== Return to service ===
His body permanently scarred, Holm returned to service after two years of extensive medical care in the United States, serving for several more decades in the CIA and achieving legendary status within the Agency. Holm was stationed in Hong Kong from 1970 to 1973 and 1978 to 1981. Holm served as station chief in Brussels from 1985 to 1988. He was instrumental in anti–terrorism operations during Carlos the Jackal’s international terror campaign.

=== Paris ===
Holm's final assignment was Chief of the CIA Station in Paris, where he was held responsible when French authorities uncovered a CIA operation involving economic espionage. In the operation, a female American CIA undercover operative, posing as the representative of a US non-profit, enjoyed clandestine meetings with a French official to obtain secret trade information. The American operative fell in love with the French official and allegedly behaved irresponsibly, her lack of discretion leading to the discovery of the operation. Holm was publicly expelled by the French Government along with several other CIA agents posing as diplomats; Holm denied responsibility by claiming the American operative hid her romantic relationship with the French official from the CIA. According to Christopher Lynch, Dick Holm unfairly made the American operative the scapegoat for a series of problems at the station despite her having '"had little or nothing to do with some of the cases and officers involved."

== Legacy ==
In 2004, Holm published his memoirs, The American Agent (ISBN 1-903608-14-7). Another volume of his memoirs, The Craft We Chose: My Life in the CIA, was published in August 2011 by Mountain Lake Press (ISBN 978-0-9814773-7-4).

Holm's life in the Central Intelligence Agency is being chronicled in the 2015 documentary film Back to the Shadows: A CIA Officer's Story.
