= Intelligence Oversight Act =

United States Law

- Other short titles: National Intelligence Act of 1980
- Long title: An Act to authorize the intelligence system of the United States by the establishment of a statutory basis for the national intelligence activities of the United States, and for other purposes.
- Acronyms (colloquial): IOA
- Nicknames: Intelligence Oversight Act of 1980
- Enacted by: the 96th United States Congress

Legislative history
- Introduced in the Senate as S. 2284 by Walter Dee Huddleston (D–KY) on February 8, 1980; Committee consideration by Senate Intelligence, House Foreign Affairs, House Intelligence (Permanent); Passed the Senate on June 3, 1980 (89-1)

The Intelligence Oversight Act of 1980 is a United States federal law that amended the Hughes–Ryan Act and requires United States government agencies to report covert actions to the House Permanent Select Committee on Intelligence (HPSCI) and the Senate Select Committee on Intelligence (SSCI). The previous requirement to notify six to eight other committees was eliminated.

Enacted on September 21, 1980, The Intelligence Oversight Act of 1980 provided that the heads of intelligence agencies would keep the oversight committees "fully and currently informed" of their activities including "any significant anticipated intelligence activity." Detailed ground rules were established for reporting covert actions to the Congress, in return for the number of congressional committees receiving notice of covert actions being limited to the two oversight committees.

== See also ==
- Hughes–Ryan Act
- Church Committee
