= Case–Church Amendment =

United States Law limiting further involvement in Vietnam, Laos and Cambodia

- Other short titles: Case–Church Amendment of 1973
- Long title: A joint resolution making continuing appropriations for the fiscal year 1974, and for other purposes.
- Enacted by: the 93rd United States Congress
- Effective: July 1, 1973

Citations
- Public law: 93-52
- Statutes at Large: 87 Stat. 130

Codification
- Titles amended: 22 U.S.C.: Foreign Relations and Intercourse
- U.S.C. sections amended: 22 U.S.C. ch. 32 §§ 2151, 2751

Legislative history
- Introduced in the House as H.J.Res. 636 by George H. Mahon (D–TX) on June 25, 1973; Committee consideration by House Appropriations, Senate Appropriations; Passed the House on June 26, 1973 (325–86); Passed the Senate on June 29, 1973 (73–16); Reported by the joint conference committee on June 30, 1973; agreed to by the House on June 30, 1973 (266–75) and by the Senate on June 30, 1973 (agreed); Signed into law by President Richard Nixon on July 1, 1973

The Case–Church Amendment was proposed as an amendment to several appropriations bills funding various departments of the United States Government in 1972 and 1973. The first version actually to become law, passed by both houses of the Congress on June 29, 1973, and signed by President Richard Nixon on July 1, read: "None of the funds herein appropriated under this Act may be expended to support directly or indirectly combat activities in or over Cambodia, Laos, North Vietnam and South Vietnam or off the shores of Cambodia, Laos, North Vietnam and South Vietnam by United States forces, and after August 15, 1973, no other funds heretofore appropriated under any other act may be expended for such purpose." Despite this amendment, the US continued to provide military equipment and economic support to the governments of Cambodia, Laos, and South Vietnam. The amendment is named for its principal co-sponsors, Senators Clifford P. Case (R–NJ) and Frank Church (D–ID).

The amendment was defeated 48–42 in the US Senate in August 1972, but revived after the 1972 election. It was reintroduced on January 26, 1973 and approved by the Senate Foreign Relations Committee on May 13. When it became apparent that the amendment would pass, President Richard Nixon and Secretary of State Henry Kissinger, lobbied frantically to have the deadline extended.

However, under pressure from the extreme scrutiny of Watergate, Republicans relented on support for South Vietnam, and the amendment passed the United States Congress in June 1973 by a margin of 325–86 in the House, 73–16 in the Senate. Both of these margins for the amendment's passage were greater than the two-thirds majority required to override a presidential veto, and Nixon signed it on July 1, 1973.

The last US forces had been withdrawn from South Vietnam in March 1973 pursuant to the Paris Peace Accords on Vietnam, which was signed on January 27 with a ceasefire taking effect the following day. US bombing had ended on January 28 in Vietnam and in April in Laos, though bombing continued in Cambodia. US bombing in Cambodia ended on August 15, 1973, the deadline set by the Case–Church Amendment. Under the subsequent War Powers Resolution taking effect in November, the US President can send armed forces into action abroad only by Congress’s statutory authorization, or in case of "a national emergency created by attack upon the United States, its territories or possessions, or its armed forces". This loss of US support was one of the reasons for the collapse of the governments of Cambodia, South Vietnam, and Laos in 1975.

== See also ==
- Vietnam War
- Cambodian Civil War
- Laotian Civil War
- Fall of Saigon
- Opposition to the Vietnam War
