= Cambodian genocide denial =

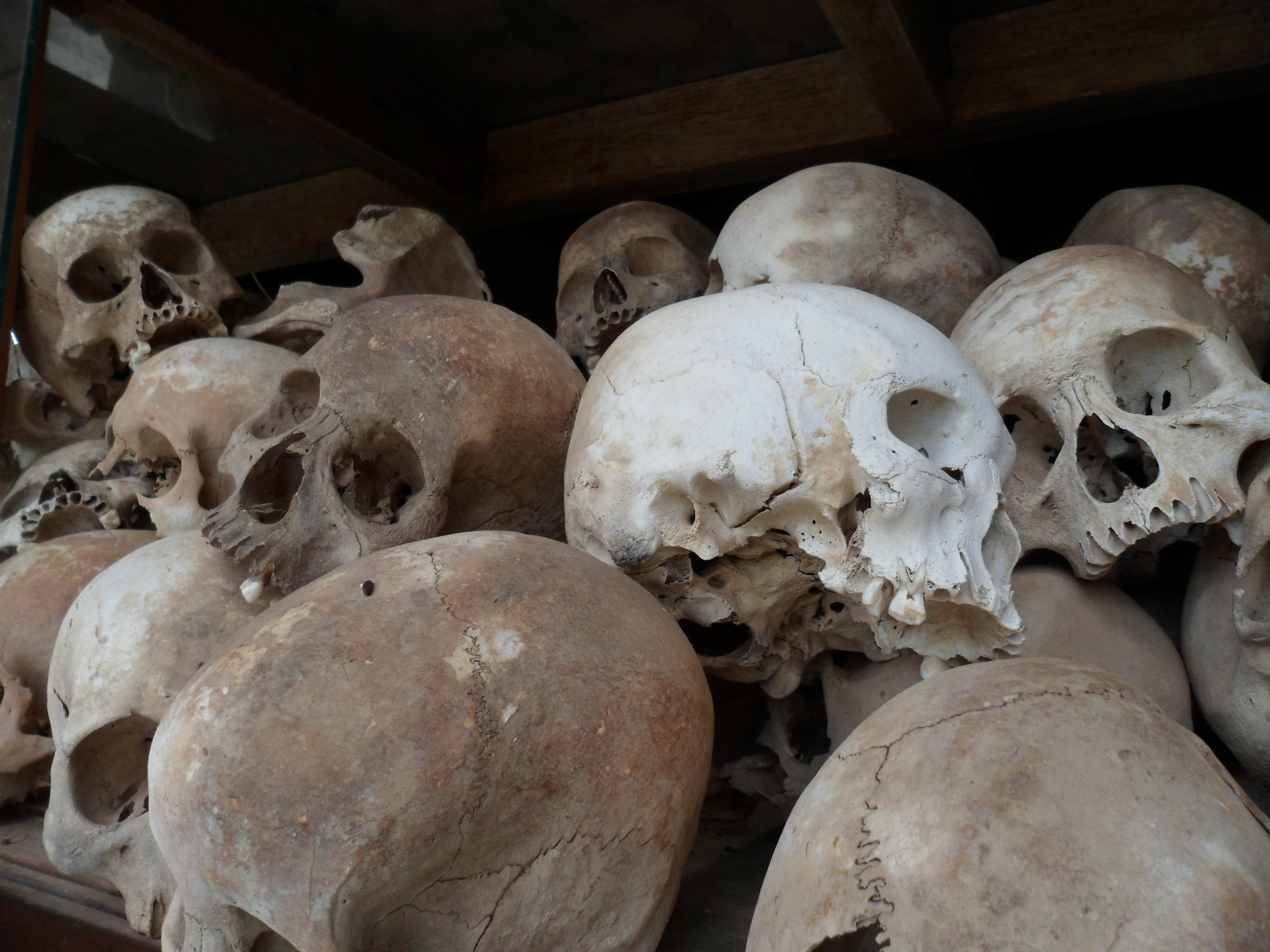
Skulls of victims of the Khmer Rouge at Tuol Sleng Genocide Museum

Cambodian genocide denial is the belief expressed by some academics that early claims of atrocities committed by the Khmer Rouge government (1975–1979) in Democratic Kampuchea were exaggerated. Many scholars of Cambodia and intellectuals opposed to the United States involvement in the Vietnam War denied or minimized reports of human rights abuses of the Khmer Rouge, characterizing contrary reports as "tales told by refugees" and US propaganda. They viewed the assumption of power by the Communist Party of Kampuchea as a positive development for the people of Cambodia who had been severely impacted by the Vietnam War and the Cambodian Civil War.

Scholar Donald W. Beachler, writing of the controversy about the range and extent of Khmer Rouge atrocities, concluded that "much of the posturing by academics, publicists, and politicians seems to have been motivated largely by political purposes" rather than concern for the Cambodian people. Cambodian scholar Sophal Ear has titled the pro-Khmer Rouge academics as the "Standard Total Academic View on Cambodia" (STAV).

With conclusive evidence, including the discovery of over 20,000 mass graves, of a large number of deaths—estimated at between one and three million—of Cambodians caused by the Khmer Rouge, denials, deniers, and apologists largely disappeared, although disagreements concerning the actual number of Khmer Rouge victims have continued.

== Overview ==
=== Background ===
The Khmer Rouge captured Phnom Penh, the capital of Cambodia, on 17 April 1975, and immediately ordered all the residents to evacuate the city. Between two and three million residents of Phnom Penh, Battambang, and other large towns were forced by the Communists to walk into the countryside without organized provision for food, water, shelter, physical security, or medical care. The evacuation probably resulted in at least 100,000 deaths. The dispossessed urban dwellers were assigned to re-education camps or "New Settlements." Former government employees and soldiers were executed. Soon, according to journalists, Cambodia resembled "a giant prison camp with the urban supporters of the former regime being worked to death on thin gruel and hard labor."

The Khmer Rouge guarded the border with Thailand and only a few thousand refugees were able to make their way to safety in Thailand. As virtually no Westerners were allowed to visit Cambodia, those refugees plus the official news outlets of the Khmer Rouge were the principal sources of information about conditions in Cambodia for the next four years.

Within one day of the Communists taking power, Fernand Scheller, chief of the United Nations development project in Phnom Penh stated, "What the Khmer Rouge are doing is pure genocide. ... What is going on now is an example of demagoguery that makes one vomit."

=== "Standard Total Academic View on Cambodia" ===
Donald W. Beachler has described the late 1970s debate about the character of the Khmer Rouge as follows:

Many of those who had been opponents of U.S. military actions in Vietnam and Cambodia feared that the tales of murder and deprivation under the Khmer Rouge regime would validate the claims of those who had supported U.S. government actions aimed at halting the spread of communism. Conservatives pointed to the actions of the Khmer Rouge as proof of the inherent evils of communism and evidence that the U.S. had been right to fight its long war against communists in Southeast Asia.

Despite the eye-witness accounts by journalists prior to their expulsion during the first few days of Khmer Rouge rule, and the later testimony of refugees; many academics in the United States, United Kingdom, France, Australia, and other countries portrayed the Khmer Rouge favorably or at least were skeptical about the stories of Khmer Rouge atrocities. None of them, however, were allowed to visit Cambodia until the final few days of Khmer Rouge rule (except Gunnar Bergstrom, president of the Sweden–Kampuchea Friendship Association) and few actually talked to the refugees whose stories they believed to be exaggerated or false. According to Joel Brinkley, "Khmer Rouge apologists easily outnumbered those who believed a tragedy was under way."

Some Western scholars believed that the Khmer Rouge would free Cambodia from colonialism, capitalism, and the ravages of American bombing and invasion during the Vietnam War. Cambodian scholar Sophal Ear has titled the pro-Khmer Rouge intelligentsia the "Standard Total Academic View on Cambodia" (STAV). The STAV, which he said included among its adherents almost all Cambodian scholars in the Western world, "hoped for, more than anything, a socialist success story with all the romantic ingredients of peasants, fighting imperialism, and revolution." Author William Shawcross was another critic of the STAV academics. Shawcross's views were endorsed and summarized by human-rights activist David Hawk, who claimed that the West was indifferent to the atrocities taking place in Cambodia due to "the influence of anti-war academics on the American left who obfuscated Khmer Rouge behavior, denigrated the post-1975 refugee reports, and denounced the journalists who got those stories."

The controversy concerning the Khmer Rouge intensified in February 1977 with the publication of excerpts in Reader's Digest magazine from a book by John Barron and Anthony Paul called Peace With Horror: The Untold Story of Communist Genocide in Cambodia (printed in the US as Murder Of A Gentle Land). Based on extensive interviews with Cambodian refugees in Thailand, Barron and Paul estimated that, out of a total population of about 7 million people, 1.2 million Cambodians had died of starvation, over-work, or execution during less than two years of Khmer Rouge rule. Published about the same time was the book Cambodge Année Zéro (Cambodia: Year Zero) by François Ponchaud, a French priest who had lived in Cambodia and spoke Khmer. He also painted a picture of mass deaths caused by the Khmer Rouge, and asked: "How many of those who say they are unreservedly in support of the Khmer revolution would consent to endure one hundredth part of the present sufferings of the Cambodian people?"

French scholar, Jean Lacouture, formerly a fervent sympathizer of the Khmer Rouge, reviewed Ponchaud's book favorably in The New York Review of Books on 31 March 1977. In 1978, Lacouture wrote Cambodians Survive!, in which he said:

The shame, alone, would have justified that this book be written—which is firstly a cry of horror. The shame of having contributed, even as little as it was, as weak as its influence could have been on the mass media, to the establishment of one of the most oppressive powers history has ever known.

Sections of the academic left in the West dismissed and/or opposed both Ponchaud's and Barron and Paul's books; Noam Chomsky called the latter book a "third rate propaganda tract." Gareth Porter was the most outspoken of the dissenting academics. In 1976, he and George Hildebrand co-authored Cambodia: Starvation and Revolution, in which Porter characterized the accounts of a million-or-more dead Cambodians as wildly exaggerated. Testifying before the U.S Congress in 1977, Porter stated, "I cannot accept the premise…that one million people have been murdered systematically or that the Government of Cambodia is systematically slaughtering its people." Regarding Porter and Hildebrand's 1976 book, Shawcross wrote a review in which he stated that the authors' "use of evidence can be seriously questioned," and that "their apparent faith in Khmer Rouge assertions and statistics is surprising in two men who have spent so long analyzing the lies that governments tell."

In addition to Chomsky, Porter, and Hildebrand, the atrocities of the Khmer Rouge have also been denied and/or whitewashed by such academics as Marxist scholar Malcolm Caldwell, Laura Summers, Edward S. Herman, and Torben Retbøll.

== Samir Amin ==
Egyptian-French economist Samir Amin was long an influence on and supporter of the leaders of the Khmer Rouge regime, becoming acquainted with the Khmer Rouge's future leaders in post-World War II Paris, where Pol Pot, Khieu Samphan, and other Cambodian students were studying. Khieu Samphan's doctoral thesis, which he finished in 1959, noted collaborations with Amin and claimed to apply Amin's theories to Cambodia. In the late 1970s, Amin praised the Khmer Rouge as superior to Marxist movements in China, Vietnam, or the Soviet Union, and recommended the Khmer Rouge model for Africa.

Amin continued to actively praise the Khmer Rouge into the 1980s. At a 1981 talk in Tokyo, Amin praised Pol Pot's work as "one of the major successes of the struggle for socialism in our era" and as necessary against "expansionism" from the Soviet Union or from Vietnam. Some scholars, such as Marxist anthropologist Kathleen Gough, have noted that Khmer Rouge activists in Paris in the 1950s already held ideas of eliminating counter-revolutionaries and organizing a party center whose decisions could not be questioned. Despite contemporary reports of mass killings committed by the Khmer Rouge, Amin argued in 1986 that "the cause of the most evil to the people of Kampuchea" lay elsewhere:

The humanitarian argument is in the final analysis the argument offered by all the colonialists ... Isn't [the cause of evil] first of all the American imperialists and Lon Nol? Isn't it today the Vietnamese army and their project of colonizing Kampuchea?

== Solarz hearing ==
On 3 May 1977, Congressman Stephen Solarz led a hearing on Cambodia in the United States House of Representatives. The witnesses were John Barron and three academics who specialized in Cambodia: David P. Chandler, who would become perhaps the most prominent American scholar of Cambodia; Peter Poole; and Gareth Porter. Chandler believed that "bloodbath" was an accurate description of the situation and by no means an exaggeration.

Porter again stated that the tales of Khmer Rouge atrocities were much exaggerated: "I cannot accept the premise…that one million people have been murdered systematically or that the Government of Cambodia is systematically slaughtering its people." Porter described the stories by refugees of Khmer Rouge atrocities collected by Barron and others as second-hand and hearsay. Asked for his sources, Porter cited the works of Ben Kiernan, who as a student was an editor for a pro-Khmer Rouge publication in Australia. Porter never mentioned having spoken to any Cambodian refugees to evaluate their stories personally.

Solarz, who had visited Cambodian refugee camps and listened to refugees' stories of Khmer Rouge atrocities, characterized justifications and explanations during the hearing about the Khmer Rouge as "cowardly and contemptible" and compared them to the justifications of the murder of Jews by Adolf Hitler during World War II.

== Chomsky and Herman ==
=== 1977 The Nation article ===
On 6 June 1977, Noam Chomsky and Edward S. Herman published an article in The Nation that contrasted the views expressed in the books of John Barron and Anthony Paul, François Ponchaud, and Gareth Porter and George Hildebrand, as well as in articles and accounts by Fox Butterfield, Carol Bragg (eyewitness testimony), Asian scholar George Kahin, J.J. Cazaux, Sydney Schanberg, Swedish journalist Olle Tolgraven, and others. Their conclusion was:

We do not pretend to know where the truth lies amidst these sharply conflicting assessments; rather, we again want to emphasize some crucial points. What filters through to the American public is a seriously distorted version of the evidence available, emphasizing alleged Khmer Rouge atrocities and downplaying or ignoring the crucial U.S. role, direct and indirect, in the torment that Cambodia has suffered.

Chomsky and Herman had both faint praise and criticism for Ponchaud's book Cambodia: Year Zero, writing on the one hand that it was "serious and worth reading, as distinct from much of the commentary it has elicited", and on the other that "the serious reader will find much to make him somewhat wary." They wrote that the refugee stories of Khmer Rouge atrocities "must be considered seriously", but should be treated with great "care and caution" because "refugees are frightened and defenseless, at the mercy of alien forces. They naturally tend to report what they believe their interlocuters wish to hear."

In the article, Chomsky and Herman described the book by Gareth Porter and George Hildebrand, as a "carefully documented study of the destructive American impact on Cambodia and the success of the Cambodian revolutionaries in overcoming it, giving a very favorable picture of their programs and policies, based on a wide range of sources". Chomsky also attacked testimonials from refugees regarding the massacres, calling into question the claims of hundreds of thousands killed. Chomsky does this on the basis of pointing to other first hand accounts that show killings more in the hundreds or thousands. He does not deny the existence of any executions outright. According to historian Peter Maguire, for many years Chomsky served as a "hit man" against media outlets which criticized the Khmer Rouge regime.

=== Later comments ===
In Manufacturing Consent (1988), Chomsky and Herman discussed the media reaction to their earlier writings on the Cambodian genocide. They summarised the position which they had taken in After the Cataclysm (1979):

As we also noted from the first paragraph of our earlier review of this material, to which we will simply refer here for specifics, “there is no difficulty in documenting major atrocities and oppression, primarily from the reports of refugees”; there is little doubt that “the record of atrocities in Cambodia is substantial and often gruesome” and represents “a fearful toll”; “when the facts are in, it may turn out that the more extreme condemnations were in fact correct,” although if so, “it will in no way alter the conclusions we have reached on the central question addressed here: how the available facts were selected, modified, or sometimes invented to create a certain image offered to the general population. The answer to this question seems clear, and it is unaffected by whatever may yet be discovered about Cambodia in the future.”

=== Responses to Chomsky and Herman ===
In the introduction to the American edition of his book, Ponchaud responded to a personal letter from Chomsky, saying,

With the responsible attitude and precision of thought that is so characteristic of him, Noam Chomsky then embarked on a polemical exchange with Robert Silvers, Editor of the NYR, and with Jean Lacouture, leading to the publication by the latter of a rectification of his initial account. Mr. Chomsky was of the opinion that Jean Lacouture had substantially distorted the evidence I had offered, and, considering my book to be "serious and worth reading, as distinct from much of the commentary it has elicited," he wrote me a letter on October 19, 1977 in which he drew my attention to the way [Year Zero] was being misused by anti-revolutionary propagandists. He has made it my duty to 'stem the flood of lies' about Cambodia – particularly, according to him, those propagated by Anthony Paul and John Barron in Murder of a Gentle Land.

Ponchaud wrote a different response to Chomsky in the British introduction to his book:

Even before this book was translated it was sharply criticized by Mr. Noam Chomsky ... and Mr. Gareth Porter ... These two 'experts' on Asia claim that I am mistakenly trying to convince people that Cambodia was drowned in a sea of blood after the departure of the last American diplomats. They say there have been no massacres, and they lay the blame for the tragedy of the Khmer people on the American bombings. They accuse me of being insufficiently critical in my approach to the refugee's accounts. For them, refugees are not a valid source ... it is surprising to see that 'experts' who have spoken to few if any refugees should reject their very significant place in any study of modern Cambodia. These experts would rather base their arguments on reasoning: if something seems impossible to their personal logic, then it doesn't exist. Their only sources for evaluation are deliberately chosen official statements. Where is that critical approach which they accuse others of not having?

Scholar of Cambodian History Michael Vickery, citing his own collection of refugee testimony in the Khao I Dang camp on the Thai border, concluded that Chomsky and Herman's criticism of Barron and Paul as well as Ponchaud had been correct, stating:

The accumulated evidence about DK indicates that even if true-believer enthusiasm for the Cambodian revolution was misplaced, the serious criticism of the STV [i.e. the view given by Barron and Paul or Ponchaud] in 1975–76 was reasonable and largely correct. It is also true that throughout 1977–78 evidence supporting a picture like that presented by Barron and Paul and Ponchaud increased and was apparently confirmed at last by the evidence from Vietnam, a once fraternal Communist regime, which in publicizing the conflicts erupting with Cambodia recounted horrors the equal of any found in the Western press during the previous two to three years. There could hardly any longer be serious doubt that the DK regime, however it started out, had become something very much like that depicted in the STV. We know now, however, that it was not just an increase in evidence about an already existing situation, but that things really changed in 1977. In 1975–76 the STV was simply not a true picture of the country, and conditions could reasonably be explained as inevitable results of wartime destruction and disorganization. From 1977, on the other hand, DK chose to engage in policies which caused increasing and unnecessary hardship. Thus the evidence for 1977–78 does not retrospectively justify the STV in 1975–76, and the Vietnamese adoption of some of the worst Western propaganda stories as support for their case in 1979 does not prove that those stories were valid.

Cambodia scholar Bruce Sharp criticized Chomsky and Herman's Nation article, as well as their subsequent work After the Cataclysm (1979), wrote that while Chomsky and Herman added disclaimers about knowing the truth of the matter, and about the nature of the regimes in Indochina, they nevertheless expressed a set of views by their comments and their use of various sources. For instance, Chomsky portrayed Porter and Hildebrand's book as "a carefully documented study of the destructive American impact on Cambodia and the success of the Cambodian revolutionaries in overcoming it, giving a very favorable picture of their programs and policies, based on a wide range of sources." Sharp, however, found that 33 out of 50 citations in one chapter of Porter and Hildebrand's book derived from the Khmer Rouge government and six from China, the Khmer Rouge's principal supporter.

Cambodia correspondent Nate Thayer said of Chomsky and Herman's Nation article that they "denied the credibility of information leaking out of Cambodia of a bloodbath underway and viciously attacked the authors of reportage suggesting many were suffering under the Khmer Rouge."

Journalist Andrew Anthony in the London Observer, said later that the Porter and Hildebrand's book "cravenly rehashed the Khmer Rouge's most outlandish lies to produce a picture of a kind of radical bucolic idyll." Chomsky, he said, questioned "refugee testimony," believing that "their stories were exaggerations or fabrications, designed for a western media involved in a 'vast and unprecedented propaganda campaign' against the Khmer Rouge government, 'including systematic distortion of the truth.'"

Donald W. Beachler cited reports that Chomsky's attempts to counter charges of Khmer Rouge atrocities also consisted of writing letters to editors and publications. Beachler said:

Examining materials in the Documentation Center of Cambodia archives, American commentator Peter Maguire found that Chomsky wrote to publishers such as Robert Silver [sic] of The New York Review of Books to urge discounting atrocity stories. Maguire reports that some of these letters were as long as twenty pages, and that they were even sharper in tone than Chomsky’s published words.

Journalist Fred Barnes also mentioned that Chomsky had written "a letter or two" to The New York Review of Books. Barnes discussed the Khmer Rouge with Chomsky and "the thrust of what he [Chomsky] said was that there was no evidence of mass murder" in Cambodia. Chomsky, according to Barnes, believed that "tales of holocaust in Cambodia were so much propaganda."

In 1978, French scholar Jean Lacouture, formerly a fervent sympathizer of the Khmer Rouge, said: "Cambodia and Cambodians are on their way to ethnic extinction.… If Noam Chomsky and his friends doubt it, they should study the papers, the cultures, the facts."

Journalist Christopher Hitchens defended Chomsky and Herman in 1985. They "were engaged in the admittedly touchy business of distinguishing evidence from interpretations." Chomsky and Herman have continued to argue that their analysis of the situation in Cambodia was reasonable, based on the information available to them at the time, and a legitimate critique of the disparities in reporting atrocities committed by Communist regimes relative to the atrocities committed by the U.S. and its allies. However, Bruce Sharp asserts that Chomsky continued into the 1990s to try to "demonstrate some sort of moral equivalence between the Khmer Rouge and the Americans" and to postulate significantly lower numbers of Khmer Rouge victims.

== Sweden ==
The Indochinese revolutionary movements enjoyed widespread support in Swedish society, particularly among supporters of the Swedish Social Democratic Party. When the Khmer Rouge captured Phnom Penh and expelled its inhabitants, 15,000 Swedes greeted their victory by spontaneously celebrating in the center of Stockholm. Claes-Göran Bjernér, a cameraman for the Swedish state broadcaster Sveriges Television, described the jubilant mood among Swedish journalists saying, "at the time most of us considered the Red Khmers as a liberation army and Pol Pot as no less than a Robin Hood". One journalist for Expressen cried with joy, calling the fall of Phnom Penh the most beautiful thing he had ever seen. Swedish author and journalist Per Olov Enquist defended the emptying of what he called "that whorehouse, Phnom Penh".

Prime Minister Olof Palme issued a joint declaration with Fidel Castro congratulating the Khmer Rouge on their victory, and immediately extended diplomatic recognition to the new rulers of Cambodia. Parliamentarian Birgitta Dahl became the driving force in the Social Democratic government for providing foreign aid to Democratic Kampuchea, an offer which the Khmer Rouge would eventually decline. In 1976, she vigorously denied allegations of Khmer Rouge atrocities during a discussion on Swedish radio.

We all know that much, well—probably most of what has been said and written about Cambodia is lies and speculation. It was absolutely necessary to evacuate Phnom Penh. It was a necessity to immediately get food production going and it would require enormous sacrifices of the population. But that is not our problem just now. The problem is that we don't actually have the knowledge—direct testimony—in order to dismiss all the lies that are spread by Cambodia's enemies.

Her skepticism was shared by Gertrud Sigurdsen, the Minister for International Development Cooperation, who dismissed the allegations as "exaggerated horror stories".

In recognition of the Swedish government's "special relationship" with the Khmer Rouge, Kaj Björk, the Swedish ambassador to Beijing, became the first diplomat of any western country to be invited to visit Democratic Kampuchea in 1976. A Social Democrat, Björk had been a fervent admirer of Maoist China, where he developed a friendship with Ieng Sary, the third-most senior official in the Khmer Rouge. Now serving as the Swedish government's official source of information about Cambodia, he wrote glowing diplomatic reports extolling the new regime. When a member of the Palestinian delegation observed that he had detected fear on the faces of Cambodians, Björk instead attributed their countenance to the natural modesty of the Cambodian people.

Also accompanying Björk on his strictly guided tour of the country was Jan Lundvik, an official from Sweden's Ministry for Foreign Affairs, who dismissed concurrent reportage in the French press alleging 800,000 deaths under the Khmer Rouge as unimaginable. They were lodged in one of Phnom Penh's abandoned mansions where Björk enjoyed the desolation of the empty city, remarking, "Being a privileged prisoner in Phnom Penh's deserted upper-class quarter is a great opportunity for quiet concentration. What could then be more appropriate than to immerse oneself in Friedrich Engel's Anti-Dühring?"

Their reluctance to say anything critical about Cambodia was also informed in part by electoral concerns—it was feared that scrutiny of the Swedish government's plans to offer foreign aid to the Khmer Rouge could hamper the Social Democrat's fortunes in the upcoming 1976 Swedish general election.

In 1977, a third Swedish diplomat would be invited to visit Cambodia. Jean-Christophe Öberg, a radical Social Democrat who had been stationed in Hanoi and Bangkok, made a two-day tour of the country and upon his return, conveyed his uncritical impressions to the media. Although he had made an effort to personally interview Cambodian refugees, Öberg dismissed their testimony as false because he felt their accounts were suspiciously consistent with what had been reported by John Barron and Anthony Paul in Reader's Digest.

Well, the refugee's stories are, in their very nature, highly coloured. Their accounts are made with their own interest before their eyes. Partly, they want to get out of the camps as soon as possible ... and to make it possible to obtain status as a political refugee, you have to prove you have been subject to persecution! ... What is so striking about this, is that when I went around and talked to people in the camp, they described the situation in Cambodia just as it had been reported in Reader's Digest. And this cannot be taken very seriously! It would have been more interesting to listen to what the Cambodians had to say about the situation in Cambodia, according to their own experiences, rather than what was said in [Reader's Digest] in February. And I would like to emphasize how exaggerated and biased the reports from Cambodia have been in the international news media. And that brings us back to what we said earlier. "Why is it like this? Who is behind it?" But apparently there are those who have an interest in continuing to portray the regime in Phnom Penh as a reign of murder. One can say that the best way to deny this is to let the journalists come there and see for themselves.

The uncritical accounts of Swedish diplomats would later be cited by other skeptics trying to present a more benign image of the Khmer Rouge.

=== Sweden–Kampuchea Friendship Association ===
In August 1978, four members of the Sweden–Kampuchea Friendship Association (SKFA) were invited to visit Cambodia. Among them were its chairperson Hedvig Ekerwald, Gunnar Bergström, the editor of the magazine Kampuchea, Jan Myrdal, the son of Gunnar and Alva Myrdal and one of Sweden's most internationally renowned left-wing activists, and Marita Wikander, who was married to a Khmer Rouge diplomat who had been stationed in East Germany before he was recalled to Cambodia. During their visit, they would have a lavish dinner with Pol Pot.

Wikander asked their hosts if she could see her husband, but her request was denied. Unbeknownst to her, her husband had been executed by the Khmer Rouge after his return to Cambodia in 1977, one year earlier. Her son would later find records of his death at Tuol Sleng.

At that time, aged 27, Bergström believed that the reports about overwork, starvation, and mass killings in Cambodia were just "Western propaganda." The four saw "smiling peasants" and a society on its way to become "an ideal society". When they came back to Sweden, they "undertook a speaking tour and wrote articles in support of the Democratic Kampuchea regime."

Evidence that emerged after the fall of the regime shocked Bergström, forcing him to change his views. He said that it was "like falling off the branch of the tree" and that he had to re-identify everything he had believed in. In later interviews, he acknowledged that he had been wrong, that it was a "propaganda tour" and that they were brought to see what the Khmer Rouge wanted them to see. Bergström would later return to Cambodia for a "big forgiveness tour." In a speech with high school students in Phnom Penh on 12 September 2016, he recommended that everybody should learn history.

Jan Myrdal never abandoned his support for the Khmer Rouge.

== Malcolm Caldwell ==
British Marxist academic Malcolm Caldwell, a professor at the School of Oriental and African Studies at the University of London and an associate of Noam Chomsky, wrote extensively about Cambodia, including an article in The Guardian called "The Cambodian defence" denying reports of Khmer Rouge genocide, and was regarded as one of "the staunchest defenders of the Pol Pot regime in the West."

For Caldwell, who wrote the essay "Cambodia: Rationale of a Rural Policy", the Communist regime in Cambodia represented the "promise of a better future for all." In his writings, Caldwell heavily cited information from Kampuchean Information Minister Hu Nim, perhaps not being aware that Hu Nim had been removed from the position, and ordered by Pol Pot to be tortured and executed at Tuol Sleng prison.

Caldwell concluded that, in time,

[T]he Kampuchean revolution will appear more and more clearly as one of the most significant early indications of the great and necessary change beginning to convulse the world in the later 20th century and shifting from a disaster-bound course to one holding out the promise of a better future for all.

Caldwell also wrote that, "The evacuation of Phnom Penh was not, therefore, an unpremeditated act of savagery (as portrayed in the Western press), but a well-thought-out operation to feed its starving people." Shortly before departing for Cambodia, Caldwell delivered a speech to the Institute of Race Relations where he promoted the Pol Pot regime, concluding that "the Kampuchean experiment, which may appear to the Western media and to the Vietnamese and Russians as totally irrational, reactionary and backward, is a very valid and valuable experiment." He argued that "it would be a great pity" and"‘a very great tragedy" if "the Kampuchean experiment were to be extinguished.

=== Death ===
Caldwell was a member of the first delegation of three Western writers—two Americans, Elizabeth Becker and Richard Dudman, and Caldwell—to be invited to visit Cambodia in December 1978, nearly 4 years after the Khmer Rouge had taken power. The invitation was apparently an effort by Pol Pot, leader of the Khmer Rouge, to improve the image of the Khmer Rouge in the West, now questioned by some of its former academic sympathizers.

On 22 December, Caldwell had a private meeting with Pol Pot and returned "euphoric" to the guest house in Phnom Penh where the three members of the delegation were staying. During the night, Becker awoke to the sound of gunfire and saw a Cambodian man with a gun in the guest house outside her room. Later that night, she and Dudman were allowed by guards to venture out of their rooms and they discovered Caldwell's body. He had been shot. The body of a Cambodian man was also in his room.

The murder of Caldwell has never been fully explained. Four of the Cambodian guards were arrested and two confessed under torture, saying

We were attacking to ruin the Khmer Rouge Party's policy, to prevent the Party from gathering friends in the world ... it would be enough to attack the English guest, because the English guest had written in support of our Party ... Therefore, we must absolutely succeed in attacking this English guest, in order that the American guests would write about it.

Whatever the motive behind Caldwell's murder, it seems highly unlikely that it could have occurred in tightly controlled Cambodia without the involvement of high-level Khmer Rouge officials. Becker later reflected that "Caldwell’s death was caused by the madness of the regime he openly admired."

The impact of Caldwell's visit to Cambodia and his murder was muted by the Vietnamese invasion of Cambodia three days later on 25 December 1978, which soon ended the rule of the Khmer Rouge. Support for the Khmer Rouge in the Western academic community of Cambodian scholars quietly faded away. Peter Rodman, an American foreign policy expert and public official, stated that "When Hanoi [Vietnam] turned publicly against Phnom Penh, it suddenly became respectable for many on the Left to 'discover' the murderous qualities of the Khmer Rouge – qualities that had been obvious to unbiased observers for years."

== Recanting ==
With the takeover of Cambodia by Vietnam in 1979 and the discovery of incontestable evidence of Khmer Rouge atrocities, including mass graves, the "tales told by refugees," which had been doubted by many Western academics, proved to be entirely accurate. Some former enthusiasts for the Khmer Rouge recanted their previous views, others diverted their interest to other issues, and a few continued to defend the Khmer Rouge.

In an exchange with William Shawcross in an issue of The New York Review of Books dated 20 July 1978, Gareth Porter wrote that

It is true, as Shawcross notes from my May 1977 Congressional testimony, that I have changed my view on a number of aspects of the Cambodian situation. I have no interest in defending everything the Khmer government does, and I believe that the policy of self-reliance has been carried so far that it has imposed unnecessary costs on the population of Cambodia. Shawcross, however, clearly does have an interest in rejecting our conclusions. It is time, I suggest, for him to examine it carefully, because it does not make for intellectual honesty.

Shawcross responded,

I was glad to acknowledge in my article that Mr. Porter had changed his views on the Khmer Rouge and it is a tribute to his own integrity that he now agrees that the Khmer Rouge have imposed 'unnecessary costs' on the Cambodian people. He should, however, be a little more careful before he accuses others of deliberately falsifying evidence and of intellectual dishonesty.

In 2010, Porter said he had been waiting many years for someone to ask him about his earlier views of the Khmer Rouge. He described how the climate of distrust of the government generated during the Vietnam War carried over to Cambodia. "I uncovered a series of instances when government officials were propagandizing [about the Vietnam War]. They were lying," he explained. "I've been well aware for many years that I was guilty of intellectual arrogance. I was right about the bloodbath in Vietnam, so I assumed I would be right about Cambodia."

Australian Ben Kiernan recanted after interviewing 500 Cambodian refugees in 1979. He admitted that he had been "late in recognizing the extent of the tragedy in Cambodia ... and wrong about ... the brutal authoritarian trend within the revolutionary movement after 1973."

In the opinion of Donald W. Beachler, the genocide deniers and doubters among academics may have been motivated more by politics than a search for the truth, but conservatives who "embraced the reports" of Khmer Rouge atrocities had no less "cynicism or naiveté" in later downplaying reports of atrocities by anti-communists in Central America. He noted that the supportive attitude towards the Khmer Rouge had also been expressed by the U.S. government and politicians for a dozen years after the overthrow of the regime in January 1979, as part of the denigration against the Vietnamese occupation of Cambodia in the 1980s. In fact, the U.S. was one of the countries that had voted for the retainment of the Democratic Kampuchea's seat at the United Nations until 1991. According to Singaporean diplomat Bilahari Kausikan, the U.S. used to threaten Singapore with "blood on the floor" to pressure the latter to support the genocidal regime at a UN international conference in 1981. Bruce Sharp, who points out many errors of Chomsky's analysis, also says that "While Chomsky's comments on Cambodia are misleading and inaccurate, one important point must be borne in mind: The actions of the United States were largely responsible for the growth of the Khmer Rouge."

In 2013, the Cambodian Prime Minister Hun Sen passed legislation which makes illegal the denial of the Cambodian genocide and other war crimes committed by the Khmer Rouge. The legislation was passed after comments by a member of the opposition, Kem Sokha, who is the deputy president of the Cambodian National Rescue Party. Sokha had stated that exhibits at Tuol Sleng were fabricated and that the artifacts had been faked by the Vietnamese following their invasion in 1979. Sokha's party have claimed that the comments have been taken out of context.

=== Continued downplaying ===
Certain authors have continued to downplay Khmer Rouge atrocities in recent years. Richard Dudman, who accompanied Caldwell to Cambodia, challenged the "conventional wisdom that Pol Pot and the Khmer Rouge are irrational fanatics who practiced deliberate genocide [and] slaughtered more than one million Cambodians" in a 1990 editorial in The New York Times, arguing that "The evidence for these fixed beliefs consists mainly of poignant though statistically inconclusive anecdotes from accounts of mass executions in a few villages. It comes mostly from those with an interest in blackening the name of the Khmer Rouge: From Cambodian refugees, largely the middle- and upper-class victims of the Pol Pot revolution, and from the Vietnamese."

In 2012, Holocaust denier Israel Shamir wrote an article titled "Pol Pot Revisited" for CounterPunch, in which he argued:

New Cambodia (or Kampuchea, as it was called) under Pol Pot and his comrades was a nightmare for the privileged, for the wealthy and for their retainers; but poor people had enough food and were taught to read and write. As for the mass killings, these are just horror stories, averred my Cambodian interlocutors. Surely the victorious peasants shot marauders and spies, but many more died of American-planted mines and during the subsequent Vietnamese takeover, they said ... Noam Chomsky assessed that the death toll in Cambodia may have been inflated 'by a factor of a thousand' ... To me, this recalls other CIA-sponsored stories of Red atrocities, be it Stalin's Terror or the Ukrainian Holodomor ... [The Vietnamese] supported the black legend of genocide to justify their own bloody intervention.

Whilst acknowledging that they committed mass murder and crimes against humanity, author Philip Short has argued that the Khmer Rouge were "innocent" of committing genocide, citing "Article II of the UN Genocide Convention", claiming that they "did not seek to exterminate a 'national, ethnic, racial or religious group', whether their own, the Vietnamese, the Chams or any other. They conspired to enslave a people." This interpretation was criticised by Ben Kiernan, who pointed out that Short had truncated the UN's "definition of genocide: acts committed “with the intent to destroy, in whole or in part, a national, ethnical, racial or religious group, as such.” Quoting selectively, he substituted “exterminate” for “in whole or in part.”" Kiernan also states that Short:

"overlooks the case that the Khmer Rouge committed genocide against substantial “parts” of Cambodia’s majority Khmer Buddhist community and of ethnic minorities such as the Vietnamese, Chinese, and Cham Muslims. He declines to inform readers of the UN Group of Experts’ 1999 recommendation that Khmer Rouge leaders face trial for genocide, having “subjected the people of Cambodia to almost all of the acts enumerated in the Convention.” Rather, Short compares Pol Pot’s violent “dispersal” of every one of Cambodia’s 113 Muslim communities to “school bussing in the United States to achieve desegregation. That, too, involved the dispersal of pupils of one race among those of another.”"

== Disputing the number of victims ==
Estimates of the number of Cambodians who died during the four years of Khmer Rouge rule have been controversial, and range from less than one million to more than three million. Ben Kiernan, head of the Cambodian Genocide Project at Yale University, estimated that the Khmer Rouge were responsible for 1.5 million deaths and later raised that estimate to 1.7 million, more than 20% of the population. His deputy, Craig Etcheson, undertook the most complete survey of mass graves and evidence of executions in Cambodia and concluded in 1999 that the Khmer Rouge may have executed as many as 1.5 million people and as many as another 1.5 million may have died of starvation and overwork. However, Kiernan subsequently criticized Etcheson for "sloppiness, exaggerating a horrific death toll," and "ethnic auctioneering." Etcheson's report was removed from the website of the Cambodian Genocide Project.

Kiernan had earlier been cited by Noam Chomsky and Edward S. Herman in 1979, saying that "[Kiernan] notes that most of the atrocity stories come from areas of little Khmer Rouge strength, where orders to stop reprisals were disobeyed by soldiers wreaking vengeance, often drawn from the poorest sections of the peasantry." Kiernan has since completely rejected his own previous explanation, saying in 1996 that: "Despite its underdeveloped economy, the regime probably exerted more power over its citizens than any state in world history. It controlled and directed their public lives more closely than government had ever done."

== See also ==
- Bibliography of the Cambodian genocide
- Outline of the Cambodian genocide
- Allegations of United States support for the Khmer Rouge
- Cambodian genocide
- Khmer Rouge
- Democratic Kampuchea
