= When the War Was Over =

1986 book by Elizabeth Becker

When the War Was Over: Cambodia and the Khmer Rouge Revolution
- Author: Elizabeth Becker
- Publisher: Simon & Schuster
- Publication date: 1986
- ISBN: 0-671-41787-8
- OCLC: 13334079

When the War Was Over: Cambodia and the Khmer Rouge Revolution is a 1986 non-fiction book by American journalist Elizabeth Becker. The book recounts Becker's 1978 reporting trip to Democratic Kampuchea, accompanied by journalist Richard Dudman and academic Malcolm Caldwell, upon the invitation of senior Khmer Rouge officials. Becker was one of the few foreigners to travel to the country during the regime, and included her interviewing Pol Pot. It was loosely adapted into the 2024 Rithy Panh film Meeting with Pol Pot.
