= Malcolm Caldwell =

Scottish Marxist academic (1931–1978)

- Born: James Alexander Malcolm Caldwell; 27 September 1931; Stirling, Scotland
- Died: 23 December 1978 (aged 47); Phnom Penh, Democratic Kampuchea
- Cause of death: Murder by shooting
- Occupations: Writer, activist
- Political party: Labour

James Alexander Malcolm Caldwell (27 September 1931 – 23 December 1978) was a Scottish academic and a prolific Marxist writer. He was a consistent critic of American foreign policy and supported communist and socialist movements in Asia, most notably supporting the Khmer Rouge. Caldwell was murdered a few hours after meeting Pol Pot in Cambodia. His murder is generally attributed to the Khmer Rouge regime, though the exact chain of command remains unclear.

== Early life and career ==
Malcolm Caldwell was born in Stirling, Scotland, the son of a miner who later became an architect. He was educated at Kirkcudbright Academy, where he was Dux in 1949. He obtained degrees from the University of Nottingham and the University of Edinburgh. He completed two years' national service in the British Army, becoming a sergeant in the Army Educational Corps. In 1959, after being demobilized, he joined the School of Oriental and African Studies at the University of London as a Research Fellow. Although he was met with conservative opposition within the school, he remained on its faculty throughout his life. As well as being an academic, he was an energetic and committed radical political activist. He chaired the British Campaign for Nuclear Disarmament from 1968 to 1970. He was dedicated to criticising Western foreign policy and capitalist economics, paying particular attention to American policy. He was a founding editor of the Journal of Contemporary Asia, a journal concerned with revolutionary movements in Asia. In 1978, Caldwell was one of the Labour Party candidates in St Mary's ward in the local elections for the Bexley London Borough Council.

== Murder in Cambodia ==
Caldwell was one of the staunchest defenders of the Pol Pot regime. He frequently downplayed reports of mass executions by the Khmer Rouge in Cambodia, and was widely criticised by numerous authorities for doing so.

In December 1978, Caldwell was a member, along with Elizabeth Becker and Richard Dudman, of one of the few groups of Western journalists and writers invited to visit Cambodia since the Khmer Rouge had taken power in April 1975. The three visitors were given a highly structured tour of the country. "We traveled in a bubble", wrote Becker. "No one was allowed to speak to me freely." On 22 December, Caldwell had a private audience with Pol Pot, the leader of Cambodia. After the meeting, he came back to the guesthouse in Phnom Penh where the three were staying in a mood described by Becker as "euphoric". At about 11:00 p.m. that night, Becker was awakened by the sound of gunfire. She stepped out of her bedroom and saw a heavily armed Cambodian man who pointed a pistol at her. She ran back into her room and heard people moving and more gunshots. An hour later a Cambodian came to her bedroom door and told her that Caldwell was dead. She and Dudman went to his room. He had been shot in the chest, and the body of a Cambodian man was also in the room, possibly the same man who had pointed the pistol at Becker.

The motives for Caldwell's murder remain unexplained. Andrew Anthony, writing in The Observer, notes: "Certainly there must have been some kind of in-house involvement, as the guests were guarded. But who instructed the guards, and why they did so, remains a subject of speculation." Journalist Wilfred Burchett and members of Caldwell's family believe that Caldwell was killed on the orders of Pol Pot, possibly following a disagreement between the two during their meeting. This belief was also shared by Australian historian and friend of Caldwell Keith Windschuttle, who claimed that Caldwell had been shot by "two of Pol Pot's henchmen". British intelligence services also concluded that "Pol had ordered Caldwell's death."

The Khmer Rouge conducted an internal inquiry, which found that one of the guards present "had been having an unhappy love affair", and had gone on a shooting spree before killing himself. Four of the guards at the guest house were arrested and two of them confessed under torture at the Khmer Rouge's S-21 prison that the killers were subversives attempting to undermine the Khmer Rouge regime and that Caldwell was killed "to prevent the Party from gathering friends in the world". One of them also implicated Deputy Prime Minister and Minister of National Defence Son Sen. Pol himself stated he believed Dudman to have been the killer, accusing him of being a CIA agent sent to discredit the regime. Pol's former aide and "Head of Security at the Foreign Ministry", Phi Phuon, who witnessed the aftermath of the incident, thought that the purported killer "had been murdered and someone had tried to mask his death as a suicide".

Caldwell's brother, David, believed that his brother "had 'discovered the truth about the Pol Pot regime' but 'dared not admit this to either Becker or Dudman'". However, journalist Andrew Anthony wrote that this "seems unlikely", citing historian David P. Chandler, who met the translator present at Pol and Caldwell's meeting, "who remembered a very pleasant exchange conducted in a spirit of enthusiastic agreement".

In his biography of Pol Pot, author Philip Short claimed that the "likeliest explanation, which, perversely, the regime refused to credit because of its obsession with traitors, was that the attack was the work of a Vietnamese commando unit. No one else had a comparable interest in showing up Khmer Rouge incompetence and no one else was as well-placed to do so."

Three days after Caldwell was killed, the Vietnamese invaded Cambodia and soon put an end to the Khmer Rouge government. Becker cautioned against applying "rational thinking to the situation", stating that Caldwell's "murder was no less rational than the tens of thousands of other murders", and that in the end his "death was caused by the madness of the regime he openly admired".

== Works ==
- Hunger and the Bomb (pamphlet). CND. c. 1967.
- The Modern World: Indonesia. Oxford University Press. 1968.
- (with James Lewis Henderson) (1968). The Chainless Mind: A Study of Resistance and Liberation (Twentieth Century Themes). Hamish Hamilton.
- Socialism and the environment: essays. Nottingham: Spokesman Books. 1972.
- The Energy of Imperialism and the Imperialism of Energy (booklet). 1972.
- (with Lek Tan) (1973). Cambodia in the Southeast Asian War. Monthly Review Press.
- Ten years' military terror in Indonesia. Nottingham: Spokesman Books. 1976.
- (with Umberto Melotti) (1977). Marx and the Third World. Macmillan.
- The Wealth of Some Nations: Introduction to the Study of Political Economy. London: Zed Books. 1977.
- (with David Elliott) (1978). Thailand: Origins of Military Rule. London: Zed Books.
- (with others) (1978). Thailand: Roots of Conflict. Nottingham: Spokesman Books.
- (with N. Jeffrey) (1978). Planning and Urbanism in China (Progress in Planning). Elsevier.
- (with Mohamed Amin) (1978). Malaya: The Making of a Neo-colony. Nottingham: Spokesman Books.
- (1979) Lee Kuan Yew: The Man, His Mayoralty and His Mafia.
- (with Ernst Utrecht) (1979). Indonesia: An Alternative History. Sydney: Alternative Publishing Co-operative Ltd.

== See also ==
- List of unsolved murders (1900–1979)
- Cambodian genocide denial
- Vann Nath
- Chum Mey
- Sean Flynn
- Dana Stone
- Stuart Robert Glass
- François Bizot
- François Ponchaud
- Meeting with Pol Pot (2024 film)

Preceded by Sheila Oakes	Chair of CND; 1968–1970	Succeeded by April Carter
