= Sweden–Kampuchea Friendship Association =

Swedish organization on the Vietnam War

- Abbreviation: SKFA
- Formation: October 1976
- Founded at: Sweden
- Dissolved: December 1980
- Leader: Gunnar Bergström

The Sweden–Kampuchea Friendship Association was a Swedish Maoist pro–Khmer Rouge Kampuchea friendship organization.

The five people of the organization (including Jan Myrdal) made a trip to Democratic Kampuchea in 1978 in which they met with Pol Pot.

== History ==
The Sweden–Kampuchea Friendship Association was founded in 1976 as part of associations against the Vietnam War. It was influenced by the Maoist Communist Workers' Party of Sweden and other pro–Khmer Rouge organizations in Denmark and Norway.

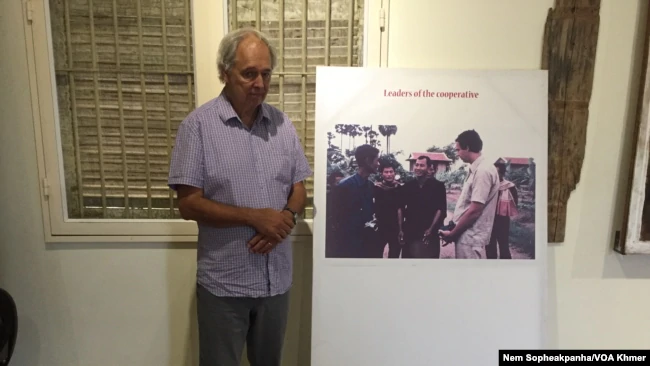
Gunnar Bergström pictured with a photograph of his meeting with Khmer Rouge

=== Visit to Kampuchea ===
In August 1978, members of the organization visited Democratic Kampuchea for 14 days. They met with Pol Pot and Ieng Sary. Among them were the chairperson Hedvig Ekerwald, Gunnar Bergström, the editor of the magazine Kampuchea, Jan Myrdal, the son of Gunnar and Alva Myrdal, and Marita Wikander, who was married to a Khmer Rouge diplomat who had been stationed in East Germany before he was recalled to Cambodia. During their visit, they would have a lavish dinner with Pol Pot.

Wikander asked their hosts if she could see her husband, but her request was denied. Unbeknownst to her, her husband had been executed by the Khmer Rouge after his return to Cambodia in 1977, one year earlier. Her son would later find records of his death at Tuol Sleng.

At that time, aged 27, Bergström believed that the reports about overwork, starvation, and mass killings in Cambodia were just "Western propaganda." The four saw "smiling peasants" and a society on its way to become "an ideal society". When they came back to Sweden, they "undertook a speaking tour and wrote articles in support of the Democratic Kampuchea regime."

Evidence that emerged after the fall of the regime shocked Bergström, forcing him to change his views. He said that it was "like falling off the branch of the tree" and that he had to re-identify everything he had believed in. In later interviews, he acknowledged that he had been wrong, that it was a "propaganda tour" and that they were brought to see what the Khmer Rouge wanted them to see. Bergström would later return to Cambodia for a "big forgiveness tour." In a speech with high school students in Phnom Penh on 12 September 2016, he recommended that everybody should learn history.

Jan Myrdal never abandoned his support for the Khmer Rouge.

== See also ==
- Cambodian genocide denial
- Japan-Cambodia Friendship Association - A friendship organization that existed in Japan and supported the Khmer Rouge.
