= François Bizot =

French anthropologist

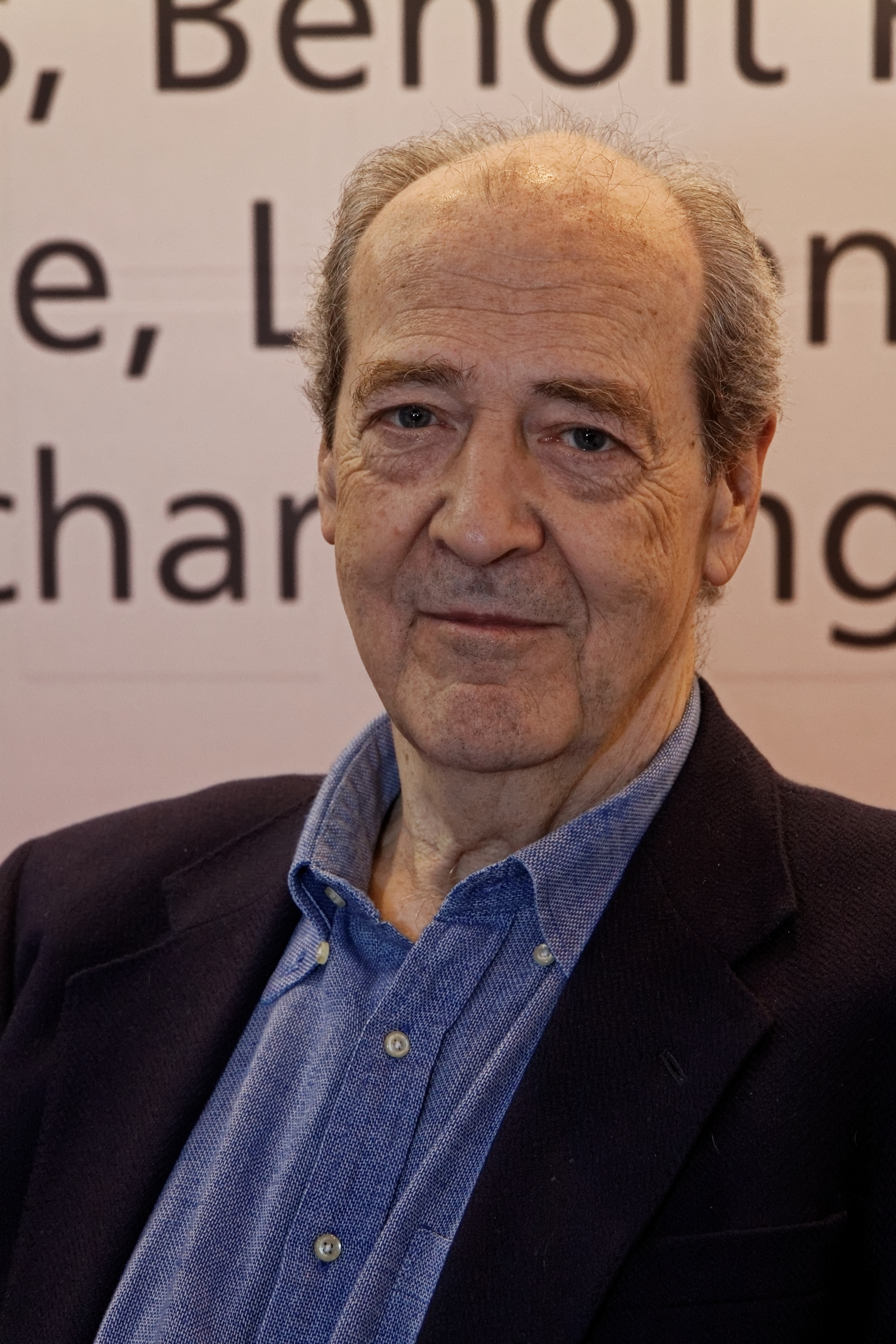
- François Bizot at the Salon du livre, in Paris (2012)
- Born: 8 February 1940 (age 86); Nancy, France
- Occupation: anthropologist

François Bizot (French pronunciation: [fʁɑ̃swa bizo]; born 8 February 1940) is a French anthropologist. While working as a conservationist in Cambodia, he was held captive by the Khmer Rouge for several months. He was released after being found innocent of spying charges, becoming the only Westerner to survive imprisonment by the Khmer Rouge.

== Arrival in Cambodia ==
Bizot arrived in Cambodia in 1965 to study Buddhism practised in the countryside. He travelled extensively around Cambodia, researching the history and customs of its dominant religion. He speaks fluent Khmer, French and English and was married to a Cambodian with whom he had a daughter, Hélène, in 1968. When the Vietnam War spilled into Cambodia, Bizot was employed at the Angkor Conservation Office, restoring ceramics and bronzes.

Bizot, at first, welcomed the American intervention in Cambodia, hoping that they might counter the rising influence of the Communists. "But their irresponsibility, the inexcusable naivete, even their cynicism, frequently aroused more fury and outrage in me than did the lies of the Communists. Throughout those years of war, as I frantically scoured the hinterland for the old manuscripts that the heads of monasteries had secreted in lacquered chests, I witnessed the Americans' imperviousness to the realities of Cambodia," wrote Bizot in his memoirs of the time.

== Capture ==
In October 1971, Bizot and his two Cambodian colleagues were captured by the Khmer Rouge. During his captivity on charges of being a CIA agent at the Khmer Rouge Camp M.13 at Kampong Chhnang, he had was interrogated by Comrade Duch, who later became the Director of the Tuol Sleng concentration camp in Phnom Penh. Their exchanges evolved into long conversations, and a somewhat friendly relationship. During his three-month imprisonment he became aware of the genocidal nature of the Khmer Rouge long before other outsiders. Because Bizot confronted him about the absurdities of the Khmer Rouge's policies, Duch reached the conclusion that he was not a spy, in which case he would not have been so forward. Bizot was released in December 1971, after Duch wrote a detailed report that convinced the Khmer Rouge leadership of Bizot's innocence. Bizot's Cambodian colleagues were executed.

== Life after captivity ==
When the Khmer Rouge captured Phnom Penh on 17 April 1975, Bizot, like most other foreigners in the country, sought refuge in the French Embassy. Because of his fluency in Khmer, he soon became the primary point of contact and unofficial translator between the embassy officials and the Khmer Rouge. He left Cambodia when the Khmer Rouge expelled all foreigners and sealed off Cambodia's borders. He returned to Cambodia in 2003 and met his former captor Duch, who was waiting for his trial for crimes against humanity, for about one hour and a half (a few minutes of the encounter were put on film). These moments can be seen in the documentary "Derrière Le Portail" ("Behind The Gate"). Duch was on trial at the Extraordinary Chambers in the Courts of Cambodia and received a 35-year sentence, later increased to life from an appeal. Bizot was the first witness to testify at the trial.

Bizot is Emeritus Professor at the École française d'Extrême-Orient.

== In popular culture ==
Bizot's story provides the basis for the character Hansen in John le Carré's novel The Secret Pilgrim.

== Personal life ==
While in Cambodia, lived with a Cambodian woman, Chhoeung, with whom he had a daughter, Hélène, born in a village near Siem Reap. One year before the Khmer Rouge takeover Hélène could be sent to France, but Chhoeung remained trapped in Cambodia; she was eventually located in Thailand in 1979 and brought to France after Bizot paid men to retrieve her. In the mid-1980s, Bizot married with a Frenchwoman, Catherine, with whom he had two children. Hélène later became a jewel designer in France. Bizot's grandson, Jean Depardieu, is Hélène's son with actor Gérard Depardieu.

== Works ==
- "The Unlimited Ornamental Ensembles of Angkor", Arts asiatiques, Notebooks published by the École française d'Extrême-Orient with the assistance of the CNRS, Vol. XXI, Paris 1970.
- "The Depiction of the Feet of the Buddha in Cambodia", Études asiatiques, XXV, Bern 1971.
- History of the Reamker, Story collected and presented by F. Bizot, École française d'Extrême-Orient, Phnom Penh 1973 [Other editions: Bangkok 1980, 1983; Phnom Penh 1991, 1993]. (in Khmer, introduction in French)
- The Five-Branched Fig Tree, Research on Khmer Buddhism, I, Publication of the École française d’Extrême-Orient, CVII, Paris 1976.
- "The Cave of Birth", Research on Khmer Buddhism, II, Bulletin of the École française d’Extrême-Orient, Vol. LXVII, Paris 1980.
- The Gift of Oneself, Research on Khmer Buddhism, III, Publication of the École française d’Extrême-Orient, Vol. CXXX, Paris 1981.
- "Notes on Buddhist Yantra of Indochina", in Tantric and Taoist Studies, in Honour of R. A. Stein, Mélanges chinois et bouddhiques, Vol. XX, edited by Michel Strickmann, Vol. I, Brussels 1981.
- "The Reamker", in Asian Variations in Rāmayāna, edited with an Introduction by K. R. Srinivasa Iyengar, Sahitya Akademi, New Delhi 1983. (in English)
- "An Unexpected Representation of the Five-Branched Fig Tree", Le Cambodge, Vol. II, ASEMI, XV, 1-4, Paris 1984.
- "The Buddha of Vat Phra Yun", Religion and Beliefs, International Conference on Thai Studies, August 22-24, IV, Bangkok 1984. (in English)
- "Saffron Yellow, the Colour of Monks", Géo, Thailand, Religion, no. 78, August 1985.
- "Initiatory Creation in Buddhism in Southeast Asia", in Myths and Beliefs of the Whole World, IV, Asian Worlds, under the direction of André Akoun, Paris 1985.
- "Bhikkhu, Tāpas, Ācārya and Brahmins in Communities in Cambodia and Thailand", Zeitschrift des Deutschen Morgenländischen Gesellschaft, Supplement VI, XXII. Deutscher Orientalistentag, March 21-25, Tübingen, Stuttgart 1985.
- The Traditions of Pabbajjā in Southeast Asia, Research on Khmer Buddhism, IV, with a preface by Heinz Bechert, Abhandlungen der Akademie der Wissenschaften in Göttingen, Philologisch-Historische Klasse, Series 3, No. 169, Göttingen 1988.
- "Theravāda: The Southeast Asian Tradition", in Encyclopédie philosophique universelle, Vol. I, L'Univers philosophique, edited by André Jacob, Presses Universitaires de France, Paris 1989, 1998, 2000.
- Rāmaker, or the Symbolic Love of Rām and Setā, Research on Khmer Buddhism, V, Publication of the École française d’Extrême-Orient, CLV, Paris 1989.
- "The Origins of Theravāda in the Peninsula", in Thailand from the Beginnings of its History to the 15th Century, First Franco-Thai Symposium, July 18–24, 1988, Conference Proceedings, Bangkok 1990.
- "Preface" in Catherine Becchetti, The Mystery in the Letters, Édition des Cahiers de France, Bangkok 1991.
- The Path of Lankā, "Buddhist Texts of Cambodia", Publication of the Manuscripts Publishing Fund, no. 1, École française d’Extrême-Orient, Paris-Chiang Mai-Phnom Penh 1992.
- "The Dhammakāya, the Body of the Buddha", in Buddhist Texts of Cambodia, no. 1, École française d’Extrême-Orient, 1992.
- Ratanamālā, The Garland of Jewels (with Oskar von Hinüber), "Buddhist Texts of Cambodia", no. 2, École française d’Extrême-Orient, Paris-Chiang Mai-Phnom Penh 1993.
- "Presentation", in New Research on Cambodia, edited by F. Bizot, Thematic Studies, no. 1, École française d’Extrême-Orient, Paris 1994.
- The Buddhism of the Thais, Brief history of its movements and ideas from the origins to the present day, Édition des Cahiers de France (FEM), Bangkok 1994.
- "The Consecration of Statues and the Cult of the Dead", in F. Bizot (ed.), New Research on Cambodia, École française d’Extrême-Orient, Paris 1994.
- "André Bareau, 1921–1993" (Obituary), in Bulletin de l'École française d’Extrême-Orient, Vol. 83, Paris 1994.
- "The Origins of Khmer Buddhism", in Proceedings of the Colloquium on the Khmer Country, Claude Jacques (ed.), École pratique des Hautes Études, Paris 1995.
- "Buddhist Measures According to the Vinaya and from the Pāli Commentaries of Ceylon and Southeast Asia", in Weights and Measures in Southeast Asia, Metrological Systems and Society, IRSEA-CNRS, Paris 1994, CNRS, Paris 1995.
- Ethnology of Southeast Asian and Oceanian Societies, Lecture reports of François Bizot, Director of Studies, Annuaire de l’École pratique des hautes études, Section of Religious Sciences, Vol. 104 (1995–1996), pp. 43–50.
- Purity through Words (Saddavimālā) (with François Lagirarde), "Buddhist Texts of Laos", no. 3, École française d’Extrême-Orient, Paris-Chiang Mai-Phnom Penh 1996.
- Pāli Veyyākarana, 1. Akkharavidhi, by Mahā Sila Viravongs, Presentation, composition, re-edition by F. Bizot, Publications of the Manuscripts Publishing Fund, Vientiane 1996. (in Lao)
- Buddhism of Southeast Asia, Lecture reports of François Bizot, Director of Studies, Annuaire de l’École pratique des hautes études, Section of Religious Sciences, Vol. 105 (1996–1997), pp. 75–86.
- Buddhism of Southeast Asia, Lecture reports of François Bizot, Director of Studies, Annuaire de l’École pratique des hautes études, Section of Religious Sciences, Vol. 106 (1997–1998), pp. 61–75.
- "An Encoded Writing of the Buddha's Names" (with Catherine Becchetti), in The Writing of the Proper Name, Proceedings published by the Centre d'Étude de l'Écriture, CNRS, L'Harmattan 1998.
- "Postface", in Georges Condominas, Buddhism in the Village, Éditions des Cahiers de France (FEM), Vientiane 1998.
- "Buddhism. Southeast Asia", in Critical Dictionary of Esotericism, edited by Jean Servier, Presses Universitaires de France, 1998.
- Buddhism of Southeast Asia, Lecture reports of François Bizot, Director of Studies, Annuaire de l’École pratique des hautes études, Section of Religious Sciences, Vol. 107 (1998–1999), pp. 109–115.
- "Heritage Conservation", in F. Bizot (ed.), Laos, Restore and Preserve the National Heritage, EFEO Colloquium (Catherine Becchetti), Édition des Cahiers de France (FEM), Vientiane 1999.
- "Buddhist Writings of Southeast Asia" (with Catherine Becchetti), in History of Writing, From Ideogram to Multimedia, edited by Anne-Marie Christin, Flammarion, Paris 2001, 2012.
- "Paul Lévy, 1909–1998" (Obituary), in Annuaire de l'École pratique des Hautes Études, 5th Section, no. 108, Paris 1999.
- For a Policy of the Human and Social Sciences, A. Supiot (ed.), Collections and Works 1998–2000 (collective), Presses Universitaires de France, Paris 2001.
- "The Place of the Northern Laos Communities in the History of Southeast Asian Buddhism", in Bulletin de l'École française d’Extrême-Orient, Vol. 87, Paris 2000.
- "Jean Boulbet, 1926–2007" (Obituary), in Bulletin de l'École française d’Extrême-Orient, Vol. 93, Paris 2006.
- "The Lost Horoscope of Cambodian Diviners", in Les astres et le destin, Astrology and Divination in East Asia, Extrême-Orient Extrême-Occident, 35, 2013.
- "The Speciation of the Three Robes and the DNA of the Buddha, Research on Khmer Buddhism, VI", in Regards sur la mer intérieure: Mélanges à la Mémoire d’Hubert Durt, I, Southeast Asia, edited by Bernard Faure and Iyanaga Nobumi, Mélanges chinois et bouddhiques, Vol. XXXVI, Peeters, Leuven–Paris–Bristol 2025, pp. 203–269.
- The Buddhism of the Crystal Globe. From Angkor Prenuptial Rites to the Genealogy of the Five Buddhas, Ontology and History, Research on Khmer Buddhism, VII (in preparation).

=== Narratives & Novels ===
- The Gate (narrative), Preface by John Le Carré, Éditions de La Table Ronde 2000, Éditions Folio 2002.
- "Preface" in David Chandler, S-21 or the Unpunished Crime of the Khmer Rouge, Éd. Autrement, Paris 2002.
- "Preface" in The Gate, Birth of an Executioner (Illustrated version of The Gate), drawings by Guy Forgeois, Éd. Talents Hauts, Paris 2006.
- The Leap of the Monitor Lizard (novel), Éd. Flammarion 2006, Éd. Folio 2008.
- The Executioner's Silence (narrative), Éd. Flammarion 2011, Éd. Folio 2013.

== See also ==
- Malcolm Caldwell
- Vann Nath
- Chum Mey
- Sean Flynn
- Dana Stone
- Stuart Robert Glass
- François Ponchaud
