= Japan-Cambodia Friendship Association =

Japanese organization that supported Democratic Kampuchea

- 日本カンボジア友好協会
- Formation: November 9, 1973
- Founded at: Japan
- Dissolved: August 6, 2018
- Chairman: Tetsuo Kitamura

The Japan-Cambodia Friendship Association (日本カンボジア友好協会, Nihon Kanbojia Yūkō Kyōkai) was a Japanese friendship association established in 1973 to promote relations between Japan and Cambodia. Founded through an agreement between Cambodian head of state Norodom Sihanouk and Kōzō Sasaki, then chairman of the Japan Socialist Party, the association subsequently developed close relations with Democratic Kampuchea after the Khmer Rouge came to power in 1975. It supported the Democratic Kampuchean government and later the Coalition Government of Democratic Kampuchea after the Vietnamese invasion of Cambodia in 1978.

The association organized exchanges and visits between Japanese and Cambodian political figures and was involved in efforts to promote Democratic Kampuchea's position in Japan. During the 1970s and 1980s, some of its members and associated Japanese volunteers also provided practical assistance to Cambodian forces aligned with the Khmer Rouge. The association remained active in Japan's political and public debate over Cambodia until its dissolution in 2018.

== History ==
The association was established in 1973 on the basis of an agreement between Norodom Sihanouk, then head of state of Cambodia, and Kōzō Sasaki, chairman of the Japan Socialist Party. At the time of its founding, Cambodia was under the control of the coup regime of Lon Nol (Khmer Republic), while Sihanouk had organized the government-in-exile Royal Government of National Union of Kampuchea in the People's Republic of China and was leading the anti-Lon Nol movement.

After the fall of Phnom Penh in 1975, the Khmer Rouge, allied with Sihanouk, took control of Cambodia and established the Democratic Kampuchea regime. The association thereafter functioned as a friendship organization of that regime.

== Activities ==
=== Under the Pol Pot regime ===
In June 1978, the association supported the visit to Japan of Ieng Sary, then Deputy Prime Minister of the Khmer Rouge government, and organized a welcome rally. In the same year, it organized a Democratic Kampuchea study mission led by Kōzō Sasaki—the first such visit by a Western group to Cambodia under Khmer Rouge rule.

=== After the fall of the Pol Pot regime ===
Following the collapse of the Pol Pot regime in January 1979 and the establishment of the Heng Samrin government (People's Republic of Kampuchea), the association continued to support the Coalition Government of Democratic Kampuchea (the three-faction alliance of the Pol Pot faction/Khmer Rouge, the Sihanouk faction/FUNCINPEC, and the Son Sann faction/Khmer People's National Liberation Front). It played a role in Khmer Rouge propaganda activities within Japan. For example, in May 1979 it supervised the Japanese translation of the “Black Paper” issued by the Ministry of Foreign Affairs of Democratic Kampuchea (which denounced the Vietnamese “invasion” and asserted the legitimacy of its own regime) and supported its publication in Japan.

Similar support activities continued into the 1990s. In 1992, association chairman Akio Shintani publicly described the People's Republic of Kampuchea as a “puppet regime resulting from Vietnamese aggression” and denied the Cambodian genocide as “Vietnamese propaganda” in the magazine Gekkan Masukomi Shimin. In 1993, Yasuyo Kawata visited Phnom Malai with the association’s support and held talks with Ieng Sary, Ieng Thirith, and others. These activities were criticized by Katsuichi Honda as amounting to denial of the Cambodian genocide.

=== Activities in Cambodia ===
The association’s “support” activities were not limited to rear-area work in Japan; they also extended to the construction of propaganda broadcasting networks in the field. In August 1983, Japanese volunteers dispatched at the request of the association built Democratic Kampuchea’s first amateur radio station, XU1SS, at Ampil along the Thai border. Similar Japanese volunteers later built the station XU1DK at the Pol Pot faction base of Phnom Malai in November 1990 and a propaganda broadcasting station in Pailin (the base of Ieng Sary and others) in 1996.

=== Later years ===
Due to the successive deaths of core members including Naoki Mabuchi, Akio Shintani, and Nagao Kato, the association was dissolved in 2018. At the time of dissolution its chairman was former Diet member Tetsuo Kitamura.

== See also ==
- Cambodia Relief Center – a contemporary Japanese relief organization that supported the Pol Pot faction
- Sweden–Kampuchea Friendship Association – a Swedish friendship association that supported the Pol Pot faction
