= Sophal Ear =

Cambodian-American political scientist

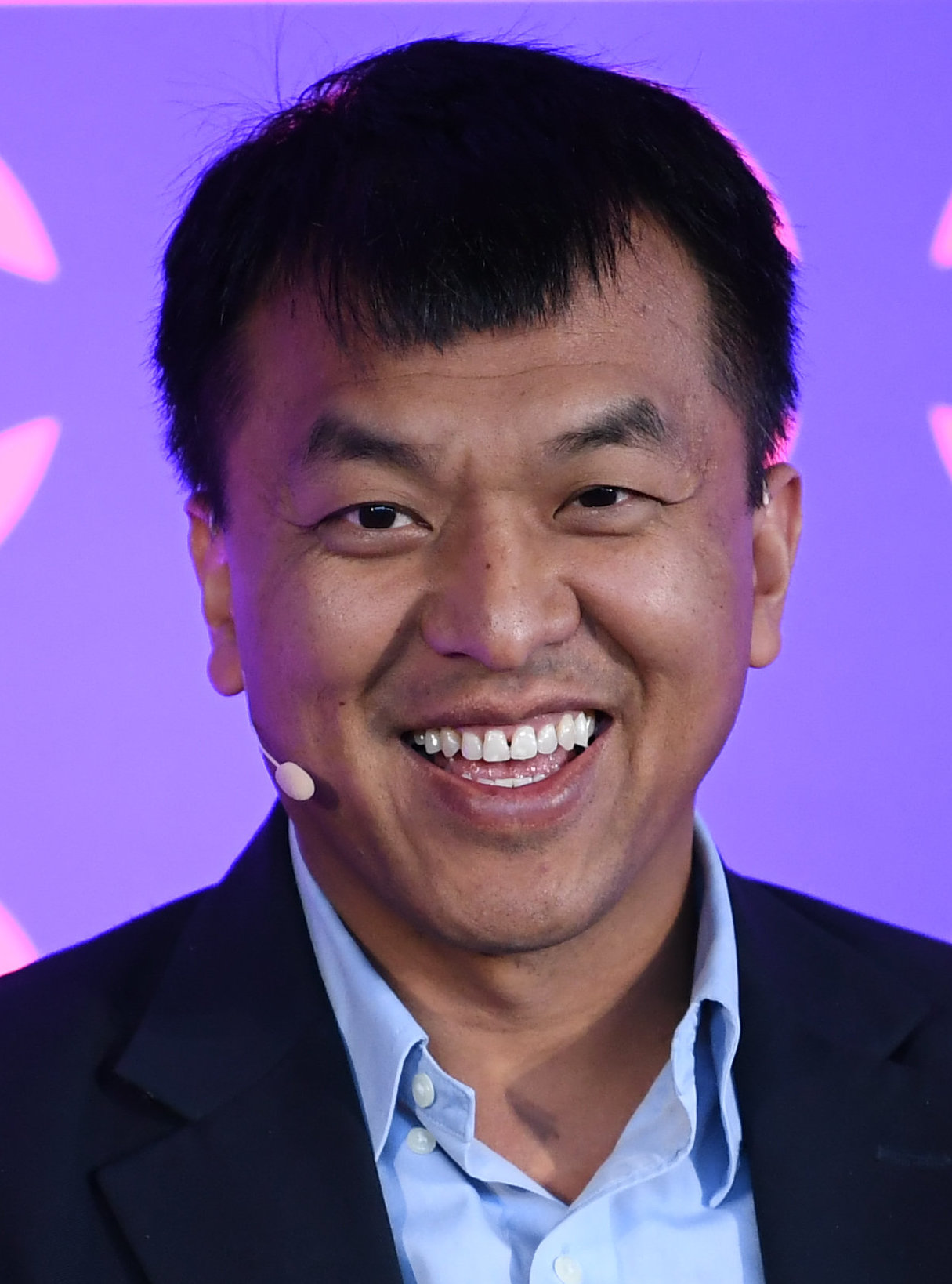
- Education: University of California, Berkeley; Princeton University
- Occupations: Professor, political scientist, author
- Organization(s): United Nations, World Bank, Occidental College, TED, World Economic Forum
- Website: sophalear.com

Sophal Ear is a Cambodian-American political scientist and expert in political economy, diplomacy, world affairs, and international development. A refugee from Cambodia, he studied at Princeton University and at the University of California, Berkeley. He has published extensively on Cambodian genocide and international aid and gives regular talks on these subjects.

Ear is a critic of the impact of foreign aid on Cambodia, writing that Cambodia today “is a kleptocracy cum thugocracy” and that “the international community, led by the UN, is its enabler.” He has written extensively and been critical of scholars, such as Noam Chomsky, accusing them of minimizing or denying the genocide occurring during the rule of the Khmer Rouge.

== Early life and education ==
Ear's father, Ear Muy Cuong, was a pharmacist in Phnom Penh. In 1975, the family was evacuated from Phnom Penh to Pursat Province, where they lived in a labor camp and worked the fields. It was there that Ear's father “died of dysentery and malnutrition after a brief stay at a mite-infested Khmer Rouge 'hospital.'” In 1976, when Ear's mother, Cam Youk Lim, heard that Vietnamese citizens in Cambodia were being allowed to return to Vietnam, she pretended to be Vietnamese and was able to escape Pol Pot's Cambodia with Ear and his four older siblings when Ear was ten years old. They went first to Hong Ngu, Vietnam; Ear's mother took the family to France and then to the U.S. His mother later worked as a seamstress at Elegance Embroidery in Oakland, California.

Ear attended the University of California, Berkeley where he received a B.A. He received an M.P.A. in Economics and Public Policy from the Woodrow Wilson School of Public and International Affairs at Princeton University in June 1997. He earned an M.S. in Agricultural and Resource Economics from the College of Natural Resources at the University of California, Berkeley, in December 2001. He earned an M.A. in political science at Berkeley in May 2002.

He earned a Ph.D. in political science at Berkeley in May 2006. His dissertation was entitled The Political Economy of Aid, Governance, and Policy-Making: Cambodia in Global, National, and Sectoral Perspectives. His dissertation committee consisted of David Leonard (chair), Bruce Cain, James Gregor, and Teh-Wei Hu (School of Public Health). His fields of specialization were Comparative Politics; Methodology; and East Asia/Southeast Asia.

He taught on the hospital ship USNS Mercy in support of the Pacific Partnership 2008. He completed his postdoc at the Maxwell School at Syracuse University, where he taught Policy and Administration in Developing Countries.

== Career ==
He served as a Consultant for WebXpose, in San Francisco from 1995 to 1996, and was a Country Analyst Intern (India and Thailand) for the Sovereign Risk Research Group at J.P. Morgan in New York in 1997. Next he served as a Consultant for the Human Development Social Protection Team and for Middle East and North Africa Human Development at the World Bank in Washington, DC, from 1997 to 2000. Ear served as Assistant Resident Representative in the Democratic Governance Unit and Capacity Development & Special Initiatives Unit of the United Nations Development Programme in Timor-Leste from 2002 to 2003. During these years, his work took him to the West Bank, Gaza, and Algeria on social projects, where he observed the consequences of foreign aid.

Ear worked as a Post-Doctoral Fellow in the Department of Public Administration at the Maxwell School of Citizenship and Public Affairs at Syracuse University, from August 2006 to May 2007, before becoming assistant professor in the Department of National Security Affairs at the US Naval Postgraduate School in Monterey, California, from June 2007 to August 2014. Ear was Fulbright Senior Specialist at the Institute of Security and International Studies at Chulalongkorn University in Bangkok, Thailand, in December 2010. He has since been a tenured associate professor in the Department of Diplomacy and World Affairs at Occidental College in Los Angeles, California, from August 2014 on.

He is a TED Fellow, Fulbright Specialist, Delphi Fellow of BigThink, Term Member of the Council on Foreign Relations, Young Global Leader of the World Economic Forum, a Fellow of the Salzburg Global Seminar, and a Phi Beta Kappa member. He is on the editorial boards of the Journal of International Relations and Development (Palgrave), the International Public Management Journal (Taylor & Francis), Journal of South-East Asian American Education & Advancement (University of Texas), and Politics and the Life Sciences (Allen Press).

=== Books ===
Ear authored Aid Dependence in Cambodia: How Foreign Assistance Undermines Democracy (Columbia University Press, 2013) and co-author of The Hungry Dragon: How China's Resources Quest is Reshaping the World (Routledge, 2013). A summary of Ear's book by his publisher explains that, in his view, “[i]nternational intervention and foreign aid resulted in higher maternal (and possibly infant and child) mortality rates and unprecedented corruption” in Cambodia by the mid-2000s. Ear concludes that “the more aid dependent a country, the more distorted its incentives to develop sustainably. Contrasting Cambodia's clothing sector with its rice and livestock sectors and internal handling of the avian flu epidemic, he showcases the international community's role in preventing Cambodia from controlling its national development.”

A review in the Huffington Post stated that “Sophal has avoided simplistic conclusions or easy condemnations of Cambodia’s donors” but lamented that “his prescriptions for improving aid...appear unlikely to meet with success in the current political climate.” The review concluded that while “foreign powers have been instrumental in creating what little political space currently exists for democracy” in Cambodia, “as Sophal has convincingly shown, genuine progress in the next 20 years will depend less on visiting American presidents than on Cambodians themselves.” A review in the Asia Times stated that “Cambodia's dependence on foreign aid is taken for granted by many observers but few have set out to examine it systematically and in detail,” and that Ear's book sheds major light on the subject. He reportedly depicts that foreign aid to Cambodia has distorted the nation's economy and claims donors bear much of the responsibility for the country's high level of corruption.

Ear is the co-author, with Sigfrido Burgos Cáceres, of The Hungry Dragon: How China's Resource Quest is Reshaping the World (Routledge, 2013). The book “explores China’s quest for energy sources, raw materials and natural resources around the world, with a specific emphasis on oil.” China's growing presence in Africa, Asia and Latin America is a major factor in the economic future of the world, as well as politics and national security. The book offers a comprehensive analysis of China's strategy on energy security.

=== Other publications ===
Ear has published in many journals, including ASEAN Economic Bulletin, Politics and the Life Sciences, Asian Security, Journal of Contemporary China, Geopolitics, Asian Survey, Development and Change, International Public Management Journal, and Asian Journal of Political Science. These include:

- Sophal Ear, “One Side of the Two Sided Switch: Ben Kiernan and the Khmer Rouge,” Khmer Conscience IX, no. 9 (Winter 1995)
- Ear, S., 2007. Does aid dependence worsen governance?. International Public Management Journal, 10(3), pp. 259–286.
- Ear, S., 2009. The political economy of aid and regime legitimacy in Cambodia. Beyond democracy in Cambodia: Political reconstruction in a post-conflict society, pp. 151–188.
- Sophal Ear, ‘Cambodian “justice”: without major personnel changes, the Khmer Rouge trial risks descending into farce’, Wall Street Journal, 1 Sept. 2009
- Doung, Virorth; Ear, Sophal (2010). "Transitional justice dilemma: the case of Cambodia". calhoun.nps.edu.
- Ear, S., 2011. The Persistence of Cambodian Poverty: From the Killing Fields to Today. Contemporary Southeast Asia: A Journal of International and Strategic Affairs, 33(3), pp. 397–399.

=== Film ===
He wrote and narrated the 2011 documentary film The End/Beginning: Cambodia, which tells the story of his escape from Cambodia. The film won awards at the New York Festivals International Television & Film Awards.

== Views ==
Ear has argued that aid dependency has had a deleterious impact on Cambodian development. Despite large GDP growth rates, Cambodia has continued to experience high levels of infant mortality and corruption, and a widening gap in wealth inequality. He has stated “Cambodia needs foreign exchange. It can’t just live by the credo of Aid or Die.” He has also asserted that Cambodia's production must diversify, stating, "There is little hope if we cannot produce more and more value-added exports. Cambodia needs these things to grow. Tourism alone cannot carry the economy.” Donor countries, he has maintained, are aware of the situation but choose to ignore it.

In a 2023 piece on Henry Kissinger, Ear argued that Operation Menu, a covert American bombing of eastern Cambodia, created the conditions in which the Khmer Rouge were able to come to power.

=== On Cambodian genocide denial ===
While still an undergraduate, Ear began writing extensively about scholars in the Western world who had minimized or denied the atrocities committed by the Khmer Rouge during their rule (1975–1979) in Cambodia. Ear called the apologists and pro-Khmer Rouge academics the "Standard Total Academic View on Cambodia" (STAV). The STAV, which he said included among its adherents almost all Cambodian scholars in the Western world, "hoped for, more than anything, a socialist success story with all the romantic ingredients of peasants, fighting imperialism, and revolution."

In particular, Ear criticized Noam Chomsky's support for the Khmer Rouge. "While my family worked and died in rice fields," Ear said, "Chomsky sharpened his theories and amended his arguments while seated in his armchair in Cambridge, Massachusetts. I believe that he would probably have me blame the Americans and their bombs for causing everything around the Khmer Rouge to go wrong." Ear has said that "perhaps someday Chomsky will acknowledge his 'honest errors' in his memoirs, speaking of the burdens of academia and the tragic irony of history. His victims, the peasants of Indochina, will write no memoirs and will be forgotten. They will be joined by his North Korean and Bosnian victims…For decades, Chomsky has vilified his critics as only a world class linguist can. However, for me and the surviving members of my family, questions about life under the Khmer Rouge are not intellectual parlour games."

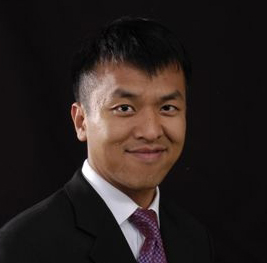

== Honors and awards ==
Ear has received several honors and awards including:

- 40 Under 40: Professors Who Inspire (2015)
- Foundation for the Defense of Democracies Academic Fellowship (2013)
- Khmerican's Must Watch Top 12 (2012)
- Gold World Medal in History and Society for “The End/Beginning: Cambodia” as Writer/Narrator, New York Festivals International Television & Film Awards (2012)
- Council on Foreign Relations Term-Member (2011-2016)
- Young Global Leader of the World Economic Forum (2011-2016)
- Fulbright Senior Specialist Awarded for the Institute of Security and International Studies, Chulalongkorn University, Bangkok, December 2010.
- AGD Prize Winner (RMB1,000) at the 4th Ditan International Conference on Infectious Diseases in Beijing, China, 15–18 July 2010.
- Fulbright Senior Specialist Program Roster admission (2009-2014)
- Top 10 papers in the Health & Economic Development category of the Social Science Research Network (SSRN.ORG), March 2010

== Personal life ==
On July 7, 2006, Ear married Chamnan Lim, a daughter of Lone Srey, and the late Lim Ho, in a non-denominational ceremony officiated by an American Baptist minister. The next day they married in a traditional Cambodian wedding ceremony.
