= Journal of Contemporary Asia =

- Discipline: Asian studies
- Language: English
- Edited by: Kevin Hewison

Publication details
- History: 1970-present
- Publisher: Routledge
- Frequency: 5/year
- Impact factor: 2.8 (2025)

Standard abbreviations
- ISO 4: J. Contemp. Asia

Indexing
- ISSN: 0047-2336 (print); 1752-7554 (web)
- LCCN: 78612738
- OCLC no.: 933308253

Links
- Journal homepage; Online access; Online archive

The Journal of Contemporary Asia is a peer-reviewed academic journal covering Asian studies. It was established in 1970 and is published 5 times a year by Routledge. The editor-in-chief is Kevin Hewison (University of North Carolina at Chapel Hill). Previous editors were Malcolm Caldwell, Jonathan Fast, Bruce McFarlane and Peter Limqueco.

== Abstracting and indexing ==
The journal is abstracted and indexed in:

- CAB International
- Current Contents/Social & Behavioral Sciences
- EBSCO databases
- International Political Science Abstracts
- ProQuest databases
- Scopus
- Social Sciences Citation Index

According to the Journal Citation Reports, the journal has a 2021 impact factor of 1.882.
