= Cambodia Relief Center =

Japanese organization that supported Democratic Kampuchea

- カンボジア救援センター
- Formation: April 9, 1980
- Founded at: Japan
- Secretary-General: Hideo Den

The Cambodia Relief Center (Japanese: カンボジア救援センター, Kanbojia Kyūen Sentā) was a Japanese organization established on 9 April 1980 that supported Democratic Kampuchea (the Khmer Rouge regime) after the Vietnamese invasion of Cambodia. Founded with Hideo Den, a member of the Socialist Democratic Federation, as secretary-general, the center described Vietnamese forces as an “army of aggression,” referred to areas controlled by the Pol Pot faction as “liberated zones,” and conducted fundraising and lecture campaigns in Japan under the banner of “Cambodian relief.” In August 1980 a Japanese parliamentary delegation associated with the center visited Democratic Kampuchea territory, met Khieu Samphan, and expressed support for the regime while accepting its claim that the Cambodian genocide was Vietnamese propaganda.

== Overview ==
The center was established on 9 April 1980, one year after the fall of Phnom Penh to Vietnamese forces and the establishment of the Heng Samrin government. It was founded with Hideo Den, then a member of the Socialist Democratic Federation (hereafter referred to as the SDF), serving as secretary-general.

== Activities ==
In 1980 the center described the Vietnamese forces then stationed in Cambodia as an "army of aggression" and the areas controlled by the Pol Pot faction as "liberated zones", and called for the "relief" of Cambodia.

In August 1980 a delegation consisting of Kiyoshi Mizuno (member of the House of Representatives, Liberal Democratic Party), Hideo Den, and Yutaka Hata (both members of the House of Councillors, SDF) visited the territory controlled by Democratic Kampuchea. This was the first visit by politicians from the Western bloc.

The delegation held talks with Khieu Samphan, then "prime minister" of Democratic Kampuchea, accepted the Democratic Kampuchea side's claim that the Cambodian genocide was fabricated propaganda by the enemy (Vietnam), and expressed "support and assistance" for the regime. After the delegation returned to Japan, the Cambodia Relief Center conducted fundraising and lecture activities throughout Japan under the banner of "Cambodian relief" with the aim of supporting the Khmer Rouge.

== Related people ==
The original promoters at the time of the center's founding in April 1980 were as follows.

Original promoters at the time of founding in April 1980
| Name | Position at the time |
|---|---|
| Makoto Ichikawa | Former chairman of Sōhyō |
| Izumi Inoue | Member of the House of Representatives |
| Tokuma Utsunomiya | Former member of the House of Representatives |
| Ryōkei Ōnishi | Chief priest of Kiyomizu-dera |
| Yōhei Kōno | Member of the House of Representatives |
| Masanori Kikuchi | Assistant professor at the University of Tokyo |
| Akira Kuroyanagi | Member of the House of Councillors |
| Kōzō Sasaki | Former member of the House of Representatives |
| Kazuo Shionoya | Member of the House of Representatives |
| Sunao Sonoda | Member of the House of Councillors |
| Hideo Den | Member of the House of Councillors |
| Mitsuo Tomizuka | Secretary-general of Sōhyō |
| Takako Doi | Member of the House of Representatives |
| Yutaka Hata | Member of the House of Councillors |
| Mitsusada Fukasaku | President of Kyoto Seika University |
| Shinsaku Hōgen | Advisor to the Japan International Cooperation Agency |
| Kōichi Yamamoto | Member of the House of Representatives |
| Rō Watanabe | Member of the House of Representatives |

== Criticism ==
Tanenori Soejima criticized the center's denial of the Cambodian genocide and its emphasis on the "aggressive" nature of the Vietnamese forces as "propaganda that goes against facts that should have been clearly recognized internationally."

== See also ==
- Japan-Cambodia Friendship Association – a contemporary Japanese friendship organization that supported the Pol Pot faction
