= Child PTSD Symptom Scale =

Psychological questionnaire

The Child PTSD Symptom Scale (CPSS) is a free checklist designed for children and adolescents to report traumatic events and symptoms that they might feel afterward. The items cover the symptoms of posttraumatic stress disorder (PTSD), specifically, the symptoms and clusters used in the DSM-IV. Although relatively new, there has been a fair amount of research on the CPSS due to the frequency of traumatic events involving children. The CPSS is usually administered to school children within school boundaries, or in an off-site location to assess symptoms of trauma. Some, but not all, people experience symptoms after a traumatic event, and in serious cases, these people may not get better on their own. Early and accurate identification, especially in children, of experiencing distress following a trauma could help with early interventions. The CPSS is one of a handful of promising measures that has accrued good evidence for reliability and validity, along with low cost, giving it good clinical utility as it addresses a public health need for better and larger scale assessment.

== Overview ==
The CPSS questionnaire covers the symptoms of PTSD, specifically in youth, using the definitions and criteria from DSM-IV. The current edition of the DSM (DSM-V) made changes to the diagnosis of PTSD, and new research needs to ascertain whether the DSM changes alter the accuracy of the CPSS. CPSS stands for Child PTSD Symptom Scale, CPSS-I is the CPSS Interview, and CPSS-SR is the CPSS Self Report.

The CPSS consists of 26 self-report measures to childhood PTSD diagnostic symptoms developed by Edna Foa, that assesses PTSD diagnostic criteria and symptom severity in children ages 8 to 18. It includes 2 event items, 17 symptom items, and 7 functional impairment items. Symptom items are rated on a 4-point frequency scale (0 = "not at all" to 3 = "5 or more times a week"). The CPSS gives a total symptom severity scale score (ranging from 0 to 51) and a total severity of impairment score (ranging from 0 to 7). The length of time to administer the test varies depending on who is administering the test, but it is shorter than other childhood PTSD exams such as the CPTSD-RI (Child Posttraumatic Stress Reaction Index), CITES-2 (Children's Impact of Traumatic Events Scale-Revised), and CPTSDI (Children's PTSD Inventory). The CPSS saves money and time by involving minimal interaction with clinicians to administer and is generally used to treat large groups of children at a time after a traumatic event.

== History ==
The test was created by Edna B. Foa and colleagues in 2001 as an adaptation to The PTSD Symptom Scale (PSS) created by Foa, Riggs, Dancu, & Rothbaum in 1993. The changes made between these two versions were mainly to make the vocabulary more easily understandable for youth.

The original version of the CPSS by Foa established a clinical cutoff score greater than or equal to 11 and yielded 95% sensitivity and 96% specificity. However, it has since been established that a clinical cutoff score of 15 is more appropriate.

The CPSS was created with the intention of quickly and efficiently assessing all PTSD symptoms in many children. The following DSM-IV criteria for PTSD needed to be assessed in the three symptom clusters using a 7 item assessment: re-experiencing, avoidance, arousal symptoms and trauma-related functional impairments. The severity of the symptoms above also needed to be assessed, and the CPSS would need to be able to predict the onset of PTSD symptoms in a child if they were to experience trauma. The test needed to be a more practical length for use in schools, research, and communities at large where children experienced trauma.

== Assessment ==
Psychological assessment is a psychological evaluation process used by clinicians, in order to help them properly produce a hypothesis from the collected patient information. The Child PTSD Symptom Scale is a self-report assessment that clinicians use to diagnose PTSD symptoms and their severity in children ages 8–18. However, PTSD can be diagnosed much earlier than 8 years of age, and sometimes the victim fears who report their traumatic experiences. Therefore, other measures, such as teacher and caregiver assessments, must be conducted.

Child PTSD Measures
Assessment	Version	Age	Length	Description
Child PTSD Symptom Scale (CPSS)	Self-Report	8-18	26-item	
Trauma Symptom Checklist for Children (TSCC)	Self-Report	8-16	54-item	
Trauma Symptom Checklist for Young Children (TSCYC)	Caretaker	3-12	90-item	
Parent Report of the Child's Reaction to Stress	Caretaker	N/A	79-item	
PTSD Scale for DSM-5: Child/Adolescent Version (CAPS-CA-5)	Clinician	7+	30-item	

== Use in other populations ==
Versions are available in English and Spanish. The CPSS has also been tested in Nepali, Turkish and Norwegian populations.

The CPSS was used with 479 Turkish children screen for PTSD symptoms related to the 2011 Van earthquake.

== Limitations ==
The CPSS scale assesses avoidance and change of activities, which may not accurately reflect pathology. This could possibly result in higher PTSD prevalence estimations. In a study, the CPSS scale correctly classified 72.2% of children. Nearly one-quarter of children were misclassified and 5.6% were misclassified (false negative). CPSS is a self-reporting assessment and is, therefore, subject to social desirability bias. Social desirability bias influences respondents to answer questions in a way that presents them more favorably to others. This interferes with the purpose of the assessment and prevents clinicians from properly screening for PTSD.

The CPTSD-RI, along with all other assessments attempting to measure the severity of child PTSD, had several limitations. First, the CPTSD-RI did not assess for all of the PTSD symptoms and thus could not provide an accurate assessment of PTSD severity. Additionally, the CPTSD-RI did not assess for functional impairment related to experience with trauma, a limit of many other self-report assessments. These limitations can be combatted by structured interviews given by trained therapists in schools or in a clinical setting. This, however, is problematic because personal interviews are expensive for the families or schools that take part in them, especially when large groups of children are studied, and time-consuming. Thus, the CPSS was created to combat these limitations without the need for a supplemental interview. Validated screening tests like the CPSS tests the efficacy of treatment techniques. Without CPSS, the treatments would have no valid test, and children who have experienced trauma will not get the help they require.

== See also ==
- PTSD Symptom Scale – Self-Report Version
- PTSD
- Childhood Trauma
