= Richard Dudman =

American journalist

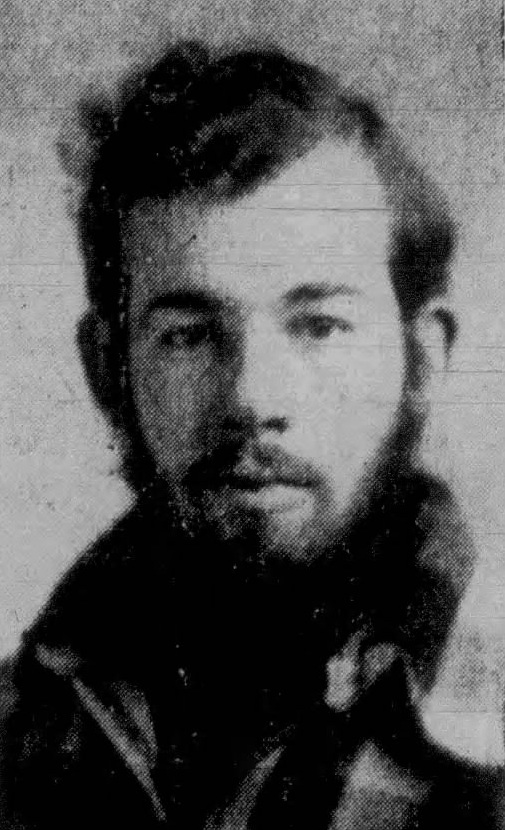
- Dudman in 1942
- Born: May 3, 1918; Centerville, Iowa, U.S.
- Died: August 3, 2017 (aged 99)
- Occupation: Journalist
- Known for: Spent 31 years with the St. Louis Post-Dispatch

Richard Beebe Dudman (May 3, 1918 – August 3, 2017) was an American journalist who spent 31 years with the St. Louis Post-Dispatch during which time he covered Fidel Castro's insurgency in Cuba, the assassination of President John F. Kennedy, the invasion of Cuba at the Bay of Pigs, the Watergate scandal, the Iran-Contra scandal, the Khmer Rouge, and wars and revolutions in Latin America, the Middle East, and the Far East. He was chief of the Washington bureau during the 1970s which landed him on the master list of Nixon political opponents.

== Biography ==
Dudman was born in Centerville, Iowa. He majored in journalism and economics at Stanford University, where he wrote for the school paper, graduating in 1940. During World War II, he served in the merchant marines, dodging German submarines in the North Atlantic. He joined the U.S. Naval Reserve in 1942 and served four years, becoming executive officer of his ship.

He started his journalism career at The Denver Post, where he wrote for four years before joining the Post-Dispatch in 1949. Dudman reported on the assassination of President John F. Kennedy in Dallas, Texas, on November 22, 1963. He reported seeing an entrance bullet hole in the windshield of the presidential limousine.

In May 1970, he was captured by the Viet Cong and held captive in Cambodia, an experience he wrote about in his book Forty Days With the Enemy. A few days after his release, he and his wife hosted a young Bill Clinton who was working in Washington for the summer as part of Project Pursestrings.

In December 1978 he was a member, along with Elizabeth Becker and Malcolm Caldwell, of the only group of Western journalists and writers invited to visit Cambodia since the Khmer Rouge had taken power in April 1975. During this visit Caldwell was murdered under mysterious circumstances.

On his last day as Washington bureau chief, in 1981, he ran up Connecticut Avenue to cover the shooting of President Ronald Reagan. He moved to Maine after retirement, but continued to work for the Post-Dispatch. From 2000 to 2012, he was the Bangor Daily News' senior contributing editor, writing over 1,000 editorials. In 1993, he won the George Polk Career Award. He died on August 3, 2017, at the age of 99.

== Selected works ==
- Forty Days With the Enemy
- Men of the far right

== See also ==
- Meeting with Pol Pot (movie)
