= Elizabeth Becker (journalist) =

American author and journalist (born 1947)

Becker in 2026

Elizabeth Becker (born October 28, 1947) is an American journalist and author. She has written five books and is best known for her reporting and writing on Cambodia.

== Biography ==
Elizabeth Becker graduated from the University of Washington with a degree in South Asian Studies and studied language at the Kendriya Hindi Sansthan in Agra, India. She was an Edelman fellow at the Joan Shorenstein Center on the Press, Politics and Public Policy at Harvard Kennedy School. Her papers on Cambodia and the Khmer Rouge are held at The University of Washington Southeast Asia Library as the Elizabeth Becker collection.

Becker is the mother of two adult children, Lily and Lee Hoagland. She is married to William L. Nash and lives in Washington, D.C.

== Career ==
Becker began her career reporting from Cambodia during the Vietnam War for the Washington Post as a local stringer. She joined the newspaper’s staff in Washington. She was the Senior Foreign Editor of National Public Radio where she received two DuPont Columbia awards as executive producer for reporting South Africa's first democratic elections and the Rwandan genocide.

Becker is the author of You Don't Belong Here: How Three Women Rewrote the Story of War, which won the 2022 Goldsmith Book Prize from Harvard and the 2022 Sperber Prize from Fordham. Her first book When the War Was Over: Cambodia and the Khmer Rouge Revolution won a Robert F. Kennedy book citation. That book includes her visit to Cambodia under the Khmer Rouge and interview of Pol Pot. Rithy Panh made the documentary film Bophana based on an excerpt of the book. Her early investigation of the Khmer Rouge was detailed in A Problem from Hell: America in the Age of Genocide by Samantha Power. She is also the author of Overbooked: The Exploding Business of Travel and Tourism and America's Vietnam War: A Narrative History for young adults.

Becker was summoned to testify as an expert witness before the Khmer Rouge genocide tribunal known officially as the Extraordinary Chambers in the Courts of Cambodia.

=== 1978 visit to Cambodia ===
In December 1978, Becker was a member, with Malcolm Caldwell and Richard Dudman, of the only group of Western journalists and writers to visit Cambodia since the Khmer Rouge had taken power in April 1975. On December 22, their last day in the country, the three interviewed Pol Pot, the communist leader of Cambodia. Pol Pot told Becker and Dudman he expected NATO to help him fight against communist Vietnam. He spoke to Caldwell about economics. They returned to their guest house in Phnom Penh when, at about 11:00 p.m. that night Becker was awakened by the sound of gunfire. She stepped out of her bedroom and saw a heavily armed man, in a baseball cap, who pointed a pistol at her. She ran back into her room and heard people moving and more gunshots. Several hours later a Khmer Rouge diplomat came to her bedroom door and told her that Caldwell was dead. She and Dudman went to his room. He had been shot in the chest and the body of a unidentified man was also in the room, possibly the same man who had pointed the pistol at Becker.

== Books ==
- When the War Was Over: Cambodia and the Khmer Rouge Revolution. New York: Simon & Schuster. 1986. ISBN 0-671-41787-8. OCLC 13334079.
- America's Vietnam War: A Narrative History. New York: Clarion Books. 1992. ISBN 0-395-59094-9. OCLC 24795769.
- Overbooked: The Exploding Business of Travel and Tourism. New York: Simon & Schuster. 2013. ISBN 9781439160992. OCLC 800024781.
- You Don't Belong Here: How Three Women Rewrote the Story of War. PublicAffairs. 2021. ISBN 978-1541768208.

== See also ==
- Meeting with Pol Pot (2024 film)
