= PTSD Symptom Scale – Self-Report Version =

- Purpose: assess symptoms of posttraumatic stress disorder

PTSD Symptom Scale – Self-Report Version (PSS-SR) is a 17-item self-reported questionnaire to assess symptoms of posttraumatic stress disorder. Each of the 17 items describe PTSD symptoms which respondents rate in terms of their frequency or severity using a Likert-type scale ranging from 0 (not at all or only one time) to 3 (almost always or five or more times per week). Ratings on items are summed to create three subscales – re-experiencing, avoidance coping, and psychological hyperarousal (such as "jumpiness") – as well as a total score (that ranges from 0 to 51). All items of the PSS-SR should be answered, and assessment is done by total score. The total score higher than 13 indicates on likelihood of PTSD.

== See also ==
- Child PTSD Symptom Scale
- Diagnostic classification and rating scales used in psychiatry
