= Meeting with Pol Pot =

- Theatrical release poster
- Directed by: Rithy Panh
- Screenplay by: Rithy Panh; Pierre-Erwan Guillaume
- Based on: When the War Was Over: Cambodia and the Khmer Rouge Revolution by Elizabeth Becker
- Produced by: Catherine Dussart; Roger Huang; Justine O.
- Starring: Irène Jacob; Grégoire Colin; Cyril Gueï
- Cinematography: Aymerick Pilarski
- Edited by: Matthieu Laclau; Rithy Panh
- Music by: Marc Marder
- Production companies: Anupheap Productions; CDP
- Distributed by: Sophie Dulac Distribution (France); Westec Media (Cambodia)
- Release dates: May 16, 2024 (Cannes); June 5, 2024 (France); August 9, 2024 (Cambodia)
- Running time: 112 minutes
- Countries: Cambodia; France; Turkey; Taiwan; Qatar
- Languages: French; Khmer

Meeting with Pol Pot (French: Rendez-vous avec Pol Pot, Khmer: ណាត់ជួបជាមួយ ប៉ុល ពត, romanized: natchuob cheamuoy bol pot) is a 2024 drama film co-written and directed by Rithy Panh. Starring Irène Jacob, Grégoire Colin and Cyril Gueï. It is partially based on real events and on the book When the War Was Over: Cambodia and the Khmer Rouge Revolution by Elizabeth Becker.

Meeting with Pol Pot had its world premiere at the 77th Cannes Film Festival on 16 May 2024 in the Cannes Premiere section. The film was selected as the Cambodian entry for the Best International Feature Film at the 97th Academy Awards, but was not nominated.

== Synopsis ==
Democratic Kampuchea (Cambodia) -- 1978. Three French journalists, Lise, Alain, and Paul are invited by the Khmer Rouge to conduct an exclusive interview of the regime's leader, Pol Pot. Over the course of several days prior to their meeting they are led through a series of staged encounters presenting the revolutionary state as a success. While Alain, a communist, appears to be highly credulous of the regime's claims of success, Lise and Paul are skeptical, seeing evidence of deception. Lise is further frustrated by their hosts' refusal to let them visit the countryside or specific individuals with whom Lise had contact prior to the revolution.

Slipping away from the group's escort, Paul walks through the jungle and comes across human remains and evidence of actual living conditions concealed by the government. Paul's camera and film are confiscated by the soldiers, though one roll containing photographs of human remains is found by Lise in her typewriter. Incensed at the staging of their visit, Paul lashes out at the guards and subsequently disappears from the film, likely killed: Cambodian party officials variously claim to the remaining two journalists that he must have gotten lost in the jungle, been a spy for the CIA or KGB, or otherwise a counterrevolutionary.

Lise and Alain meet with Pol Pot in a brief and heavily-controlled interview. Alain is subsequently granted a second, private audience with Pol Pot in which he expresses ideological support for the aims of the Khmer Rouge, but expresses concerns about their practices and the ability of the state to succeed. Later that night, Alain is shot by a soldier in his bedroom. Lise leaves the country alone.

== Cast ==
- Irène Jacob as Lise Delbo
- Grégoire Colin as Alain Cariou
- Cyril Gueï as Paul Thomas
- Bun-Hok Lim as Camarade Sung
- Somaline Mao as Ieng Thirith
- Sovann Nhoeb as Chan
- Paov Pitu as Ta Mok
- Siden In as Chef d'atelier
- Sophourn Has as Ieng Sary
- Tithya Nouhem as The interpreter
- Sok Sothun as The Old Man
- Sokong Heng as Sikoeurn
- Rithy Panh as Pol Pot (voice/silhouette) (uncredited)

== Release ==
It had its world premiere on May 16, 2024, at the 77th Cannes Film Festival, then was released on June 5, 2024, in French theaters and on August 9, 2024, in Cambodian theaters.

== Reception ==
On the review aggregator website Rotten Tomatoes, 89% of 18 critics' reviews are positive, with an average rating of 6.5/10. Metacritic, which uses a weighted average, assigned the film a score of 83 out of 100, based on 8 critics, indicating "universal acclaim".

== See also ==
- List of submissions to the 97th Academy Awards for Best International Feature Film
- List of Cambodian submissions for the Academy Award for Best International Feature Film
