= François Ponchaud =

French Catholic priest and missionary (1939–2025)

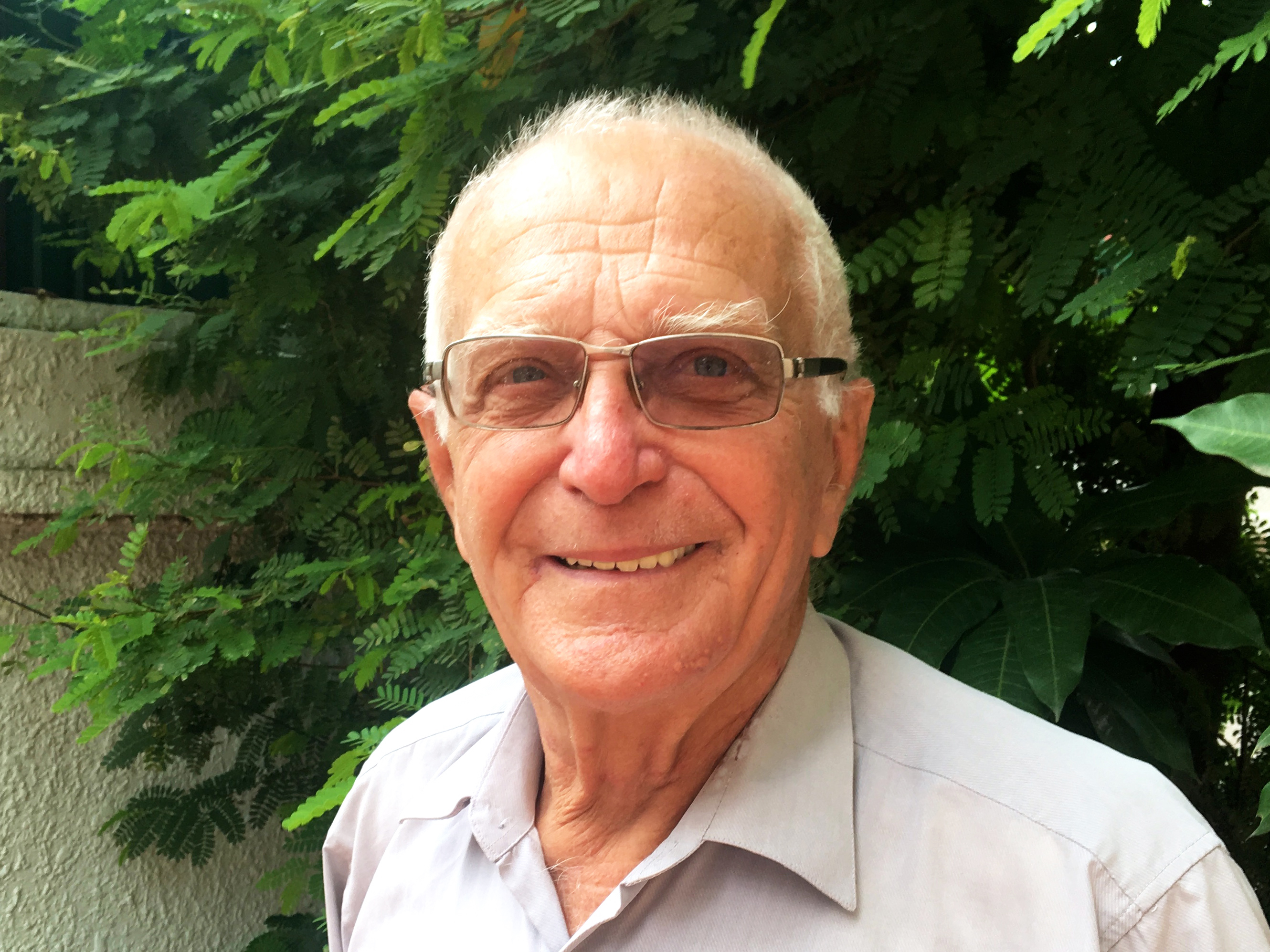
- Ponchaud in 2017
- Born: 8 February 1939; Sallanches, France
- Died: 27 January 2025 (aged 85); Lauris, France
- Occupation(s): Catholic priest, missionary and author

François Ponchaud (French: [fʁɑ̃swa pɔ̃ʃo]; 8 February 1939 – 17 January 2025) was a French Catholic priest and missionary to Cambodia. He was best known for his documentation of the genocide which occurred under the Khmer Rouge (KR), and for being one of the first people to expose the human rights abuses being carried out at the time.

== Biography ==
Ponchaud was born in Sallanches, France on 8 February 1939, as one of twelve children. Until he was 20 years old, he worked on his parents' farm. He attended seminary in 1958 but the following year he left due to national service. He spent three years in Algeria as a paratrooper during the Algerian War and returned to his studies in 1961, becoming a Jesuit. He applied through the Paris Foreign Missions Society for an assignment to undertake missionary work, and was assigned to Cambodia. In 2013, Ponchaud recalled, "I didn’t like the war [...] Now I think I’d rather be killed or go to prison than participate in such a war, but at the time I didn’t dare go to prison."

Ponchaud was 26 years old and newly ordained when he arrived in Cambodia in 1965. He lived in Cambodia from 1965 to 1975, serving in the apostolic prefecture of Kampong Cham province. When Phnom Penh fell to the KR on 17 April 1975, Ponchaud was detained in the French embassy. On 8 May 1975, the KR evacuated the embassy, and Ponchaud was one of the last westerners to leave Cambodia. He was fluent in Khmer. After expulsion, Ponchaud collected hundreds of written and oral accounts from refugees along the border with Thailand and in France.

Following the KR victory, all contact with the outside world was shut down, but following an editorial in Le Monde in February 1976, Ponchaud wrote a three-page article, which described the systematic abuses he had witnessed while Phnom Penh was being emptied, and following this he wrote Cambodge année zéro (Cambodia: Year Zero), a book on the Cambodian genocide, which was published in 1977, and his book is credited with being one of the first publications which dealt with the genocide. William Shawcross has said that the book is, "the best account of Khmer Rouge rule".

For four years after his expulsion, he and François Bizot helped Cambodian and French citizens escape from Cambodia. Following the overthrow of the KR in 1979, he returned to Cambodia. He gave evidence at the Extraordinary Chambers in the Courts of Cambodia in 2013 during the war crime trials were being held. While on the stand, he said that he had been a witness to the "illegal" bombing, known as Operation Menu, of Cambodia by the American air force, and that Henry Kissinger, former Secretary of State should stand trial for his actions. Ponchaud testified in Khmer.

Ponchaud said of the genocide that it, "Was above all, the translation into action the particular vision of a man [sic]: A person who has been spoiled by a corrupt regime cannot be reformed, he must be physically eliminated from the brotherhood of the pure." In testimony given on what had happened to officers from the former Lon Nol regime, Ponchaud stated that in 1975 the KR had as an aim the destruction of anyone who had cooperated with both the US and the previous regime, and that he had heard from four witnesses that the KR had killed 380 people in Phnom Thipdey, a commune in Battambang Province.

In 2001 a documentary titled The Cross and the Bodhi Tree: Two Christian Encounters with Buddhism was released, the film is about how Buddhism shaped both the life of Ponchaud, and that of a Protestant nun, Mother Rosemary.

Ponchaud said in 2021, that his aim "is helping people to understand clearly what Buddha taught and what Jesus said in the Gospels, helping them to live together and love one another,” and that "The teaching of Buddha, and meditation, allowed me to become a better Christian".

Ponchaud died from cancer on 17 January 2025, at the age of 85 at a Jesuit retirement home in Lauris, France.

== Published works ==
- Cambodia: Year Zero, Penguin, 1978, ISBN 978-0030403064
- Social Change in the Vortex of Revolution, in: Cambodia 1975-1978: Rendezvous with Death, Princeton University Press, 1989, Karl Jackson, ed., pp. 151–177. ISBN 978-0691025414
- La cathédrale de la rizière: 450 ans d'histoire de l'église au Cambodge, Fayard, 1990, ISBN 978-2866790691
- Buddha e Cristo: le due salvezze, EDB, 2005, ISBN 978-8810604205
- Brève histoire du Cambodge: Le pays des Khmers rouges, Magellan & Cie Éditions, 2015

== Bibliography ==
- Bartrop, Paul R. (2012). A Biographical Encyclopedia of Contemporary Genocide. ABC-CLIO. ISBN 978-0313386787.
- Beachler, Donald W. (2011). The Genocide Debate: Politicians, Academics, and Victims. Palgrave Macmillan. ISBN 978-0230114142.
- Channer, Alan. "The Cross and the Bodhi Tree: Two Christian Encounters with Buddhism". Alexander Street Press. Archived from the original on 5 August 2016.
- Colin, Erika (10 December 2008). "Priest tried to warn of Cambodia's insanity". CNN.
- Frey, Rebecca Joyce (2009). Genocide and International Justice. Facts On File. ISBN 978-0816073108.
- Kozlovski, Mary (10 April 2013). ""Ghost Country": Francois Ponchaud's Testimony Continues". Cambodia Tribunal.
- "François Ponchaud calls for trials against Nixon, Kissinger for America's bombing of Cambodia". Cambodia Herald. 9 April 2013. Archived from the original on 4 January 2014.
- "Father François beyond Year Zero". Phnom penh Post. 11 April 2013.
- "Year Zero author on justice". Phnom penh Post. 8 January 2014.
- Podhoretz, Norman (2010). "Controversies and Consequences: Interpreting the War". In Andrew Jon Rotter (ed.). Light at the End of the Tunnel: A Vietnam War Anthology (3rd Revised ed.). Rowman & Littlefield. pp. 337–451. ISBN 978-0742561335.
- Tyner, James A. (2012). Genocide and the Geographical Imagination: Life and Death in Germany, China, and Cambodia. Rowman & Littlefield. ISBN 978-1442208988.
