= Outline of the Cambodian genocide =

Cambodian genocide
- Part of the Cold War in Asia and the aftermath of the Cambodian Civil War
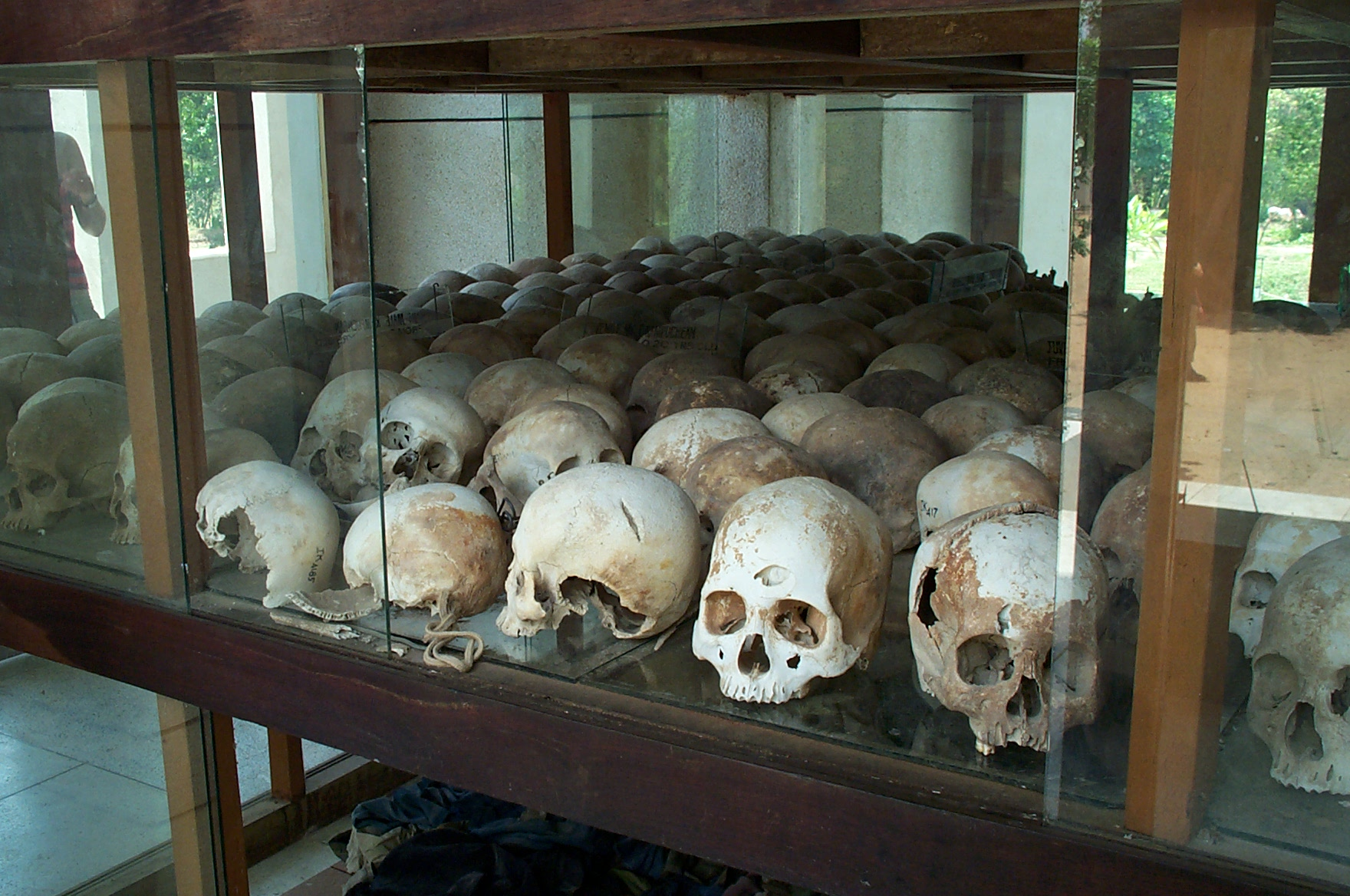
- Skulls at the Choeung Ek memorial in Cambodia
- Location: Democratic Kampuchea (present-day Cambodia)
- Date: 17 April 1975 – 7 January 1979 (3 years, 8 months and 20 days)
- Target: Cambodia's previous military and political leadership, middle-class professionals, businesspeople, intellectuals along with ethnic, linguistic, and religious minorities
- Attack type: Genocide, ethnic cleansing, mass murder, cultural genocide, famine, forced labour, torture, mass rape, summary execution
- Deaths: 1.2–2.2 million
- Perpetrators: Khmer Rouge, Kampuchea Revolutionary Army, Santebal, Communist Party of Kampuchea
- Motive: Establishment of an agrarian socialist society based on Maoist principles; Cultural reset (Year Zero); Khmer nationalism and racism; Xenophobia; Anti-Vietnamese sentiment; Anti-Western sentiment; Anti-intellectualism; Anti-religious sentiment

This is a topical outline of Wikipedia articles about the Cambodian genocide.

The Cambodian genocide (Note: Khmer: ប្រល័យពូជសាសន៍នៅកម្ពុជា, lit. 'Genocide in Cambodia', or អំពើប្រល័យពូជសាសន៍ខ្មែរ, 'Khmer genocidal act(s)') was the systematic persecution and killing of Cambodian citizens (Note: In 2010, the Extraordinary Chambers in the Courts of Cambodia ruled for the indictment of Nuon Chea and Khieu Samphan that both former Khmer Rouge officials are guilty of committing ethnic cleansing exclusively against ethnic Vietnamese and Chams.) by the Khmer Rouge under the general secretaryship of Pol Pot. It resulted in the deaths of approximately 2 million people from 1975 to 1979, around 25% of Cambodia's population in 1975 (c. 7.8 million).

== Overviews ==
- Cambodian genocide
- Bibliography of the Cambodian genocide
- Cambodian genocide denial
- Cambodian humanitarian crisis - Events resulting in death, displacement or resettlement abroad
- Child soldiers in Cambodia
- Pol Pot (1925–1998) - Cambodian communist leader

== Background ==
- 1970 Cambodian coup d'état - Coup that overthrew Prince Norodom Sihanouk
- Cambodian Civil War (1967–1975) - Conflict in Cambodia
- Communist Party of Kampuchea - Ruling party of Cambodia from 1975 to 1979
- Fall of Phnom Penh (1975) - Khmer Rouge capture of the Cambodian capital
- Khmer Republic (1970–1975) - Country in Southeast Asia
- Khmer Rouge (1951–1999) - Cambodian communist movement that ruled Democratic Kampuchea
- Lon Nol (1913–1985) - Prime Minister of Cambodia (1966–1967, 1969–1971)
- Norodom Sihanouk (1922–2012) - King of Cambodia (1941–1955, 1993–2004)
- Operation Freedom Deal (1970–1973) - Part of the Vietnam and Cambodian Civil Wars
- Operation Menu (1969–1970) - US covert military operation in Cambodia
- Royal Government of National Union of Kampuchea (1970–1976) - Cambodian government-in-exile

== Events ==
- Ba Chúc massacre - Mass killing in Vietnam
- Chankiri Tree
- Choeung Ek - Killing field and mass grave in Cambodia
- Concert for Kampuchea (1980) - Film by Keith Macmillan
- Concerts for the People of Kampuchea (1979) - Series of concerts in London, England
- Dangrek Incident (1979) - Thai-Cambodian border incident
- Eastern Zone massacres (1978) - Khmer Rouge purge in Cambodia

== Aftermath ==
- 1991 Paris Peace Agreements (1991) - Settlement that ended the Cambodian–Vietnamese War and the Third Indochina War
- Allegations of United States support for the Khmer Rouge
- Cambodian–Vietnamese War (1978–1989) - Conflict between Vietnam and the Khmer Rouge
- Coalition Government of Democratic Kampuchea (1982–1992) - Cambodian government in exile
- K5 Plan - Vast defensive belt along the Cambodian-Thai border
- Khao-I-Dang - Refugee camp in Thailand
- Khmer Rouge insurgency (1979–1998) - Armed conflict in Cambodia
- Khmer Rouge Tribunal (1997) - Cambodian–UN court to try Khmer Rouge leaders
- National Army of Democratic Kampuchea - Cambodian guerrilla force
- National Day of Remembrance (Cambodia) - Annual event in Cambodia
- People's Republic of Kampuchea (1979–1992) - Cambodian state
- People's Revolutionary Tribunal (Cambodia) - Established by the People's Republic of Kampuchea
- United Nations Transitional Authority in Cambodia (1992–1993) - Peacekeeping mission

== Miscellaneous ==
- Child soldiers in Cambodia
- The Drakkars - Cambodian band
- New People (Cambodia) - Civilian Cambodians exploited by the Khmer Rouge
- Year Zero (political notion) - Idea put into practice by Pol Pot in Cambodia

== Places ==
- Documentation Center of Cambodia (1995) - Cambodian NGO documenting the Khmer Rouge era
- Killing caves of Phnom Sampeau - Khmer Rouge execution site in Cambodia
- Killing Fields - Sites of mass execution by the Khmer Rouge
- Tuol Sleng Genocide Museum - Former Khmer Rouge prison in Cambodia

== Killing Fields ==
- Chankiri Tree
- Choeung Ek - Killing field and mass grave in Cambodia
- Killing caves of Phnom Sampeau - Khmer Rouge execution site in Cambodia
- Killing Fields - Sites of mass execution by the Khmer Rouge
- The Killing Fields (film) (1984) - Film by Roland Joffé
- The Killing Fields (soundtrack) (1984) - Soundtrack album by Mike Oldfield

== Works about the Cambodian genocide ==
=== Books ===
- Alive in the Killing Fields (2009) - Memoir by Nawuth Keat
- The Elimination (2011) - Memoir by Rithy Panh and Christophe Bataille
- First They Killed My Father - Book by Loung Ung
- A History of Democratic Kampuchea (1975–1979) - Cambodian textbook written by Khamboly, Dy
- In the Shadow of the Banyan - Novel by Vaddey Ratner
- When the War Was Over (1986) - Book by Elizabeth Becker

=== Films ===
- Cambodia: Between War and Peace (1991) - Cambodian film
- The Conscience of Nhem En (2008) - American film
- Deacon of Death (2004) - Film
- Devět kruhů pekla (1989) - Film
- Don't Think I've Forgotten (2014) - American documentary film by John Pirozzi
- Enemies of the People (film) (2009) - British-Cambodian documentary film
- First They Killed My Father (film) (2017) - Cambodian-American film by Angelina Jolie
- Funan (film) (2019) - Animated period drama film directed by Denis Do
- The Golden Voice (2006 film) (2006) - American film
- The Killing Fields (film) (1984) - Film by Roland Joffé
- La-Tha-Pii (2006) - Thai film
- The Land of the Wandering Souls (2000) - Cambodian film
- Lost Loves (film) (2010) - Film
- Meeting with Pol Pot (2024) - Cambodian film
- The Missing Picture (2013) - Film
- Monkey Dance (2004) - Documentary film by Julie Mallozzi
- New Year Baby (2006) - Film
- Red Wedding (film) (2012) - Documentary film by Lida Chan and Guillaume Suon
- The Road to Freedom (film) (2010) - American film
- S-21: The Khmer Rouge Killing Machine (2003) - Documentary film directed by Rithy Panh
- Samsara: Death and Rebirth in Cambodia (1989) - Film
- Shadow of Darkness (1989) - Cambodian film directed by Yvon Hem
- Year Zero: The Silent Death of Cambodia (1979) - British TV programme

=== Other works ===
- Holiday in Cambodia (1980) - Song by Dead Kennedys
- The Killing Fields (soundtrack) (1984) - Soundtrack album by Mike Oldfield
- Vann Nath paintings - Series of paintings depicting torture at S-21 prison

== See also ==
- Bibliography of Genocide studies
- Bibliography of the Cambodian genocide
- Outline of the Red Terror (Russia)
- Outline of the California genocide
