= Child soldiers in Cambodia =

Child soldiers were used by the Khmer Rouge and other armed groups during the Cambodian Civil War, Cambodian genocide, and insurgent armed conflict into the late 1990s.

== Overview ==
There is substantial evidence that tens of thousands of children were indoctrinated and forced to participate in warfare and commit atrocities by the Khmer Rouge. Other factions of the conflict also conscripted children. Child soldiers were used by the Lon Nol army in the Khmer Republic. In the 1990s, Licadho published reports of child soldiers within the Royal Cambodian Armed Forces (RCAF). Members of the RCAF who joined as children were permitted to remain in the institution after civil conflict ended and they entered adulthood. Efforts at demobilisation of children took place in the 1990s. Former Khmer Rouge child soldiers received little state support in the 21st century.

== See also ==
- Outline of the Cambodian genocide
- Bibliography of the Cambodian genocide
