= Vaddey Ratner =

Cambodian-American novelist

- Education: Cornell University

Vaddey Ratner is a Cambodian–American author and novelist.

== Career ==
Her first novel In the Shadow of the Banyan was a finalist for the 2013 Hemingway Foundation/PEN Award and the 2013 Book of the Year Indies Choice Book Award. It was also one of five books that received an Adult Debut Honor Award from the American Booksellers Association. Her second novel Music of the Ghosts, published in 2017, was longlisted for the Aspen Words Literary Prize of 2018.

== Personal life ==
Vaddey Ratner (née Vaddey Ayuravann Sisowath) is a war refugee and a survivor of the Khmer Rouge genocide. Born into the Sisowath line of the royal family in Cambodia, Ratner was five years old when the Khmer Rouge seized power in 1975, and for the next four years, she and her family endured forced labor, starvation, and violent persecution. In 1979, after the Khmer Rouge regime collapsed, she and her mother survived, while the rest of her immediate family had perished, along with more than a million other Cambodians. Shortly after, the two fled Cambodia, escaping across the border to the Khao I Dang refugee camp in Thailand. In 1981, she immigrated to the United States and lived with her mother in Missouri. After graduating from high school as her class valedictorian in 1990, Ratner attended Cornell University, where she graduated summa cum laude, specializing in Asian history and literature.

After graduating from Cornell University, Ratner lived in the Washington D.C. area while working in international affairs. Over the years, she and her husband Blake Ratner, founder of Collaborating for Resilience, an international environmental policy initiative, and their daughter have lived in Malaysia, Thailand, and Cambodia. She and her family now reside in Potomac, Maryland.
