= Eastern Zone massacres =

Khmer Rouge purge in Cambodia (1978)

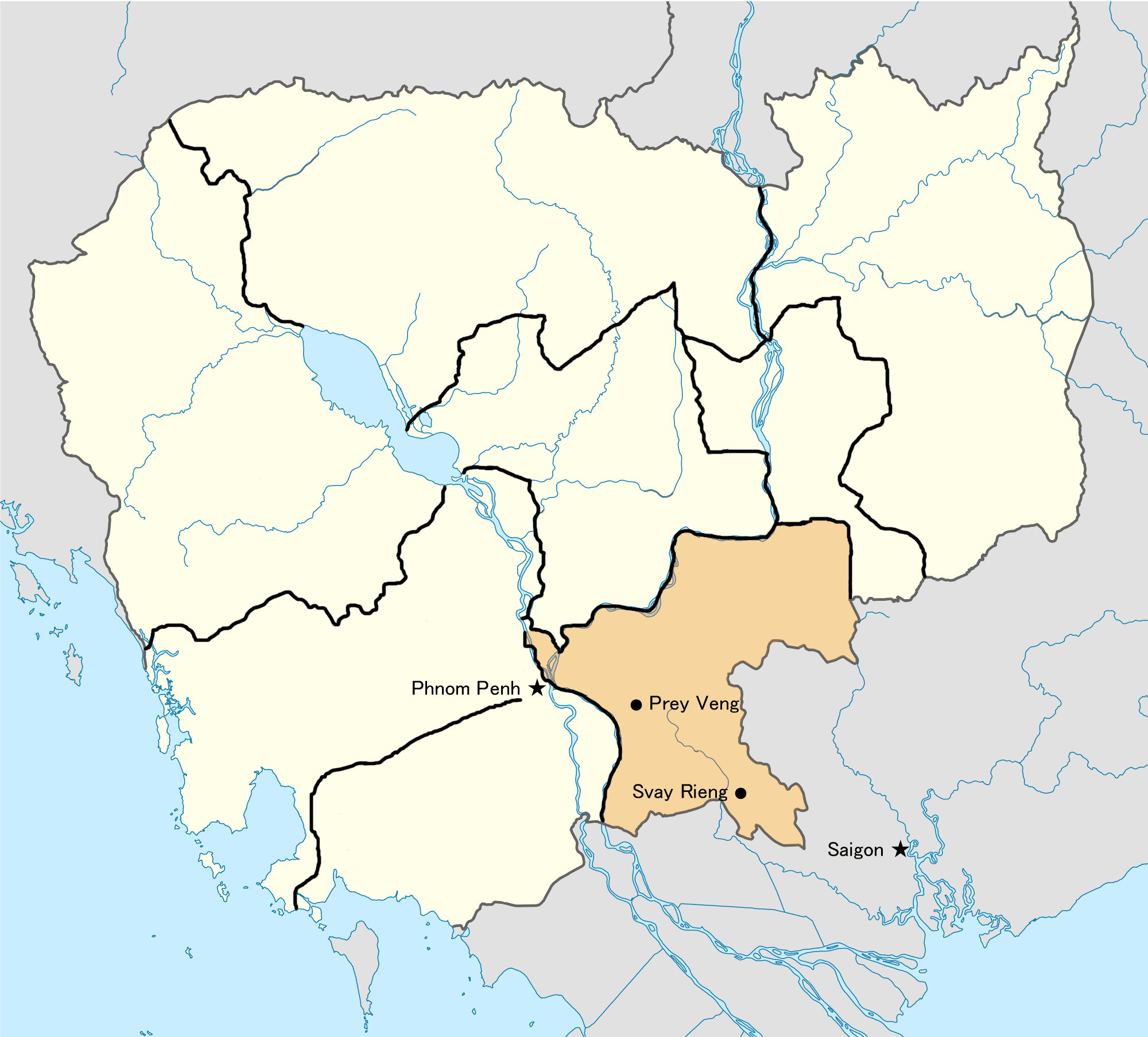
Map of the Eastern Zone.

Eastern Zone massacres refers to killings perpetrated by the Khmer Rouge in the Eastern Region of Democratic Kampuchea in 1978 during the Cambodian genocide. They differ from the persecutions and killings of professionals, intellectuals, and ethnic minorities which the Khmer Rouge perpetrated in the rest of the country because the killings were result of a purge that occurred within the Khmer Rouge's ranks.

== Background ==
The Eastern Zone of Cambodia borders Vietnam and it was also the region where Pol Pot and his cadres started their guerrilla struggle. After the Fall of Phnom Penh, the Eastern Region was run by cadres who were more closely connected with Vietnam rather than with the core Party Center. Pol Pot suspected the loyalty of the leaders of the eastern branches and sought to purge his ranks of elements which he considered too moderate. Persecutions and routine "evacuations" of people to the West escalated into an invasion by the Party Center's army of the Eastern Zone of Cambodia in 1978.

== Massacres ==
The series of massacres which took place in 1978 were the most serious of all of the massacres which took place during the Pol Pot regime's genocide. It was described as a "massive and indiscriminate purges of party, army and people alike". Of a population of about 1.5 million in the Eastern Zone, it is estimated that 250,000 people were killed during the last six months of 1978. This is the zone where the Cham people, the most persecuted minority at that time, were mostly present. Where in this massacre, they were most affected and almost faced extinction.

So Phim, the East Zone commander was forced to commit suicide in one raid. Many Khmer Rouge cadres fled to Vietnam in order to avoid being purged, one of them was Hun Sen, who later returned as one of the leaders of the Vietnamese-sponsored rebel army and became the Prime Minister of Cambodia.

== Other massacres ==
At the same time, the Khmer Rouge cadres also killed hundreds of thousands of Khmer opponents - and civilians, Vietnamese, and Chams in other zones after being deported there from the eastern zone.

All Khmers from the eastern zone were forced to wear blue scarves to easily identify them for execution. One eyewitness recalls how a trainload of 3,000 eastern zone people were all executed upon arrival to Battambang.

== See also ==
- Bibliography of the Cambodian genocide
