= In the Shadow of the Banyan =

Novel by Vaddey Ratner

- First edition (US)
- Author: Vaddey Ratner
- Publisher: Simon Schuster

In the Shadow of the Banyan is novel written by Vaddey Ratner and published in 2012. The story reflects the experiences that the author lived through in Cambodia under the reign of the Khmer Rouge.

== Plot ==
In the novel, 7 year old Raami lives through the reign of the Khmer Rouge and the Cambodian Civil War. As royalty, her father is in danger for his life and the family spends the war dealing with starvation, brutal forced labor, death, and survival.

== Recognition ==
The book was a finalist for the 2013 PEN/Hemingway Award and the 2013 Book of the Year Indies Choice Award.
