= Cambodian genocide =

1970s genocide of Cambodian citizens

- Part of the Cold War in Asia and the aftermath of the Cambodian Civil War
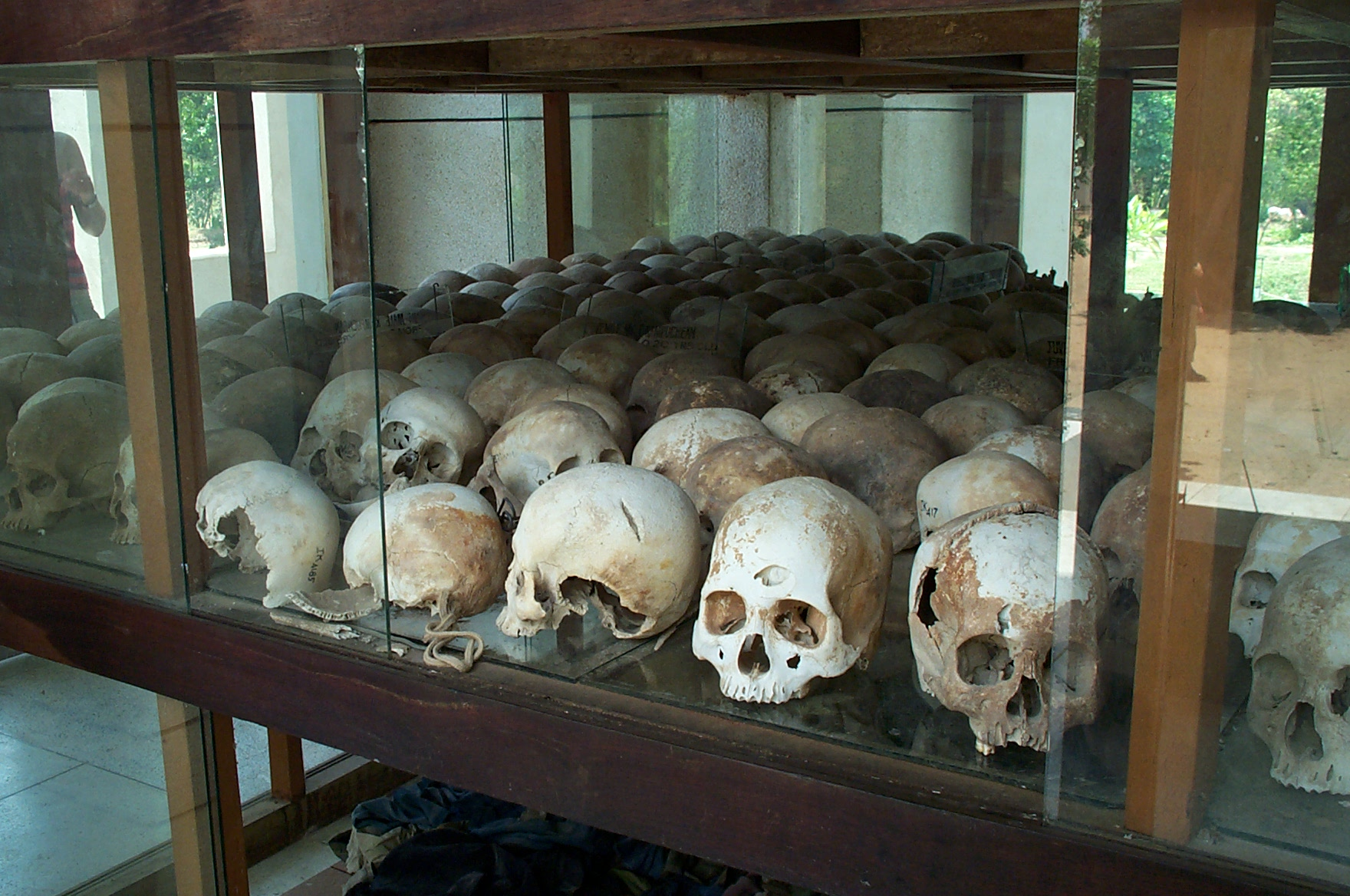
- Skulls at the Choeung Ek memorial in Cambodia
- Location: Democratic Kampuchea (present-day Cambodia)
- Date: 17 April 1975 – 7 January 1979 (3 years, 8 months and 20 days)
- Target: Cambodia's previous military and political leadership, middle-class professionals, businesspeople, intellectuals along with ethnic, linguistic, and religious minorities
- Attack type: Genocide, classicide, politicide, democide, ethnic cleansing, mass murder, cultural genocide, famine, forced labour, torture, mass rape, summary execution
- Deaths: 1.2–2.2 million (including 200,000–300,000 Chinese, 90,000–500,000 Cham 20,000 Vietnamese and 32,000 Thai)
- Perpetrators: Khmer Rouge, Kampuchea Revolutionary Army, Santebal, Communist Party of Kampuchea
- Motive: Establishment of an agrarian socialist society based on Maoist principles; Cultural reset (Year Zero); Khmer nationalism and cultural racism; Xenophobia; Anti-Vietnamese sentiment; Anti-Chinese sentiment; Anti-Western sentiment; Islamophobia; Anti-intellectualism; Anti-religious sentiment

The Cambodian genocide (Note: Khmer: ប្រល័យពូជសាសន៍នៅកម្ពុជា, lit. 'Genocide in Cambodia', or អំពើប្រល័យពូជសាសន៍ខ្មែរ, 'Khmer genocidal act(s)') was the systematic persecution and killing of Cambodian citizens, including ethnic minority populations, (Note: In 2010, the Extraordinary Chambers in the Courts of Cambodia ruled for the indictment of Nuon Chea and Khieu Samphan that both former Khmer Rouge officials are guilty of committing ethnic cleansing exclusively against ethnic Vietnamese and Chams.) by Cambodia's radical communist government known as the Khmer Rouge under the dictator Pol Pot. It resulted in the deaths of approximately 2 million people from 1975 to 1979, around 25% of Cambodia's population in 1975 (c. 7.8 million).

For many years, Cambodia's Khmer Rouge revolutionary movement of Pol Pot and his Communist Party of Kampuchea was supported by the Chinese Communist Party (CCP), led by Mao Zedong; (Note: See:) it is estimated that at least 90% of the foreign aid which the Khmer Rouge received came from China, including at least $1 billion worth in interest-free economic and military aid in 1975 alone. After it seized power in April 1975, the Khmer Rouge wanted to turn the country into an agrarian state founded on the policies of ultra-Maoism and influenced by the Cultural Revolution. (Note: See:) Pol Pot and other Khmer Rouge officials met with Mao in Beijing in June 1975, receiving approval and advice, while high-ranking CCP officials such as Politburo Standing Committee member Zhang Chunqiao later visited Cambodia to offer help. (Note: See:) To fulfill its goals, the Khmer Rouge emptied the cities and marched Cambodians to labor camps in the countryside, where mass executions, forced labor, physical abuse, torture, starvation, and disease were rampant. In 1976, the Khmer Rouge renamed the country Democratic Kampuchea.

The massacres ended when the Vietnamese military invaded in 1978 and toppled the Khmer Rouge regime. By January 1979, 1.5 to 2 million people, amounting to 20% to 25% of the country's 1975 population, had died due to the Khmer Rouge's policies, including 200,000–300,000 Chinese Cambodians, 90,000–500,000 (Note: Estimates vary according to scholars: * 90,000 deaths ~ 36% (Kiernan's 1982 estimate). * 500,000 to 560,000 deaths ~ 71,4% to 80% of total Cham population (DC-Cam and UN estimates).) Cambodian Cham (who are mostly Muslim), and 20,000 Vietnamese Cambodians. 20,000 people passed through the Security Prison 21, one of the 196 prisons the Khmer Rouge operated, and only seven adults survived. The prisoners were taken to the Killing Fields, where they were executed (often with pickaxes, to save bullets) and buried in mass graves. Abduction and indoctrination of children was widespread, and many were persuaded or forced to commit atrocities. As of 2009, the Documentation Center of Cambodia has mapped 23,745 mass graves containing approximately 1.3 million suspected victims of execution. Direct execution is believed to account for up to 60% of the genocide's death toll, with other victims succumbing to starvation, exhaustion, or disease.

The genocide triggered a second outflow of refugees, many of whom escaped to neighboring Thailand and, to a lesser extent, Vietnam. In 2003, by agreement between the Cambodian government and the United Nations, the Extraordinary Chambers in the Court of Cambodia (Khmer Rouge Tribunal) were established to try the members of the Khmer Rouge leadership responsible for the Cambodian genocide. Trials began in 2009. On 26 July 2010, the Trial Chamber convicted Kang Kek Iew for crimes against humanity and grave breaches of the 1949 Geneva Conventions. The Supreme Court Chamber increased his sentence to life imprisonment. Nuon Chea and Khieu Samphan were tried and convicted in 2014 of crimes against humanity and grave breaches of the Geneva Conventions. On 28 March 2019, the Trial Chamber found Nuon Chea and Khieu Samphan guilty of crimes against humanity, grave breaches of the Geneva Conventions, and genocide of the Vietnamese ethnic, national and racial group. The Chamber additionally convicted Nuon Chea of genocide of the Cham ethnic and religious group under the doctrine of superior responsibility. Both Nuon Chea and Khieu Samphan were sentenced to terms of life imprisonment.

== Historical background ==
=== Rise of the Khmer Rouge ===
==== Cambodian Civil War ====
In 1968, the Khmer Rouge officially launched a nationwide insurgency across Cambodia. Though the government of North Vietnam was not informed about the Khmer Rouge's decision in advance, its forces still provided shelter and weapons. This support made it difficult for the Cambodian military to effectively counter the insurgents, and for the next two years, King Norodom Sihanouk did very little to stop it. The insurgency thus grew in strength, resulting in the party openly declaring itself the Communist Party of Kampuchea (CPK).

Sihanouk was deposed in 1970 by Premier Lon Nol, with the support of the National Assembly, establishing the pro-United States Khmer Republic. On the Chinese Communist Party (CCP)'s advice, Sihanouk, who was in exile in Beijing, formed an alliance with the Khmer Rouge, and became the nominal head of a Khmer Rouge–dominated government-in-exile (known by its French acronym, GRUNK) backed by China. Although thoroughly aware of the weakness of Lon Nol's forces and loath to commit American military force to the new conflict in any form other than air power, the Nixon administration announced its support for the new Khmer Republic.

On 29 March 1970, North Vietnam launched an offensive against the Cambodian military. Documents from the Soviet Union's archives reveal that the invasion was launched at the Khmer Rouge's explicit request after negotiations were held with Nuon Chea. A North Vietnamese force quickly overran large parts of eastern Cambodia, coming within 15 miles (24 km) of the capital Phnom Penh before being pushed back. By June, three months after Sihanouk's removal, it had swept government forces from the entire northeastern third of the country. After defeating those forces, the Vietnamese turned the newly won territories over to the local insurgents. The Khmer Rouge also established "liberated" areas in the southern and southwestern parts of the country, where they operated independently of the Vietnamese.

After Sihanouk demonstrated his support for the Khmer Rouge by visiting them in the field, their ranks swelled from 6,000 to 50,000 fighters. Many of the new recruits were apolitical peasants who fought in support of the King, rather than for communism, of which they had little understanding.

By 1975, with Lon Nol's government running out of ammunition and other supplies due to its loss of U.S. support, it was clear that its collapse was imminent. On 17 April 1975, the Khmer Rouge captured Phnom Penh and ended the civil war. Mortality estimates for the Cambodian Civil War vary widely. Sihanouk used a figure of 600,000 civil war deaths, while Elizabeth Becker reported over a million civil war deaths, military and civilian included. Other researchers were unable to corroborate such high estimates. Marek Sliwinski notes that many estimates of the dead are open to question and may have been used for propaganda, suggesting that the true number lies between 240,000 and 310,000. Judith Banister and E. Paige Johnson described 275,000 war deaths as "the highest mortality that we can justify". Patrick Heuveline states that "Subsequent reevaluations of the demographic data situated the death toll for the [civil war] in the order of 300,000 or less."

==== United States bombing campaign ====
From 1970 to 1973, a massive United States bombing campaign against the Khmer Rouge devastated rural Cambodia. An earlier U.S. bombing campaign of Cambodia began on 18 March 1969 with Operation Menu, but U.S. bombing in Cambodia had commenced years before that.

The number of Cambodian civilian and Khmer Rouge deaths caused by U.S. bombing is disputed and difficult to disentangle from the broader Cambodian Civil War. Estimates range from 30,000 to 500,000. Sliwinski estimates that 17% of total civil war deaths can be attributed to U.S. bombing, noting that this is far behind the leading causes of death, as the U.S. bombing was concentrated in underpopulated border areas. Ben Kiernan attributes 50,000 to 150,000 deaths to the U.S. bombing.

The relationship between the United States' massive bombing of Cambodia and the growth of the Khmer Rouge in recruitment and popular support has been a matter of interest to historians. Some scholars, including Michael Ignatieff, Adam Jones, and Greg Grandin, have cited the United States intervention and bombing campaign from 1965 to 1973 as a significant factor in increasing the Cambodian peasantry's support for the Khmer Rouge. According to Ben Kiernan, the Khmer Rouge "would not have won power without U.S. economic and military destabilization of Cambodia. ... It used the bombing's devastation and massacre of civilians as recruitment propaganda and as an excuse for its brutal, radical policies and its purge of moderate communists and Sihanoukists."

Pol Pot biographer David P. Chandler writes that the bombing "had the effect the Americans wanted—it broke the Communist encirclement of Phnom Penh", but also accelerated the collapse of rural society and increased social polarization. Craig Etcheson agrees that U.S. intervention increased recruitment for the Khmer Rouge but disputes that it was a primary cause of the Khmer Rouge victory. According to William Shawcross, the United States bombing and ground incursion plunged Cambodia into the chaos that Sihanouk had worked to prevent the outbreak of for years.

=== International supporters of the Khmer Rouge ===
==== China ====
===== Mao era =====
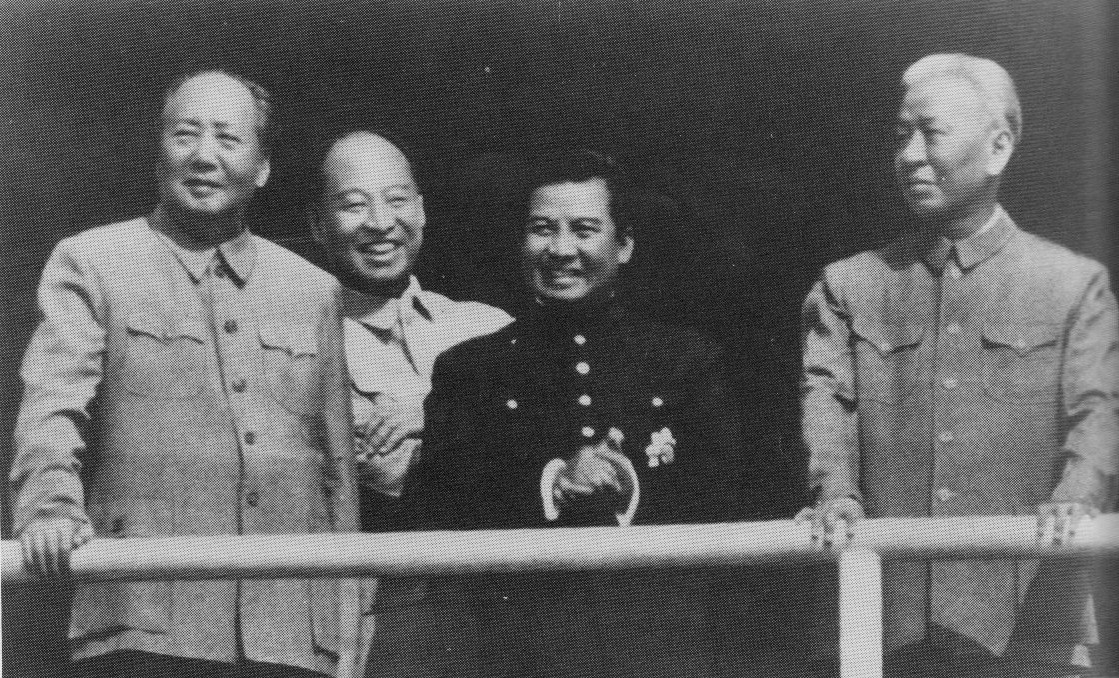
Mao Zedong, Peng Zhen, Norodom Sihanouk and Liu Shaoqi (1965)

Since the 1950s, Pol Pot (General Secretary of the Communist Party of Kampuchea from 1963 to 1981) had made frequent visits to the People's Republic of China, where he received political and military training—especially on the theory of the dictatorship of the proletariat—from the personnel of the CCP. From November 1965 to February 1966, high-ranking CCP officials such as Chen Boda and Zhang Chunqiao trained him on topics such as the communist revolution in China, class conflicts, Communist International, etc. Pol Pot also met with other officials, including Deng Xiaoping and Peng Zhen. He was particularly impressed by Kang Sheng's lecture on how to conduct a political purge.

In 1970, Lon Nol overthrew Sihanouk, who fled to Beijing, where Pol Pot was also visiting. On the CCP's advice, the Khmer Rouge changed its position, and to support Sihanouk, it established the National United Front of Kampuchea. In 1970 alone, the Chinese reportedly gave the United Front 400 tons of military aid. In April 1974, Sihanouk and Khmer Rouge leaders Ieng Sary and Khieu Samphan met with Mao in Beijing; Mao supported many of the policies the Khmer Rouge proposed but did not want it to marginalize Sihanouk after it won the civil war and established a new Cambodia.

In June 1975, Pol Pot and other Khmer Rouge officials met with Mao in Beijing, where Mao lectured Pol Pot on his "Theory of Continuing Revolution under the Dictatorship of the Proletariat (无产阶级专政下继续革命理论)", recommending two articles by Yao Wenyuan and sending Pol Pot over 30 books by Karl Marx, Friedrich Engels, Vladimir Lenin, and Joseph Stalin. During this meeting, Mao told Pol Pot:

We agree with you! Much of your experience is better than ours. China is not qualified to criticize you. We committed errors of the political routes for ten times in fifty years—some are national, some are local…Thus I say China has no qualification to criticize you but to applaud you. You are basically correct…During the transition from the democratic revolution to adopting a socialist path, there exist two possibilities: one is socialism, the other is capitalism. Our situation now is like this. Fifty years from now, or one hundred years from now, the struggle between two lines will exist. Even ten thousand years from now, the struggle between two lines will still exist. When Communism is realized, the struggle between two lines will still be there. Otherwise, you are not a Marxist. This is unity existing among opposites. If one mentions only one side of the two, this is metaphysics. I believe in what Marx and Lenin have said, that the path [of advance] would be tortuous ... Our state now is, as Lenin said, a capitalist state without capitalists. This state protects capitalist rights, and the wages are not equal. Under the slogan of equality, a system of inequality has been introduced. There will exist a struggle between two lines, the struggle between the advanced and the backward, even when Communism is realized. Today we cannot explain it completely.

Pol Pot replied: "The issue of lines of struggle raised by Chairman Mao is an important strategic issue. We will follow your words in the future. I have read and learned various works of Chairman Mao since I was young, especially the theory on people's war. Your works have guided our entire party." On the other hand, during an August 1975 meeting, Chinese Premier Zhou Enlai warned Sihanouk as well as Khmer Rouge leaders including Khieu Samphan and Ieng Sary of the danger of radical movement toward communism, citing the mistakes in China's Great Leap Forward. Zhou urged them not to repeat the mistakes that had caused havoc. Sihanouk later recalled that Khieu Samphan and Ieng Thirith responded only with "an incredulous and superior smile".

During the genocide, China was the Khmer Rouge's largest military and economic supporter, supplying "more than 15,000 military advisers" and most of its external aid. It is estimated that at least 90% of foreign aid to Khmer Rouge came from China, with 1975 alone seeing US$1 billion in interest-free economic and military aid, "the biggest aid ever given to any one country by China". A series of internal crises in 1976 prevented Beijing from exerting substantial influence over Khmer Rouge policies.

===== Transition period =====
After Mao's death in September 1976, China underwent a two-year transitionary period that ended with the appointment of Deng Xiaoping as its new paramount leader in December 1978. During the transition period, Pol Pot made an official visit to China in July 1977 and was welcomed by CCP chairman Hua Guofeng and other high-ranking CCP officials, with the People's Daily calling him the "Comrade from Cambodia" (柬埔寨战友). Pol Pot also toured the agricultural production model of Dazhai, a product of Mao's era. Chen Yonggui, Vice Premier of China and the leader of Dazhai, visited Cambodia in December 1977, commending the achievement of its movement toward communism.

In 1978, Son Sen, a Khmer Rouge leader and the Minister of National Defense of Democratic Kampuchea, visited China and obtained its approval for military aid. In the same year, high-ranking CCP officials such as Wang Dongxing and Deng Yingchao visited Cambodia to offer support.

===== Deng era =====
Soon after Deng became the paramount leader of China, the Vietnamese invaded Cambodia and ended the genocide by defeating the Khmer Rouge in January 1979. The People's Republic of Kampuchea was then established. To counter the power of the Soviet Union and Vietnam in Southeast Asia, China officially condemned the Vietnamese invasion and continued its material support of the Khmer Rouge. In early 1979, China launched an invasion of Vietnam to retaliate against Vietnam's invasion of Cambodia. Deng informed U.S. President Jimmy Carter about the attack on Vietnam beforehand, during his visit to the United States soon after the People's Republic of China and the United States established formal diplomatic relations on January 1, 1979. Carter attempted to dissuade Deng from pursuing the military action, but did not succeed.

Deng was convinced by a conversation with Singapore's prime minister Lee Kuan Yew to limit the scale and duration of the war. After the one-month war, Singapore attempted to serve as a mediator between Vietnam and China on the Cambodian issue.

==== Other supporters ====
As a result of Chinese and Western opposition to the Vietnamese invasion of 1978 and 1979, the Khmer Rouge continued to hold Cambodia's United Nations (UN) seat until 1982, after which the seat was filled by a Khmer Rouge-dominated coalition known as the Coalition Government of Democratic Kampuchea (CGDK). Owing to support from China, Thailand, other Southeast Asian countries, the U.S., and some Western countries, the CGDK held Cambodia's UN seat until 1993, long after the Cold War ended.

China trained Khmer Rouge soldiers on its soil from 1979 to at least 1986, "stationed military advisers with Khmer Rouge troops as late as 1990", and "supplied at least $1 billion in military aid" during the 1980s. There are allegations of United States support for the Khmer Rouge because it wished to weaken Vietnam's influence in Southeast Asia. The UK has also been accused of helping the group as the Special Air Service trained non-Khmer Rouge soldiers of the CGDK coalition from 1985 to 1989 in Thailand. After the 1991 Paris Peace Accords, Thailand continued to allow the Khmer Rouge "to trade and move across the Thai border to sustain their activities ... although international criticism, particularly from the United States and Australia ... caused it to disavow passing any direct military support."

== Ideology ==
Ideology played an important role in the genocide. Pol Pot was influenced by Marxism–Leninism and he wanted to transform Cambodia into an entirely self-sufficient agrarian socialist society that would be free from foreign influences. Stalin's works have been described as a "crucial formative influence" on his thought. Mao's works were also heavily influential, particularly influential was Mao's booklet which was titled On New Democracy. Jean-Jacques Rousseau was one of Pol Pot's favorite authors, according to historian David Chandler. In the mid-1960s, Pol Pot reformulated his ideas about Marxism–Leninism to suit the Cambodian situation by advocating goals such as bringing Cambodia back to an alleged and mythical past of the powerful Khmer Empire, eradicating influences which he viewed as "corrupting", such as foreign aid and Western culture, as well as restoring Cambodia's agrarian society.

Pol Pot's strong belief that Cambodia needed to be transformed into an agrarian utopia stemmed from his experience in Cambodia's rural northeast—where he developed an affinity for the agrarian self-sufficiency of the area's isolated tribes—while the Khmer Rouge gained power. Attempts to implement these goals (formed upon the observations of small, rural communes) into a larger society were key factors in the ensuing genocide. One Khmer Rouge leader said that the killings were meant for the "purification of the populace." The Khmer Rouge forced virtually the entire population of Cambodia to divide itself into mobile work teams. Michael Hunt has written that it was "an experiment in social mobilization unmatched in twentieth-century revolutions." The Khmer Rouge used a forced labor regime, starvation, forced resettlement, land collectivization, and state terror to keep the population in line. The Khmer Rouge's economic plan was named the "Maha Lout Ploh", a direct allusion to the "Great Leap Forward" in China that caused tens of millions of deaths in the Great Chinese Famine.

Kenneth M. Quinn is the author of a doctoral dissertation (in 1974) about the "origins of the radical Pol Pot regime" is "widely acknowledged as the first person to report on the genocidal policies of Pol Pot and the Khmer Rouge." While he was employed as a Foreign Service Officer for the U.S. State Department in Southeast Asia, Quinn was stationed on the South Vietnamese border for nine months between 1973 and 1974. While he was stationed there, Quinn "interviewed countless Cambodian refugees who had escaped from the brutal clutches of the Khmer Rouge." Based upon the interviews which he compiled and the atrocities which he witnessed firsthand, Quinn wrote "a 40-page report about it, which was submitted throughout the U.S. government." In the report, he wrote that the Khmer Rouge had "much in common with those of totalitarian regimes in Nazi Germany and the Soviet Union." Quinn has written of the Khmer Rouge that "[w]hat emerges as the explanation for the terror and violence that swept Cambodia during the 1970s is that a small group of alienated intellectuals, enraged by their perception of a corrupt society and imbued with a Maoist plan to create a pure socialist order in the shortest possible time, recruited extremely young, poor, and envious cadres, instructed them in harsh and brutal methods learned from Stalinist mentors, and used them to destroy physically the cultural underpinnings of the Khmer civilization and to impose a new society through purges, executions, and violence."

Ben Kiernan has compared the Cambodian genocide to the Armenian genocide, which was perpetrated by the Ottoman Empire during World War I, and the Holocaust, perpetrated by Nazi Germany during World War II. While each genocide was unique, certain features were common in all three of them, and racism was a major part of the ideology of their respective regimes. All three regimes targeted religious minorities, they tried to use force in order to expand their rule into what they believed were their historic heartlands (the Khmer Empire, the Eastern Anatolia region, and Lebensraum, respectively), and they "idealized their ethnic peasantry as the true 'national' class, the ethnic soil from which the new state grew."

== Killings ==
=== Androcide ===
Analysis of existing mortality estimates show that men accounted for 81% of all violent deaths and 67% of all excess deaths in this period. The killing of about 50–70% of Cambodia's working-age men led to a shift in norms regarding the sexual division of labor and correlates with present-day indicators of women's economic advancements and increased representation in local-level elected office.

=== Classicide ===
The Khmer Rouge regime frequently arrested and executed anyone whom it suspected of having connections with the former Cambodian government along with anyone whom it suspected of having connections with foreign governments, as well as professionals, intellectuals, the Buddhist monkhood, and ethnic minorities. Even those people who were stereotypically thought of as having intellectual qualities, such as wearing glasses or speaking multiple languages, were executed out of fear that they would rebel against the Khmer Rouge. The British sociologist Martin Shaw described the Cambodian genocide as "the purest genocide of the Cold War era". The attempt to purify Cambodian society along racial, social and political lines led to murderous purges of Cambodia's previous military and political leadership, along with business leaders, journalists, students, doctors, and lawyers. Due to the fact that the perpetrators and the victims of the mass murder were largely members of the same ethnic group, the term autogenocide was coined to describe the unique character of the genocide. According to Samuel Totten, 25% of the urban Khmer population or 500,000 people perished under the rule of the Khmer Rouge, along with 16% of the rural Khmer population or 825,000 people putting the killing at a scale comparable to the Nazi genocide of the Roma (25% of the Roma population of Europe, or 130,000 to 500,000 people) and the genocide of Serbians (300,000 to 500,000 people) during World War II.

=== Genocide ===
Ethnic Vietnamese, ethnic Thai, ethnic Chinese, ethnic Cham, Cambodian Christians, and other minorities were also targeted for persecution. The Khmer Rouge forcibly relocated minority groups and banned their languages. By decree, the Khmer Rouge banned the existence of more than 20 minority groups, which constituted 15% of Cambodia's population. While Cambodians in general were victims of the Khmer Rouge regime, the persecution, torture, and killings committed by the Khmer Rouge are considered an act of genocide according to the United Nations as ethnic and religious minorities were systematically targeted by Pol Pot and his regime.

Scholars and historians have varying opinions on whether the persecution and killings which occurred during the rule of the Khmer Rouge should be considered genocide. These conflicting opinions exist because scholars who conducted research in Cambodia immediately after the fall of the Khmer Rouge regime in 1979 claimed that the victims could have been killed due to the circumstances which they were living under. For instance, Michael Vickery opined that the killings were "largely the result of the spontaneous excesses of a vengeful, undisciplined peasant army."

This point of view was also supported by Alexander Hinton, who cited an account by a former Khmer Rouge cadre who claimed that the killings were acts of retribution for the atrocities which were perpetrated by Lon Nol's soldiers when they killed people who were known to be former Viet Minh agents before Pol Pot and the Khmer Rouge's rise to power. Vickery—erroneously, as has been proven by the research which was more recently conducted by Ben Kiernan—argued that the number of Cham victims who were killed during the Khmer Rouge's rule of Cambodia was around 20,000 which would still be a substantial part of the Cham group and would thus constitute the crime of genocide by Pol Pot and the Khmer Rouge. The killings were a centralized and bureaucratic effort which was undertaken by the Khmer Rouge regime, according to documents which were recently published by the Documentation Center of Cambodia (DC-Cam) as a result of the discovery of Khmer Rouge internal security documents which instructed the killings across Cambodia. However there were also instances of "indiscipline and spontaneity in the mass killings." On top of that, Etcheson has also proven that as a result of the systematic and mass killings which were based on political affiliations, ethnicity, religion, and citizenship, a third of Cambodia's population perished, so the Khmer Rouge is effectively guilty of committing genocide.

David Chandler has argued that, even though ethnic minorities fell victim to the Khmer Rouge regime, they were not specifically targeted by it because of their ethnic backgrounds, instead, they were targeted because they were considered enemies of the regime. Chandler also rejects the use of the terms "chauvinism" and "genocide" just to avoid drawing possible parallels to Hitler. This indicates that Chandler does not believe in the argument of charging the Khmer Rouge regime with the crime of genocide. Similarly, Michael Vickery holds a similar position to Chandler's, and does not classify the atrocities of the Khmer Rouge regime as genocide; Vickery regarded the Khmer Rouge a "chauvinist" regime, due to its anti-Vietnam and anti-religion policies. Stephen Heder also believed that the Khmer Rouge were not guilty of genocide, stating that the atrocities of the regime were not motivated by racism.

Kiernan makes the argument that it was indeed a genocide and he disagrees with these three scholars, by bringing forth examples from the history of the Cham people in Cambodia, as did an international tribunal finding Nuon Chea and Khieu Samphan guilty of 92 and 87 counts of said crime respectively. Genocide scholar Gregory Stanton concluded that the mass killings and starvation by the Khmer Rouge did constitute genocide, both as defined in the Genocide Convention and in the broader definition of Raphael Lemkin, which includes destruction of political, social, and economic groups. The crimes were genocide under the Genocide Convention because they included the intentional destruction of a significant part of two ethnic groups, the Vietnamese and the Cham.

==== Vietnamese ====
The Khmer Rouge officially blamed minority groups, particularly the Cham and the Vietnamese, for the country's ills. The regime initially ordered the expulsion of ethnic Vietnamese from Cambodia but then conducted large scale massacres of large numbers of Vietnamese civilians who were being deported out of Cambodia. The regime then prevented the remaining 20,000 ethnic Vietnamese from fleeing, and much of this group was also executed. The Khmer Rouge also used the media to support their goals of genocide. Radio Phnom Penh called on Cambodians to "exterminate the 50 million Vietnamese."

Additionally, the Khmer Rouge conducted many cross-border raids into Vietnam, where they slaughtered an estimated 30,000 Vietnamese civilians. Most notably, during the Ba Chúc massacre in April 1978, the Khmer Rouge military crossed the border and entered the village, slaughtering 3,157 Vietnamese civilians. This caused an urgent response from the Vietnamese government, precipitating the Cambodian–Vietnamese War in which the Khmer Rouge was defeated.

==== Chinese ====
The state of the Chinese Cambodians during the rule of the Khmer Rouge regime was alleged to be "the worst disaster ever to befall any ethnic Chinese community in Southeast Asia." Cambodians of Chinese descent were massacred by the Khmer Rouge under the justification that they "used to exploit the Cambodian people". The Chinese were stereotyped as traders and moneylenders associated with capitalism, while historically the group attracted resentment due to their lighter skin color and cultural differences. Hundreds of Cham, Chinese, and Khmer families were rounded up in 1978 and told that they were to be resettled, but were actually executed.

At the beginning of the rule of the Khmer Rouge regime in 1975, there were 425,000 ethnic Chinese in Cambodia. By the end of 1979, there were just 200,000, most of them were stuck in Thai refugee camps and the rest of them remaining in Cambodia. 170,000 Chinese fled from Cambodia and moved to Vietnam, and others were repatriated.

The Chinese were predominantly city-dwellers, making them vulnerable to the Khmer Rouge's revolutionary ruralism and its evacuation of city residents to farms. The government of the People's Republic of China did not protest against the killings of ethnic Chinese in Cambodia, despite its awareness of the atrocities and its simultaneous condemnation of the Vietnamese government's mistreatment of ethnic Chinese who lived in Vietnam.

==== Cham Muslims ====
According to Ben Kiernan, the "fiercest extermination campaign was directed against the ethnic Chams, Cambodia's Muslim minority." Islam was seen as an "alien" and "foreign" culture that did not belong in the new Communist system. Initially, the Khmer Rouge aimed for the "forced assimilation" of Chams through population dispersal. Pol Pot then began using intimidation efforts against the Chams that included the assassination of village elders, but he ultimately ordered the full-scale mass killing of the Cham people.

American professor Samuel Totten and Australian professor Paul R. Bartrop estimate that these efforts would have completely wiped out the Cham population were it not for the overthrow of the Khmer Rouge in early 1979. In a Khmer Rouge official meeting took place in Sector 41, Kampong Cham province in 1977, a plan was proclaimed up to "smash enemies of the revolution", stating that "the enemies of the revolution are many, but our biggest enemy are Cham. So the Plan calls for the destruction of all the Cham people before 1980." More telegrams were sent from Pol Pot to local governments between 1978 and 1979 than usual and hastily ordered that the total eradication of the Cham must be achieved before 1980.

The Cham began to rise in prominence when they joined the communists as early as the 1950s, with a Cham elder, Sos Man joining the Indochina Communist Party and rising through the ranks to become a major in the Party's forces. He then returned home to the Eastern Zone in 1970 and joined the Communist Party of Kampuchea, and he co-established the Eastern Zone Islamic Movement with his son, Mat Ly. Together, they became the mouthpiece of the Khmer Rouge and they encouraged the Cham people to participate in the revolution. Sos Man's Islamic Movement was also tolerated by the Khmer Rouge's leadership between 1970 and 1975. The Chams were gradually forced to abandon their faith and their distinct practices, a campaign which was launched in the Southwest as early as 1972.

Ten Cham villages were taken over by the Khmer Rouge in 1972–1973, where new Cham leaders were installed, and they forced the villagers to work in the fields which were located away from their hometowns. A witness who was interviewed by Kiernan asserts that at that time, they were well-treated by the Khmer Rouge, and in 1974, they were allowed to return to their homes. Moreover, the Cham were classified as "depositee base people", making them vulnerable to persecution. Despite their plight, the Cham and the locals live side by side in many areas, speaking the Khmer language, and even inter-marrying with the majority Khmers as well as with the minority Chinese and Vietnamese. The diverse ethnic and cultural practices of Cambodians began to deteriorate during the rise of the Khmer Rouge in 1972, when the Cham were prohibited from practising their faith and culture: Cham women were required to keep their hair short like the Khmers; Cham men were not allowed to wear the sarong; farmers were forced to wear rudimentary dark or black clothing; religious activities like the recitation of the mandatory daily prayers were forbidden. Vickery notes that the Cambodian Cham were discriminated against by the Khmer before the beginning of the war "in some localities", partly because the Cham were stereotyped as being practitioners of black magic. In other localities, the Cham were well-assimilated within the host communities, speaking the Khmer language and marrying Khmers, Vietnamese, and Chinese.

Between 1972 and 1974, the Khmer Rouge intensified the enforcement of the restrictions which they imposed on the Cham because they believed that the Cham were a threat to their communist agenda due to the existence of their unique language, their culture, their beliefs, and their independent communal system. Additionally, the Cham were renamed "Islamic Khmers" in an attempt to disassociate them from their ancestral heritage and ethnicity and force them to assimilate into the larger and Khmer-dominated Democratic Kampuchea. The Khmer Rouge believed that the Cham would jeopardize their attempts to establish close-knit communities where everyone could be easily monitored. As a result, the regime decided to disperse the Cham by deporting them from their respective localities and forcing them to work as peasants across Cambodia, hence forcing them to directly contribute to the creation and maintenance of the new Cambodian economy. This move was undertaken in an attempt to ensure that the Cham would not congregate in an attempt to form their own community again, which would have undermined the regime's plan to establish centralized economic cooperatives. Slowly, those Cham who defied the restrictions which the Khmer Rouge imposed on them were arrested by the regime. Hence, in October 1973, Cham Muslims in the Eastern Zone demonstrated their displeasure with the Khmer Rouge's restrictions by beating their drums y local mosques. This act of communal defiance prompted the blanket arrest of many Cham Muslim leaders and religious teachers. In February 1974, the Cham who lived in Region 31, which was located in the Western Zone, protested against the Khmer Rouge's fishing policies were massacred by gunfire. By December 1974, a rebellion by the Cham in Region 21 of the Eastern Zone had broken out against the Khmer Rouge after community leaders were arrested. The rebellion was forcefully repressed by the regime and no records of casualties were documented.

As much as there are records of these restrictions, resistance, and repressions, there are also accounts by members of the Cham community which deny the oppression which it was subjected to by the regime between 1970 and early 1975. While restrictions on certain activities like trade and travel were imposed during that period, they were understood to be the by-products of the ongoing civil war. Moreover, some Cham had also joined the revolution as soldiers and members of the Khmer Rouge. According to some local accounts, people had confidence in the Khmer Rouge when they first came to the village communities which assisted the locals by providing food and provisions to them, and there were no bans on local cultures or religions; even if restrictions were imposed, the consequences of them were not harsh. Many regarded the Khmer Rouge as heroes because they believed that the Khmer Rouge supported the peasantry during its war against the United States backed government. Because the Cham communities could be found across Cambodia, various Cham communities might have experienced the effects of the Khmer Rouge's pre-1975 rule differently; some communities experienced the repressions and restrictions but other communities did not. When Pol Pot consolidated his power by the end of 1975, the persecution became more severe, and it indiscriminately affected all of the Cham people. This could well be one of the simpler reasons as to why the Cambodian government and the Extraordinary Chambers in the Courts of Cambodia (ECCC) have not prosecuted any Khmer Rouge members who perpetrated atrocities during the pre-1975 period, the period before Pol Pot consolidated his power. As a result, the accounts of those Cham who experienced the repressions prior to 1975 were not considered parts of the genocide, mainly because according to the Article 1 of the Law on the Establishment of the Extraordinary Chambers, jurisdiction ratione temporis is limited to the period from 17 April 1975 to 6 January 1979.

In 1975, upon the victory of the Khmer Rouge over the Khmer Republic's forces, two brothers of Cham descent who had joined the Khmer Rouge as soldiers returned home to Region 21 within the Kampong Cham Province, where the largest Cham Muslim community could be found. The brothers told their father about the adventures which they had experienced as participants in the revolution, which included the killing of Khmers and the consumption of pork, in the hope that they would be able to convince their father to join the communist cause. The father, who remained silent, grabbed a cleaver, killed his sons, and told his fellow villagers that he killed the enemy. When the villagers pointed out that he murdered his own sons, he recounted the stories which his sons had previously told to him, citing the Khmer Rouge's hatred for Islam and the Cham people. This event prompted the villagers to make a unanimous agreement, that night, they would kill all Khmer Rouge soldiers who were stationed in the area. The next morning, more Khmer Rouge soldiers descended upon the area with heavy weapons, and they surrounded the village, killing every single villager in it. Similarly, in June or July 1975, the Khmer Rouge authorities in Region 21 of the Eastern Zone tried to confiscate all copies of the Qur'an from the people, and at the same time, they tried to impose a mandatory short haircut on Cham women. The authorities encountered a mass demonstration which was staged by members of the local Cham community who were shot at by the regime's soldiers. The Cham forcefully retaliated with swords and blades, killing a few soldiers, only to be retaliated against by the regime's military reinforcements, which annihilated the villagers and their property. In another account which was given by Cham refugees in Malaysia, 13 leading figures within the Cham Muslim community were killed by the regime in June 1975. The supposed reason for the killings was because some of them were "leading prayers instead of attending a CPK meeting", while the others were purportedly "petitioning for the permission on marriage ceremonies."

The events went from bad to worse in mid-1976 due to the rebellion, when the ethnic minorities were only allowed to pledge allegiance to the Khmer nationality and religion: there were to be no other identities besides the Khmer identity. Consequently, the Cham language was not spoken, communal eating in which everyone eats the same food became mandatory, forcing Cham Muslims to violate their religious beliefs by raising pigs and consuming pork. One reason for the occurrence of such rebellions which has been offered by locals is the fact that some of the Cham who were involved in the Khmer Rouge as soldiers were anticipating the acquisition of positions of power once Pol Pot consolidated his power. In 1975, these soldiers were dismissed from the Khmer Rouge's forces, deprived of their Islamic practices and robbed of their ethnic identity.

The patterns were consistent throughout the killings of the Cham people: first, the communal structures were dismantled as a result of the murder of Cham Muslim leaders, including muftis, imams, and other learned men of influence. Second, the Cham's Islamic and ethnic identities were both dismantled when the practices that distinguished the Cham from the Khmers were restricted. Third, the Cham were dispersed from their communities, they were either forced to perform labour in the fields or they were accused of plotting to incite acts of resistance or rebellions against the Khmer Rouge and arrested. During the Khmer Rouge's rule of Cambodia, all religions, including Buddhism, Christianity, and Islam, were banned and adherents of them were persecuted. According to Cham sources, 132 mosques were destroyed during the Khmer Rouge's rule, many other mosques were desecrated, and Muslims were not allowed to practice their faith. Muslims were forced to eat pork and they were murdered when they refused to eat it. Whole Cham villages were exterminated. Chams were not permitted to speak their language. Cham children were separated from their parents and raised as Khmers. Orders which were given by the Khmer Rouge government in 1979 stated: "The Cham nation no longer exists on Kampuchean soil belonging to the Khmer. Accordingly, Cham nationality, language, customs and religious beliefs must be immediately abolished. Those who fail to obey this order will suffer all the consequences for their acts of opposition to Angkar."

After the end of the Khmer Rouge's rule, all religions were restored. Vickery believes that about 185,000 Cham lived in Cambodia in the mid-1980s and he also believes that the number of mosques was about the same then as it was before 1975. In early 1988, there were six mosques in the Phnom Penh area and a "good number" of mosques also existed in the provinces, but Muslim dignitaries were thinly stretched; only 20 of the previous 113 most prominent Cham clergy in Cambodia survived the rule of the Khmer Rouge period.

According to Ben Kiernan, the racialization of the Cham during the colonial and post-colonial eras could be the main reason behind the Khmer Rouge's hatred of the Cham people. Misinformation and racial stereotypes were used to disconnect the Cham from their ancestral homelands, including the Cham extinction theory that was proposed by colonial scholars, according to that theory, the "real" Cham were extinct. Kiernan writes: "In the twentieth century, Chams have suffered from two myths: the glory of their "empire" has been exaggerated, and so has their present plight. A romanticized view of Cham doom helped deprive them of rights in 1975–79. They were called "Malays" by the French, and after Cambodia's independence, received a new, equally inaccurate label: "Islamic Khmers." Again their ethnic origin was denied, in the perverse sense, Chams became victims of History." Scholars also compare the denial of the Khmer Rouge's racist motivation for its genocide against the Cham to the denial of the Holocaust, both forms of genocide denial are analogous narrational canards that seek to use victims' religions to justify the actions of genocide perpetrators but they ignore wider race and ethnic hatreds and discriminatory backgrounds.

=== Religious groups ===
Under the leadership of Pol Pot, who was an ardent Marxist atheist, the Khmer Rouge enforced a policy of state atheism. According to Catherine Wessinger, "Democratic Kampuchea was officially an atheist state, and the persecution of religion by the Khmer Rouge was only matched in severity by the persecution of religion in the communist states of Albania (see religion in communist Albania) and North Korea (see freedom of religion in North Korea)." All religions were banned, and the repression of adherents of Islam, Christianity, and Buddhism was extensive. It is estimated that up to 50,000 Buddhist monks were massacred by the Khmer Rouge.

=== Internal purges ===
In 1978, in order to purge the Eastern Military Zone of those he perceived to have been contaminated by the Vietnamese, Pol Pot ordered military units from the Southwest Zone to move into eastern Kampuchea and eliminate the "hidden traitors". Unable to withstand an attack from the Kampuchea Government, So Phim committed suicide while his deputy Heng Samrin defected to Vietnam. The series of massacres in the Eastern Zone were the most serious of all of the massacres which took place during the Pol Pot regime's genocide.

== Use of children ==
The Khmer Rouge exploited thousands of desensitized, conscripted children in their early teens to commit mass murder and other atrocities during and after the genocide. The indoctrinated children were taught to follow any order without hesitation.

The organization continued to use children extensively until at least 1998, often forcibly recruiting them. During this period, the children were deployed mainly in unpaid support roles, such as ammunition-carriers, and also as combatants. Many children had fled the Khmer Rouge without a means to feed themselves and believed that joining the government forces would enable them to survive, although local commanders frequently denied them any pay.

== Torture and human experimentation ==
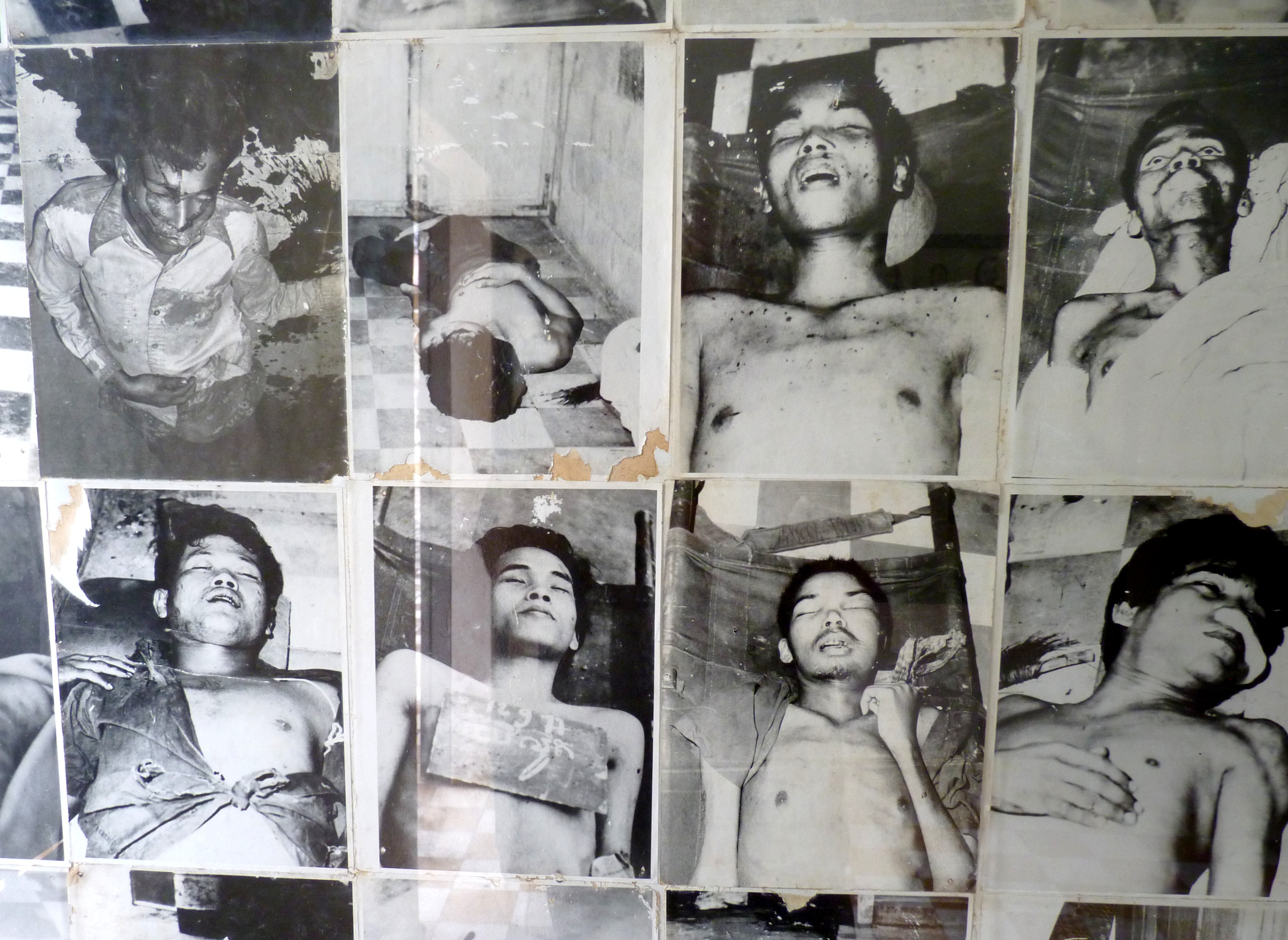
Khmer Rouge security forces photos of torture victims at the Tuol Sleng genocide museum

The Khmer Rouge regime is also well known for practicing torturous medical experiments on prisoners. People were imprisoned and tortured merely on suspicion of opposing the regime or because other prisoners gave their names under torture. Whole families ended up in prisons and were tortured because the Khmer Rouge feared that if they did not do this, their intended victims' relatives would seek revenge. Pol Pot said, "if you want to kill the grass, you also have to kill the roots". Most prisoners did not even know why they were imprisoned and, if they dared to ask the prison guards, the guards would answer only by saying that Angkar (the Communist Party of Kampuchea) never makes mistakes, which meant that they must have done something illegal.

There are many accounts of torture in both the Security Prison 21 records and the documents of the trial; as told by the survivor Bou Meng in his book (written by Huy Vannak), tortures were so atrocious and heinous that the prisoners tried in every way to commit suicide, even using spoons, and their hands were constantly tied behind their back to prevent them from committing suicide or trying to escape. When it was believed that they could not provide any further useful information, they were blindfolded and sent to the Killing Fields, which were mass graves where prisoners were killed at night with metal tools such as scythes, nails, or hammers (since bullets were too expensive). Oftentimes, their screams were covered with loudspeakers playing propaganda music of Democratic Kampuchea and noise from generator sets.

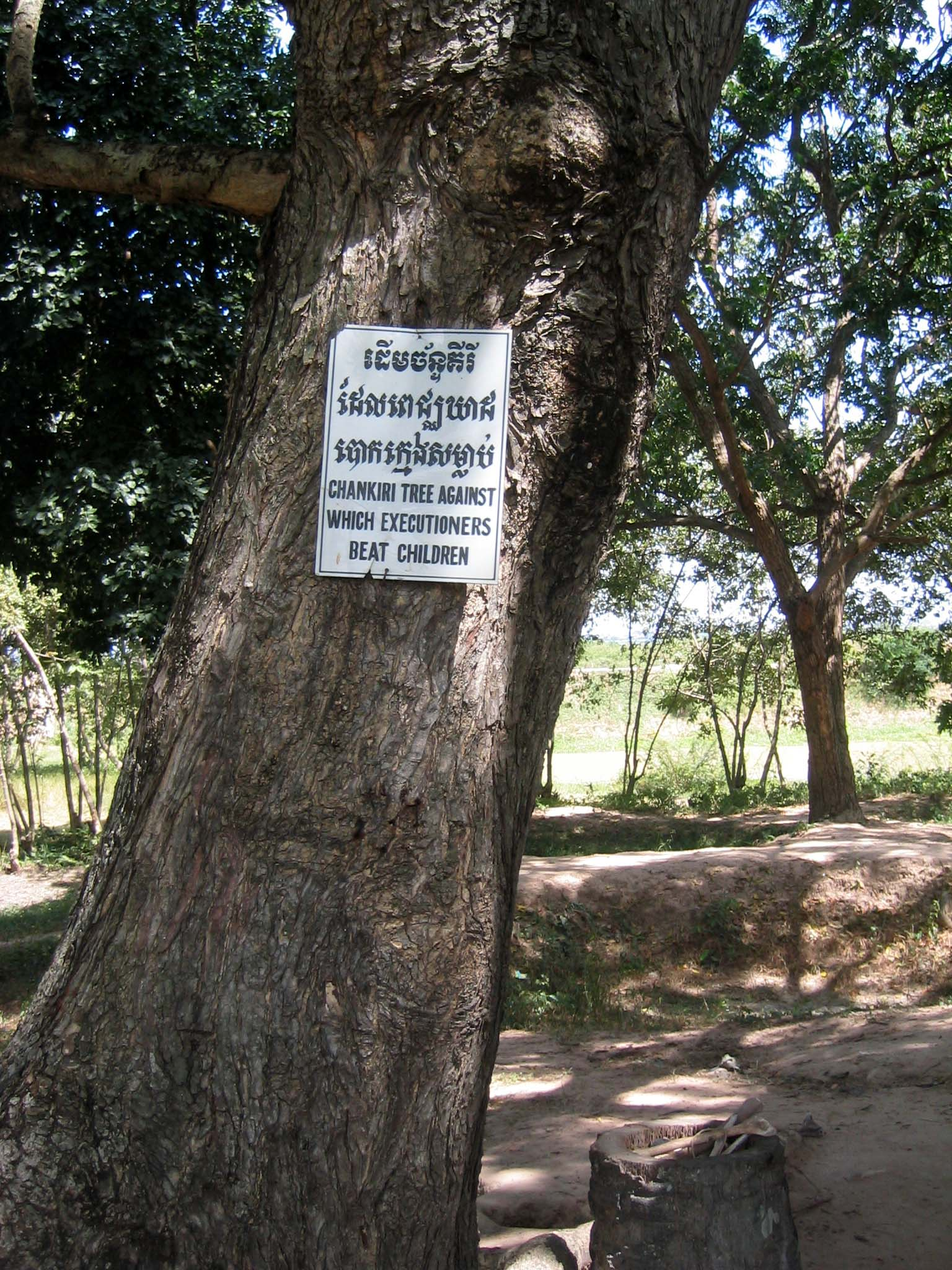
A Chankiri Tree. The sign reads "Chankiri Tree against which executioners beat children. "

Inside S-21, a special treatment was given to babies and children; they were taken away from their mothers and relatives, and sent to the Killing Fields, where they were smashed against the so-called Chankiri Tree. A similar treatment is supposed to have been given to babies of other prisons like S-21, spread all over Democratic Kampuchea. S-21 also incarcerated a few Westerners who were captured by the regime. One was the British teacher John Dawson Dewhirst, captured by the Khmer Rouge while he was on a yacht. One guard of S-21, Cheam Soeu, said that one of the Westerners had been burned alive, but Kang Kek Iew ("Comrade Duch") denied that. He said that Pol Pot asked him to burn their corpses (after death) and that "nobody would dare to violate my order". Tortures were meant not only to force prisoners to confess but for the prison guards' amusement. They feared that they would themselves become prisoners if they treated the prisoners well.

The previous doctors were killed or sent to the countryside to work as farmers during the Khmer Rouge and the library of the Medical Faculty in Phnom Penh was set on fire. The regime then employed child medics, who were just teenagers with no or very little training. They did not have any knowledge of Western medicine (which was forbidden since it was considered a capitalist invention), and they had to practice their own medical experiments and make progress by themselves. They did not have Western medicines (since Cambodia, according to the Khmer Rouge, had to be self-sufficient) and all medical experiments were systematically conducted without proper anesthetics. A medic who worked inside S-21 said that a 17-year-old girl had her throat slit and her abdomen pierced before being beaten and put into water for an entire night. This procedure was repeated many times and carried out without anesthetics.

In a hospital of Kampong Cham province, child medics cut out the intestines of a living non-consenting person and joined their ends to study the healing process. The patient died after three days due to the "operation". In the same hospital, other "physicians" trained by the Khmer Rouge opened the chest of a living person, just to see the heart beating. The operation resulted in the patient's immediate death. Other testimonies, as well as Khmer Rouge policy, suggest that these were not isolated cases. They also performed drug testing, for instance by injecting coconut juice into a living person's body and studying the effects. Coconut juice injection is often lethal. Witness at Tribunal hearing also disclosed that in Tbong Khmum province, he saw a medical staff at the hospital carrying out experiments on the wives of arrested cadre at night, when it was quiet. The victims' bodies were cut open and injected with some liquid that other reports stated that the injection could be some form of coconut fluid.

== Number of deaths ==
Impact of the genocide on the country's average life expectancy

Ben Kiernan estimates that between 1.671 million and 1.871 million Cambodians died as a result of Khmer Rouge policy, or between 21% and 24% of Cambodia's 1975 population. A study by demographer Marek Sliwinski calculated slightly fewer than 2 million unnatural deaths under the Khmer Rouge out of a 1975 Cambodian population of 7.8 million; 33.5% of Cambodian men died under the Khmer Rouge compared to 15.7% of Cambodian women.

According to a 2001 academic source, the most widely accepted estimates of excess deaths under the Khmer Rouge range from 1.5 million to 2 million, although figures as low as 1 million and as high as 3 million have been cited; conventionally accepted estimates of deaths due to Khmer Rouge executions range from 500,000 to 1 million, "a third to one half of excess mortality during the period." However, a 2013 academic source (citing research from 2009) indicates that execution may have accounted for as much as 60% of the total, with 23,745 mass graves containing approximately 1.3 million suspected victims of execution. While considerably higher than earlier and more widely-accepted estimates of Khmer Rouge executions, the Documentation Center of Cambodia (DC-Cam)'s Craig Etcheson defended such estimates of over one million executions as "plausible, given the nature of the mass grave and DC-Cam's methods, which are more likely to produce an under-count of bodies rather than an over-estimate."

Demographer Patrick Heuveline estimated that between 1.17 million and 3.42 million Cambodians died unnatural deaths between 1970 and 1979, with between 150,000 and 300,000 of those deaths occurring during the civil war. Heuveline's central estimate is 2.52 million excess deaths, of which 1.4 million were the direct result of violence. In 2015, Heuveline published an estimate of 1.2 to 2.8 million excess deaths under the Khmer Rouge. Despite being based on a house-to-house survey of Cambodians, the estimate of 3.3 million deaths promulgated by the Khmer Rouge's successor regime, the People's Republic of Kampuchea (PRK), is generally considered to be an exaggeration; among other methodological errors, the PRK authorities added the estimated number of victims that had been found in the partially-exhumed mass graves to the raw survey results, meaning that some victims would have been double-counted.

== Aftermath ==
=== Commemoration ===
Although executions of public officials of the old regime had taken place after Phnom Penh fell, 20 May 1975 is commemorated in Cambodia as the date that the Khmer Rouge campaign against private citizens began and 20 May is now observed annually as the "National Day of Remembrance" (Khmer: ទិវាជាតិនៃការចងចាំ, romanized: Tivea Cheate nei kar Changcham) and marked by a national holiday.

=== War crimes trials ===
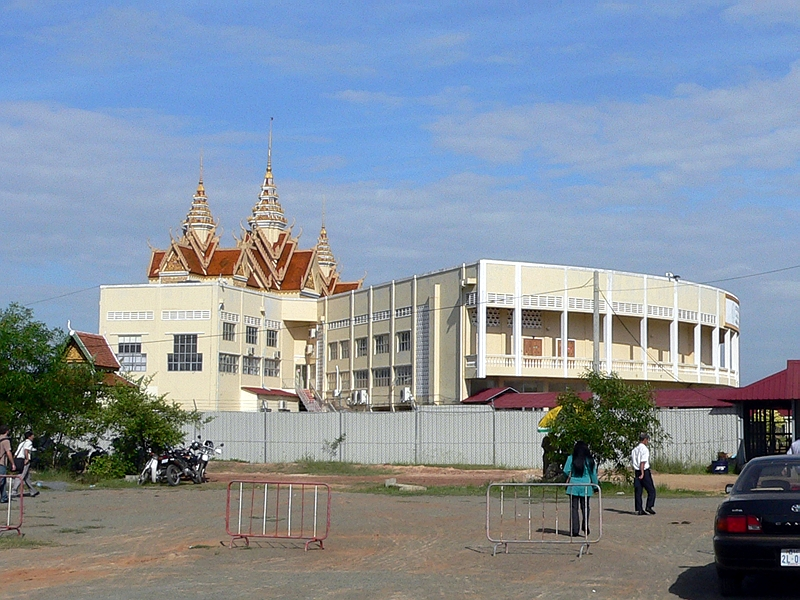
The tribunal's main building with the court room

The Vietnamese invasion of Cambodia ended the genocide by defeating and overthrowing the Khmer Rouge regime in January 1979. On 15 July 1979, the new Vietnamese installed government of Cambodia passed "Decree Law No. 1." This allowed for the trial of Pol Pot and Ieng Sary for the crime of genocide. They were given an American defense lawyer, Hope Stevens, and were tried in absentia and convicted of genocide.

The war continued until 1989 as an insurgency against the Vietnamese occupation by the Khmer Rouge and several other groups. Following the Vietnamese withdrawal, the 1991 Paris Peace Agreements were signed to mark the official end of the war. In order to include the Khmer Rouge in the agreement, the major powers agreed to avoid using the word "genocide" to describe their actions between 1975 and 1979. Nearly every major leader in Cambodia in 1991 had at one point allied themselves with the Pol Pot's Khmer Rouge, so they were reluctant to advocate bringing him to trial. The United States had avoided describing Khmer Rouge atrocities as genocide until 1989, claiming it was "counterproductive to finding peace" and only approved capturing and holding a trial for Pol Pot in 1997. There was also speculation that a trial might examine the U.S. bombing of Cambodia during the Vietnam War.

In 1997, Thomas Hammarberg, UN Human Rights chief in the UN Transitional Authority in Cambodia that followed the 1991 Paris Peace Accords, persuaded the two prime ministers of Cambodia to appeal to the UN to assist Cambodia in establishing a tribunal to try the senior leaders of the Khmer Rouge. That same year Cambodia's co-prime Ministers Norodom Ranariddh and Hun Sen wrote a letter to the Secretary-General of the United Nations, Kofi Annan, requesting assistance to set up trial proceedings against the senior leaders of the Khmer Rouge. In January 2001, the Cambodian National Assembly passed legislation to form a tribunal to try additional members of the Khmer Rouge regime. Following lengthy negotiations, an agreement between the Royal Government of Cambodia and the United Nations was reached and signed on 6 June 2003. The agreement was then endorsed by the United Nations General Assembly.

The tribunal tried and convicted three of the senior Khmer Rouge leaders, Kang Kek Iew (Duch) chief of the Tuol Sleng extermination prison in Phnom Penh, Nuon Chea (Brother Number Two) chief ideologist, and Khieu Samphan Head of State. Pol Pot, Brother Number One, died before trials began. Ieng Sary, Khmer Rouge Foreign Minister was tried but died before his verdict. Although only a few Khmer Rouge leaders were tried, over 350,000 Cambodians attended the trials in person, and they received considerable publicity by radio and television. In polls of Cambodians taken by the International Republican Institute and the University of California at Berkeley over two thirds of Cambodians surveyed expressed their support for the ECCC and said it had contributed significantly to their understanding of the crimes of the Khmer Rouge.

In 1999, Duch was interviewed by Nic Dunlop and Nate Thayer and admitted his guilt for crimes carried out in Tuol Sleng prison, where up to 17,000 political prisoners were executed. He expressed sorrow for his actions, stating that he was willing to stand trial and give evidence against his former comrades. During his trial in February and March 2009, Duch admitted that he was responsible for the crimes carried out at Tuol Sleng. On 26 July 2010, he was found guilty on charges of crimes against humanity, torture, and murder and was sentenced to 35 years in prison. On 3 February 2012 his previous sentence was replaced with life imprisonment. Duch died of lung disease in September 2020.

Nuon Chea ("Brother Number Two") was arrested on 19 September 2007. At the end of his 2013 trial he denied all charges, stating that he had not given orders "to mistreat or kill people to deprive them of food or commit any genocide." He was convicted in 2014 and sentenced to life imprisonment. He has expressed remorse and accepted moral responsibility for his crimes, stating "I would like to sincerely apologize to the public, the victims, the families, and all Cambodian people."

After being located in an opulent Phnom Penh villa, Ieng Sary was arrested on 12 November 2007 and indicted for crimes against humanity, as was his wife Ieng Thirith (née Khieu), who had been an unofficial adviser to the regime. On 17 November 2011, following evaluations from medical experts, Thirith was found to be unfit to stand trial due to a mental condition. Sary died of heart failure in 2013 while his trial was in progress.

Another senior Khmer Rouge leader, Khieu Samphan, was arrested on 19 November 2007 and charged with crimes against humanity. He was convicted in 2014 and sentenced to life imprisonment. At a hearing on 23 June 2017, Samphan stated a desire to bow to the memory of his guiltless victims, while also claiming that he suffered for those who fought for their ideal to have a brighter future.

=== The Cambodian Genocide Project ===
The Cambodian Genocide Project was founded by Gregory Stanton in 1982. Stanton started the project after directing the Church World Service and CARE relief program in Phnom Penh in 1980. Stanton proposed that the Khmer Rouge regime, which still held Cambodia's seat in the United Nations, should be charged in the International Court of Justice for violation of the Genocide Convention, to which Cambodia is a State-Party.

Stanton undertook investigations in Cambodia with Ben Kiernan of Yale University in the 1980s. They interviewed many survivors, visited mass graves and extermination prisons, and collected hours of videotaped eye-witness testimony. Kiernan wrote several books about the history of the Khmer Rouge regime. Stanton wrote the legal analyses for an ICJ case, which could be filed by any State-Party to the Genocide Convention without reservations. After meeting with Stanton, the Foreign Minister of Australia, Bill Hayden, spoke in favor of his country taking the case to the ICJ. However, the Australian Prime Minister received a call from the US State Department urging him to overrule Hayden. Other countries were also approached, but any indicating interest were promptly asked not to file the case by the US State Department. The Khmer Rouge were part of a coalition in Thailand and the Cambodian mountains that opposed the new Soviet and Vietnamese backed government in Phnom Penh. The coalition also included the non-communist resistance and the Royalist party. The US opposed the new government because of its Soviet support. To reverse State Department opposition to trials for the Khmer Rouge, Stanton, Kiernan, Sally Benson, and Craig Etcheson co-founded the Campaign to Oppose the Return of the Khmer Rouge. They drafted the Cambodian Genocide Justice Act, introduced by Senator Charles Robb. It ordered the State Department to make it US policy to try the Khmer Rouge, to create a State Department Office of Cambodian Investigations, to conduct a study by legal scholars to recommend how trials should be conducted, and it earmarked $800,000 to fund the effort.

In 1992, Stanton left his law professorship at Washington and Lee University to join the State Department Foreign Service. He realized that in order for the trials to take place, a committed advocate had to join the State Department to promote the project. In 1994, President Clinton signed the Cambodian Genocide Justice Act. That same year, the genocide of the Tutsis in Rwanda killed 800,000 Rwandans. The Director General of the Foreign Service, Genta Hawkins Holmes, directed Stanton back to Washington, DC and assigned him to the Office of UN Political Affairs in the Bureau of International Organizations, with the mandate to deal with the aftermath of the Rwandan genocide. Stanton joined the UN Commission of Inquiry on Rwanda and drafted UN Security Council Resolutions 955 and 978, which established the International Criminal Tribunal for Rwanda.

The Office of Cambodian Genocide Investigations was led by Ambassador Alphonse LaPorta and included Stanton. The Office issued a Request for Proposals to document the Khmer Rouge genocide. Stanton recused himself from any decision making on the bidding. Yale University's Cambodian Genocide Program, a successor to Stanton's Cambodian Genocide Project, won the contract. It was directed by Kiernan, Craig Etcheson, and Susan Cook. With Cambodian Youk Chang, they established the Documentation Center for Cambodia (DCCam). Helen Jarvis, working with DCCam, discovered thousands of pages of detailed records collected by the Khmer Rouge that documented their crimes. DCCam also conducted a survey of mass graves, and hundreds of eyewitness testimonies.

Helen Jarvis became a senior advisor to Deputy Prime Minister Sok An. She established the Cambodian government Task Force to plan creation of the Extraordinary Chambers in the Courts of Cambodia (ECCC), commonly called the Khmer Rouge Tribunal. Stanton worked with the Task Force and drafted the Internal Rule of Procedure for the Tribunal. The rules established the first active participation by victims in an international tribunal and provided for a Victims Support Unit. The UN and government of Cambodia signed the agreement to establish the ECCC in 2003. Judges and other personnel were appointed by the government and the UN. Financing was pledged by UN members and the Tribunal was established in 2006.

=== Denial of the genocide ===
In 1979, some members of the Canadian Workers' Communist Party published a pamphlet after their visit to Cambodia. The pamphlet stated that reports of mass killings and other atrocities were made up by the USA and it also stated that the reports were then used by the Soviet Union and Vietnam. According to them, a part of the death toll was made up by the US embassy in Thailand and then it was popularized by François Ponchaud. They also claimed that the reports and images of the Khmer Rouge's atrocities were made up by Thai intelligence and supporters of Lon Nol.

A few months before his death on 15 April 1998, Pol Pot was interviewed by Nate Thayer. During the interview, he stated that he had a clear conscience and denied being responsible for the genocide. Pol Pot asserted that he "came to carry out the struggle, not to kill people." According to Alex Alvarez, Pol Pot "portrayed himself as a misunderstood and unfairly vilified figure". In 2013, Cambodian Prime Minister Hun Sen unanimously passed legislation that prohibits the denial of the Cambodian genocide and other war crimes committed by the Khmer Rouge; a bill that mirrors legislation passed in European nations after the conclusion of the Holocaust.

The legislation was passed despite comments by opposition leader Kem Sokha, who is the deputy president of the Cambodian National Rescue Party. Sokha stated that exhibits at the Tuol Sleng Genocide Museum were fabricated and that the artifacts were faked by the Vietnamese following their invasion in 1979. Sokha's party has claimed that his comments were taken out of context. Cambodia scholar Ben Kiernan and Genocide Scholar Gregory Stanton personally saw the records and photographs at Tuol Sleng prison in 1980 and vouch for their authenticity.

=== Denial of support of the Khmer Rouge by China ===
In 1988, Cambodian Prime Minister Hun Sen, who was once a member of the Khmer Rouge, described China as "the root of everything that was evil" in Cambodia. But after he ousted his domestic rivals in a bloody factional coup d'état in July 1997, prompting outrage in the West, China immediately recognized the status quo and offered military aid. New interests soon came into alignment. Then, in 2000, Jiang Zemin, who was the CCP General Secretary and Chinese President, arrived in Cambodia for an official visit, the first by a Chinese leader since 1963.

In December 2000, while Jiang was visiting Cambodia, the Ministry of Foreign Affairs of China issued a statement in which it claimed that Beijing never supported the wrong policies of the Khmer Rouge while it was governing Cambodia and it refused to apologize. Yang Yanyi (杨燕怡), then the Deputy Director of the Asian Department in the Foreign Ministry of China, claimed: "This is an internal affair to be addressed by the Cambodians themselves. China had never interfered in the internal affairs of another country. Our assistance and support during that certain historical period was to support Cambodia's effort to safeguard its sovereignty and national independence. We never support wrong policies of other countries."

During the visit, Jiang met with Norodom Sihanouk and Cambodian Prime Minister Hun Sen, signing an agreement to offer US$12 million in aid to Cambodia. Even though the Cambodian government never mentioned the issue of the Khmer Rouge during Jiang's visit, protesters asked for an apology and they even asked for restitution from China, and the said request still persists. In 2015, Youk Chhang, the executive director of the Documentation Center of Cambodia, pointed out that "Chinese advisers were there with the prison guards and all the way to the top leader. China has never admitted or apologized for this." In 2009, during the court trials of some of the former Khmer Rouge leaders, Chinese Foreign Ministry spokeswoman Jiang Yu claimed: "For a long time China has ... had normal and friendly relations with previous Cambodian governments, including that of Democratic Kampuchea. As everyone knows, the government of Democratic Kampuchea had a legal seat at the United Nations, and had established broad foreign relations with more than 70 countries."

=== Recognition of rescuers ===
The Rescuers exhibition, which ran from 2011 to 2015, recognized individuals who risked their lives to save others. The Cambodian rescuers are paired alongside similar profiles of courage from other world genocides. Similar recognition to rescuers of the Cambodian Genocide by the Australian social harmony group, Courage to Care, which published an educational resource on the subject.

== In literature and media ==
- The book Cambodge année zéro ("Cambodia Year Zero") by François Ponchaud was published in French in 1977 and translated into English in 1978. Ponchaud was one of the first authors to bring the Cambodian genocide to the world's attention. Ponchaud has said that the genocide "was above all, the translation into action the particular vision of a man [sic]: A person who has been spoiled by a corrupt regime cannot be reformed, he must be physically eliminated from the brotherhood of the pure." Murder of a Gentle Land: The Untold Story of a Communist Genocide in Cambodia by John Barron and Anthony Paul was published in 1977. The book drew on accounts from refugees, and an abridged version published in Reader's Digest was widely read.
- Filmmaker Rithy Panh, a survivor of the genocide, is "considered by many to be the cinematic voice of Cambodia." Panh has directed several documentaries on the genocide, including S-21: The Khmer Rouge Killing Machine, which has been noted by critics for "allow[ing] us to observe how memory and time may collapse to render the past as present and by doing so reveal the ordinary face of evil."
- The genocide is portrayed in the 1984 Academy Award–winning film The Killing Fields and in Patricia McCormick's 2012 novel Never Fall Down.
- The genocide is also recounted by Loung Ung in her memoir First They Killed My Father (2000). The book was adapted into a 2017 biographical film directed by Angelina Jolie. Set in 1975, the film depicts five-year-old Ung who is forced to be trained as a child soldier while her siblings are sent to labor camps by the Khmer Rouge regime.
- The film Year Zero: The Silent Death of Cambodia is a 1979 British television documentary written and presented by the Australian journalist John Pilger. First broadcast on British television on 30 October 1979, the film recounts the extensive bombing of Cambodia by the United States in the 1970s as a secret chapter of the Vietnam War, the subsequent brutality and genocide that occurred when Pol Pot and his Khmer Rouge militia took over, the poverty and suffering of the people, and the limited aid since given by the West. Pilger's first report on Cambodia was published in a special issue of the Daily Mirror.

== See also ==
- Bibliography of the Cambodian genocide
- Outline of the Cambodian genocide
- Allegations of United States support for the Khmer Rouge
- Cambodian-Vietnamese War
- Vietnamese border raids in Thailand
- Ba Chúc massacre
- Bù Đốp masscare
- Dangrek Incident
- Koh Kong Thai Displacement Campaign
- Cambodian genocide denial
- Criticism of communist states
- Eastern Zone massacres
- Effects of genocide on youth
- Mass killings under communist regimes
- Operation Freedom Deal
- Genocides in history
- List of genocides
