= Bibliography of the Cambodian genocide =

Cambodian genocide
- Part of the Cold War in Asia and the aftermath of the Cambodian Civil War
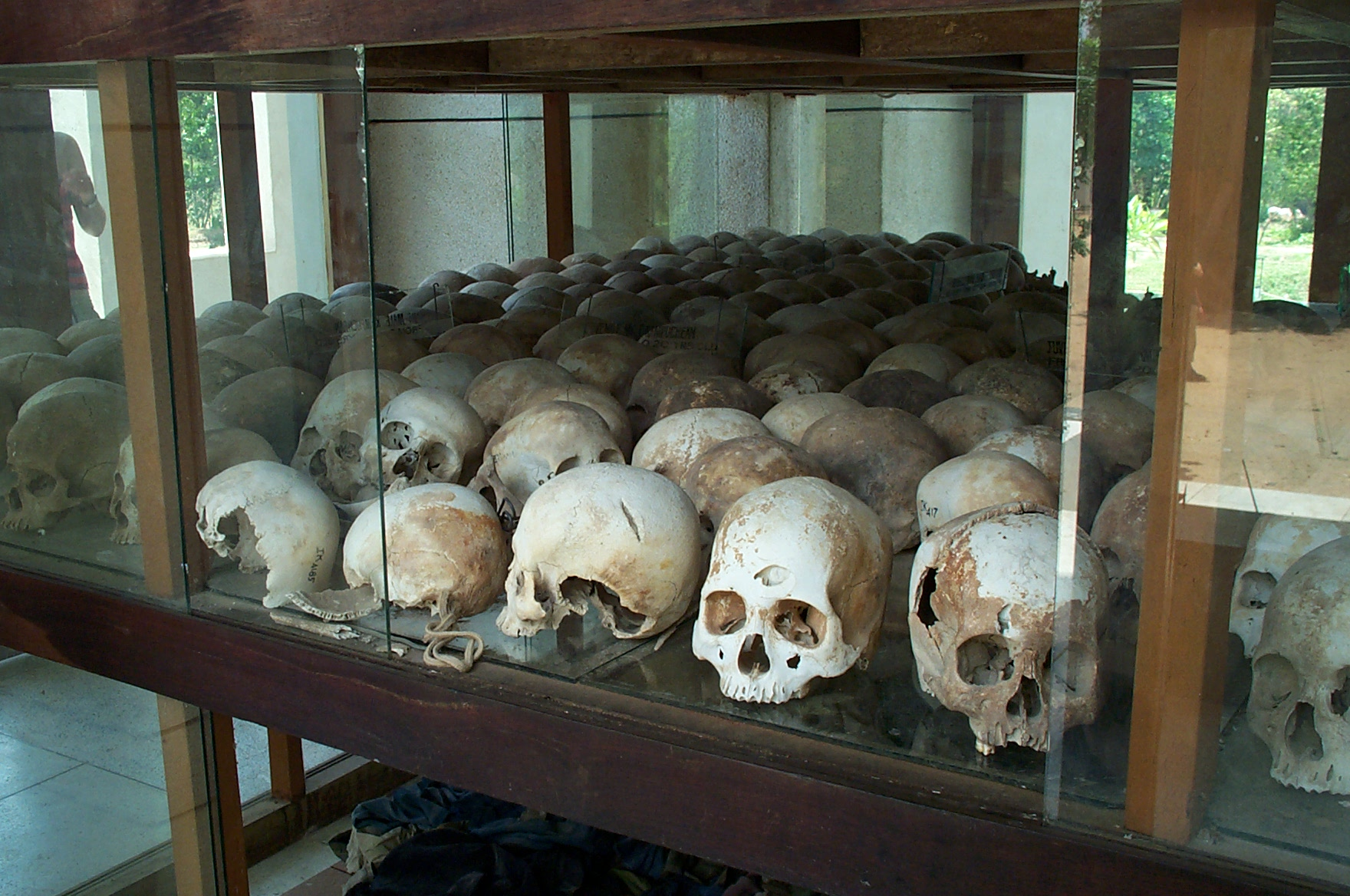
- Skulls at the Choeung Ek memorial in Cambodia
- Location: Democratic Kampuchea (present-day Cambodia)
- Date: 17 April 1975 – 7 January 1979 (3 years, 8 months and 20 days)
- Target: Cambodia's previous military and political leadership, middle-class professionals, businesspeople, intellectuals along with ethnic, linguistic, and religious minorities
- Attack type: Genocide, ethnic cleansing, mass murder, cultural genocide, famine, forced labour, torture, mass rape, summary execution
- Deaths: 1.2–2.2 million
- Perpetrators: Khmer Rouge, Kampuchea Revolutionary Army, Santebal, Communist Party of Kampuchea
- Motive: Establishment of an agrarian socialist society based on Maoist principles; Cultural reset (Year Zero); Khmer nationalism and racism; Xenophobia; Anti-Vietnamese sentiment; Anti-Western sentiment; Anti-intellectualism; Anti-religious sentiment

This is a bibliography of the Cambodian genocide. Bibliography contains academic level English language books (including translations) and journal articles.

The Cambodian genocide (Note: Khmer: ប្រល័យពូជសាសន៍នៅកម្ពុជា, lit. 'Genocide in Cambodia', or អំពើប្រល័យពូជសាសន៍ខ្មែរ, 'Khmer genocidal act(s)') was the systematic persecution and killing of Cambodian citizens (Note: In 2010, the Extraordinary Chambers in the Courts of Cambodia ruled for the indictment of Nuon Chea and Khieu Samphan that both former Khmer Rouge officials are guilty of committing ethnic cleansing exclusively against ethnic Vietnamese and Chams.) by the Khmer Rouge under the general secretaryship of Pol Pot. It resulted in the deaths of approximately 2 million people from 1975 to 1979, around 25% of Cambodia's population in 1975 (c. 7.8 million).

Works listed here are cited in the notes or bibliographies of scholarly sources. Each is published by an academic or major press, written by a recognized expert, or substantially reviewed in scholarly journals; borderline cases are omitted. A selection of primary sources are included. Many of the books below carry their own bibliographies; see the Further reading section for other bibliographies, and the External links section for historical sites, academic sites, and museums.

Citations follow APA style. (Note: Entries are in plain text APA 7 format without templates; templates are used only for reviews and notes.) Book have citations to academic journal or mainstream published reviews when available. For books only partly about the subject, relevant chapter or section titles are provided when useful and available. Translators of the original-language edition are included when possible. In cases where a title or name has appeared with more than one English spelling, the most recent published form is used and a footnote documents any earlier title under which the work appeared.

== General histories ==
- Becker, E. (1986). When the war was over: The voices of Cambodia's revolution and its people. Simon and Schuster.
- Chandler, D. P. (1991). The tragedy of Cambodian history: Politics, war, and revolution since 1945. Yale University Press.
- Chandler, D. P. (2008). A history of Cambodia (4th ed.). Westview Press.
- Kiernan, B. (1985). How Pol Pot came to power: A history of communism in Kampuchea, 1930–1975. Verso.
- Kiernan, B. (1996). The Pol Pot regime: Race, power, and genocide in Cambodia under the Khmer Rouge, 1975–79. Yale University Press.
- Vickery, M. (1984). Cambodia 1975–1982. George Allen and Unwin.

== Biographies ==
- Chandler, D. P. (1999). Brother number one: A political biography of Pol Pot (Rev. ed.). Westview Press.
- Dunlop, N. (2006). The lost executioner: A journey to the heart of the killing fields. Walker.
- Mehta, H. C., & Mehta, J. B. (1999). Hun Sen: Strongman of Cambodia. Graham Brash.
- Osborne, M. (1994). Sihanouk: Prince of light, prince of darkness. University of Hawai'i Press.
- Short, P. (2005). Pol Pot: Anatomy of a nightmare. Henry Holt.

== The Khmer Rouge regime ==
- Carney, T. M. (1977). Communist party power in Kampuchea (Cambodia): Documents and discussion. Cornell University Department of Asian Studies.
- Chandler, D. P. (1976). The constitution of Democratic Kampuchea (Cambodia): The semantics of revolutionary change. Pacific Affairs, 49(3), 506–515. JSTOR 2755501
- Chandler, D. P., & Kiernan, B. (Eds.). (1983). Revolution and its aftermath in Kampuchea: Eight essays. Yale University Southeast Asia Studies.
- Chandler, D. P., Kiernan, B., & Boua, C. (Eds.). (1988). Pol Pot plans the future: Confidential leadership documents from Democratic Kampuchea, 1976–1977. Yale University Southeast Asia Studies.
- Chandler, D. P. (1999). Voices from S-21: Terror and history in Pol Pot's secret prison. University of California Press.
- Cunha, M. P. e, Clegg, S., Rego, A., & Lancione, M. (2012). The organization (Angkar) as a state of exception: The case of the S-21 extermination camp, Phnom Penh. Journal of Political Power, 5(2), 279–299.
- Etcheson, C. (1984). The rise and demise of Democratic Kampuchea. Westview Press.
- Frieson, K. (1988). The political nature of Democratic Kampuchea. Pacific Affairs, 61(3), 405–427. JSTOR 2760458
- Heder, S. R. (2004). Cambodian communism and the Vietnamese model: Vol. 1. Imitation and independence, 1930–1975. White Lotus Press.
- Jackson, K. D. (Ed.). (1989). Cambodia, 1975–1978: Rendezvous with death. Princeton University Press.
- Kiernan, B., & Boua, C. (Eds.). (1982). Peasants and politics in Kampuchea, 1942–1981. Zed Press.
- Kiernan, B. (1996). The Pol Pot regime: Race, power, and genocide in Cambodia under the Khmer Rouge, 1975–79. Yale University Press.
- Locard, H. (2004). Pol Pot's little red book: The sayings of Angkar. Silkworm Books.
- Locard, H. (2005). State violence in Democratic Kampuchea (1975–1979) and retribution (1979–2004). European Review of History, 12(1), 121–143.
- Locard, H. (Ed. & Trans.). (2023). Jungle heart of the Khmer Rouge: The memoirs of Phi Phuon, Pol Pot's Jarai aide-de-camp, and the role of tribal minorities in the Cambodian revolution. NIAS Press.
- McIntyre, K. (1996). Geography as destiny: Cities, villages and Khmer Rouge orientalism. Comparative Studies in Society and History, 38(4), 730–758.
- Path, K., & Kanavou, A. (2015). Converts, not ideologues? The Khmer Rouge practice of thought reform in Cambodia, 1975–1978. Journal of Political Ideologies, 20(3), 304–332.
- Ponchaud, F. (1978). Cambodia: Year zero (N. Amphoux, Trans.). Holt, Rinehart and Winston. (Original work published 1977)
- Pribble, S. (2023). The barter economy of the Khmer Rouge labor camps. Routledge.
- Slocomb, M. (2006). Chikreng rebellion: Coup and its aftermath in Democratic Kampuchea. Journal of the Royal Asiatic Society, 16(1), 59–72.
- Tyner, J. A. (2008). The killing of Cambodia: Geography, genocide and the unmaking of space. Ashgate.
- Tyner, J. A., & Rice, S. (2015). To live and let die: Food, famine, and administrative violence in Democratic Kampuchea, 1975–1979. Political Geography, 48, 1–10.
- Tyner, J. A. (2017). From rice fields to killing fields: Nature, life, and labor under the Khmer Rouge. Syracuse University Press. JSTOR j.ctt1pk864f
- Tyner, J. A. (2019). The nature of revolution: Art and politics under the Khmer Rouge. University of Georgia Press. JSTOR j.ctt22nmc98

== Victims ==
- Amer, R. (1994). The ethnic Vietnamese in Cambodia: A minority at risk?. Contemporary Southeast Asia, 16(2), 210–238.
- Bruckmayr, P. (2006). The Cham Muslims of Cambodia: From forgotten minority to focal point of Islamic internationalism. American Journal of Islam and Society, 23(3), 1–23.
- Clayton, T. (1998). Building the new Cambodia: Educational destruction and construction under the Khmer Rouge, 1975–1979. History of Education Quarterly, 38(1), 1. JSTOR 369662
- Ehrentraut, S. (2011). Perpetually temporary: Citizenship and ethnic Vietnamese in Cambodia. Ethnic and Racial Studies, 34(5), 779–798.
- Harris, I. (2005). Cambodian Buddhism: History and practice. University of Hawai'i Press.
- Harris, I. (2012). Buddhism in a dark age: Cambodian monks under Pol Pot. University of Hawai'i Press.
- Jacobs, R. P. (2022). Married by the revolution: Forced marriage as a strategy of control in Khmer Rouge Cambodia. Journal of Genocide Research, 24(3), 357–379.
- Kiernan, B. (1986). Kampuchea's ethnic Chinese under Pol Pot: A case of systematic social discrimination. Journal of Contemporary Asia, 16(1), 18–29.
- Kiernan, B. (1988). Orphans of genocide: The Cham Muslims of Kampuchea under Pol Pot. Bulletin of Concerned Asian Scholars, 20(4), 2–33.
- Kiernan, B. (2001). The ethnic element in the Cambodian genocide. In D. Chirot & M. E. P. Seligman (Eds.), Ethnopolitical warfare: Causes, consequences, and possible solutions (pp. 83–91). American Psychological Association.
- Kiernan, B. (2021). The Pol Pot regime's simultaneous war against Vietnam and genocide of Cambodia's ethnic Vietnamese minority. Critical Asian Studies, 53(3), 342–358.
- LeVine, P. (2010). Love and dread in Cambodia: Weddings, births, and ritual harm under the Khmer Rouge. NUS Press.
- Marston, J., & Guthrie, E. (Eds.). (2004). History, Buddhism, and new religious movements in Cambodia. University of Hawai'i Press.
- Mowell, B. D. (2021). Religious communities as targets of the Khmer Rouge genocide. In The Routledge handbook of religion, mass atrocity, and genocide (pp. 195–204). Routledge.
- Osman, Y. (2002). Oukoubah: Justice for the Cham Muslims under Democratic Kampuchea regime. Documentation Center of Cambodia.
- Rashid, A. (2023). Gender and genocide in Cambodia: Surviving Khmer Rouge. Routledge.
- Thun, T., & Duong Keo. (2021). Ethnic Vietnamese and the Khmer Rouge: The genocide and race debate. Critical Asian Studies, 53(3), 325–341.
- Tyner, J. A., & Molana, H. H. (2020). Ideologies of Khmer Rouge family policy: Contextualizing sexual and gender-based violence during the Cambodian genocide. Genocide Studies International, 13(2), 168–189.

== Aftermath ==
- Amer, R. (1990). The United Nations and Kampuchea: The issue of representation and its implications. Bulletin of Concerned Asian Scholars, 22(3), 52–60.
- Chan, S. (2004). Survivors: Cambodian refugees in the United States. University of Illinois Press.
- Clymer, K. (2004). The United States and Cambodia, 1969–2000: A troubled relationship. RoutledgeCurzon.
- de Walque, D. (2005). Selective mortality during the Khmer Rouge period in Cambodia. Population and Development Review, 31(2), 351–368.
- de Walque, D. (2006). The socio-demographic legacy of the Khmer Rouge period in Cambodia. Population Studies, 60(2), 223–231.
- Ea Meng-Try. (1981). Kampuchea: A country adrift. Population and Development Review, 7(2), 209. JSTOR 1972621
- Grasse, D. (2024). State terror and long-run development: The persistence of the Khmer Rouge. American Political Science Review, 118(1), 195–212.
- Heuveline, P. (1998). 'Between one and three million': Towards the demographic reconstruction of a decade of Cambodian history (1970–79). Population Studies, 52(1), 49–65.
- Heuveline, P. (2001). Approaches to measuring genocide: Excess mortality during the Khmer Rouge period. In D. Chirot & M. E. P. Seligman (Eds.), Ethnopolitical warfare: Causes, consequences, and possible solutions (pp. 93–108). American Psychological Association.
- Heuveline, P., & Poch, B. (2007). The phoenix population: Demographic crisis and rebound in Cambodia. Demography, 44(2), 405–426.
- Heuveline, P. (2015). The boundaries of genocide: Quantifying the uncertainty of the death toll during the Pol Pot regime in Cambodia (1975–79). Population Studies, 69(2), 201–218.
- Kiernan, B. (2003). The demography of genocide in Southeast Asia: The death tolls in Cambodia, 1975–79, and East Timor, 1975–80. Critical Asian Studies, 35(4), 585–597.
- Metzl, J. F. (1996). Western responses to human rights abuses in Cambodia, 1975–80. Macmillan.
- Neupert, R. F., & Prum, V. (2005). Cambodia: Reconstructing the demographic stab of the past and forecasting the demographic scar of the future. European Journal of Population, 21(2–3), 217–246.
- Shawcross, W. (1984). The quality of mercy: Cambodia, holocaust and modern conscience. Simon and Schuster.
- Um, K. (2015). From the land of shadows: War, revolution, and the making of the Cambodian diaspora. New York University Press.
- Williams, T., & Duong Keo. (2024). Counting tigers: Estimating the number of Khmer Rouge during Democratic Kampuchea. Journal of Genocide Research, 26(3), 307–327.

=== People's Revolutionary Tribunal ===
- De Nike, H. J., Quigley, J., & Robinson, K. J. (Eds.). (2000). Genocide in Cambodia: Documents from the trial of Pol Pot and Ieng Sary. University of Pennsylvania Press.
- Gutman, T. H. (2015). Cambodia, 1979: Trying Khmer Rouge leaders for genocide. In K. Sellars (Ed.), Trials for international crimes in Asia (pp. 167–190). Cambridge University Press.
- Selbmann, F. (2016). The 1979 trial of the People's Revolutionary Tribunal and implications for ECCC. In S. M. Meisenberg & I. Stegmiller (Eds.), The Extraordinary Chambers in the Courts of Cambodia: Assessing their contribution to international criminal law (pp. 77–102). T.M.C. Asser Press.

=== Khmer Rouge tribunal ===
- Bernath, J. (2016). 'Complex political victims' in the aftermath of mass atrocity: Reflections on the Khmer Rouge tribunal in Cambodia. International Journal of Transitional Justice, 10(1), 46–66.
- Bernath, J. (2018). The politics of difference in transitional justice: Genocide and the construction of victimhood at the Khmer Rouge Tribunal. Journal of Intervention and Statebuilding, 12(3), 367–384.
- Bernath, J. (2023). The Khmer Rouge tribunal: Power, politics, and resistance in transitional justice. University of Wisconsin Press. JSTOR jj.4032528
- Ciorciari, J. D., & Heindel, A. (2014a). Experiments in international criminal justice: Lessons from the Khmer Rouge tribunal. Michigan Journal of International Law, 35(2), 369–442.
- Ciorciari, J. D., & Heindel, A. (2014b). Hybrid justice: The Extraordinary Chambers in the Courts of Cambodia. University of Michigan Press.
- Cruvellier, T. (2014). The master of confessions: The making of a Khmer Rouge torturer (A. Gilly, Trans.). Ecco. (Original work published 2011)
- Elander, M. (2018). Figuring victims in international criminal justice: The case of the Khmer Rouge tribunal. Routledge.
- Etcheson, C. (2005). After the killing fields: Lessons from the Cambodian genocide. Praeger.
- Etcheson, C. (2020). Extraordinary justice: Law, politics, and the Khmer Rouge tribunals. Columbia University Press.
- Fawthrop, T., & Jarvis, H. (2004). Getting away with genocide? Elusive justice and the Khmer Rouge tribunal. Pluto Press.
- Gibson, J. L., Sonis, J., & Hean, S. (2010). Cambodians' support for the rule of law on the eve of the Khmer Rouge trials. International Journal of Transitional Justice, 4(3), 377–396.
- Gidley, R. (2019). Illiberal transitional justice and the Extraordinary Chambers in the Courts of Cambodia. Palgrave Macmillan.
- Hannum, H. (1989). International law and Cambodian genocide: The sounds of silence. Human Rights Quarterly, 11(1), 82. JSTOR 761936
- Heder, S. R., & Tittemore, B. D. (2004). Seven candidates for prosecution: Accountability for the crimes of the Khmer Rouge. Documentation Center of Cambodia.
- Herman, J. (2013). Realities of victim participation: The civil party system in practice at the Extraordinary Chambers in the Courts of Cambodia (ECCC). Contemporary Justice Review, 16(4), 461–481.
- Hinton, A. L. (2016). Man or monster? The trial of a Khmer Rouge torturer. Duke University Press.
- Hinton, A. L. (2018). The justice facade: Trials of transition in Cambodia. Oxford University Press.
- Hinton, A. L. (2022). Anthropological witness: Lessons from the Khmer Rouge tribunal. Cornell University Press.
- Jarvis, H. (2014). "Justice for the deceased": Victims' participation in the Extraordinary Chambers in the Courts of Cambodia. Genocide Studies and Prevention, 8(2), 19–27.
- Killean, R. (2018). Victims, atrocity and international criminal justice. Routledge.
- Lambourne, W. (2014). Justice after genocide: Impunity and the Extraordinary Chambers in the Courts of Cambodia. Genocide Studies and Prevention, 8(2), 29–43.
- Maguire, P. (2005). Facing death in Cambodia. Columbia University Press.
- McCargo, D. (2011). Politics by other means? The virtual trials of the Khmer Rouge tribunal. International Affairs, 87(3), 613–627.
- McKeever, D. (2010). Evidence obtained through torture before the Khmer Rouge tribunal: Unlawful pragmatism?. Journal of International Criminal Justice, 8(2), 615–630.
- Meisenberg, S. M., & Stegmiller, I. (Eds.). (2016). The Extraordinary Chambers in the Courts of Cambodia: Assessing their contribution to international criminal law. T.M.C. Asser Press.
- Menzel, J. (2007). Justice delayed or too late for justice? The Khmer Rouge Tribunal and the Cambodian "genocide" 1975–79. Journal of Genocide Research, 9(2), 215–233.
- Sperfeldt, C. (2012a). Cambodian civil society and the Khmer Rouge tribunal. International Journal of Transitional Justice, 6(1), 149–160.
- Sperfeldt, C. (2012b). Collective reparations at the Extraordinary Chambers in the Courts of Cambodia. International Criminal Law Review, 12(3), 457–490.
- Sperfeldt, C. (2022). Practices of reparations in international criminal justice. Cambridge University Press.
- Stegmiller, I. (2014). Legal developments in civil party participation at the Extraordinary Chambers in the Courts of Cambodia. Leiden Journal of International Law, 27(2), 465–477.

== International involvement ==
- Chanda, N. (1986). Brother enemy: The war after the war. Harcourt Brace Jovanovich.
- Chang, P.-M. (1983). Some reflections on the Sino-Vietnamese conflict over Kampuchea. International Affairs, 59(3), 381–389. JSTOR 2618792
- Chang, P.-M. (1985). Kampuchea between China and Vietnam. Singapore University Press.
- Ciorciari, J. D. (2014). China and the Pol Pot regime. Cold War History, 14(2), 215–235.
- Edwards, M. (2004). The rise of the Khmer Rouge in Cambodia: Internal or external origins?. Asian Affairs, 35(1), 56–67.
- Evans, G., & Rowley, K. (1990). Red brotherhood at war: Vietnam, Cambodia and Laos since 1975 (2nd ed.). Verso.
- Gottesman, E. (2003). Cambodia after the Khmer Rouge: Inside the politics of nation building. Yale University Press.
- Kiernan, B. (Ed.). (1993). Genocide and democracy in Cambodia: The Khmer Rouge, the United Nations and the international community. Yale University Southeast Asia Studies.
- Klintworth, G. (1989). Vietnam's intervention in Cambodia in international law. Australian Government Publishing Service.
- Mertha, A. C. (2012). Surrealpolitik: The experience of Chinese experts in Democratic Kampuchea, 1975–1979. Cross-Currents: East Asian History and Culture Review, 1(2), 338–364.
- Mertha, A. C. (2014). Brothers in arms: Chinese aid to the Khmer Rouge, 1975–1979. Cornell University Press.
- Morris, S. J. (1999). Why Vietnam invaded Cambodia: Political culture and the causes of war. Stanford University Press.
- Owen, T., & Kiernan, B. (2007). Bombs over Cambodia: New light on US air war. Asia-Pacific Journal, 5(5).
- Path, K. (2020). Vietnam's strategic thinking during the Third Indochina War. University of Wisconsin Press. JSTOR j.ctvvsqc44
- Shawcross, W. (1979). Sideshow: Kissinger, Nixon and the destruction of Cambodia. Simon and Schuster.
- Slocomb, M. (2003). The People's Republic of Kampuchea, 1979–1989: The revolution after Pol Pot. Silkworm Books.
- van der Kroef, J. M. (1979). Cambodia: From "Democratic Kampuchea" to "People's Republic". Asian Survey, 19(8), 731–750. JSTOR 2643718
- Westad, O. A., & Quinn-Judge, S. (Eds.). (2006). The Third Indochina War: Conflict between China, Vietnam and Cambodia, 1972–79. Routledge.
- Wheeler, N. J. (2000). Saving strangers: Humanitarian intervention in international society. Oxford University Press. (Chapter 4: "Vietnam's intervention in Cambodia: The triumph of realism over common humanity?")

== Historiography ==
- Beachler, D. W. (2009). Arguing about Cambodia: Genocide and political interest. Holocaust and Genocide Studies, 23(2), 214–238.
- Beachler, D. W. (2011). The genocide debate: Politicians, academics, and victims. Palgrave Macmillan.
- Chandler, D. P. (1983). Revising the past in Democratic Kampuchea: When was the birthday of the party? Pacific Affairs, 56(2), 288–300. JSTOR 2758655
- Cook, S. E. (Ed.). (2006). Genocide in Cambodia and Rwanda: New perspectives. Transaction Publishers.
- Fein, H. (1993). Revolutionary and antirevolutionary genocides: A comparison of state murders in Democratic Kampuchea, 1975 to 1979, and in Indonesia, 1965 to 1966. Comparative Studies in Society and History, 35(4), 796–823.
- Gellately, R., & Kiernan, B. (Eds.). (2003). The specter of genocide: Mass murder in historical perspective. Cambridge University Press.
- Hinton, A. L. (1998a). A head for an eye: Revenge in the Cambodian genocide. American Ethnologist, 25(3), 352–377.
- Hinton, A. L. (1998b). Why did you kill? The Cambodian genocide and the dark side of face and honor. The Journal of Asian Studies, 57(1), 93–122. JSTOR 2659025
- Hinton, A. L. (2005). Why did they kill? Cambodia in the shadow of genocide. University of California Press.
- Hinton, A. L. (Ed.). (2002). Annihilating difference: The anthropology of genocide. University of California Press.
- Johansson, P. (2018). Forgetting and remembering Pol Pot: Judging the Cold War past in Sweden. In J. Keene & E. Rechniewski (Eds.), Seeking meaning, seeking justice in a post-Cold War world (pp. 62–80). Brill.
- Kiernan, B. (2001). Myth, nationalism and genocide. Journal of Genocide Research, 3(2), 187–206.
- Kiernan, B. (2007). Blood and soil: A world history of genocide and extermination from Sparta to Darfur. Yale University Press.
- Kiernan, B. (2008). Genocide and resistance in Southeast Asia: Documentation, denial and justice in Cambodia and East Timor. Transaction Publishers.
- Kiernan, B. (2017). Cambodia: Detonator of communism's implosion. In J. Fürst, S. Pons, & M. Selden (Eds.), The Cambridge history of communism: Vol. 3. Endgames? Late communism in global perspective, 1968 to the present (pp. 121–150). Cambridge University Press.
- Kiernan, B. (2023). The genocides in Cambodia, 1975–1979. In B. Kiernan, W. Lower, N. Naimark, & S. Straus (Eds.), The Cambridge world history of genocide: Vol. 3 (pp. 518–549). Cambridge University Press.
- Kissi, E. (2006). Revolution and genocide in Ethiopia and Cambodia. Lexington Books.
- Martin, M. A. (1994). Cambodia: A shattered society (M. W. McLeod, Trans.). University of California Press.
- Raszelenberg, P. (1999). The Khmers Rouges and the final solution. History & Memory, 11(2), 62–93.
- Schabas, W. (2001). Cambodia: Was it really genocide?. Human Rights Quarterly, 23(2), 470–477.
- Valentino, B. A. (2004). Final solutions: Mass killing and genocide in the twentieth century. Cornell University Press.
- Weitz, E. D. (2003). A century of genocide: Utopias of race and nation. Princeton University Press.
- Williams, T., & Neilsen, R. (2019). "They will rot the society, rot the party, and rot the army": Toxification as an ideology and motivation for perpetrating violence in the Khmer Rouge genocide?. Terrorism and Political Violence, 31(3), 494–515.

=== Memory studies ===
- Bennett, C. (2018). Living with the dead in the killing fields of Cambodia. Journal of Southeast Asian Studies, 49(2), 184–203.
- Benzaquen-Gautier, S., & Porée, A.-L. (2024). Tuol Sleng Genocide Museum: A multifaceted history of Khmer Rouge crimes. Brill.
- Boyle, D. (2009). Shattering silence: Traumatic memory and reenactment in Rithy Panh's S-21: The Khmer Rouge Killing Machine. Framework, 50(1–2), 95–106.
- Chandler, D. (2008). Cambodia deals with its past: Collective memory, demonisation and induced amnesia. Totalitarian Movements and Political Religions, 9(2–3), 355–369.
- Ebihara, M. M., Mortland, C. A., & Ledgerwood, J. (Eds.). (1994). Cambodian culture since 1975: Homeland and exile. Cornell University Press.
- Frings, K. V. (1997). Rewriting Cambodian history to 'adapt' it to a new political context: The Kampuchean People's Revolutionary Party's historiography (1979–1991). Modern Asian Studies, 31(4), 807–846.
- Guillou, A. Y. (2012). An alternative memory of the Khmer Rouge genocide: The dead of the mass graves and the land guardian spirits [Neak ta]. South East Asia Research, 20(2), 207–226. doi:10.5367/sear.2012.0102
- Guillou, A. Y. (2018). The 'master of the land': Cult activities around Pol Pot's tomb. Journal of Genocide Research, 20(2), 275–289.
- Hinton, A. L., & O'Neill, K. L. (Eds.). (2009). Genocide: Truth, memory, and representation. Duke University Press.
- Hughes, R. (2003). The abject artefacts of memory: Photographs from Cambodia's genocide. Media, Culture & Society, 25(1), 23–44.
- Hughes, R. (2008). Dutiful tourism: Encountering the Cambodian genocide. Asia Pacific Viewpoint, 49(3), 318–330.
- Hughes, R. (2015). Ordinary theatre and extraordinary law at the Khmer Rouge Tribunal. Environment and Planning D: Society and Space, 33(4), 714–731.
- Ledgerwood, J. (1997). The Cambodian Tuol Sleng Museum of Genocidal Crimes: National narrative. Museum Anthropology, 21(1), 82–98.
- Ly, B. (2003). Devastated vision(s): The Khmer Rouge scopic regime in Cambodia. Art Journal, 62(1), 66–81.
- Ly, B. (2020). Traces of trauma: Cambodian visual culture and national identity in the aftermath of genocide. University of Hawai'i Press.
- Manning, P. (2012). Governing memory: Justice, reconciliation and outreach at the Extraordinary Chambers in the Courts of Cambodia. Memory Studies, 5(2), 165–181.
- Manning, P. (2017). Transitional justice and memory in Cambodia: Beyond the Extraordinary Chambers. Routledge.
- Schlund-Vials, C. J. (2012). War, genocide, and justice: Cambodian American memory work. University of Minnesota Press.
- Sion, B. (2011). Conflicting sites of memory in post-genocide Cambodia. Humanity: An International Journal of Human Rights, Humanitarianism, and Development, 2(1), 1–21.
- Sirik, S. (2020). Memory construction of former Khmer Rouge cadres: Resistance to dominant discourses of genocide in Cambodia. Journal of Political Power, 13(2), 233–251.
- Troeung, Y.-D. (2015). Human rights and the literary self-portrait: Vann Nath's A Cambodian Prison Portrait: One Year in the Khmer Rouge's S-21. Rethinking History, 19(2), 235–251.
- Tyner, J. A., Alvarez, G. B., & Colucci, A. R. (2012). Memory and the everyday landscape of violence in post-genocide Cambodia. Social & Cultural Geography, 13(8), 853–871.
- Tyner, J. A. (2016). Landscape, memory, and post-violence in Cambodia. Rowman & Littlefield International.
- Williams, T. (2022). Remembering and silencing complexity in post-genocide memorialisation: Cambodia's Tuol Sleng Genocide Museum. Memory Studies, 15(1), 3–19.
- Zucker, E. M. (2013). Forest of struggle: Moralities of remembrance in upland Cambodia. University of Hawai'i Press.

== Primary sources ==
=== Survivor testimony and memoirs ===
- Affonço, D. (2007). To the end of hell: One woman's struggle to survive Cambodia's Khmer Rouge (M. Burn & K. Hogben, Trans.). Reportage Press. (Note: Originally published as La digue des veuves: Rescapée de l'enfer des Khmers rouges. Presses de la Renaissance, 2005.)
- Bizot, F. (2003). The gate (E. Cameron, Trans.). Harvill. (Original work published 2000)
- Chon, G., & Thet Sambath. (2010). Behind the killing fields: A Khmer Rouge leader and one of his victims. University of Pennsylvania Press.
- Dith Pran (Comp.), & DePaul, K. (Ed.). (1997). Children of Cambodia's killing fields: Memoirs by survivors. Yale University Press.
- Him, C. (2000). When broken glass floats: Growing up under the Khmer Rouge. W. W. Norton.
- Ngor, H., & Warner, R. (1987). A Cambodian odyssey. Macmillan.
- Panh, R., & Bataille, C. (2012). The elimination: A survivor of the Khmer Rouge confronts his past and the commandant of the killing fields (J. Cullen, Trans.). Other Press. (Original work published 2012)
- Pin Yathay, & Man, J. (1987). Stay alive, my son. Free Press.
- Ung, L. (2000). First they killed my father: A daughter of Cambodia remembers. HarperCollins.
- Vann Nath. (1998). A Cambodian prison portrait: One year in the Khmer Rouge's S-21 (Moeun Chhean Nariddh, Trans.). White Lotus.
- Yimsut, R. (2011). Facing the Khmer Rouge: A Cambodian journey. Rutgers University Press. JSTOR j.ctt5hj3m0

=== Archives and documentation ===
- Documentation Center of Cambodia – founded in 1995 as a field office of Yale's Cambodian Genocide Program and independent since 1997
- Cambodian Genocide Databases – DC-Cam biographic (30,442 records), bibliographic (2,963), photographic (5,190 S-21 prisoner photographs) and geographic databases
- Queen Mother Library – DC-Cam reference library holding over 1.7 million pages of Khmer Rouge records and more than 100,000 hours of recorded interviews
- Bophana Audiovisual Resource Center – Phnom Penh archive of film, photographs and sound recordings on Cambodia, founded by Rithy Panh

=== Trial records ===
- Cambodia Tribunal Monitor. (Note: Trial footage, filings and commentary compiled by Northwestern University's Center for International Human Rights.)
- Extraordinary Chambers in the Courts of Cambodia. (Note: Official site of the Khmer Rouge tribunal, with case files, decisions and transcripts.)
- People's Revolutionary Tribunal held in Phnom Penh for the trial of the genocide crime of the Pol Pot – Ieng Sary clique (August 1979): Documents. (Note: The People's Republic of Kampuchea's official English-language record of the trial, published 1990.)
- United Nations Doc. A/34/491. (Note: The tribunal's judgement, sent to the Secretary-General by the Permanent Representative of Vietnam, 20 September 1979.)

== See also ==
- Cambodian genocide denial
- Cambodian Civil War
- Cambodian–Vietnamese War
- Allegations of United States support for the Khmer Rouge
- Khmer Rouge
- Democratic Kampuchea
