= List of Khmer soap operas =

Although the first Khmer TV soap opera was broadcast in 1996, the number of Cambodian soap operas rose in 2007 after Kone Prosa Srey proved a success on CTN. 85 Khmer soap operas have been broadcast between 1997 and 2012.

== 1997 ==
- Cheat Satrey (SSB CO., LTD) (CTN/Ch7)

== 1998 ==
- Bopha Pailin (MTR CO., LTD) (CTN/Ch7)

== 2003 ==
- Ngea Chea Propun Head-Wife (FCI CO., LTD) (CTN)

== 2004 ==
- Ruos Cheat Jivit (KMF CO., LTD) (Ch5)
- Srov Krao Srae (Mohahong CO., LTD) (Ch3)

== 2005 ==
- Avei Avei Knhom Tveu Daumbei Oun (KH CO, LTD) (CTN)
- Komlang Nung Veasna (KH CO, LTD) (CTN)

== 2006 ==
- Banhau Kaék (Rock CO., LTD) (CTN)
- Beh Dong Rung Kruoh (Rock CO., LTD) (CTN)
- Chet Sava (Rock CO., LTD) (CTN)
- Knung Duong Jet Mean Neakna (Spark CO., LTD) (Ch7)
- Kone Prosa Srey (Rock CO., LTD) (CTN)
- Mean Sombuk Tae Rongea (Rock/KH CO., LTD) (CTN)
- Phjus jevit yuk vak vey (Spark CO., LTD) (Ch7)
- Pjouh Jivit Yuvekvei (Spark CO., LTD) (Ch7)
- Snam Snae Samut Ream (Rock/KH CO., LTD) (CTN)
- Trung Meas Baksei Snaeh (Spark CO., LTD) (Ch7)

== 2007 ==
- After The Rain (Mohahong CO., LTD) (Ch3)
- Dung Te Ta Knhom Rung Jam Neak? (Spark CO., LTD) (Ch7)
- Jet Bun (WMC CO., LTD) (CTN)
- Kae Jet Saóp Bong (Spark CO., LTD) (Ch7)
- Ku Snae Chai Don (Classic CO., LTD) (Ch5)
- Knhom Chea Neak Na (Who Am I?) (Rock CO., LTD) (CTN)
- Majah Beh Duong (Rock CO., LTD) (CTN)
- Mon Sneah Srok Srea (FCI/Town CO., LTD) (Ch5)
- Pka Knong Pka (Rock CO., LTD) (CTN)
- Pka Maóm (Mohahong CO., LTD) (Ch7)
- Samut Tuk Sap (WMC CO., LTD) (CTN)
- Somnanh Jivit (WMC CO., LTD) (CTN)
- Tuk Pnek Jeay Daen (Rock CO., LTD) (CTN)

== 2008 ==
- The Golden Vine (Spark CO., LTD) (Ch7)
- Jomnong Sneah Jomnong Besdoung (KH CO., LTD) (CTN)
- Neang Sonita (Spark CO., LTD) (Ch7)
- Phum Sneah Cherngprey (Spark CO., LTD) (Ch7)
- Pka Reik 4 Rodov (KH CO., LTD) (CTN)
- Reachany Duong Chet (Rock CO., LTD) (CTN)
- Tngai Alai Oun (Spark CO., LTD) (Ch7)

== 2009 ==
- Duong Vitey Dara (Rock CO., LTD) (CTN)
- Jomrieng Snae Rolok Jivit (Classic CO., LTD) (Ch5)
- Junjung Kmean Sromoul (KMF CO., LTD) (Ch5)
- Mek Jah Jan Tmei (WMC CO., LTD) (CTN)
- Onloung Knong Barp (Mohahong/SSB CO., LTD) (Ch7)
- Oudom Pheakriyea (Rock CO., LTD) (CTN)
- Pesakkam Dontrei (WMC CO., LTD) (CTN)
- Peus Sneah (Mohahong/SSB CO., LTD) (Ch7)
- Pume Knhom Sros Chaut Chai (Spark CO., LTD) (Ch7)
- Tream Jet Somrap Cheu (Spark CO., LTD) (Ch7)

== 2010 ==
- Besdoung Kyom Somrap Neak Na? (Spark CO., LT) (Ch7)
- Ham Sen Mun Snea (Spark CO., LTD) (Ch7)
- Janh Jet Tbet Srolanh (Spark CO., LTD) (Ch7)
- Klen Pka Srotob 3 (Spark CO., LTD) (Ch7)
- Lamom Heuy Lok Pdey (Classic CO., LTD) (Ch5)
- Lbech Srey (Rock CO., LTD) (CTN)
- Leak Sneah Somrab Bong (Sunday CO., LTD) (Ch7)
- Oun Chea Besdoung Bong (Rock CO., LTD) (CTN)
- Phka Reik Phen Rodov (MTR CO., LTD) (Ch6)
- Rolok Somleng Part 1 (KMF CO., LTD) (CTN)
- Songkream Sneah (Mohahong CO., LTD) (Ch5)
- Tevabot Nirouk (Mohahong CO., LTD) (Ch3)
- Vimean Snea Prea Rouk (Town CO., LTD) (Ch5)

== 2011 ==
- Boross Vey Steel (Town CO., LTD) (Ch5)
- Brer Jivit Kit Dol Oun (Sunday CO., LTD) (Ch7)
- Ja'et Chet (Mohahong CO., LTD) (Ch3)
- Jiveath Youkvakvey (SON CO., LTD) (Ch6)
- Kam Loukei (Classic CO., LTD) (Ch5)
- Oundom Doung Chet (MTR/SON CO., LTD) (Ch6)
- Pourp Somnang (Rock Co., LTD) (CTN)
- Pov Chouk Sor (Town CO., LTD) (Ch5)
- Somross Jivith (KMF CO., LTD) (CTN)
- Tirk Chet Bong Srey (Rock CO., LTD) (CTN)
- Tirk Phneak Hor Khmean Neak Jout (Sunday CO., LTD) (Ch7)
- Vihean Sneah Athkombang (Sunday CO., LTD) (Ch7)

== 2012 ==
NEW WAVES FOR KHMER INDUSTRIES

- 3Seathey Vey khmeang (Classic CO., LTD) (Ch5)
- Aek Komdor Bong Sneah (Sunday CO., LTD) (Ch7)
- Besdoung Kyom Krousa Kyom (KMF CO., LTD) (CTN)
- Besdoung Neak Kaphear (Rock CO., LTD) (CTN)
- Chouk Sor Dos Leur Pouk (Town CO., LTD) (Ch5)
- Chun Atkombang - the Imposter (KMF CO., LTD) (CTN)
- Deak Somleang Jet (Sunday CO., LTD) (Ch7)
- Dechor Yorth (Punlir Preah Athit CO., LTD) (Ch6)
- Hong Antheak Sneah (SonSun CO., LTD) (Ch6)
- Jivith douch Lokear (NewMoon) (MoomMai CO., LTD) (Ch6)
- Jivith Ler Vithey (MTR CO., LTD) (Ch6)
- Komloss Leur Ker (Town CO., LTD) (Ch5)
- Kompoul DoungJet (SonSun/MTR CO., LTD) (Ch6)
- Majaus Komnum Maujaus Sneah (Mohahong CO., LTD) (Ch5)
- Moha Tikun (Sunday CO., LTD) (Ch7)
- Nisai Sneah Pi Jeat (Rock CO., LTD) (CTN)
- Obataheat Sneah (Mohahong CO., LTD) (Ch5)
- Pesakakam Kumpoul Sneah 3 Dourng (Town CO., LTD) (Ch5)
- Pich Knong Besdoung (Mohahong CO., LTD) (Ch5)
- Pkha Reak Knong Jet (Rock CO., LTD) (CTN)
- Preah Athit Reas Knong Seoul (HANSON CO., LTD) (Ch7)
- Prumden Bondoul Jet Sneah (SUNDAY/SPARK CO., LTD) (Ch7)
- Reachany Panjapor (Punlir Preah Athit CO., LTD) (Ch6)
- Soben Yukvakvey (KMF CO., LTD) (CTN)

== 2013 ==
3D Khmer Soap Opera

- Kon Et Khan Sla (Rock CO., LTD) (CTN)

- Neak Mean Kun (Rock CO., LTD) (CTN)

== See also ==
- Mass media in Cambodia
- List of Khmer entertainment companies
- List of Khmer film actors
- List of Khmer film directors
- List of Khmer films
