= List of Cambodian films =

This is an incomplete, chronological list of films produced in the Khmer language. Most films are related to the Cinema of Cambodia, but also included are films partly produced in other countries but still retaining Cambodian links.

For an alphabetical listing, see Category:Cambodian films. Not all Cambodian films are listed and many of the films produced between 1965 and 1975 were destroyed during the Khmer Rouge years.

== 1960s ==
- Kbone Chivet (1962)...Madam Dy Saveth 1st film
- Chet Madai (1963) oldest existing Khmer film discovered as of 2009
- Apsara (1965)...King Sihanouk's 1st film
- Pao Chouk Sar (1967)
- Puthisen Neang Kangrey (1967)
- Tep Sodachan(1968)
- Thavary Meas Bong (1969)

== 1970s ==
- Sovann Pancha (1970)...known as Vann Vannak's only surviving film
- The Snake King's Wife (1970) The most popular Cambodian movie of all time directed by Tea Lim Koun and was released in Cambodia for a second term The Snake King's Wife Part 2 in 1972.
- Kropeu Charavan (1972)
- Orn Euy Srey Orn (1972)
- Pko Lon Deum Chnam (1972)
- Pel Dael Trov Yum (1972)
- Panjapor Tevi (1973)
- Chnam Oun 16 (1974)-known for the famous Rock and Roll song "Sweet 16" by Ros Serey Sothea
- Pous Trung Oun Tov (1975)-known as the last existing Khmer film before the Khmer Rouge

== 1980s ==
- Kone Euy Madai Ahp (1980 or 1984)
- Chet Chang Cham (1984)
- Tears In A Quiet Purple Evening (1987)...Tep Rundaro's debut film

== 1990s ==
- Blank Page (1991) - Directed by Hồ Quang Minh
- Last Colonel Savath (1992)
- Rice People (1994)
- Peasants In Distress (1994)
- Promat Promaong (1994)
- Picheyvongsa (1996)
- Jeat Satrey (1997)...Cambodia's 1st acknowledged TV series and Pich Soporn's last film
- Bopha Pailin (1998)...Chorn Chan Leakenna debut film

== 2000s ==
- Techo Domden (2000)
- The Snake King's Child (2001)...Internationally known sequel to the 1970 film, a joint production between Cambodia and Thailand
- Cheam Anata (2002)...Actors Chea Yuthon and Saom Vansodany's life during the Khmer Rouge
- Tuk Jet Mdai (2002)...Dy Saveth returns to acting for the first time in a long time
- Min Yoke Te Pdei Jass, Saóp Nass Pdei Kmeng (2003)
- Tum and Teav (2003)
- Good Husband/Pdey Laór (2003)
- 3 Ace (2004)
- Ah Lev (2004)
- Neang Neat (2004)
- Moronak Meada (2004)
- Mr. Mao (2005)
- Neang Macha (2005)
- The Blind and the Crippled (2005)
- The Crocodile (2005)
- Mjass Bomnul Kam (2006)
- The Snake King's Grandchild (2006)
- Staying Single When (2007)...KMF's 1st featured film
- Heart Talk (2008)
- Pume Neak Klahan (2009)
- The Twin Diamonds (2009)

== 2010s ==
- Lost Loves (2010)
- Kiles (2010)
- Two Shadows (2011)
- The Uninvited Ancestor (2011)
- The Road to Freedom (2011) (US Film)
- Techoyut (2012)
- Red Khmer (2013) Directed by Brendan Moriarty
- Where I Go (2013) Directed by Neang Kavich
- The Last Reel (2014) Directed by Kulikar Sotho
- Poppy Goes to Hollywood (2016) Directed by Sok Visal
- Diamond Island (2016) Directed by Davy Chou
- Jailbreak (2017) Directed by Jimmy Henderson
- Chantrea (2017)
- Kamnat Het Neang Neath (2017) Cambodia's Horror movie
- Luong Preah Sdach Korn ហ្លួងព្រះស្តេចកន (2017) Directed by Moav Ayouth
- First They Killed My Father (film) (2017) Directed by Angelina Jolie
- In the Life of Music (2018)
- The Clock: Spirits Awakening (2019)

== 2020s ==
- Fathers (2020)
- Karmalink (2023)
- Wishing Lollipop

== See also ==
- List of Khmer Soap Operas
- List of Khmer entertainment companies
- List of Khmer film actors
- List of Khmer film directors
