= Cinema of Cambodia =

- No. of screens: 25 (2023)
  - Per capita: 0.1 per 100,000 (2011)
- Main distributors: Reasmei Peanmeas 35.0% Westech Media 30.0% Sunday 11.0%

Produced feature films (2005-2009)
- Total: 38 (average)

Cinema in Cambodia began in the 1950s, and many films were being screened in theaters throughout the country by the 1960s, which were regarded as the "golden age". After a near-disappearance during the Khmer Rouge regime, competition from video and television has meant that the Cambodian film industry is a small one.

== History ==
=== The early years ===
As early as 1899, short documentary films were shot in Cambodia by foreign filmmakers. By the 1930s, King Norodom Sihanouk had a desire for films and dreamed of stardom before the French chose him to be king. Even after his selection, he kept in mind the idea of acting or directing. The first Cambodian-made films were made in the 1950s by filmmakers who had studied overseas. They included Roeum Sophon, Ieu Pannakar and Sun Bun Ly. The United States Information Service held training workshops during this era and provided equipment. One film from this time was Dan Prean Lbas Prich (Footprints of the Hunter), made by off-duty Cambodian military personnel using American equipment and containing footage of Cambodian hill tribes.

Sun Bun Ly's first film was Kar Pear Prumjarei Srei Durakut (Protect Virginity). He also established the first private production company, Ponleu Neak Poan Kampuchea. His success inspired others, such as Ly Bun Yim, to try their hand.

=== The golden age ===
In the 1960s, several production companies were started and more movie theaters were built throughout the country. This was the "golden age" of Cambodian cinema, when more than 300 movies were made. Movie tickets were relatively affordable and Cambodian-made movies were popular with all classes in Cambodia. Movie-lovers favored movies featuring traditional Cambodian legends. At the time, about two-thirds of the films released were boran (films of legends). Among the classic films of this period are Lea Haey Duong Dara (Goodbye Duong Dara) and Pos Keng Kang (The Snake King's Wife) by Tea Lim Kun. Other films followed, such as Crocodile Man, The Snake King's Wife Part 2, The Snake girl and My Mother is Arb. These films found success both in Cambodia and abroad.

During the Golden Age, some Cambodian films were released abroad. and during the 1970s they were well received internationally. Pos Keng Kang, a Khmer Horror period, was a big hit in Thailand, and Crocodile Man (1974) was screened successfully in Hong Kong. Such successes opened the way for foreign screenings of Khmer films such as Puthisean Neang Kong rey and The Snake Girl. Stars during this era included actress Vichara Dany, who made hundreds of films but lost her life during the Khmer Rouge regime.

The star of Pos Keng Kang, actress Dy Saveth, escaped Cambodia during the Khmer Rouge rule. She has returned to act in films and to teach at Royal University of Phnom Penh. A leading man of the era was action star Chea Yuthon, and his mistress Saom Vansodany was a famous actress of the sixties and seventies. Their son Thorn Tharith made an autobiographical drama, Chheam Anatha (The Blood of An Orphan), about the family's struggles during the Khmer Rouge time. Kong Sam Oeurn and Van Vanak are other famous leading actors of the era. They are believed to have perished under the communist regime.

Sihanouk (then a prince) also made films, which he wrote, directed and produced himself. They were mostly romantic melodramas with an underlying social message. A cinema fan since his student days in Saigon in the 1930s, he released his first feature, Apsara, on August 8, 1966. He made eight more films during the next three years, serving as producer, director, writer, composer and star. His other films during this period include Ombre Sur Angkor (1967), Rose de Bokor, Crepuscule (Twilight) (1969) and Joie de vivre. His 1967 film Spellbound Wood was entered into the 5th Moscow International Film Festival.

=== Khmer Rouge and the Communist era ===
In the years leading up to the takeover by the Khmer Rouge, refugees crowded the cities and movie-going remained extremely popular. Among the films at this time were the love-triangle melodrama On srey On and The Time to Cry. Both films featured the music of popular Cambodian singer Sinn Sisamouth.

The industry's decline began in late 1974, when the fall of Phnom Penh to the Khmer Rouge was imminent. After the Khmer Rouge takeover, the cities were depopulated and film audiences shrank. The Khmer Rouge itself made some propaganda films to screen at collective meetings, and diplomatic visits were recorded on film.

With the invasion of Cambodia by Vietnam, the fall of the Khmer Rouge and the installation of the Vietnam-backed government of the People's Republic of Kampuchea, movie houses in Phnom Penh were re-opened, but there was no domestic film industry, because many filmmakers and actors from the 1960s and 1970s had been killed by the Khmer Rouge or had fled the country. Negatives and prints of many films were destroyed, stolen, or missing. Many of the films that did survive are in poor condition, as there has been no effort at preservation.

Cinema in Cambodia at this time consisted of films from Vietnam, the Soviet Union, East European socialist countries and Hindi movies from India; films from other nations, such as Hong Kong action cinema, were banned. Audiences soon tired of the socialist realism and class struggle depicted in the films.

Cambodia's film industry began a slow comeback starting with My Mother is Arb (or Krasue Mom), a horror movie based on Khmer folklore and the first movie made in Cambodia after the Khmer Rouge era. Cambodian production companies began to re-emerge and tread the fine line of making films that would entertain people without incurring the wrath of the government. Films from this period, such as Chet Chorng Cham (Reminding the Mind) and Norouk Pramboun Chaon (Nine Levels of Hell), told stories about the miseries endured under the Khmer Rouge, or about lives under the Vietnam-backed regime. Soon there were more than 200 production companies making films that competed for screenings at 30 cinemas in Phnom Penh.

The boom in filmmaking was curtailed, however, by the introduction of VCRs, video cameras and importation of taped foreign television programs, including Thai soap operas.

=== Slow comeback ===
From 1990 to 1994, hundreds of local Cambodian movies were released every year. The majority of films released at the time were all made in 1993, during the time of the United Nations Transitional Authority in Cambodia (UNTAC). The period of plenty ended in 1994 due to the governments demand over Cambodian movies being incomparable to foreign films. In 1995, most Cambodian production turned to karaoke, and by 1996, HD cameras had become widely available in Cambodia. Since the early 1990s, the local industry has started a slow comeback.

One sign of progress is the career of French-trained director Rithy Panh, who escaped Cambodia after seeing his family die under the Khmer Rouge. His films focus on the aftermath of the Khmer Rouge. One is the docudrama Rice People (1994), which competed at the 1994 Cannes Film Festival and was submitted to the 67th Academy Awards for Best Foreign Language Film, the first time a Cambodian film had been submitted for an Oscar.

Unlike other diaspora filmmakers, Cambodian filmmaker-producer Chhay Bora lives and works full-time in Cambodia. His recent drama Lost Loves was submitted for a 2013 Oscar for Best Foreign Language Film.

In 2001, Fai Sam Ang directed Kon pous keng kang (The Snake King's Child), a remake of a classic 1960s Cambodian film. Though it was a Thai co-production, starring Thai leading man Winai Kraibutr, it was recognized as the first Cambodian film to be released since before the Khmer Rouge era. At the time, Phnom Penh did not yet have any viable commercial cinemas, so the film was screened at the French Cultural Center in Phnom Penh and in outdoor screenings, as well as in a widespread commercial release in Thailand cinemas.

The 2003 Phnom Penh riots, prompted by a newspaper article that falsely quoted Thai actress Suvanant Kongying as saying that Cambodia had stolen Angkor, resulted in a ban on all Thai films and television programs. To fill the large gap in programming, a resurgence in Cambodian film and TV production began.

=== Recent developments ===
A national film festival was held in November 2005. Many of the films shown were locally made low-budget horror films such as Lady Vampire, which depicts the krasue, a ghostly flying female head with internal organs dangling beneath it. Lady Vampire and Ghost Banana Tree were the hit horror films since the resurgence of the Cambodian film industry. The trophy for best movie went to The Crocodile, a tale of the heroism of a man who killed the beast responsible for the deaths of several people in his village. It starred Cambodian pop singer Preap Sovath and veteran actress Dy Saveth. The Second prize went to a legendary Khmer fantasy film, Moranak Meada, and the third was won by the true-life drama Gratefulness.

Other recent films include Tum Teav, a 16th- and 18th-century Cambodian folktale, and A Mother's Heart and Who Am I?, both by Pan Phuong Bopha, one of the first working female writer-directors in Cambodia. She started her career in 1989 with horror and romance movies before achieving success with Who Am I?, who became a "blockbuster" in Cambodia and was appreciated abroad. Another notable female Cambodian director is Lida Chan, who specializes in films and documentaries about the Khmer Rouge, and achieved success in 2012 with the award-winning Red Wedding.

The creation of the Cambodia Film Commission in 2009 by the Agence Française de Développement (AFD) and Film France, under the observation of the Ministry of Culture and Fine Arts, offers new possibilities for filmmakers to explore Cambodia's numerous film-worthy locations. However, the Cinema and Cultural Diffusion Department, the official office of the Ministry of Culture and Fine Arts, remains the official first point of contact for foreign producers seeking permits and filming information in Cambodia.

In middle of 2011, Phnom Penh started to see a major change in the cinema scene. Two major malls opened up cinema outlets offering international films in English with Khmer subtitles.

Cambodia's first science fiction film Karmalink was released in 2023.

== Foreign films made in Cambodia ==
Cambodia's Angkor Wat was the location for the filming of 1965's Lord Jim, starring Peter O'Toole, but it was not until the early 21st century that foreign filmmakers made their return to the country.

The best-known depiction of Cambodia during the Khmer Rouge years, The Killing Fields (1984), starring the Cambodian actor Haing S. Ngor as journalist Dith Pran, was in fact made in neighboring Thailand.

Since the reopening of Cambodia to international tourism, high-profile directors such as Oliver Stone, Steven Spielberg and director/producer Brendan Moriarty have scouted Cambodia for locations. The 2001 action blockbuster Lara Croft: Tomb Raider was shot on location around Angkor, and its star, Angelina Jolie, became so enamored of the country that she adopted a Cambodian boy named Maddox and lived there for a time. Other films shot on location around Angkor include Wong Kar-wai's In the Mood for Love (which also includes film footage of the 1966 visit of Charles de Gaulle to Phnom Penh) and Two Brothers by Jean-Jacques Annaud in 2003. Matt Dillon's 2002 drama, City of Ghosts, was filmed in many locations around the country, including Phnom Penh and the Bokor Hill Station. Moriarty's war film The Road to Freedom was filmed entirely in Cambodia in the summer of 2009 and had limited release in cinemas in 2011. It tells the story of Sean and Dana, war photographers in Cambodia during the Khmer Rouge regime in the 1970s.

Since 2009, the Cambodia Film Commission has set up a training program to allow foreign productions to work with a local crew familiar with international standards. Since 2009 there has been a significant inflow of foreign productions filming in Cambodia. The Ministry of Culture and Fine Arts has facilitated a number of projects from Europe, USA, Australia, Asia. The Kingdom now offers professional equipment within the country, and an increasing number of skilled Cambodian professionals for set construction, wardrobe, grips and lighting.

In 2016, Angelina Jolie directed First They Killed My Father, adapted from Lung Ung's book's memory of the Khmer Rouge Era. The film produced by Netflix was shot entirely in Cambodia in collaboration with Rithy Panh. The film was submitted as the Cambodian submission for the 90th Academy Awards.

== Horror genre increasing ==
In recent years, horror films made on a low budget with weak special effects have become popular, especially with young audiences. A Cambodian horror film will generally feature a ghost story, old mythology and some form of revenge. Krasue is a popular subject. Films featuring ghost stories, mythology and blood rituals include Ghost Banana Tree and The Kantong Kiev Witch. Another horror film, The Haunted House, is loosely based on legend.

Cambodian horror films focus on their characters' suffering and (unlike Korean horror or Japanese horror) feature extreme gory violence. Popular horror films such as The Weird Villa and Secret Well emphasize psychological terror. Heart Talk is another psychological thriller.

Films about revenge, such as Villa Horror, Annoyed and Moheagita, often feature the dead returning to life to exact revenge on the living.

Films about monsters include The Forest, Queen of Cobra and People eating Lizard. Cambodian monster films, like those from Hollywood, focus on teenagers. Some are similar to slasher films, involving a creature or a killer who stalks and graphically murders a series of mostly adolescent victims in a typically random, unprovoked fashion, killing many within a single night. The plot of the first slasher film for Cambodia screen, The Waterfall of Death has similarities to the murder thriller I Know What You Did Last Summer and Thai psychological thriller Scared.

Despite the current taste for horror movies, Heng Tola believes a more serious trend is emerging, prompted in part by the resentment many Cambodians feel about its colonial past and toward powerful neighbors such as Thailand and Vietnam.

The Third Khmer film festival, which took place in late 2007, banned the ghost films as a reaction to the glut of horror movies.

== Recent decline ==
By the end of 2007, audience numbers had begun to decline, and theaters and film production companies began closing down. Only 13 theaters were still operating, compared to the 30 between 1965 and 1975. Critics blamed the decline on weak acting and directing, along with poor scripts and storylines. Poor enforcement of intellectual property in Cambodia also continues to impact the country's credibility in the local and international media trade.

In 2009 the number of films released decreased from more than 60 in 2006 to less than 10, and most film directors turned to producing short films and television series rather than full movies as they had before.

Many locally made films are simple and similar low budget horror and love stories. Many Cambodians prefer international films of better quality, especially as their tickets are usually cheaper than for domestic films. Yet many Cambodians would like to see domestic films if they could reach the standard of those produced during the industry's height.

== Notable films ==
- Tep Sodachan (1968)
- Thavory Meas Bong (1960s)
- Prea Bopear Kon (The Ghost with baby) (196?)
- Prea Krola Plak (The fire burn witch) (197?)
- Pos Keng Kang (The Snake King's Wife) (1971)
- Kraithong Kropaer Charawan (The Crocodile Man) (1971)
- Pos Keng Kang 2 (The Snake King's Wife 2) (1972)
- See Angkor and Die (1993)
- An Euil Srey An (1972)
- Preay Kontung Khiev (1972)
- Preay Kontung Khiev (1973)
- Chompa Toung (1974)
- Pramath Pramong (The Children Killer) (1974)
- Kuon Euy Madai Ahp (1980)
- Beisach Kromom (1994)
- Promatt Promong (1994)
- Rice People (1994)
- One Evening After the War (1998)
- The Land of the Wandering Souls (2000)
- The Snake King's Child (2001)
- Kohak Kmorch Tek Snech Asara Peak (The Spirit under the water and snaker's love) (2003)
- Konom Sneah Prea Krala Plak (The Triangle Love Ghost) (2003)
- The Weird Villa (2003)
- S-21: The Khmer Rouge Killing Machine (2003)
- Tum Teav (2003)
- The Enternal Love (2004)
- Neang Neath (2004)
- Nieng Arp (2004)
- Burn The Witch (2004)
- Neang Pomiry (2004)
- The Weird Villa (2004)
- The Crocodile (2005)
- Chalawan Return (The Crocodile Man 3) (2005)
- Human or Ghost (2005)
- Kmorch Neang Tey (2005)
- The Ghost Hut (2005)
- Kmorch Prea Asoryka (2005)
- Myea Tola Mekong (2005)
- Prei Tak Hong (2005)
- The Snake King's Grandchild (2005)
- Moheachata (ambition) (2005)
- Ghost Banana Tree (2005)
- The Forest (2005)
- The Haunted House (2005)
- The Burnt Theatre (2005)
- Neang Poun (2006)
- Sopeal Sok Tom (2005)
- Vichean (Soul) (2005)
- Boremei Preah Barima Meas (2005)
- Vegence (2005)
- The Red Sense (2006)
- Min Maya (Love Charm)
- Neang Pbuon (2006)
- The Game (2006)
- Jnea Kmorch (2006)
- The Konthong Keav Witch (2006)
- Villa Horror (2006)
- Van Chenk Kon (Killing Pagoda) (2006)
- Kmorch Pdea Deam (Ghost of Pass Mother) (2006)
- Kmorch Lok Praleung (2006)
- Shock 24 Hours (2006)
- The Killing Phone (2006)
- Human Or Ghost (2006)
- Bankouy Si Moneah (2007)
- The Blue Moon (2007)
- Rajiny Pous (Queen Of Cobra) (2007)
- Promatt Promomg (2007)
- Boremei Jumneang Ptess (2007)
- Niseak Sneah Pi Cheat Mon
- Tiyen Arp (Heretiy of Krasue) (2007)
- Niyeat Pous (2007)
- The Waterfall of Death (2007)
- Staying Single When (2007)
- Secret Well (2007)
- The Death of water fall (2007)
- Chon Tem Kan Kmorch (Stop, Shooting a Ghost Film) (2008)
- Heart Talk (2008)
- Prea Pous (Spiritual of Snake) (2008)
- Liaek Kom Prolung (Spiritual Cave) (2008)
- Vijean Sneah (Love Soul) (2008)
- Annoyed (2008)
- Who Am I? (2009)
- Arb Kalum 2009 (The Sexilest Krasue in 2009) (2009)
- Lost Love (2010)
- 25 Years Old Girl (2012)
- First Love (2012)
- Fool in Love (2012)
- I am Super Student (2013)
- Hanuman (2015)
- Jailbreak (2017)
- First They Killed My Father (2017)
- The Clock: Spirits Awakening (2019)
- Karmalink (2021)

== See also ==
- List of Khmer film
- Communications in Cambodia
- Media of Cambodia
- Cinema of the world
