= The Prey (2018 film) =

- Movie poster of The Prey for English speaking audiences
- Directed by: Jimmy Henderson
- Starring: Vithaya Pansringarm; Dy Sonita; Reth Tiger
- Distributed by: Netflix
- Release date: 2018
- Running time: 87 minutes
- Country: Cambodia
- Language: English

The Prey is a 2018 US-Cambodian film directed and written by Jimmy Henderson and "trumpeted as Cambodia’s first million-dollar action movie".

== Synopsis ==
Xin, an undercover Interpol operative who is investigating a phone scam that is spreading in China and seems to be based in Phnom Penh. When Cambodian Police raids the operation’s headquarter and arrest everybody, Xin has to go along with it in order to keep his cover. The bunch of arrested criminals are sent to a forgotten prison at the border, governed by a ruthless and sadistic warden. Xin manages to send a signal to his boss in Beijing, just in time before being labeled as a trouble-maker and consequently sent with a group of other unlucky fellow prisoners to a mysterious mission in the jungle.

== Reception ==
The Prey debuted at the Busan International Film Festival in 2018. The Prey has been described as a "scrappy yet satisfying low-budget action movie in a country where the genre has been all but nonexistent."

It was Jimmy Henderson's second collaboration which Dy Sonita, since Jailbreak, which sent the latter into stardom in Cambodia.

The film which includes many fights scenes was appreciated for its support in preserving the fighting art of bokator.

== Cast ==
The movie has a multi-national cast of actors and actresses from Cambodia, Thailand and China.

- Gu Shangwei as Xin
- Reth Tiger as Stunt Man
- Vithaya Pansringarm
- Byron Bishop
- Nophand Boonyai
- Rous Mony
- Dy Sonita
