= D.Y. Sao =

Cambodian-American martial artist and actor

- Born: Dyra Sao; 1979 (age 46–47); Battambang, Cambodia
- Occupations: Actor; martial artist; stunt performer; producer
- Years active: 2003–present
- Height: 5 ft 6 in (168 cm)

Dyra Sao (born 1979) also known as D.Y. Sao, is a Cambodian-American actor, martial artist, stunt performer, and producer. His film credits include The Prey (2018), Jailbreak (2017), and Gladiator Underground (2025).

== Early life and education ==
D.Y. Sao was born in Battambang, Cambodia, in 1979. During the Khmer Rouge civil war. His sister Dary was born in a refugee camp in Manila, Philippines, and the family later moved to Long Beach, California. Sao became interested in martial arts as a child and practiced by copying Bruce Lee and Donnie Yen, but his father could not afford to pay for lessons at a local martial arts school.

Sao studied psychology at the University of California, Irvine, and graduated in 2003.

== Career ==
=== Competitive wushu ===
Sao with his sister started taking wushu taolu classes in 2000 at the Southern California under Chris Ho. Sao could barely afford lessons, so instead of payment, he was tasked with completing chores in his wushu school. With only three years of training, he competed in the 2003 US Wushu Team Trials and placed on the A Team. Sao then competed at the 2003 World Wushu Championships in Macau and placed 17th in changquan and 6th in daoshu, the highest by any American male athlete at the competition.

=== Acting Career ===
After competitive wushu. Sao began his career in film as a stunt performer and fight choreographer. His early credits include stunt work on Break and Kamen Rider: Dragon Knight, as well as fight choreography for Champion Road: Arena. He later worked as a stunt coordinator on Jungle Justice and Tokyo Ghoul: Re - Anime.

Sao started gaining more acting roles in early 2010s. Some of his appearances in short films include Feel the Music in 2014, In 2017 he starred in The Block, and Jack and Jill in 2018.

In 2021 Sao was cast as Shen Long in the action film, Fast Vengeance alongside DMX. He also played as Voaen the lead character in the film Shadow Master in 2022. Sao continued working with stunts and action departments. He did utility stunts for Shang-Chi and the Legend of the Ten Rings and stunt work for Everything Everywhere All at Once.

In 2024, Sao starred in the action film Bangkok Dog, in which he played Andrew Kang, and also served as the producer and action director.

In 2025 he was cast as Max Yen in Gladiator Underground.

== Filmography ==
=== Film ===
| Year | Title | Role |
|---|---|---|
| 2003 | Cradle 2 the Grave | Background extra |
| 2009 | Art of War | Asian warrior |
| 2010 | War Machine | White Ninja |
| 2010 | Broken Blade | Ryu Hitana |
| 2013 | How War Ends | Rithy |
| 2013 | 5th Street | Lee |
| 2014 | Feel the Music | Michael |
| 2021 | Fast Vengeance | Shen Long |
| 2022 | Shadow Master | An Voaen |
| 2022 | Everything Everywhere All at Once | Chinese Choir |
| 2022 | True American Violence | Richie |
| 2023 | Til Death Do Us Part | Groomsman 1 |
| 2024 | Bangkok Dog | Andrew Kang |
| 2024 | Batman Beyond: Year One | Flush Gang Henchman |
| 2025 | Gladiator Underground | Max Yen |

=== Television ===
| Year | Title | Role |
|---|---|---|
| 2015 | 1/4 Mermaid | Sy |
| 2021–2024 | Marvel Studios: Assembled | Himself |

=== Short films ===
| Year | Title | Role |
|---|---|---|
| 2017 | The Block | Officer Xiang / Patron |
| 2017 | Cactus | — |
| 2018 | Jack and Jill | Officer R. Man |
| 2018 | The Most Interesting Man in Show Business | Charles Lo |
| 2025 | Shaolin Avengers | — |
| 2026 | Child of the Rouge | Lieutenant |
| — | Serpentine | Fang |
| — | Gladstone | Jack Ripper |

=== Stunt work ===
| Year | Title | Role |
|---|---|---|
| 2008 | Break | Stunt performer |
| 2009 | On the Edge | Stunt performer; fight choreographer |
| 2009–2010 | Kamen Rider: Dragon Knight | Stunt performer |
| 2010 | Champion Road: Arena | Fight choreographer |
| 2014 | Feel the Music | Fight choreographer |
| 2015 | The Scuttlebutt Assassins | Fight choreographer |
| 2015 | Jungle Justice | Stunt coordinator |
| 2017 | Cactus | Assistant stunt coordinator |
| 2018 | Tokyo Ghoul: Re - Anime | Stunt coordinator |
| 2020 | Breakarate | Additional stunt performer |
| 2021 | Shang-Chi and the Legend of the Ten Rings | Utility stunts |
| 2022 | Everything Everywhere All at Once | Additional stunt performer |
| 2022 | Shadow Master | Stunt coordinator |
| 2024 | Bangkok Dog | Action director; fight choreographer |
| — | Serpentine | Stunt performer; action director |
| — | Gladstone | Stunt coordinator; action coordinator |

=== Producer ===
| Year | Title | Role |
|---|---|---|
| 2016 | Vici | Consulting producer |
| 2022 | True American Violence | Executive producer |
| 2024 | Bangkok Dog | Producer |
| — | The Fifth Hour of the Night | Producer |
