= Cinema of Asia =

Asian cinema refers to the film industries and films produced in the continent of Asia.

East Asian cinema is typified by the cinema of Japan, China, Hong Kong, Taiwan and South Korea, including the Japanese anime industry and action films of Hong Kong.

Southeast Asian cinema includes the Philippines, Thailand, Indonesia, and other Southeast Asian countries.

South Asian cinema is typified by the cinema of India, the cinema of Pakistan, the cinema of Bangladesh, and the cinema of Nepal.

The cinema of Central Asia also includes the cinema of Tajikistan. West Asian cinema is typified by Arab cinema, Iranian cinema, Israeli cinema (which may overlap with Jewish cinema), and Turkish cinema.

== History ==
=== Precursors of film ===
A 5,200-year-old earthen bowl found in Shahr-i Sokhta, Iran, has five images of a goat painted along the sides. This is believed to be an example of early animation.

=== Silent film era (1890s–1920s) ===
Early Japanese horror shorts included Bake Jizo (Jizo the Spook) and Shinin no Sosei (Resurrection of a Corpse), both dated 1898. In 1898, Hiralal Sen filmed a scene from the stage production The Flower of Persia.

In the early 1900s, Israeli silent movies were screened in sheds, cafes and other temporary structures. In 1905, Cafe Lorenz opened on Jaffa Road in the Jewish neighborhood of Neve Tzedek. From 1909, the Lorenz family began screening movies at the cafe. In 1925, the Kessem Cinema was housed there for a short time. The Life Story of Tasuke Shiobara (1912) is considered Japan's first feature film. It was followed by India's first feature-length silent film, the period piece drama Raja Harishchandra (1913), by Dadasaheb Phalke, considered the father of Indian cinema.

In the 1920s, the newborn Soviet cinema was the most radically innovative. There, the craft of editing, especially, surged forward, going beyond its previous role in advancing a story. Sergei Eisenstein perfected the technique of so-called dialectical or intellectual montage, which strove to make non-linear, often violently clashing, images express ideas and provoke emotional and intellectual reactions in the viewer.

=== Early sound era (1930s) ===
Sound films began being produced in Asia from the 1930s. Notable early talkies from the cinema of Japan included Kenji Mizoguchi's Sisters of the Gion (Gion no shimai, 1936), Osaka Elegy (1936) and The Story of the Last Chrysanthemums (1939), along with Sadao Yamanaka's Humanity and Paper Balloons (1937) and Mikio Naruse's Wife, Be Like A Rose! (Tsuma Yo Bara No Yoni, 1935), which was one of the first Japanese films to gain a theatrical release in the U.S. However, with increasing censorship, the left-leaning tendency films of directors such as Daisuke Ito also began to come under attack. An early Japanese sound feature was Kenji Mizoguchi's Fujiwara Yoshie no furusato (1930), a part-talkie that used the Mina Talkie System. In 1935, Yasujirō Ozu also directed An Inn in Tokyo, considered a precursor to the neorealism genre.

Ardeshir Irani released Alam Ara, the first Indian talking film, on March 14, 1931. Following the inception of 'talkies' in India some film stars were highly sought after and earned comfortable incomes through acting. As sound technology advanced the 1930s saw the rise of music in Indian cinema with musicals such as Indra Sabha and Devi Devyani marking the beginning of song-and-dance in India's films. Studios emerged across major cities such as Chennai, Kolkata and Mumbai as filmmaking became an established craft by 1935, exemplified by the success of Devdas, which had managed to enthrall audiences nationwide.

=== Golden Age (1940s–1960s) ===
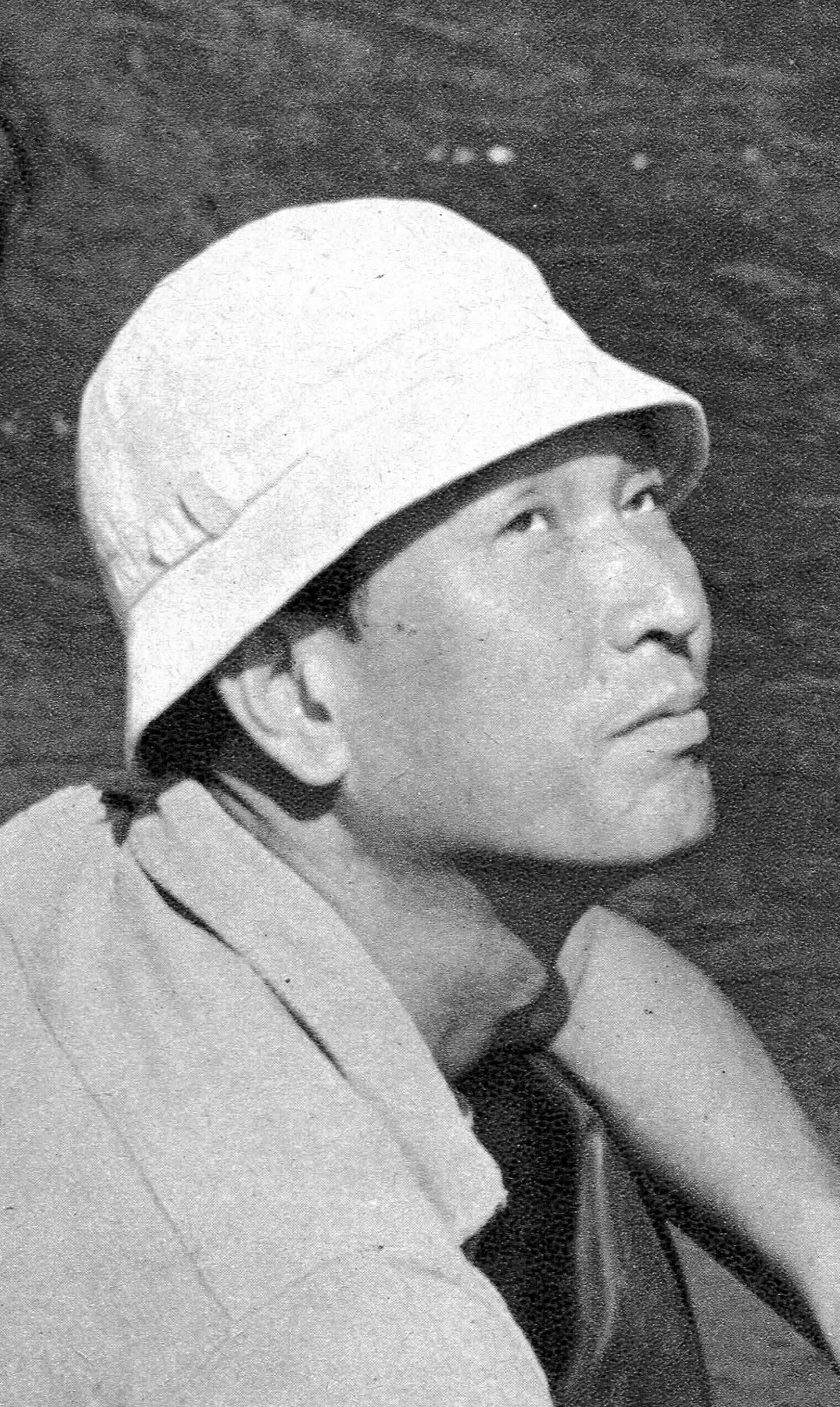
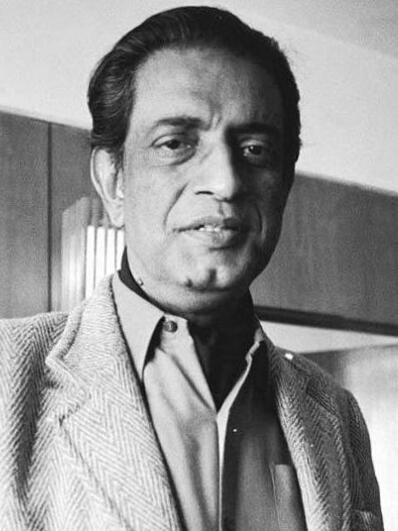
Akira Kurosawa and Satyajit Ray, two of the most acclaimed filmmakers from the Golden Age of Asian cinema.

Japanese and Indian art films gained greater visibility in North America during the 1950s and early 1960s. Many of the most critically acclaimed Asian films of all time were produced during this period, including Yasujirō Ozu's Late Spring (1949) and Tokyo Story (1953); Akira Kurosawa's Rashomon (1950), Ikiru (1952), Seven Samurai (1954) and Throne of Blood (1957); Kenji Mizoguchi's The Life of Oharu (1952), Ugetsu (1953) and Sansho the Bailiff (1954); Satyajit Ray's The Apu Trilogy (1955–1959), The Music Room (1958) and Charulata (1964); Guru Dutt's Pyaasa (1957) and Kaagaz Ke Phool (1959); and Fei Mu's Spring in a Small Town (1948), Raj Kapoor's Awaara (1951), Mikio Naruse's Floating Clouds (1955), Mehboob Khan's Mother India (1957), and Ritwik Ghatak's Subarnarekha (1965).

During Japanese cinema's 'Golden Age' of the 1950s and 1960s, successful films included Rashomon (1950), Seven Samurai (1954) and The Hidden Fortress (1958) by Akira Kurosawa, as well as Yasujirō Ozu's Tokyo Story (1953) and Ishirō Honda's Godzilla (1954). These films have had a profound influence on world cinema. Kurosawa's Seven Samurai was remade as the western The Magnificent Seven (1960) and influenced films including Sholay (1975) and Battle Beyond the Stars (1980). Rashomon was also remade as The Outrage (1964), and inspired films with "Rashomon effect" storytelling methods, such as Andha Naal (1954), The Usual Suspects (1995) and Hero (2002). The Hidden Fortress was also the inspiration behind George Lucas' Star Wars (1977). The Japanese New Wave began in the late 1950s and continued into the 1960s. Other famous Japanese filmmakers from this period include Kenji Mizoguchi, Mikio Naruse, Hiroshi Inagaki and Nagisa Oshima.

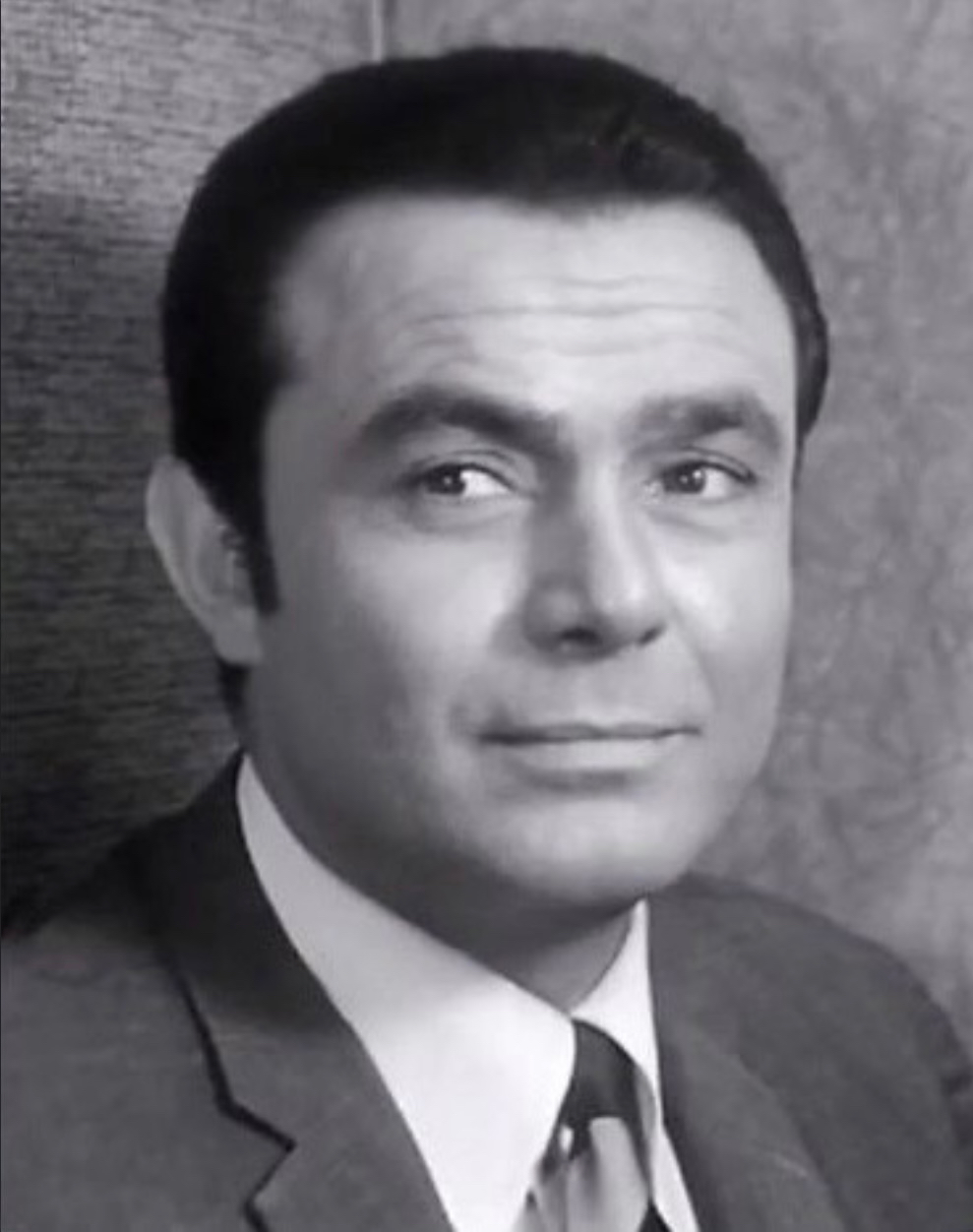
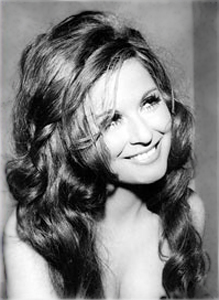
Salah Zulfikar and Soad Hosny, stars of Egyptian cinema and Arab cinema, which are considered part of West Asian cinema.

Indian independent films gained greater recognition through international film festivals during the 1950s and 1960s. One of the most famous was The Apu Trilogy (1955–1959) from critically acclaimed Bengali film director Satyajit Ray, whose films had a profound influence on world cinema, with filmmakers including Martin Scorsese, James Ivory, Ira Sachs and Wes Anderson acknowledging his influence. According to Michael Sragow of The Atlantic Monthly, the "youthful coming-of-age dramas that have flooded art houses since the mid-fifties owe a tremendous debt to the Apu trilogy". Subrata Mitra's cinematographic technique of bounce lighting also originates from The Apu Trilogy. The Parallel Cinema movement developed around films financed by the Film Finance Corporation in the late 1960s and reached its height in the 1970s. Other famous Indian filmmakers from this period include Guru Dutt, Ritwik Ghatak, Mrinal Sen, Bimal Roy, K. Asif and Mehboob Khan.

The cinema of China experienced a 'Golden Age' in the late 1940s. In 1946, Cai Chusheng returned to Shanghai to revive the Lianhua name as the "Lianhua Film Society." This in turn became Kunlun Studios which would go on to become one of the most important Chinese studios of the era, putting out the classics, Myriads of Lights (1948), The Spring River Flows East (1947), and Crows and Sparrows (1949). Wenhua's romantic drama Spring in a Small Town (1948), a film by director Fei Mu shortly prior to the revolution, is often regarded by Chinese film critics as one of the most important films in the history of Chinese cinema, with it placing first in the Hong Kong Film Awards' 2005 poll of the best Chinese films.

The cinema of Malaysia flourished in the 1950s and 1960s, a period described as its golden age. Its studio-based production had begun before the Second World War, with Cathay Productions and Shaw Brothers dominant by 1940.

The late 1950s and 1960s was also a 'Golden Age' for Philippine cinema, with the emergence of more artistic and mature films, and significant improvement in cinematic techniques among filmmakers. The studio system produced frenetic activity in the local film industry as many films were made annually and several local talents started to earn recognition abroad. The premiere Philippine directors of the era included Gerardo de Leon, Gregorio Fernandez, Eddie Romero, Lamberto Avellana, and Cirio Santiago.

The cinema of South Korea also experienced a 'Golden Age' in the late 1950s and 1960s, beginning with director Lee Kyu-hwan's tremendously successful remake of Chunhyang-jon (1955). That year also saw the release of Yangsan Province by the renowned director, Kim Ki-young, marking the beginning of his productive career. Both the quality and quantity of filmmaking had increased rapidly by the end of the 1950s. South Korean films, such as Lee Byeong-il's 1956 comedy Sijibganeun nal (The Wedding Day), had begun winning international awards. In contrast to the beginning of the 1950s, when only 5 movies were made per year, 111 films were produced in South Korea in 1959.

Films of this period included Kim Ki-young's The Housemaid (1960) and Yu Hyun-mok's Aimless Bullet (1961).

The 1960s is often cited as being the 'golden age' of Pakistani cinema. Many A-stars were introduced in this period in time and became legends on the silver screen. Early works in Pakistani cinema introducing colour films, from the earlier standard of black-and-white, included the partly colour Azra (1962). Shaheed (1962) had at its center the Palestinian struggle and became a commercial success.

The 1960s was the "golden age" of Cambodian cinema. Several production companies were started and more movie theaters were built throughout the country. More than 300 movies were made in Cambodia during the era. A number of Khmer language films were well received in neighbouring countries at the time. Among the classic films from Cambodia during this period were Lea Haey Duong Dara (Goodbye Duong Dara) and Pos Keng Kang (The Snake King's Wife) by Tea Lim Kun and Sabbseth, and An Euil Srey An (Khmer After Angkor) by Ly Bun Yim.

=== Modern Asian cinema (1970s–present) ===
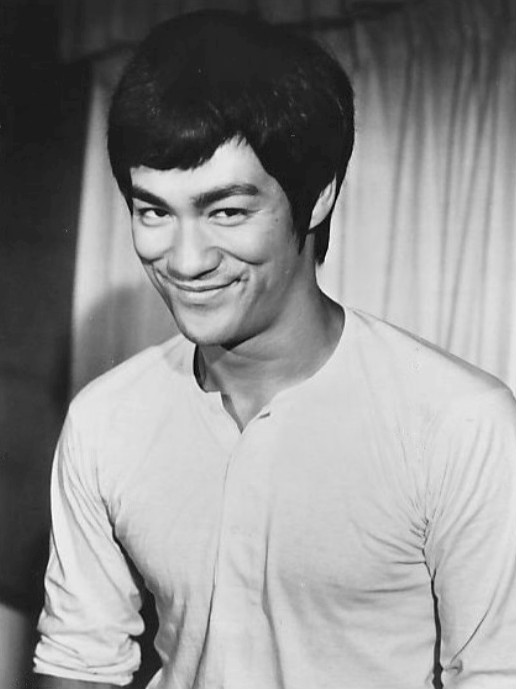
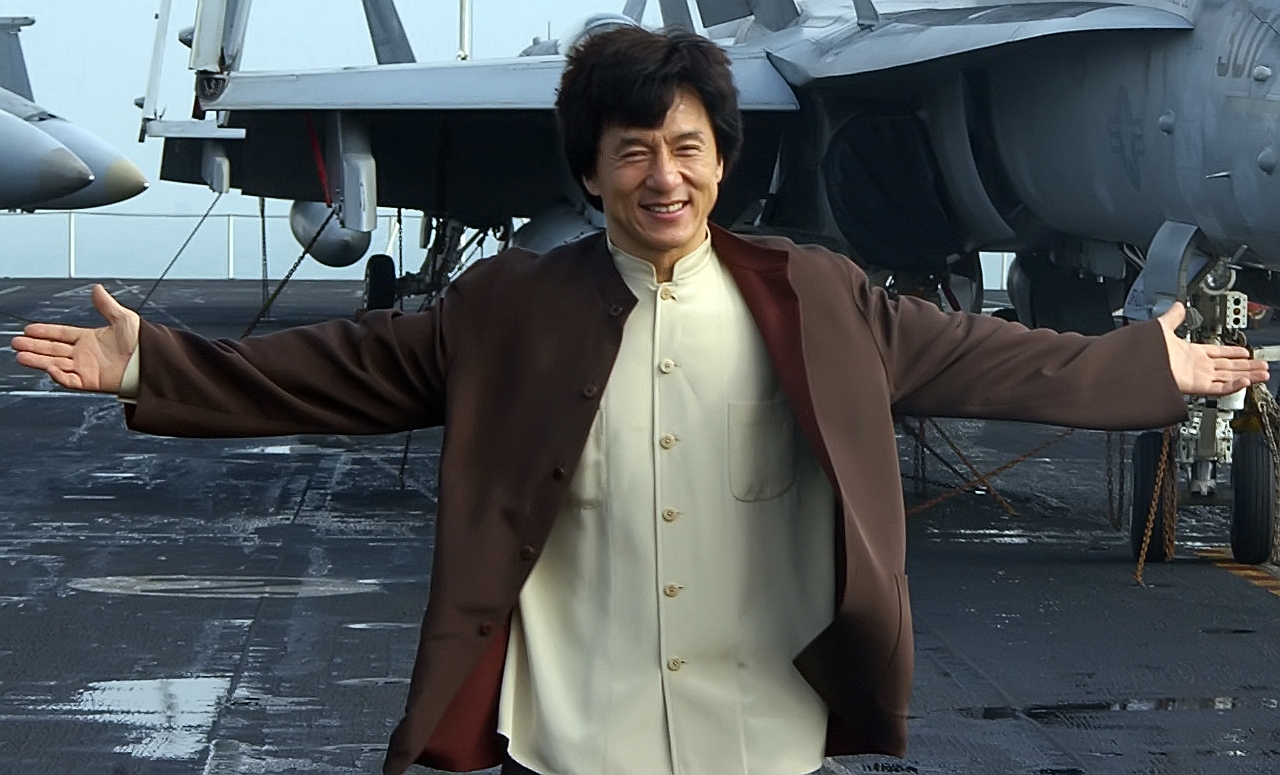
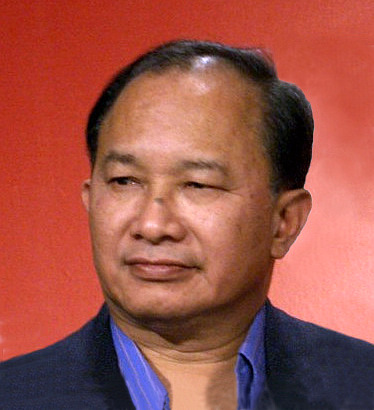
Bruce Lee (left), Jackie Chan (middle), and John Woo (right), three of the most iconic figures from Hong Kong action cinema.

By the late 1960s and early 1970s, Japanese cinema had begun to become seriously affected by the collapse of the studio system. As Japanese cinema slipped into a period of relative low visibility, the cinema of Hong Kong entered a dramatic renaissance of its own, largely a side effect of the development of the wuxia blending of action, history, and spiritual concerns. Several major figures emerged in Hong Kong at this time, including King Hu, whose 1966 Come Drink With Me was a key influence upon many subsequent Hong Kong cinematic developments. Shortly thereafter, the American-born Bruce Lee became a global icon in the 1970s.

The Iranian New Wave began in the 1960s. Two notable films of this period, of 1969, included Masoud Kimiai's Qeysar and Dariush Mehrjui's The Cow, the latter gaining recognition at international festivals in 1971.

Cinema in what became Bangladesh began its development prior to the achievement of independence by Bangladesh in 1971. Abdul Jabbar Khan's Mukh O Mukhosh was released in 1956 in what was then East Pakistan. One of the first films produced in Bangladesh after independence was Titash Ekti Nadir Naam (A River Called Titas) in 1973 by acclaimed director Ritwik Ghatak, whose stature in Bengali cinema is comparable to that of Satyajit Ray and Mrinal Sen. Another great film of Bangladesh is Mita's 'Lathial' (The striker), were the best movies of the year of 1975. 'Lathial' got first National Award as the best film, and mita got first National Award as best director.

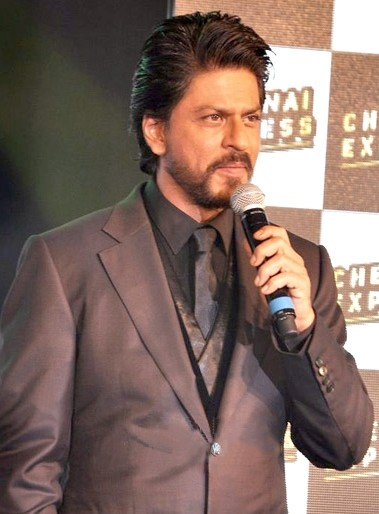
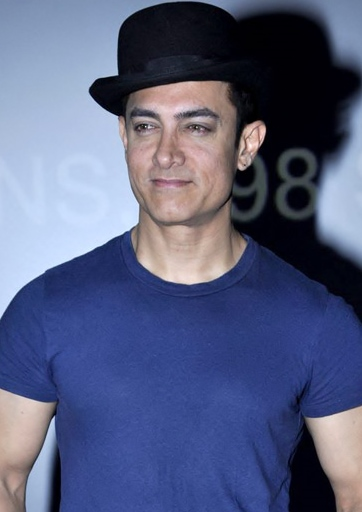
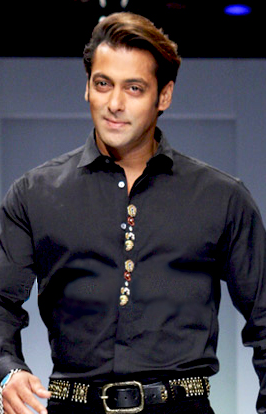
Shah Rukh Khan (left), Aamir Khan (middle), and Salman Khan (right), the three Khans of Bollywood.

In the cinema of India, the 1970s were a high point of Parallel Cinema. The decade also saw the rise of commercial Hindi cinema in the form of enduring masala films, a genre largely pioneered by screenwriter duo Salim–Javed, with films such as the Mumbai underworld crime drama Deewaar (1975) and the film Sholay (1975), which solidified Amitabh Bachchan's position as a lead actor. Commercial cinema further grew throughout the 1980s and the 1990s with the release of films such as Mr. India (1987), Qayamat Se Qayamat Tak (1988), Tezaab (1988), Chandni (1989), Maine Pyar Kiya (1989), Baazigar (1993), Darr (1993), Hum Aapke Hain Koun..! (1994) and Dilwale Dulhaniya Le Jayenge (1995). By this time, the term "Bollywood" was coined to refer to the Hindi-language Bombay (now Mumbai) film industry. By the early 2020s, S. S. Rajamouli's epic duology Baahubali, and alternate history film RRR received the American Saturn Award nominations in various categories, the only Indian films to have garnered the honors. Rajamouli's success played a role in the broader growth of the South Indian film industries, which now are on par with Bollywood films in terms of box office revenue.

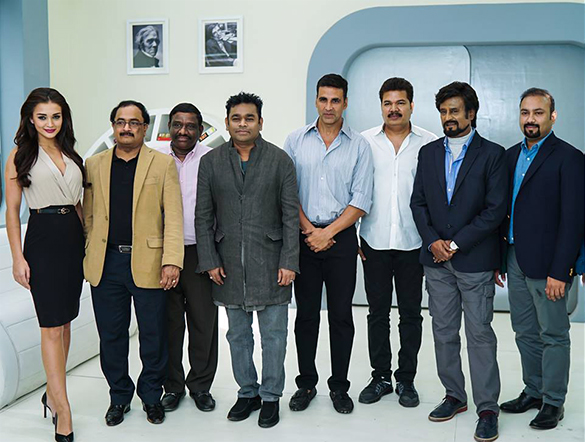
Indian film 2.0's cast and crew including actors Rajinikanth, Akshay Kumar, Amy Jackson, director S. Shankar, producer Allirajah Subaskaran and music director A. R. Rahman

During the 1980s, Japanese cinema – aided by the rise of independent filmmaking and the spectacular success of anime – began to make something of an international comeback. Simultaneously, a new post-Mao Zedong generation of Chinese filmmakers began to gain global attention. Another group of filmmakers, centered around Edward Yang and Hou Hsiao-hsien, launched what has become known as the "Taiwanese New Wave".

The 1980s is also considered the Golden Age of Hong Kong action cinema. Jackie Chan combined martial arts film with slapstick comedy in films such as Drunken Master (1978), and then again in Project A (1983). John Woo began the "heroic bloodshed" genre based on triads, beginning with A Better Tomorrow (1986). The Hong Kong New Wave also occurred during this period, led by filmmakers such as Tsui Hark.

With the post-1980 rise in popularity of East Asian cinema in the West, Western audiences are again becoming familiar with many of the industry's filmmakers and stars. A number of these key players, such as Chow Yun-fat and Zhang Ziyi, have "crossed over", working in Western films. Others have gained exposure through the international success of their films, though many more retain more of a "cult" appeal, finding a degree of Western success through DVD sales rather than cinema releases. In the modern era, Israeli cinema has seen a wave of success in the 21st century, with several Israeli films winning awards in film festivals around the world. Prominent films of this period include Late Marriage (Dover Koshashvili), Broken Wings, Walk on Water and Yossi & Jagger (Eytan Fox), Nina's Tragedies, Campfire and Beaufort (Joseph Cedar), Or (My Treasure) (Keren Yedaya), Turn Left at the End of the World (Avi Nesher), The Band's Visit (Eran Kolirin) Waltz With Bashir (Ari Folman), and Ajami. In 2011, Strangers No More won the Oscar for best Short Documentary.

In 2020, the South Korean film Parasite become the first non-English language film to win the Academy Award for Best Picture at the 92nd Academy Awards.

== Events ==
One of the most famous Asian film festivals in Europe is the Vesoul International Film Festival of Asian Cinema, founded in 1995.

== See also ==
- Cinema of the world
- World cinema
- East Asian cinema
- Southeast Asian cinema
- South Asian cinema
- The Network for the Promotion of Asian Cinema
- Vostokkino
