= FWB =

FWB may refer to:

== Locations ==
- Branson West Airport, in Missouri, United States
- Fort Walton Beach, Florida, a city in the United States
- Wiesbaden-Biebrich station, in Germany

== Organizations ==
- Feinwerkbau, a German firearm manufacturer
- Filmmakers Without Borders, an American charity
- Frankfurt Stock Exchange (German: Frankfurter Wertpapierbörse)
- Free Will Baptist, a Christian denomination
- French Community of Belgium (French: Fédération Wallonie-Bruxelles, "Wallonia-Brussels Federation")

== Other ==
- "Friends with benefits", friends who carry on a casual sexual relationship
