= Angk Ta Saom Commune =

Angk Ta Saom ឃុំអង្គតាសោម
- Commune (Khum)
- Location within Cambodia
- Coordinates: 10°59′03″N 104°39′45″E
- Country: Cambodia
- Province: Takéo
- District: Tram Kak
- Time zone: UTC+7
- Geocode: 210901

Angk Ta Saom Commune (Khmer: ឃុំអង្គតាសោម) is a khum (commune) in Tram Kak District, Takéo Province, Cambodia.

== Administration ==
As of 2019, Angk Ta Saom Commune has 22 phums (villages) as follows.

| No. | Code | Village | Khmer |
|---|---|---|---|
| 1 | 21090101 | Srok Chek | ស្រុកចេក |
| 2 | 21090102 | Prey Damrei | ព្រៃដំរី |
| 3 | 21090103 | Prey Sraong | ព្រៃស្រោង |
| 4 | 21090104 | Prey Chheu Teal Leu | ព្រៃឈើទាលលើ |
| 5 | 21090105 | Chheu Teal Prakeab | ឈើទាលប្រគាប |
| 6 | 21090106 | Prey Chheu Teal Kraom | ព្រៃឈើទាលក្រោម |
| 7 | 21090107 | Angk Ta Saom | អង្គតាសោម |
| 8 | 21090108 | Trapeang Khnar | ត្រពាំងខ្នារ |
| 9 | 21090109 | Sek Yea | សេកយា |
| 10 | 21090110 | Our Phot | អូរផុត |
| 11 | 21090111 | Khna Tey | ខ្នាទៃ |
| 12 | 21090112 | Prey Rumdeng | ព្រៃរំដេង |
| 13 | 21090113 | Trapeang Chaeng | ត្រពាំងចែង |
| 14 | 21090114 | Angk Tnaot Khang Lech | អង្គត្នោតខាងលិច |
| 15 | 21090115 | Trapeang Srangae | ត្រពាំងស្រង៉ែ |
| 16 | 21090116 | Angk Tnaot Khang Kaeut | អង្គត្នោតខាងកើត |
| 17 | 21090117 | Chamkar Dieb | ចំការដៀប |
| 18 | 21090118 | Sman Pream | ស្មន់ព្រាម |
| 19 | 21090119 | Trapeang Trabaek | ត្រពាំងត្របែក |
| 20 | 21090120 | Prey Preay | ព្រៃព្រាយ |
| 21 | 21090121 | Trapeang Khlout | ត្រពាំងខ្លូត |
| 22 | 21090122 | Angkor Moeang | អង្គរមឿង |
| 23 | 21090122 | Bakod Village | Porsueh |
