= Kus Commune =

Kus ឃុំគុស
- Commune (Khum)
- Location within Cambodia
- Coordinates: 10°56′57″N 104°36′07″E
- Country: Cambodia
- Province: Takéo
- District: Tram Kak
- Time zone: UTC+7
- Geocode: 210903

Kus Commune (Khmer: ឃុំគុស) is a khum (commune) in Tram Kak District, Takéo Province, Cambodia.

== Administration ==
As of 2019, Kus Commune has 30 phums (villages) as follows.

No.	Code	Village	Khmer
1	21090301	Kus Thmei	គុសថ្មី
2	21090302	Tuek Thla	ទឹកថ្លា
3	21090303	Tumnob Chrey	ទំនប់ជ្រៃ
4	21090304	Khnach Chaor	ខ្នាចចោរ
5	21090305	Ak Pong	អកពង
6	21090306	Mean Chey	មានជ័យ
7	21090307	Angk Kralanh	អង្គក្រឡាញ់
8	21090308	Angk Ta Ngel	អង្គតាង៉ិល
9	21090309	Chheu Teal Thkoul	ឈើទាលថ្គោល
10	21090310	Pong Tuek Khang Cheung	ពងទឹកខាងជើង
11	21090311	Kreang Ta Chan	គ្រាំងតាចាន់
12	21090312	Niel	នៀល
13	21090313	Trapeang Lean	ត្រពាំងលាន
14	21090314	Tmat Pong	ត្មាតពង
15	21090315	Trapeang Pring	ត្រពាំងព្រីង
16	21090316	Trapeang Thma	ត្រពាំងថ្ម
17	21090317	Ta Leak Khang Cheung	តាលាក់ខាងជើង
18	21090318	Ta Leak Khang Tboung	តាលាក់ខាងត្បូង
19	21090319	Trapeang Ta Sokh	ត្រពាំងតាសុខ
20	21090320	Trapeang Ampil	ត្រពាំងអំពិល
21	21090321	Chamkar Tieng	ចំការទៀង
22	21090322	Saen Aok	សែនអោក
23	21090323	Tonsaong Rou	ទន្សោងរោទ៍
24	21090324	Trapeang Chheu Teal	ត្រពាំងឈើទាល
25	21090325	Prey Snuol	ព្រៃស្នួល
26	21090326	Chamkar Angk Khang Cheung	ចំការអង្គខាងជើង
27	21090327	Chamkar Angk Khang Tboung	ចំការអង្គខាងត្បូង
28	21090328	Pong Tuek Khang Tboung	ពងទឹកខាងត្បូង
29	21090329	Andoung Thma	អណ្ដូងថ្ម
30	21090330	Prey Ta Khab	ព្រៃតាខាប
