= Who Am I? (2009 film) =

- theatrical poster
- Directed by: Phoan Phoung Bopha
- Written by: Phoan Phoung Bopha; Bol Pisey
- Produced by: Phoan Phoung Bopha
- Starring: Keo Sreyneang; Ny Monica
- Distributed by: Pkal Pream Production
- Release date: 1 April 2009
- Running time: 120 minutes
- Country: Cambodia
- Language: Khmer
- Budget: US$20,000

Who Am I? (Khmer: ខ្ញុំជាអ្នកណា?, Khnhŭm Chéa Neăk Na?) is the debut Cambodian lesbian-themed tragic romance film by writer and director Khmer novelist, Phoan Phoung Bopha. The plot deals with a taboo lesbian love story about a Cambodian-American woman infatuated with a famous Cambodian actress.

== Plot ==
Rath (Keo Sreyneang), a Cambodian-American woman, who returns to Cambodia in order to meet her favorite Khmer singer-actress, Thida (Ny Monica), after a series of long-distance telephone conversations. With strong help and support, Thida becomes godsister to Rath, who is allowed to live with her and her family in Cambodia. Their relationship begins as a sisterly relationship akin to best friends, with the two inseparable and constantly spending time with each other. Unbeknownst to Thida, Rath has romantic feelings for her.

One night, Rath forces herself onto Thida. Thida cries out and is heard by her mother. She is warned by her mother not to have any type of intimate relationship with Rath. Thida, realizing that she is in love with Rath, continues to find ways to see Rath.

Thida's parents find out about Thida and Rath's relationship and attempt to separate the two by marrying Thida to a man. She and Rath run off together on the day of the wedding and are pursued by the enraged fiancé. He confronts Rath and shoots her, causing a devastated Thida to commit suicide despite her parents' pleas. Later, the boyfriend is arrested for having caused the deaths of both women.

== Production ==
The film took six months to write and three months to film, with a budget of $20,000. The film concept came about when the director, Phoan Phoung Bopha, first worked for the Cambodian Television Network (CTN) while also working alongside gays and lesbians and learned of their personal stories.

In addition, she stated that the storyline of the film was loosely based on some real-life Khmer celebrities. Phoan Phoung Bopha's intent was to make a film that would humanize the issue and raise awareness of discrimination against gays/lesbians. The film is now available with English subtitles.

== Reception ==
The film was widely received and was a surprising success in its first week. It attracted some 4,000 viewers in just one theatre in Phnom Penh while there was another one in Siem Reap. Its success signifies a blockbuster for the country's tiny movie industry. "This film has been successful beyond our expectations while the film industry has declined. This film draws great attention," Phoan Phoung Bopha said. After spending a month in Lux theatre, the film was then released in the Soriya Mall Cinema where approximately 500 to 1,000 tickets were sold per day—a major hit for a Cambodian film release.

Who Am I? surprised Cambodia with a new and taboo plot of same-sex love (see LGBT), which created a monster wave of movie-goers to the cinema (see the history of Cinema of Cambodia). Several Khmer young writers started to provide similar storylines in upcoming literature. The first lesbian-related novel was Gentle's Love, written by Chan Poul. The DVD market also received the issue after a Thai gay film, called Bangkok Love Story, became the top-selling film in Cambodia and Laos.

With a lesbian love plot already in place with Who Am I?, Cambodia also announced its annual Gay Pride parade in Phnom Penh again, which occurred in mid-May 2009 and coincided with International Day Against Homophobia.

In spite of its success, not everyone was excited by its taboo storyline. It also received some critical responses from some audience members. One university student responded that the film will make the audience turn homosexual after watching it. The director rebuffed this by saying spending two hours watching the film won't change one's sexual identity at all, but that she hopes that people will try to understand the non-discrimination message.

Initially, the director was concerned that she would not get the national permit to make this film from the Ministry of Fine Arts. She was apprehensive because of the film topic and how Cambodians would receive it as it is against Cambodian traditional views.

Previously, Cambodian Prime Minister Hun Sen in 2007, publicly announced and denounced his adopted daughter who is a lesbian. He stated that he legally severed ties with her because of her "bad" behavior and did not want her to seek future financial gain as she might cause further problems with the family. Meanwhile, Hun appealed to the public to not discriminate against gays and lesbians.

Despite the Prime Minister's recent personal revelation, the film's popularity was not at all affected. The success is most likely due to the very proactive international communities of LGBT's fight for equal marriage rights (see Same-sex marriage). The coincidence of the film release has since created more interests around the world in this film.

Since the release, CTN has made a TV series called Dong Vitey Dara (2009) of which the film, Who Am I? was a spin-off. Dong Vitey Dara, meaning "Celebrities' Road," is a Cambodian TV soap opera series based on the lives of Khmer stars in the show. Who Am I? is one of the actors' and actresses' new film projects within the soap opera, Dong Vitey Dara.

It has been argued that Who Am I? influenced the Burmese film The Gemini, where a love story between two gay men also meets strong opposition by parents and ends in tragedy.

== Themes ==
One of the themes is a positive view regarding homosexuality. In Cambodian society, same-sex love or relationships are frowned upon and such acts are viewed as shameful and degrading for the family image or reputation. The film, which was promoted in such a politically correct manner, conveys the message to avoid discrimination of gays and lesbians in Cambodia. Another theme is a negative one; that such relationships are forbidden and should not be allowed to be carried on in Cambodian society, and that gays and lesbians are not allowed to live happily ever after in a very conservative Southeast Asian nation. Viewers are left with a message to ponder regarding whether or not they should accept homosexuality. The film director tried to appeal to both sides of the argument. Other themes include culture clash among people with traditional view and modern-day liberal views, love triangle, arranged marriage, and western views versus non-western views.
