= Nieng Arp =

- DVD cover
- Directed by: Kam Chanty
- Written by: Kam Chanty
- Produced by: Kam Chanty
- Starring: Dan Monika; Sovan Makar
- Distributed by: FCI production Cambodia
- Release date: 24 August 2004
- Running time: 120 minutes
- Country: Cambodia
- Language: Khmer
- Budget: 9000 $

Nieng Arp (Khmer: អាប), with an international title of Lady Vampire and also known as Vampire and Bodyless, is a 2004 Cambodian horror film. The film is based on Khmer folklore beliefs about Ahp or Ap, a mythical demon which is found in Southeast Asia. The film is directed by Kam Chanthy, a Cambodian-born director who was trained in Thailand.

== Plot ==
In the middle of a long night, a young woman and her boyfriend are confronted by a group of gangsters on their way home. The girl is violently raped and her lover is killed by gangsters. While unconsciousness she is possessed by an old witch, immediately making her part of the next generation of Ahp ghosts. After becoming an Ahp, she takes vengeance on the gang that raped her.

16 years later, a group of students on a field trip to Battambang arrive at the van and pray to a battabang guardian. Then they see a group of people looking at a corpse. They find a house whose owner is the Ahp. They ask permission to stay there for their field trip and she says yes.

== Critical reception ==
The website The Fright said the film is in the throat-ripping tradition of Mystics in Bali and Demonic Beauty. The review strongly praised the camera work and lighting. They criticized the low quality of special effects, however, as not able to match expectations for a modern film.

== Box office ==
This film is considered to be the first successful Khmer horror film in recent years, having grossed over $100,000 solely from the six movie theatres in Phnom Penh.

In the DVD version, the film consists of two discs with no special features or scene selection. English subtitles were included on a DVD release for foreign audiences.

== Special effects ==
Special effects are primarily not computer generated. In one scene, a doll's head filled with pig intestines was used to make the Ahp's head.

== Origins ==
In the Khmer ghost legends, Ahps or Aps are ghosts who are able to remove their heads at night to fly across the rice fields in search of sustenance, usually blood. Stomach, heart and intestines trail from their necks.

This nocturnal female ghost with a floating head is part of popular Southeast Asian mythology, namely the folklore of Cambodia, Indonesia, Laos, Malaysia and Thailand. In Laos the ghost is called Pi-Kasu, while in Thailand it is known as Krasue and in Malaysia Penanggalan.
