= Gladiator Underground =

- Official release poster
- Directed by: Chaya Supannarat
- Written by: Ariel Bleiberg
- Starring: D.Y. Sao; Andy Le; Brian Le; Geoffrey Giuliano; Sam Lee Herring; Apasiri Kulthanan
- Production companies: 116 Pictures; Ave Net; Rock Solid Productions
- Distributed by: Samuel Goldwyn Films
- Release dates: August 22, 2025 (Big Bad Film Fest); October 17, 2025 (United States)
- Running time: 106 minutes
- Country: Thailand
- Language: English

Gladiator Underground is a 2025 Thai martial arts action film directed by Chaya Supannarat and written by Ariel Bleiberg. The film stars D.Y. Sao, Andy Le, and Brian Le. The story follows two estranged brothers who become participants in a deadly underground fighting tournament controlled by a criminal syndicate. It was released digitally in the United States on October 17, 2025, by Samuel Goldwyn Films.

== Plot ==
Wu Yen comes back to Loklang City after years of separation from his brother, Max Yen. The two brothers were raised in the streets and trained in Martial arts by Huang Sifu, who was teaching them how to be disciplined and virtuous. After some time, Wu leaves the city along with Sifu, while Max stays there and becomes a drunk and a street fighter. Eventually, both brothers enter the Naraka Tournament, which is an underground martial arts championship organized by the notorious Crime lord Mantis.

Wu participates in the tournament accompanied by Sifu, who comes back to Loklang City and opens his kung fu school. He sees the tournament as a chance to fight the Criminal organization, which controls the city. Max fails to find a sponsor for himself. However, he persuades Veena a pro gambler that is into Mah-Jongg and Casino gambling, to become his sponsor by showing his martial abilities. The desire of Max to win is partly motivated by rivalry with Wu and his resentment about the fact that Sifu left him behind.

Sifu tells Wu that the tournament is not only about fighting but also about profits, which are made by the criminal organization controlling the city. Moreover, Sifu believes that Wu can fight the system by using the principles of Huang Kung Fu. At the same time, Sifu wants him to help Max, because he thinks that his brother became stuck in a dangerous life situation. However, Bohan see Sifu's return as a challenge and decide to get rid of him.

Sifu is attacked at his school and badly injured by Sho-Jin after being sent by Bohan to get rid of Sifu. Max comes there after the phone call from Wu and finds Sifu dying. He asks the brothers to fight together before he dies. Wu makes a promise to do as Sifu told.

The Naraka Tournament starts with fighters fighting for a large cash prizes while sponsors make bets on the fights. In addition, sponsors may use Wheel of Steel to introduce any kind of weapons into fights. Max beats Speedy T in his first fight, while Wu defeats Greyface. In the fight with the help of Wheel of Steel, Sho-Jin kills Magic Money Marcus. Kerchak Kong, the reigning champion, goes to the next round, beating Darius.

The next round consists of fighters Max, Wu, Sharkbite, and H8Ball. Both pairs of opponents have weapons because of the usage of Wheel of Steel. Moreover, Veena gets weapons for Max. However, the brothers beat their opponents despite the increasing violence of the tournament. Wu suggests that they should follow Sifu's principles and continue fighting for them, not killing people for the pleasure of the spectators. He also proposes to get to the final round and refuse to fight, making a disclosure about the tournament and its corrupt character. Veena suggests Wu to lose to Max in the final to get prize money and to deny Mantis her fight.

Mantis finds out about the plan of Wu and threatens him. She tells that she will kill Max, Wu, Veena, and all students of the school of Huang if they try to destroy the tournament. Moreover, she says that she uses the tournament to control all gangs of the city. Therefore, she orders Wu to continue participation in it. The next round becomes a free-for-all tournament with participation of all remaining fighters. Max, Wu, Kerchak Kong, and other fighters are fighting each other while sponsors again use Wheel of Steel to influence the fights. Some fighters are knocked out, and now Max, Wu, and other participants fight for their participation in the final round. The growing dependence on alcohol and unwillingness to follow the plan of his brother causes problems between Max and Wu.

Wu finally gets to the final and has to face Sho-Jin, who is enhanced by Beast Serum and who wants to kill him, because he is guilty of the death of Sifu. Wu gets the advantage over his opponent, but he does not want to kill him saying that he violates the principles of Sifu by doing that. However, Sho-Jin tells that Mantis and Bohan will attack his family if he survives. However, Wu does not want to kill him.

Mantis gets angry with that and threatens Veena and orders Wu to kill Sho-Jin. She decides to kill Veena herself but is stopped by Max, who shoots Mantis. Then, Max, Wu, and Veena run away but are pursued by Bohan and other fighters. Sho-Jin fights with Bohan and kills him, and escape from him with tournament money. Later, new Huang Kung Fu Academy opens in honor of Sifu. Wu announces a friendly sparring match between himself and Max.

== Cast ==
- D.Y. Sao as Max Yen
- Andy Le as Wu Yen
- Brian Le as Sho-Jin
- Geoffrey Giuliano as Bohan
- Sam Lee Herring as Sharkbite
- Apasiri Kulthanan as Veena
- Johnny Lee as Vampyre
- Craig Ng as Sifu Huang
- Selina Wiesmann as Mantis
- Bear Williams as Kerchak Kong

== Reception ==
Writing for Gazettely, Alessandro Bianchi described the film as a modern homage to martial arts tournament films such as Bloodsport (1988) and Kickboxer (1989). Bianchi praised the choreography by Martial Club, highlighting the distinct fighting styles of D.Y. Sao, Andy Le, and Brian Le, as well as the tournament mechanics, including weapon-based combat and changing arena layouts. He also commended director Chaya Supannarat for making effective use of the film's modest budget, though he noted that some supporting performances were uneven and that the principal villains lacked the physical presence. Darren Murray of M.A.A.C. (Martial Arts Action Cinema) similarly compared the film to classic 1980s martial arts tournament features, describing its premise as familiar but effective. He wrote that "although the story offered little originality, the film compensated" with "fabulous fight scenes," adding that the quality of the action choreography made its narrative shortcomings easy to overlook. Z Ravas from City on Fire gave the movie a rating of 6 out of 10, noting that it is an average tournament martial arts film which works well only due to its action, not the script. He pointed out the acting skills of D.Y. Sao and Le brothers, particularly the fighting scenes choreographed by Joseph Le and said that hand-to-hand combat was the best part of the entire movie but was not fond of the dialogue and predictable plot of the film and also the fact that it focuses more on weapon fight than martial arts. In summary, despite failing to make significant changes in the tournament genre, the movie was quite entertaining.
