= Bopha Pailin =

Cambodian TV soap opera

- Also known as: Kolap Pailin
- Genre: Soap opera
- Created by: Mao Ayuth
- Written by: Mao Ayuth (Head writer)
- Country of origin: Cambodia
- No. of episodes: 12

Production
- Executive producer: Mao Ayuth
- Running time: 22 minutes

Original release
- Network: Cambodian Television Network
- Release: 1998

Bopha Pailin is a 1998 Khmer Boran soap opera. It is the first of its kind, being a boran TV opera followed by the second boran TV opera also starring Chan Leakennam, the 2009 Peus Snae. The series was based on the 1951 Khmer novel Kolap Pailin which was once a film in 1962 and starred Chea Yuthon and Dy Saveth.

== History ==
The series did not last very long but is an exception for its time. It is considered Chan Leakenna's first TV soap opera; she was 18 at the time.
