= Tram Kak Commune =

Tram Kak ឃុំត្រាំកក់
- Commune (Khum)
- Location within Cambodia
- Coordinates: 10°54′35″N 104°34′46″E
- Country: Cambodia
- Province: Takéo
- District: Tram Kak
- Time zone: UTC+7
- Geocode: 210913

Tram Kak Commune (Khmer: ឃុំត្រាំកក់) is a khum (commune) in Tram Kak District, Takéo Province, Cambodia.

== Administration ==
As of 2019, Tram Kak Commune has 13 phums (villages) as follows.

No.	Code	Village	Khmer
1	21091301	Yeay La	យាយឡ
2	21091302	Chrey Tnaot	ជ្រៃត្នោត
3	21091303	Trapeang Rumpeak	ត្រពាំងរំពាក់
4	21091304	Niel	នៀល
5	21091305	Trapeang Kaes	ត្រពាំងកែស
6	21091306	Trapeang Chak	ត្រពាំងចក
7	21091307	Kol Kom	គល់គម
8	21091308	Angk Roneab	អង្គរនាប
9	21091309	Trapeang Ruessei	ត្រពាំងឫស្សី
10	21091310	Trapeang Khlout	ត្រពាំងខ្លូត
11	21091311	Boeng Mkak	បឹងម្កាក់
12	21091312	Krang Kor	ក្រាំងគរ
13	21091313	Thma Kaev	ថ្មកែវ
