= Chompa Toung =

- The Cambodian film poster.
- Directed by: Lim Bun Lun
- Written by: Ang Duong
- Distributed by: Preah Tiakon entertainment
- Release date: 1969
- Country: Cambodia
- Language: Khmer

Chompa Toung (Khmer: ចំប៉ាថោង, Golden champak), also known in English as Crocodile Man 2, is a 1969 fantasy Cambodian horror film. It is the sequel to the 1967 film Crocodile Man. It is loosely based on one of the Royal Poems written by Khmer King Ang Duong (1796–1860).

It was a commercial success in Cambodia.

== Plot ==
Chompa Tong, a daughter of a king received two pets which one was a kitten and another was a crocodile's egg but she dropped the egg into the water where it grew into a powerful crocodile who could turn into a man and killed many women for food and fun. One day, Chompa Tong, was kidnapped and a young prince called Jak Jan, swam into the water to save her. Can Jak Jan save the princess from the terrible crocodile?

== Cast ==
- Dy Saveth
- Kong Som Eun
- Seng Bothum

== Soundtrack ==
Song	Singer(s)	Notes
Knhom Chmuos Chey Chet	Sinn Sisamouth and Ros Serey Sothea	
