= Tram Kak District =

Tram Kak District ស្រុកត្រាំកក់
- District (srok)
- Location in Cambodia
- Coordinates: 11°0′N 104°35′E
- Country: Cambodia
- Province: Takeo
- Communes: 15
- Villages: 244
- Time zone: UTC+7 (ICT)
- Geocode: 2109

Tram Kak District (Khmer: ស្រុកត្រាំកក់) is a district located in Takeo Province, in southern Cambodia. According to the 1998 census of Cambodia, it had a population of 144,032.

== Administration ==
As of 2019, Tram Kak District has 15 communes, 244 villages.

No.	Code	Commune	Khmer	Number of Villages	Villages (Khmer)
1	210901	Angk Ta Saom	ឃុំអង្គតាសោម	22	Please add villages
2	210902	Cheang Tong	ឃុំជាងទង	16	Moeurng Char មឿងចារ, Sandoa សណ្ដោរ, Nor Moa នមោ, Tuol Tbaeng ទួលត្បែង, Srae Kruo ស្រែក្រួ, Ang Baksey អង្គបក្សី, Trapang Kak ត្រពាំងកក់, Ong Krolanh អង្គក្រឡាញ់, Ta Reap តារាប, Ta Teum តាតឹម, Ta Suon តាសួន, Tuol Rokar ទួលរកា, ...(Please help edit)
3	210903	Kus	ឃុំគុស	30	Villages(ភូមិ)
4	210904	Leay Bour	ឃុំលាយបូរ	25	Please add villages
5	210905	Nhaeng Nhang	ឃុំញ៉ែងញ៉ង	11	Please add villages
6	210906	Our Saray	ឃុំអូរសារាយ	12	Please add villages
7	210907	Trapeang Kranhung	ឃុំត្រពាំងក្រញូង	9	Please add villages
8	210908	Otdam Soriya	ឃុំឧត្ដមសុរិយា	14	Please add villages
9	210909	Popel	ឃុំពពេល	12	Please add villages
10	210910	Samraong	ឃុំសំរោង	16	Please add villages
11	210911	Srae Ronoung	ឃុំស្រែរនោង	17	Srae thnolស្រែថ្លុក Srae Chheuneangស្រែឈើនៀង, Trapang Thnalត្រពាំងថ្នល់, Trapang Tamlabត្រពាំងទំន្លាប់, Thmeiថ្មី, Samakiសាមគ្គី, Trapang Normoangត្រពាំងននោង, Trachត្រាច, Kok Roviengគោករវៀង, Chrei Vengជ្រៃវែង, Krang Svayក្រាំងស្វាយ, Prochoumប្រជុំ, Prey Moukព្រៃមោក, Takeoតាកែវ, Bravorl Nayប្រវលន័យ and Trapang Sambeumត្រពាំងសំបើម។
12	210912	Ta Phem	ឃុំតាភេម	23	Angk Kokir អង្គគគីរ, Ba Khong Khang Kaeut បាខុងខាងកើត, Ba Khong Khang Lech បាខុងខាងលិច, Khla Krohuem ខ្លាគ្រហឹម, Li Nha លីញ៉ា, Moha Sena មហាសេនា, Mrum ម្រុំ, Nang Sray ណងស្រាយ, Ou Phot អូរផុត, Pou Preah Sang ពោធិ៍ព្រះសង្ឃ, Prasung ប្រស៊ូង, Pravong ប្រវង់, Prey Chheu Teal ព្រៃឈើទាល, Ta Koam តាគាំ, Ta Koem តាកឹម, Ta Moch តាម៉ុច, Ta Mom តាមុំ, Ta Phem តាភេម, Ta Sou តាសូ, Tbaeng Totueng ត្បែងទទឹង, Trapeang Ampil ត្រពាំងអំពិល, Trapeang Kabbas ត្រពាំងកប្បាស, Trapeang Svay ត្រពាំងស្វាយ
13	210913	Tram Kak	ឃុំត្រាំកក់	13	Please add villages
14	210914	Trapeang Thum Khang Cheung	ឃុំត្រពាំងធំខាងជើង	11	Please add villages
15	210915	Trapeang Thum Khang Tboung	ឃុំត្រពាំងធំខាងត្បូង	13	Please add villages
Total				244	

== Notable people ==
- Reth Tiger (born 1998), martial artist, actor and stunt man
