= Otdam Soriya Commune =

Otdam Soriya ឃុំឧត្ដមសុរិយា
- Commune (Khum)
- Location within Cambodia
- Coordinates: 11°03′57″N 104°42′25″E
- Country: Cambodia
- Province: Takéo
- District: Tram Kak
- Time zone: UTC+7
- Geocode: 210908

Otdam Soriya Commune (Khmer: ឃុំឧត្ដមសុរិយា) is a khum (commune) in Tram Kak District, Takéo Province, Cambodia.

== Administration ==
As of 2019, Otdam Soriya Commune has 14 phums (villages) as follows.

| No. | Code | Village | Khmer |
|---|---|---|---|
| 1 | 21090801 | Trapeang Run | ត្រពាំងរុន |
| 2 | 21090802 | Chong Ang | ចុងអាង |
| 3 | 21090803 | Trapeang Trakiet | ត្រពាំងត្រកៀត |
| 4 | 21090804 | Angk Rumpeak | អង្គរំពាក់ |
| 5 | 21090805 | Dak Van | ដកវ៉ាន |
| 6 | 21090806 | Ta Sour | តាសូរ |
| 7 | 21090807 | Ta Loea | តាលឿ |
| 8 | 21090808 | Rumpeak Pen | រំពាក់ពេន |
| 9 | 21090809 | Trapeang Thlan | ត្រពាំងថ្លាន់ |
| 10 | 21090810 | Prab Siem | ប្របសៀម |
| 11 | 21090811 | Rumlech Svay | រំលេចស្វាយ |
| 12 | 21090812 | Srangae | ស្រង៉ែ |
| 13 | 21090813 | Prey Chheu Teal | ព្រៃឈើទាល |
| 14 | 21090814 | Trapeang Chhuk | ត្រពាំងឈូក |
