= Trapeang Thum Khang Tboung Commune =

Trapeang Thum Khang Tboung ឃុំត្រពាំងធំខាងត្បូង
- Commune (Khum)
- Location within Cambodia
- Coordinates: 11°01′25″N 104°34′29″E
- Country: Cambodia
- Province: Takéo
- District: Tram Kak
- Time zone: UTC+7
- Geocode: 210915

Trapeang Thum Khang Tboung Commune (Khmer: ឃុំត្រពាំងធំខាងត្បូង) is a khum (commune) in Tram Kak District, Takéo Province, Cambodia.

== Administration ==
As of 2019, Trapeang Thum Khang Tboung Commune has 13 phums (villages) as follows.

No.	Code	Khmer	Village
1	21091501	ត្រពាំងកោះ	Trapeang Kaoh
2	21091502	ព្រៃក្ដី	Prey Kdei
3	21091503	ព្រៃរំដួល	Prey Rumduol
4	21091504	ប្រគៀប	Prakieb
5	21091505	ត្រពាំងជ្រៃ	Trapeang Chrey
6	21091506	សំរោង	Samraong
7	21091507	គោចិនលែង	Kou Chen Leaeng
8	21091508	ត្រពាំងតាសោម	Trapeang Ta Saom
9	21091509	ត្រពាំងឈូក	Trapeang Chhuk
10	21091510	ត្រពាំងត្នោត	Trapeang Tnaot
11	21091511	ត្រពាំងប្រីយ៍	Trapeang Prei
12	21091512	ត្រពាំងខន	Trapeang Khan
13	21091513	ព្រៃព្រាល	Prey Preal
