= Popel Commune (Tram Kak District) =

Popel ឃុំពពេល
- Commune (Khum)
- Location within Cambodia
- Coordinates: 11°03′49″N 104°39′27″E
- Country: Cambodia
- Province: Takéo
- District: Tram Kak
- Time zone: UTC+7
- Geocode: 210909

Popel Commune (Khmer: ឃុំពពេល) is a khum (commune) in Tram Kak District, Takéo Province, Cambodia.

== Administration ==
As of 2019, Popel Commune has 12 phums (villages) as follows.

No.	Code	Village	Khmer
1	21090901	Angk Kokir	អង្គគគីរ
2	21090902	Trav Aem	ត្រាវអែម
3	21090903	Ta Set	តាសិត
4	21090904	Prey Chuor	ព្រៃជួរ
5	21090905	Trapeang Kak	ត្រពាំងកក់
6	21090906	Kngaok Pong	ក្ងោកពង
7	21090907	Damnak Roveang	ដំណាក់រវាង
8	21090908	Cham Pol	ចមពល
9	21090909	Trapeang Pring	ត្រពាំងព្រីង
10	21090910	Romiet	រមៀត
11	21090911	Prey Mien	ព្រៃមៀន
12	21090912	Prey Chheu Teal	ព្រៃឈើទាល
