= Trapeang Thum Khang Cheung Commune =

Trapeang Thum Khang Cheung ឃុំត្រពាំងធំខាងជើង
- Commune (Khum)
- Location within Cambodia
- Coordinates: 11°03′00″N 104°34′11″E
- Country: Cambodia
- Province: Takéo
- District: Tram Kak
- Time zone: UTC+7
- Geocode: 210914

Trapeang Thum Khang Cheung Commune (Khmer: ឃុំត្រពាំងធំខាងជើង) is a khum (commune) in Tram Kak District, Takéo Province, Cambodia.

== Administration ==
As of 2019, Trapeang Thum Khang Cheung Commune has 11 phums (villages) as follows.

No.	Code	Village	Khmer
1	21091401	Peak Bang'aong	ពាក់បង្អោង
2	21091402	Prey Khvav	ព្រៃខ្វាវ
3	21091403	Trapeang Svay	ត្រពាំងស្វាយ
4	21091404	Ta Suon	តាសួន
5	21091405	Prey Kduoch	ព្រៃក្ដួច
6	21091406	Prey Ta Lei	ព្រៃតាឡី
7	21091407	Samrang	សំរ៉ង
8	21091408	Angk Trav	អង្គត្រាវ
9	21091409	Pou Doh	ពោធិដុះ
10	21091410	Prey Sbat	ព្រៃស្បាត
11	21091411	Prey Dak Por	ព្រៃដក់ពរ
