= Srae Ronoung Commune =

Srae Ronoung ឃុំស្រែរនោង
- Commune (Khum)
- Location within Cambodia
- Coordinates: 10°56′44″N 104°41′48″E
- Country: Cambodia
- Province: Takéo
- District: Tram Kak
- Time zone: UTC+7
- Geocode: 210911

Srae Ronoung Commune (Khmer: ឃុំស្រែរនោង) is a khum (commune) in Tram Kak District, Takéo Province, Cambodia.

== Administration ==
As of 2019, Srae Ronoung Commune has 17 phums (villages) as follows.

No.	Code	Village	Khmer
1	21091101	Pravoney	ប្រវន័យ
2	21091102	Trapeang Thnal	ត្រពាំងថ្នល់
3	21091103	Chrey Veng (~Veaeng)	ជ្រៃវែង
4	21091104	Sameakki	សាមគ្គី
5	21091105	Trapeang Ronoung	ត្រពាំងរនោង
6	21091106	Trach	ត្រាច
7	21091107	Kouk Rovieng	គោករវៀង
8	21091108	Thum	ធំ
9	21091109	Ta Kaev	តាកែវ
10	21091110	Krang Svay	ក្រាំងស្វាយ
11	21091111	Trapeang Robaeum	ត្រពាំងរបើម
12	21091112	Thmei	ថ្មី
13	21091113	Prachum	ប្រជុំ
14	21091114	Srae Chheu Nieng	ស្រែឈើនៀង
15	21091115	Prey Mouk	ព្រៃមោក
16	21091116	Srae Thlok	ស្រែថ្លុក
17	21091117	Trapeang Tomloab	ត្រពាំងទម្លាប់
