= Nhaeng Nhang Commune =

Nhaeng Nhang ឃុំញ៉ែងញ៉ង
- Commune (Khum)
- Location within Cambodia
- Coordinates: 10°55′26″N 104°38′51″E
- Country: Cambodia
- Province: Takéo
- District: Tram Kak
- Time zone: UTC+7
- Geocode: 210905

Nhaeng Nhang Commune (Khmer: ឃុំញ៉ែងញ៉ង) is a khum (commune) in Tram Kak District, Takéo Province, Cambodia.

== Administration ==
As of 2019, Nhaeng Nhang Commune has 11 phums (villages) as follows.

No.	Code	Village	Khmer
1	21090501	Doun Tuot	ដូនទួត
2	21090502	Soutey	សូទៃ
3	21090503	Kranhung	ក្រញូង
4	21090504	Trapeang Snao	ត្រពាំងស្នោ
5	21090505	Kus	គុស
6	21090506	Slaeng Kaong	ស្លែងកោង
7	21090507	Ta Tai	តាតៃ
8	21090508	Ruessei Srok	ឫស្សីស្រុក
9	21090509	Angk Ta Saom	អង្គតាសោម
10	21090510	Our Sngaeun	អូរស្ងើន
11	21090511	Kamsei	កំសី
