= Trapeang Kranhung Commune =

Trapeang Kranhung ឃុំត្រពាំងក្រញូង
- Commune (Khum)
- Location within Cambodia
- Coordinates: 11°06′11″N 104°26′59″E
- Country: Cambodia
- Province: Takéo
- District: Tram Kak
- Time zone: UTC+7
- Geocode: 210907

Trapeang Kranhung Commune (Khmer: ឃុំត្រពាំងក្រញូង) is a khum (commune) in Tram Kak District, Takéo Province, Cambodia.

== Administration ==
As of 2019, Trapeang Kranhung Commune has 9 phums (villages) as follows.

No.	Code	Village	Khmer
1	21090701	Khpob Svay	ខ្ពបស្វាយ
2	21090702	Trapeang Chak	ត្រពាំងចក
3	21090703	Trapeang Skea	ត្រពាំងស្គា
4	21090704	Trapeang Robang	ត្រពាំងរបង
5	21090705	Trapeang Kranhung	ត្រពាំងក្រញូង
6	21090706	Prey Kduoch	ព្រៃក្ដួច
7	21090707	Phlov Louk	ផ្លូវលោក
8	21090708	Prey Talouy	ព្រៃតាឡូយ
9	21090709	Boss Taphong	បុស្សតាផង់
