= Samraong Commune (Tram Kak District) =

Samraong ឃុំសំរោង
- Commune (Khum)
- Location within Cambodia
- Coordinates: 10°59′05″N 104°34′44″E
- Country: Cambodia
- Province: Takéo
- District: Tram Kak
- Time zone: UTC+7
- Geocode: 210910

Samraong Commune (Khmer: ឃុំសំរោង) is a khum (commune) in Tram Kak District, Takéo Province, Cambodia.

== Administration ==
As of 2019, Samraong Commune has 16 phums (villages) as follows.

No.	Code	Village	Khmer
1	21091001	Trapeang Chaeng	ត្រពាំងចែង
2	21091002	Kaoh Nhai	កោះញ៉ៃ
3	21091003	Krabei Prey	ក្របីព្រៃ
4	21091004	Chan Teab	ចានទាប
5	21091005	Trapeang Chhuk	ត្រពាំងឈូក
6	21091006	Krang Banteay	ក្រាំងបន្ទាយ
7	21091007	Pong Tuek	ពងទឹក
8	21091008	Paen Meas	ប៉ែនមាស
9	21091009	Ta Sman	តាស្មន់
10	21091010	Prey Ta Dok	ព្រៃតាដុក
11	21091011	Prasout Thmei	ប្រសូតថ្មី
12	21091012	Trapeang Thma	ត្រពាំងថ្ម
13	21091013	Ta Saom	តាសោម
14	21091014	Prey Kokir	ព្រៃគគីរ
15	21091015	Ta Paen	តាប៉ែន
16	21091016	Sambuor	សំបួរ
