= Le brothers =

American martial artists

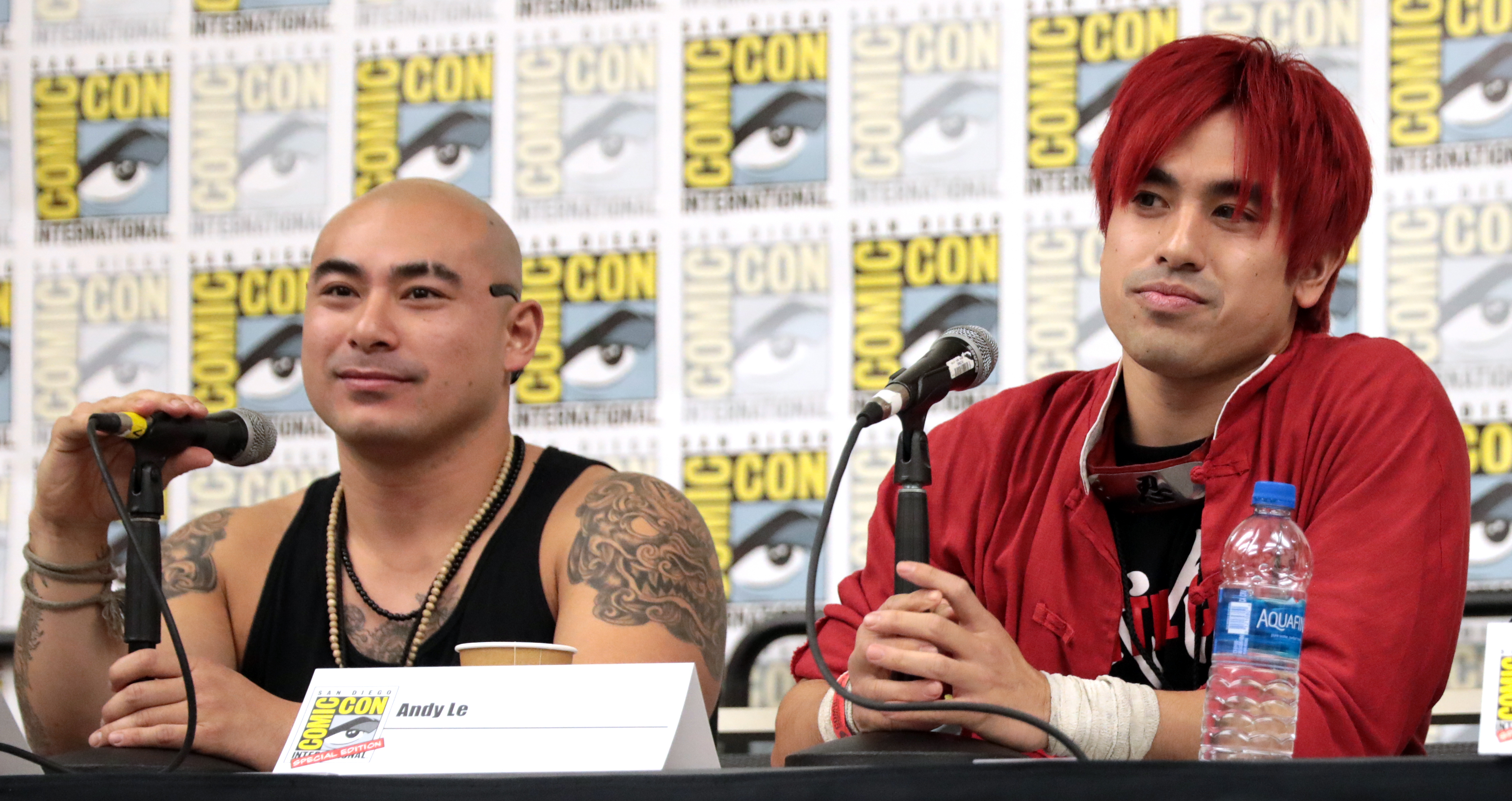
- Brian (left) and Andy Le at the 2021 San Diego Comic-Con
- Occupations: Actors; martial artists
- Years active: 2012–present
- Andy Le
- Born: Andy Le; 1991 or 1992 (age 34–35); Orange County, California, U.S.
- Brian Le
- Born: Brian Le; 1993 or 1994 (age 32–33); Orange County, California, U.S.

Andy Le (/ˈliː/, LEE; born 1991 or 1992) and Brian Le (born 1993 or 1994) are American actors, action choreographers, and martial artists. Born to Vietnamese immigrant parents in Orange County, the brothers taught themselves martial arts through watching YouTube videos and kung fu films. Around 2012, they co-founded the YouTube channel Martial Club with friend Daniel Mah and began uploading their own martial arts videos. Through their channel, the Le brothers were eventually discovered by Hollywood.

The brothers participated in the Academy Award-winning film Everything Everywhere All at Once (2022) as actors and choreographers. Individually, Andy played Death Dealer in the Marvel Cinematic Universe film Shang-Chi and the Legend of the Ten Rings (2021), while Brian starred as Ho in the Hong Kong action film The Furious (2025).

== Early life and family ==
The Le brothers were born to parents who fled from Vietnam after the Vietnam War to the United States in 1985, where they found work selling kitchenware in Santa Ana. Andy was born in 1991 or 1992, and Brian in 1993 or 1994. The Orange County natives grew up in the Little Saigon of Westminster, and graduated from La Quinta High School. They were introduced to Hong Kong martial arts films by their father, which inspired the two to take up martial arts. As their family could not afford formal classes, the brothers taught themselves through watching YouTube videos and kung fu films. Brian said he had learned by watching and studying Shaw Brothers and Golden Harvest films frame-by-frame, and credited Fist of Fury starring Donnie Yen as his greatest inspiration. Their method of learning caused them to develop an eclectic fighting style consisting of several different international fighting styles.

== Career ==
=== Martial Club ===
2012 video of Andy Le tricking at the White Lotus Closing Gathering in Los Angeles

The Le brothers formed the stunt team Martial Club alongside friend Daniel Mah, whom they had met at a local gym while still in high school. Around 2012, the Le brothers started posting videos to the team's YouTube channel depicting recreations of fight scenes from action films, including Fist of Fury, based on the 1972 film of the same name, and The Intercepting Fist, a tribute to the 2008 film Ip Man. They have also shared footage of training sessions with friends and behind-the-scenes footage from film sets. According to Charles Thorp of InsideHook, the trio "showed impressive skills when it came to producing and performing technical fight choreography" and the channel quickly grew to receive millions of views and fans. As of September 2021, the channel had accumulated more than 700,000 subscribers.

=== Entertainment ===
Brian first entered the entertainment industry as a stunt double for the TV series Into the Badlands between 2017 and 2018, while Andy collaborated with Jackie Chan for a WildAid commercial in 2018. The brothers appeared together in the 2020 action comedy film The Paper Tigers, playing the first group of fighters the protagonists face. Through the YouTube channel, Andy received the attention of stunt coordinator Brad Allan in early 2019. This led to him being initially hired as a martial arts trainer for Simu Liu on Shang-Chi and the Legend of the Ten Rings (2021), and later an acting role in the film itself as the supervillain Death Dealer. The Martial Club channel furthermore caught the attention of the Daniels directing duo, who hired the two Le brothers as stunt coordinators for the film Everything Everywhere All at Once (2022), in which they also played acting roles as the Alpha Jumpers. Derek Smith of Slant Magazine praised the choreography as "elegantly and humorously choreographed", offering "something truly fresh and unexpected with seemingly every punch or kick that is thrown"; while Inverse critic Isaac Feldberg described their action as tributes to "Shaw Brothers and Golden Harvest kung-fu films" that is "playful, bar-raising". Both of them were nominated for Best Fight at the 2023 Taurus World Stunt Awards for their choreography.

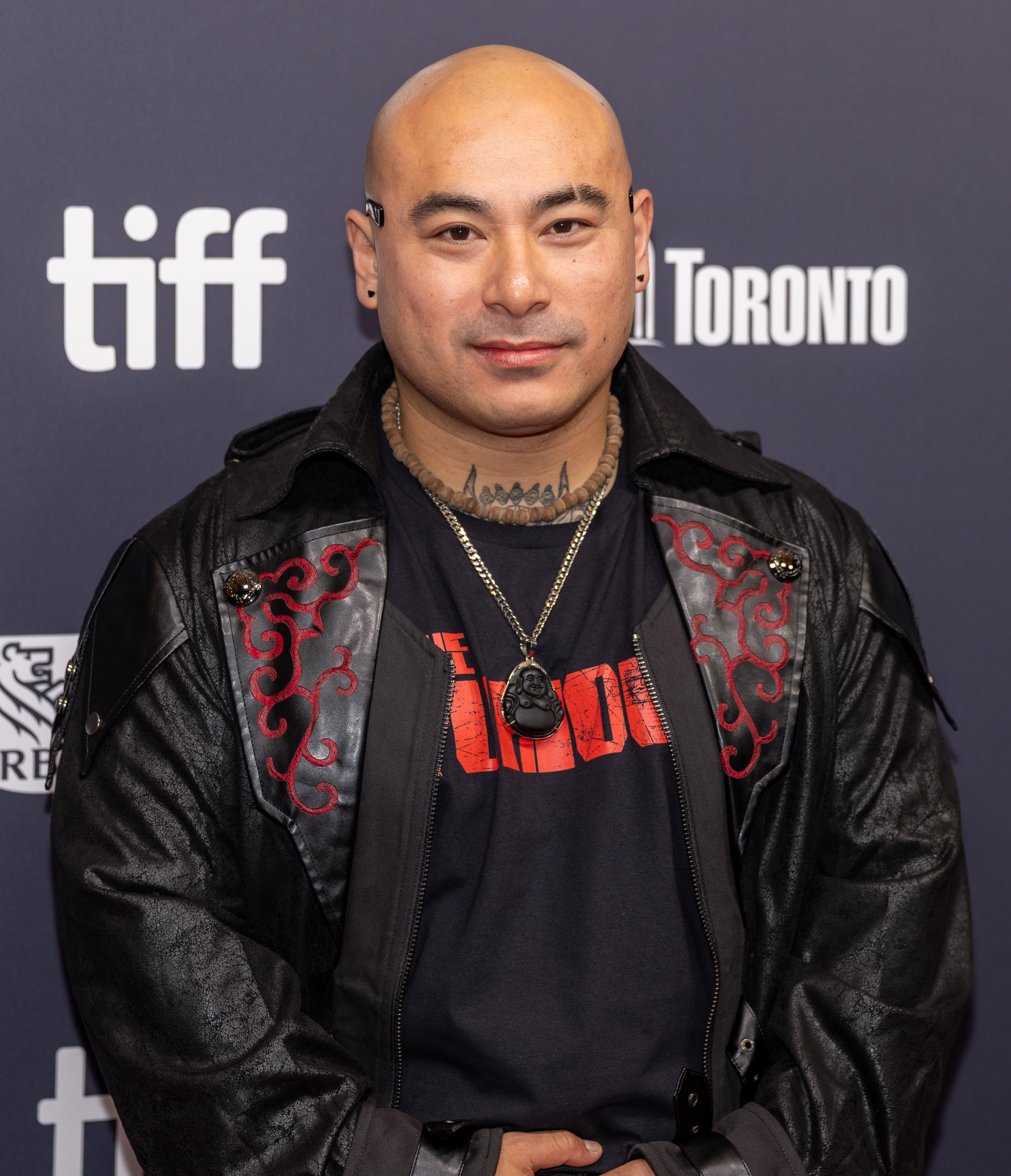
Brian Le at the premiere of The Furious during the 2025 TIFF

Following Everything Everywhere All at Once, Brian reunited with some fellow cast members in the Disney+ series American Born Chinese, where he played Zhu Bajie, one of the companions of the Monkey King (played by Daniel Wu). The brothers also served as action choreographers for the Netflix series The Brothers Sun, in which they also played the characters JC Wang and Justin Wang, and they starred in the direct-to-digital action film Gladiator Underground (2025). Brian then landed a lead role in the 2025 English-language Hong Kong action film The Furious, where he played Ho, a human trafficker henchman. Film critic Matt Zoller Seitz called him his "favorite character in a movie packed with great characters" due to his "make him cry, and he'll make you die" nature; while Chris Mello of InReview found his character to be "especially funny, as his gigantic bruiser character is both the most physically imposing person in the film and its goofiest creation".
