= Ta Phem Commune =

Ta Phem ឃុំតាភេម
- Commune (Khum)
- Location within Cambodia
- Coordinates: 11°01′01″N 104°37′49″E
- Country: Cambodia
- Province: Takéo
- District: Tram Kak
- Time zone: UTC+7
- Geocode: 210912

Ta Phem Commune (Khmer: ឃុំតាភេម) is a khum (commune) in Tram Kak District, Takéo Province, Cambodia.

== Administration ==
As of 2019, Ta Phem Commune has 23 phums (villages) as follows.

No.	Code	Village	Khmer
1	21091201	Mrum	ម្រុំ
2	21091202	Trapeang Ampil	ត្រពាំងអំពិល
3	21091203	Ta Moch	តាម៉ុច
4	21091204	Angk Kokir	អង្គគគីរ
5	21091205	Ta Phem	តាភេម
6	21091206	Ta Sou	តាសូ
7	21091207	Khla Krohuem	ខ្លាគ្រហឹម
8	21091208	Li Nha	លីញ៉ា
9	21091209	Prasung	ប្រស៊ូង
10	21091210	Tbaeng Totueng	ត្បែងទទឹង
11	21091211	Ou Phot	អូរផុត
12	21091212	Moha Sena	មហាសេនា
13	21091213	Nang Sray	ណងស្រាយ
14	21091214	Ta Koam	តាគាំ
15	21091215	Pou Preah Sang	ពោធិ៍ព្រះសង្ឃ
16	21091216	Trapeang Kabbas	ត្រពាំងកប្បាស
17	21091217	Trapeang Svay	ត្រពាំងស្វាយ
18	21091218	Ba Khong Khang Kaeut	បាខុងខាងកើត
19	21091219	Ba Khong Khang Lech	បាខុងខាងលិច
20	21091220	Ta Mom	តាមុំ
21	21091221	Pravong	ប្រវង់
22	21091222	Prey Chheu Teal	ព្រៃឈើទាល
23	21091223	Ta Koem	តាកឹម
