= Our Saray Commune =

Our Saray ឃុំអូរសារាយ
- Commune (Khum)
- Location within Cambodia
- Coordinates: 11°04′13″N 104°31′06″E
- Country: Cambodia
- Province: Takéo
- District: Tram Kak
- Time zone: UTC+7
- Geocode: 210906

Our Saray Commune (Khmer: ឃុំអូរសារាយ) is a khum (commune) in Tram Kak District, Takéo Province, Cambodia.

== Administration ==
As of 2019, Our Saray Commune has 12 phums (villages) as follows.

No.	Code	Village	Khmer
1	21090601	Trapeang Dang Tuek	ត្រពាំងដងទឹក
2	21090602	Tuol Khlong	ទួលខ្លុង
3	21090603	Sokram	សុក្រំ
4	21090604	Trapeang Krasang	ត្រពាំងក្រសាំង
5	21090605	Trapeang Kralanh	ត្រពាំងក្រឡាញ់
6	21090606	Boeng Satong	បឹងសាទង
7	21090607	Trapeang Phlu	ត្រពាំងភ្លូ
8	21090608	Trapeang Khchau	ត្រពាំងខ្ចៅ
9	21090609	Damnak Khlong	ដំណាក់ខ្លុង
10	21090610	Stueng	ស្ទឹង
11	21090611	Ruessei Muoy Kump	ឫស្សីមួយគុម្ព
12	21090615	Tnaot Chum	ត្នោតជុំ
