= Mao Ayuth =

Cambodian filmmaker and politician (1944–2021)

- ម៉ៅ អាយុទ្ធ
- Born: 8 July 1944; Srey Santhor, Kampong Cham, Cambodia, French Indochina
- Died: 15 April 2021 (aged 76); Phnom Penh, Cambodia
- Occupations: Filmmaker; politician
- Years active: 1965–2021
- Spouse: So Samony

Mao Ayuth (Khmer: ម៉ៅ អាយុទ្ធ; 8 July 1944 – 15 April 2021) was a Cambodian filmmaker and politician. One of the few filmmakers to survive the Khmer Rouge regime, he was noted, alongside Dy Saveth, Yvon Hem, and Bun Yim, as connecting contemporary Cambodian cinema with its golden age of the 1960s and 1970s. He died during the COVID-19 pandemic.

== Early life and career ==
Mao Ayuth was born on 8 July 1944 in Srey Sonthor District, Kampong Cham Province, in what was then the French protectorate of Cambodia.

After graduating from a screenwriting programme in 1965, Ayuth began his career as an assistant at National Television of Cambodia, going on to become a programme director. In the 1970s, he moved to France to study filmmaking after receiving a stipend from the Office de Radiodiffusion Télévision Française.

While in France, Ayuth started developing what would become his first film, Bet Phnek, Hek Trung (បិទភ្នែក ហែកទ្រូង; "Close My Eyes, Open My Heart"). Following a Cambodian man who returns home from France following the murder of his brother and falls in love with his widow, the film was released in 1975 and was among the last films to screen in cinemas prior to the rise of the Khmer Rouge. Only one copy of the film was made, which was lost when Phnom Penh fell on 17 April 1975.

During the Khmer Rouge regime, in which most artists and intellectuals were killed, Ayuth successfully hid his identity as a filmmaker by pretending to be a wedding photographer. During this time, he worked as a peasant, fisherman, and labourer.

After the fall of the Khmer Rouge in 1979, Ayuth established the governmental Department of Cinema alongside Ieu Pannakar. He initially intended to return to filmmaking, but the lack of funding for the arts following the collapse of the regime meant that his second film was not released until 1988. Chet Chang Cham (ចិត្តចងចាំ; "I Want to Remember") followed a man trying to survive the Khmer Rouge regime, and was popular among Cambodian audiences.

== Later life and politics ==
In 1993, following a period working as director of National Television of Cambodia, Ayuth was appointed secretary of state in the Ministry of Information. During his tenure, he continued to produce art, including films, music videos, television programmes, novels, and poems. He also served for a period as president of the Association of Television Stations of Cambodia.

Mao Ayuth's biggest successes included Nesat Krapeu (នេសាទក្រពើ; "The Crocodile"), released in 2005 and documenting a man who seeks to hunt for the mythical Crocodile King after his family are killed by crocodiles. The film was commercially successful and continues to be periodically re-released in Cambodian cinemas.

Ayuth's final film, the historical drama Luong Preah Sdech Korn (ហ្លួងព្រះស្ដេចកន), was released in 2016.

At the time of his death, Ayuth was developing a government-funded television series documenting the film of Hun Sen, the Prime Minister of Cambodia.

== Personal life and death ==
Ayuth was married to So Samony and had four daughters and one son. He lived in Phnom Penh.

Ayuth died on 15 April 2021, in Khmer-Soviet Friendship Hospital in Phnom Penh at the age of 76. A spokesperson from the Ministry of Information stated he had died of complications from COVID-19. Following his death, Hun Sen paid tribute to him and expressed his condolences to Mao Ayuth's family.
