= Karmalink =

2021 science fiction film

- Promotional release poster
- Directed by: Jake Wachtel
- Written by: Jake Wachtel; Christopher Larsen
- Produced by: Valerie Steinberg; Sok Visal; Christopher Rompre
- Starring: Leng Heng Prak; Srey Leak Chhith
- Cinematography: Robert Leitzell
- Edited by: Harrison Atkins; Stephanie Kaznocha
- Music by: Ariel Marx
- Production company: Valerie Steinberg Productions
- Distributed by: XYZ Films; LevelK
- Release date: 2021
- Running time: 102 minutes
- Countries: Cambodia; United States
- Languages: Khmer; English

Karmalink is a 2021 science fiction film directed and co-written by Jake Wachtel in his feature film directorial debut. An international co-production of Cambodia and the United States, it is the first Cambodian-produced science fiction film. It stars Leng Heng Prak and Srey Leak Chhith in their acting debuts, who also worked with Wachtel and co-writer Christopher Larsen on developing the story and translating it into Khmer. The film is dedicated to lead actor Leng Heng Prak, who died before its completion.

== Synopsis ==
In a near future Phnom Penh, a community is threatened with eviction to make way for a bullet train service to China. The wealthy use nanotechnology to "augment" their experiences. At night, Leng Heng dreams of his previous lives and of a solid gold Buddha, which he is convinced will help prevent his family from being evicted. He and orphan street child Srey Leak begin a search for the Buddha in the hope it will protect their community.

== Production ==
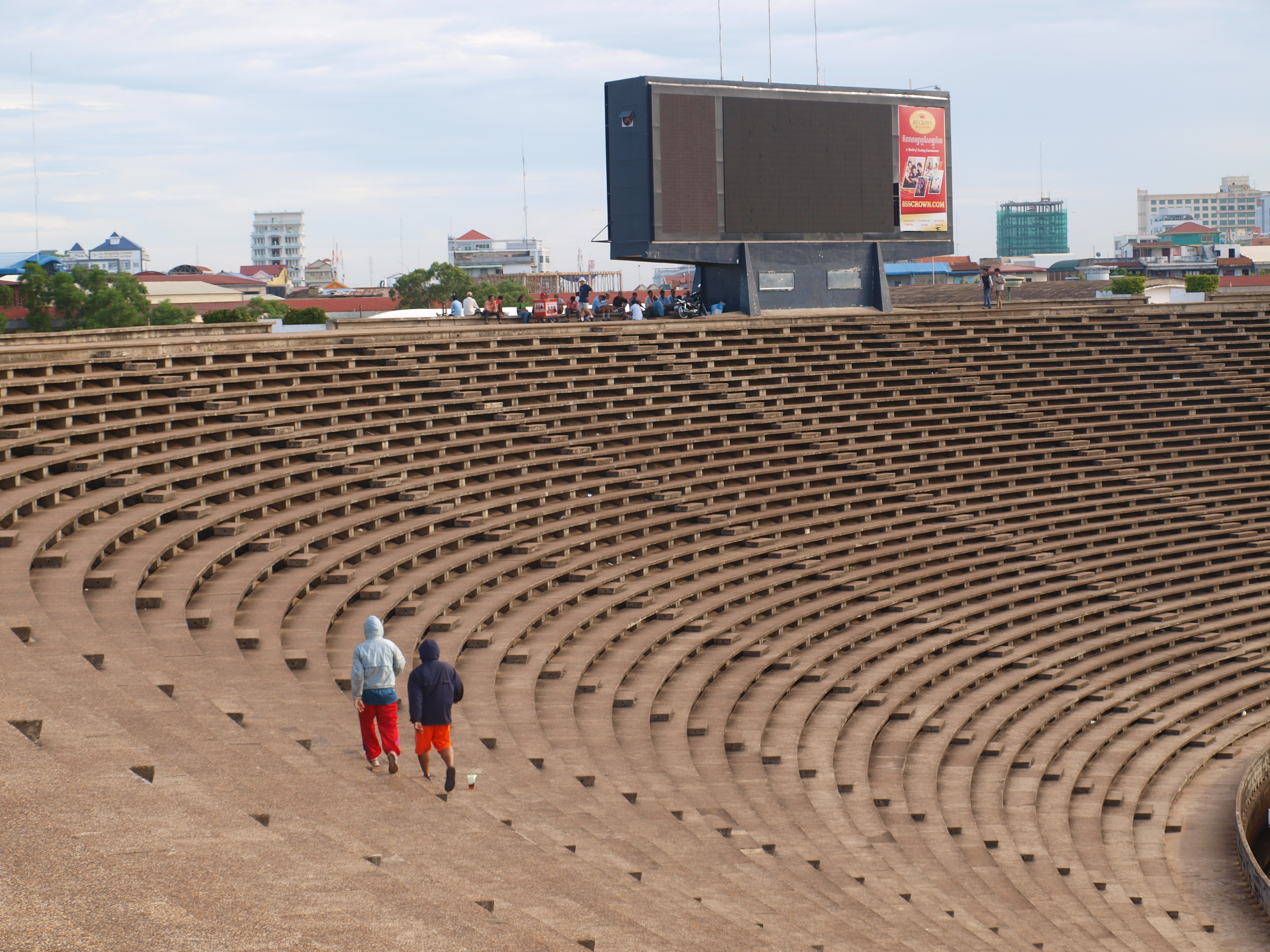
Phnom Penh Olympic Stadium, one of the shooting locations

Wachtel, an American, wrote and directed the film after moving to Cambodia in 2014 and working with local students as part of Filmmakers Without Borders. Inspired by Kazuo Ishiguro's novel Never Let Me Go, Wachtel devised a science fiction story set in Phnom Penh in the near future. Two of Wachtel's students, Leng Heng Prak and Srey Leak Chhith, were the inspiration for the main characters. They were later cast in the film to play them. Karmalink is mostly set in the Tralop Bek district of Phnom Penh, where both actors grew up.

The film's themes draw on Buddhist concepts of karma and rebirth, as well as artificial intelligence and economic inequality. Wachtel spent several years honing the script, working with Cambodian friends and colleagues to ensure local culture was adequately reflected. The displacement of 4,000 families around Boeung Kak also served as inspiration for the story. The film was primarily shot in Phnom Penh over 37 days. Shooting locations include Phnom Penh railway station and Olympic Stadium.

During the film's editing, lead actor Leng Heng Prak died. The film is dedicated to his memory.

== Release ==
Karmalink had its world premiere as the opening night film of the 2021 Venice Film Festival's Critics' Week, and it also screened at many other festivals including the Austin Film Festival, Singapore International Film Festival, Santa Fe International Film Festival, Sun Valley Film Festival, and Glasgow Film Festival. The film had a theatrical release in the United States on July 15, 2022, and it was released in Cambodia on February 17, 2023.

== Reception ==
On the review aggregator website Rotten Tomatoes, the film has an approval rating of 89% based on 19 critics' reviews, with an average rating of 7.0/10. Metacritic, which uses a weighted average, assigned the film a score of 73 out of 100, based on 4 critics, indicating "generally favorable reviews".

Richard Kuipers gave the film a positive review in Variety, praising its filming locations, themes, musical score and performances. In Screen Rant, Nadir Samara commended the cinematography and production design, but critiqued the dialogue and execution of its themes, concluding that the film was "beautifully imperfect". Wendy Ide in Screen Daily also praised the film's worldbuilding and the central performances from its nonprofessional actors, concluding that "While the first two acts are more engaging and accessible than the third – the picture does get a little bogged down in its effects and ideas – there's no question that this is an imaginative and original debut from director Jake Wachtel."
