= Cheat Satrey =

1997 Cambodian TV soap opera

- Also known as: Cheat Chea Satrei; Jeat Satrey
- Genre: Soap opera
- Created by: Fai Som Ang
- Written by: Fai Som Ang (Head writer)
- Country of origin: Cambodia
- No. of episodes: 24

Production
- Executive producer: Fai Som Ang
- Running time: 45 minutes

Original release
- Network: Cambodian Television Network
- Release: 1997

Cheat Satrey (A Woman's Life) is the first Khmer television soap opera directed. It was directed by Fai Som Ang and starred Pich Saparn, Keo Koliyan, Pich Vong Reksmey, Pong Rottanak, Chea Somnang and many others.

== History ==
Pich Saparn was shot killed by her husband while filming the TV opera, she was 17 at the time. Thus, aside from being the very 1st Khmer TV opera, the film was also her last film 2 other actresses disappeared after the making of this TV series, one of them being the rising actress Pich Vong Reksmey. After years of being in the film industry, pioneering actresses Keo Koliyana and Pan Sopanny were also cast in this same film for the 1st time.
