= List of Cambodian film directors =

== Directors of the 1950s–1975 ==
- Directors of the 1950–1970s not only studied film abroad but brought back great imagery and creativity. As King Norodom Sihanouk was a fan of films himself since a child, he allowed the film industry to hold a huge part in Cambodian daily lives of the Sangkum Reast Niyum.
- Dy Saveth
- Hang Thun Hak
- Heng Tola
- Kong Som Eun
- King Norodom Sihanouk
- Sinn Sisamouth
- Vichara Dany
- Vann Vannak
- Sovann Cheav

== Directors of the 1980s–2010 ==
Since the Khmer Rouge, it took years to recover from the downturn of the film industry. Contributors to this rising film industry included many female directors consisting of: Parn Puong Bopha, Mao Somnang, Pal Vanarirak, Channy Peakdei, and many others. Film directors such as King Norodom Sihanouk and Kong Bunchoeun continued with their career after the fall of the Khmer Rouge.

- Brendan Moriarty
- King Norodom Sihanouk
- Rithy Panh

== Directors of 2010s– ==
- Huy Yaleng
- Leak Lyda

== Directors of 2020s– ==
- Tobiiboii

== See also ==
- List of Cambodian films
- List of Khmer film actors
