= Kone Prosa Srey =

- Also known as: Koun Prosa Srey
- Genre: Soap opera
- Created by: Parn Puong Bopha
- Written by: Parn Puong Bopha (Head writer)
- Starring: Ny Molika
- Country of origin: Cambodia
- No. of episodes: 25

Production
- Executive producer: Parn Puong Bopha
- Running time: 22 minutes

Original release
- Network: Cambodian Television Network
- Release: 2006

Kone Prosa Srey is a 2007 Khmer TV soap opera directed by Parn Puong Bopha starring Duch Sophea. The opera is widely considered as the sparkling flame of Khmer soap operas.

== Critical reception ==
Proving highly successful, the 2006 opera brought a new wave in the Khmer film Industry starting an era of TV operas in 2007.
