= The Crocodile (film) =

- Promotional Poster
- Directed by: Mao Ayuth
- Written by: Mao Ayuth
- Produced by: Mao Ayuth
- Starring: Dy Saveth; Preap Sovath; Sim Solika; Rathanak (Prek)
- Release date: 2005
- Running time: 120 minutes
- Country: Cambodia
- Language: Khmer
- Budget: $100,000

The Crocodile (Khmer: នេសាទក្រពើ, Nésat Krâpeu; lit. 'Crocodile Fishing') is a 2005 Cambodian horror-action film written and directed by Mao Ayuth. It was first released in July 2005 and has periodically returned to Cambodian cinemas since July 2007. It has never been released on DVD or in digital format.

== Plot ==
A group of villagers live by a crocodile-infested river which has claimed the lives of many of their relatives. After losing his wife, family members and neighbours to the crocodiles, local farmer San decides to become a crocodile hunter. His aim is to find and kill the Crocodile King.

== Production and release ==
The film's budget was US$100,000, a high level for a Cambodian production; a significant amount of this went towards the film's lead actor, Preap Sovath. The film was written, produced and directed by Mao Ayuth, who was one of the few filmmakers from the golden age of Cambodian cinema to survive the Khmer Rouge regime. The film was first released in July 2005 in six theatres across Cambodia. It has subsequently been released several more times. As of March 2021, the film has not been released on DVD or streaming platforms; a viral Facebook post asked for the film's release using the hashtag "#releaseនេសាទក្រពើ".

== Awards ==
The Crocodile won six awards at the Khmer National Film Celebration, including Best Movie, Best Director and Best Writer for Mao Ayuth, and Best Actor for Preap Sovath.
