= Reth Tiger =

Cambodian martial artist (born 1998)

- រ៉េត វិសុថាន់,រ៉េត ថៃហ្គឺ
- Born: Visothann Reth; 9 August 1998 (age 28); Tram Kak District, Takéo province, Cambodia
- Occupations: Actor, martial artist, stunt man
- Years active: 2017-present
- Style: Kun Khmer, Yuthkuth Khorm, Kun Labokator
- Height: 1.70 m (5 ft 7 in)

Visothann Reth (Khmer: រ៉េត វិសុថាន់,រ៉េត ថៃហ្គឺ; born 9 August 1998), better known as Tiger Reth, is a Cambodian martial artist, actor and stunt man.

== Early life ==
Reth was born on August 9, 1998, in Ample Village, Leay Bo Commune, Tram Kak District, Takéo province, Cambodia. Reth watched martial arts films as a young child and began to emulate them. He studied martial arts at the local high school(Indratevi High School) in Phnom Penh.

== Work ==
Tiger began his career in film industry and got his start in the cast of the TV program movie series. He has been cast in several films. He starred in the 2017 as Cambodian Action Film . In addition to his art work, he is also a civil servant within the government of the Ministry of Planning in Cambodia. In 2017, he also stunt man appeared in the film First They Killed My Father as Khmer Rouge soldier.

In 2024, Tiger Reth starred in an international film and is also a main character. The movie is titled Phnom Penh Ground Zero. The film stars four main characters: Maurice Chan, Derek Bidaut, Tharoth Sam and Tiger Reth.

=== Martial arts ===
Tiger Reth He has also participated in national and international martial arts shows. He trained Kun khmer (prodalserey), kun khmer boran (yuthakun khorm, kun bokator).

==== National martial art shows ====
- Opening Ceremony of Techo National Heritage Stadium in 2021
- Closing Ceremony of the 3rd National Sports 2022
- Remembrance night program at Angkor Wat temple organized by the Ministry of Culture 2022
- Shadow Night Program Performed at Chao Say Tevta Temple, Organized by the Ministry of Culture 2023

==== International martial art shows ====
- Performed at the 32nd Sea Game Closing and Opening Ceremony in Cambodia 2023

- Performed at the opening ceremony of Asian para game in Cambodia 2023

== Filmography ==
Year	Title	Role	Note	Ref.
2017	Khunchhang Khunpheng	Stunt Man		
2017	Loung Preah Sdech Korn	Right hand guard		
2018	Dai Jhav	Stunt Man		
2019	Komherng Kmeng 1	Fighter Guy		
2019	Komherng Kmeng 2	Best Fighter Guys		
2019	Usual Suspect	Stunt Man / Gang		
2020	Usual Suspect	Horn	TV Series	
2021	The Flag	Green Army Fighter	Short Film	
2021	Anger Tiger Phnom Penh	Black Bodyguard Fighter	Short Film	
2021	The Rewind	Archaeologist	Feature Film	
2022	Monsters	Ros Santhy	Short / Feature	
2022	Gang of Phnom Penh	Tiger	TV Series	
2024	The Last Fight Kun Khmer(Post production)	Chakra	Feature Film	
2024	Neath Love Story	Stunt Man	Feature Film	
2024	Phnom Penh Ground Zero (Post production)	Agent Vichet	Short Film	
2024	Neath Love Story 2	Stunt Man	Feature Film	
2024	Lady Noir	Kong	Feature Film	
	Bullet Storm	Joe	Short Film	
2025	Phnom Penh Ground Zero (Script development)	Agent Vichet	Feature Film	
2026	Banh	Sothsa	Feature Film	
2026	Permanent Driver	Chanthy	Feature Film	
2027	Heat Wave ( Coming Soon )	Borey	Feature Film	
