= Crocodile Man =

- Promotional poster
- Directed by: Hui Keung
- Written by: Hui Keung
- Produced by: Hui Keung
- Starring: Dy Saveth; Sok Sam Eak; Pen Ran; Meas Samon
- Distributed by: Phra Chan Ni Ko films
- Release date: 1972
- Country: Cambodia
- Language: Khmer

Crocodile Man (Kropeu Charavan in Khmer, also known as Kraithong Krapeu Chalawon in Thai or A Water Warrior and a Crocodile Man) is a widely acclaimed Cambodian horror film released in 1972 by Hui Keung. It starred Khmer actress Dy Saveth and singer Pen Ran, two iconic figures of Cambodian culture of the time. It was released in Thailand and Hong Kong along with another 1972 Khmer film, The Snake King's Wife, which brought back a successful grossing. It has become one of the more enduring creations from the nation's pre-communist era and copies are still sold today with English and Chinese subtitles.

== Plot ==
The story is based on the Thai folk lore, "Legend of Kraithong." The relationship of two students who were taught by the same teacher (Ta Esey) for fighting lessons were suddenly split by the fact that each accused the other of being a murderer. Charavann, one of the students who could turn into a crocodile, went under water where he was taught by a water hermit and married two beautiful crocodile girls. He went back to the land in order to seek revenge on Kraitoung, the other student, for killing a woman. One day he took a beautiful daughter of a millionaire, Sompiov Meas, underwater with him, instead of marrying her. However, his two wives refused and put a spell on Sampov Meas. To save Sampov Meas with the intent of marrying her, Kraitoung went underwater to rescue her after many warriors were killed attempting to save the millionaire's daughter. He killed Charavan and his wives for their cruel actions and saved Sampov Meas safely. For his prize, finally, Kraitoung married Sampov Meas, also her sister, Sampov Keav, and lived happily ever after.
