= Jailbreak (2017 film) =

- Jailbreak poster
- Directed by: Jimmy Henderson
- Written by: Jimmy Henderson; Michael Hodgson
- Produced by: Loy Te, for Kongchak Pictures
- Starring: Jean-Paul Ly; Dara Our; Tharoth Sam; Céline Tran; Savin Phillip; Dara Phang; Reth Tiger
- Cinematography: Godefroy Ryckewaert
- Music by: Kmeng Khmer; Fabio Guglielmo Anastasi
- Release date: 31 January 2017
- Running time: 100 minutes
- Country: Cambodia
- Languages: Khmer; English; French
- Budget: $260,000

Jailbreak (Khmer: ការពារឧក្រិដ្ឋជន, Kapéa Ŭkrĕdthâchôn; lit. 'Protect Criminals') is a 2017 Cambodian action film directed by Jimmy Henderson. It was released in Cambodia in January 2017 and made available on Netflix in May 2018.

== Plot ==
The Cambodian police arrest a mobster known as Playboy (Savin Phillip), whom they assume to be the leader of the notorious Butterfly gang. Three local cops (Dara Our, Tharoth Sam and Dara Phang), and a French-Cambodian police officer on an exchange scheme (Jean-Paul Ly), escort Playboy to prison. The mobster reveals that he is not the gang's true boss, and promises to deliver information about his employer. Leaning that Playboy is about to squeal, the gang's real leader, Madame Butterfly (Céline Tran), puts a bounty on her accomplice's head. This sparks a riot in the jail, with all the prisoners trying to get their hands on Playboy.

The police officers, who were on their way out of the prison as the riot began, have to fight against the inmates to save their lives and protect their key witness. Meanwhile, Madame Butterfly and her henchwomen come to the prison in order to finish the job themselves.

== Cast ==
- Jean-Paul Ly as Jean-Paul
- Dara Our as Dara
- Tharoth Sam as Tharoth
- Céline Tran as Madame Butterfly
- Savin Phillip as Playboy
- Laurent Plancel as Suicide
- Dara Phang as Sucheat
- Sisowath Siriwudd as Bolo
- Rous Mony as Scar
- Eh Phuthong as the cannibal
- Kong Ka Chan as Butterfly Gang Member
- Dy Sonita as Butterfly Gang Member
- Chiva Pech as Butterfly Gang Member
- Georgina Tan as Butterfly Gang Member
- Sok Visal as Colonel Pros
- Reth Tiger as Gang Member

== Production ==
Jailbreak is part of an effort by French-Cambodian producer Loy Te to revitalize Cambodian cinema by proposing different genres than the usual romantic comedies and ghost stories. His company, Kongchak Pictures, produced in 2013 the horror film Run, and in 2015 the action thriller Hanuman, the latter being directed by Italian expatriate Jimmy Henderson.

After finishing Hanuman, Henderson started to write an "ensemble action film" with the idea of keeping the action in one location. The cast features Dara Our, who had already played the male lead in Hanuman, Cambodian female MMA champion Tharoth Sam, French-Cambodian stuntman Jean-Paul Ly, and former adult star Céline Tran (AKA Katsuni), making her action film debut. The film highlights the Cambodian martial art of bokator and also features slapstick humor. Website Impact Online wrote during production that Jailbreak "may well do to do for Cambodia what The Raid did for Indonesia". The fight scenes were choreographed by Dara Our and Jean-Paul Ly and the score was composed by Fabio Guglielmo Anastasi and by popular Cambodian rap duo Kmeng Khmer.

== Release ==
Jailbreak was released in Cambodia on 31 January 2017, benefiting from an intensive marketing campaign which also relied on viral techniques. The film was adapted into a video game for mobile phones, which was downloaded in Cambodia by 58000 people at the time of the film's release.

The film debuted to sold-out shows in Cambodian cities and enjoyed positive reception from the audience. Its performance at the Cambodian box office was exceptional for a local production. Shortly after the film's release, it was selected for the Cambodia International Film Festival. It quickly secured sales in other Asian countries such as China and South Korea.

=== Local reception ===
English-language newspaper Khmer Times called Jailbreak an efficient film which owed much to the "naturally kinetic nature of bokator", and concluded that as "an ambitious film for Cambodia", "'Jailbreak' for the most part succeeds in delivering what could be described as the first Khmer action film" and was "sure to do its country proud". The Phnom Penh Post wrote that Jailbreak "could be a defining moment in the growth of Khmer cinema", calling it a "slickly produced and genre-busting" film and "a celebration of what Cambodia has to offer".

=== International release and reception ===
In July 2017, Jailbreak was shown in Montreal at the Fantasia International Film Festival. Variety wrote that, despite a few "minor quibbles" such as "running slightly out of narrative steam in the final furlong", the film benefited from "Henderson’s high-energy direction and an appealing central cast that deliver credible dramatic performances alongside dynamic physical feats". The festival's jury awarded the film a special prize in the action category, "for its inspired fight and camera choreography" and for achieving "a rare and innovative alchemy between camera and cast, that transforms the operator from observer to literal combatant". The audience gave it the Bronze award in the "Most Innovative Feature Film" category.

The French newspaper Le Monde gave the film a positive review, calling it a "leap forward for Cambodian cinema" and praising its use of strong female characters. The Hollywood Reporter compared Jailbreak to Thailand's Ong-Bak and Indonesia's The Raid, praised its imaginative action scenes and concluded that, despite some "old-school flaws" and a tendency to sag in its third act, the film was "a powerful and visceral showcase of the talent and technical expertise" of Cambodia's budding film industry.

Screen Anarchy called the film "an exceptional addition to martial arts cinema", finding it technically "tremendous" and giving special praise to the fight scene between Tharoth Sam and Céline Tran.

Distribution rights to Jailbreak outside Asia were eventually acquired by Netflix, which released it in May 2018.

== Accolades ==
- Fantasia International Film Festival:
  - Action! Award, Mention (special prize)
  - Audience Awards, Bronze prize for Most Innovative Feature Film

== See also ==
- Cinema of Cambodia
