= Filmmakers Without Borders =

Filmmakers Without Borders (FWB) is a registered 501(c)(3) non-profit organization that sends filmmakers and art educators overseas to teach film, media, and technology to students in Africa, Asia, and Latin America.

== Fellowship program ==
Filmmakers Without Borders provides fully funded fellowships to filmmakers, anthropologists, and educators. Fellows live and teach overseas for one academic year.
