= Lost Loves (film) =

2010 film

Lost Loves ឃ្លាតទៅសែនឆ្ងាយ
- Directed by: Chhay Bora ឆាយ បូរ៉ា
- Written by: Kauv Southeary; Chhay Bora
- Produced by: Chhay Bora
- Starring: Kauv Southeary
- Release date: 26 October 2010
- Country: Cambodia
- Language: Khmer

Lost Loves (ឃ្លាតទៅសែនឆ្ងាយ, Khléat Tŏu Sên Chhngay) is a 2010 Cambodian drama film directed by Chhay Bora and is based on real events. It is the first Cambodian film in more than 20 years to deal with the brutalities during the Khmer Rouge era. Lost Loves was selected as the Cambodian entry for the Best Foreign Language Oscar at the 85th Academy Awards, but it did not make the final shortlist. It is only the second Cambodian film to be listed for the Best Foreign Language Oscar. The film made its premiere at the 2010 Cambodia International Film Festival.

== Plot ==
Nun Amara is a woman that fights to survive with her family during the brutal Khmer Rouge regimen (1975-1979) that pushed the entire Cambodian population to forced work in the rice fields and caused the death of more than 1,700,000 persons though mass executions, torture, starvation and deceases.

Although she tries to keep the fortitude, she sees how her dear ones are tore off from her side starting with her own father with impotence before a system that is indifferent to the human feelings and personal dramas and the fear to be the next to fall to. Her father, General Prang, is executed 15 days after the Khmer Rouge took Phnom Penh on 17 April 1975. Amara looks for her husband in the middle of the chaos and the permanent threat of the Khmer Rouge cadres that behave with much cruelty with the people. Somebody tells her that they saw her husband, Chak, being brought away for execution. With lack of food and medicines, her children suffered malnutrition. In 1976 her older daughter gets a permission to see her, but when she arrived to the camp, Amara has been moved to another place. The girl moves by boat looking for her mother, but the boat, over-loaded, capsized and the girl died. Two of her boys died.

In 1979, the year of the fall of the Khmer Rouge regime, Nun Amara ends with only a son and a daughter surviving the nightmare. One of them, Kauv Sotheary, is the wife of director Chhay Bora, who wrote and starred the film.

== Cast ==
- Kauv Southeary as Nun Sila

== See also ==
- List of submissions to the 85th Academy Awards for Best Foreign Language Film
- List of Cambodian submissions for the Academy Award for Best Foreign Language Film
