= An Aeuy Srei An =

- Directed by: Ly Bun Yim
- Starring: Kong Som Eun; Virak Dara; Trente Deux; Nop Naem; Ly Rattanak
- Music by: Sinn Sisamouth
- Distributed by: Ronteah Pech Phiap Yon
- Release date: 1972
- Country: Cambodia
- Language: Khmer

An Aeuy Srei An (Note: Khmer: អនអើយស្រីអន; Ân Aoey Srei Ân, [ɑːn aəj srəj ɑːn], transl. Hey An, Lady An) is a 1972 Cambodian film directed by Ly Bun Yim and produced by Ronteah Pech company. The film is a melodramatic love-triangle between the characters Chea and Su over a woman named An. The film stars Kong Som Eun as Chea, Virak Dara as An, and Nop Naem as Su.

The film is also known as Khmers After Angkor. It is considered a popular production of the "Golden Age" of Cambodian cinema.

== Plot ==
A poor farmer, named Chia, returns home to his family after going to school for several years. He befriends Su who later inherits his father's wealth and high-ranking status.

Upon finishing school and returning home, Chia quickly falls in love with his neighbour, An. His happiness is shattered when his ill father passes away and the landowner demands their cow in lieu of overdue rent. Chia pleads with the landowner to give him a few days while he goes to ask Su for some financial help. Upon Chia’s arrival at Su's residence, Chia quickly discovers that his recently inherited status has caused Su to ignore him and pretend that he doesn't know Chia because of his peasant background. Chia is turned down and returns home with a predicament.

Chia and his younger brother soon begin selling noodles in order to make enough cash for the family. His luck is cut short when he realizes his competition against another noodle seller, making for many light and comedic incidents.

Once their debt is cleared, Chia asks his mother for An’s hand in marriage. This is soon arranged leading to Chiə and An becoming engaged. Both families began raising money for the wedding with Chia continuing to sell noodles and An selling silk cloths with her mother. One day, An and her mother were stopped by Su who instantly falls in love with An and decides to buy every piece of silk cloth they have. Su also sends a henchman with An and her mother to find out where they live just in case he may need to purchase more of their silk. The henchman reports back to Su that Chia is engaged to An. Due to this, Su arranges a plan to get rid of Chia in order to have An for himself.

Su promptly visits Chia and falsely apologizes for what happened earlier. He tells Chia that he will help fund their wedding. Chia’s mother requests that they would need a honeycomb for the wedding, so both Chia and Su set out to find one. They eventually locate one high up in the tree and fasten a rope so they can climb up. Chia goes first and when he reaches the top of the tree, Su betrays him by having his men cut the rope preventing Chia from getting down. Su, under the impression that Chia will die, returns to An saying that Chia has fallen to his death and wishes Su would marry An.

Chia remembers the lessons he learned from his mentor and tricks a bear into bringing him down the tree. He secretly enters Su and An’s wedding ceremony under the disguise of a singer. An, still devastated from Chia’s apparent death, decides to lock herself in a room and commit suicide. Her suicide is thwarted when Chia begins to sing and she recognizes his voice. She unlocks the door and embraces Chia. Su disrupts their reunion by having Chia sent out to the forest to be executed and forces An to marry him.

Chia's younger brother quickly gathers a force of villagers who promptly save Chia from execution. Chia along with the villagers storm the wedding ceremony and Sou is killed in the ensuing chaos. Su's father, realizing what has happened, restores order and justice. Chiə and An are finally reunited at last.

== Soundtrack ==
Title	Singer(s)	Notes
"ជ័យលក់នំបញ្ចុក" Chei Luak Nom Banhchok	Sinn Sisamouth	Monorom Disque, 7013 A
"អនអើយស្រីអន" An Aoey Sroei An	Sinn Sisamouth	Monorom Disque, 7013 B
"ពន្លកស្នេហ៍ជ័យអន" Ponlok Snae Chei An	Sinn Sisamouth, Ros Serey Sothea	Monorom Disque, 7014 A
"កន្សែងសូត្រ" Kansaeng Sot	Sinn Sisamouth	Monorom Disque, 7014 B
