= List of Cambodian films of the 2010s =

The following is a list of Khmer films released in 2010.

== List ==
Title	Director	Cast	Genre	Notes
2010
Angkor Dreams			Documentary	
Awake in Cambodia	Dustin James		Documentary	
Dancing Across Borders	Anne Bass		Drama	
High School's Love Story	Kao Seiha	Chea Vannarith and Keat Sovanna Leang	Drama	
Lost Loves	Chhay Bora	Kauv Southeary	Period drama	
Palace of Dreams	Tom Som		Drama	BBC and Khmer Mekong film
The Road to Freedom	Brendan Moriarty	Joshua Frederic Smith and Scott Maguire	Action	Inspired by real-life photojournalist Sean Flynn, who disappeared with fellow photojournalist Dana Stone in Cambodia in 1970. Brendan Moriaty debut film as director. Released January 2010.
Rice Field of Dreams	Daron Ker		Documentary	The film follows the first national Cambodian Baseball team as they compete in the Sea Games a South East Asian equivalent of the Olympics.
Angry at the Sky			Drama	A film about the secret bombing in Cambodia by U.S. president Richard Nixon in the late 1960s
Kiles			Drama	
2013
A River Changes Course	Kalyanee Mam		Documentary	
The Missing Picture	Rithy Panh		Documentary	Co-production with France
2014
Cambodian Son	Masahiro Sugano	Kosal Khiev	Documentary	
The Storm Makers	Guillaume Suon		Documentary	Co-production with France
The Last Reel	Kulikar Sotho	Rous Mony, Ma Rynet, Dy Saveth, Hun Sophy, Sok Sothun	Drama	
2015
Before the Fall	Ian White	Ian Virgo, Antonis Greco	Action thriller	
2016
Exile	Rithy Panh		Documentary	Co-production with France
Vikaljarek	Huy Yaleng	Huy Yaleng, Vandy Piseth, Vathtey Chhom	Horror	
2017
Jailbreak	Jimmy Henderson	Jean-Paul Ly, Dara Our, Tharoth Sam, Céline Tran, Savin Phillip	Action	
First They Killed My Father	Angelina Jolie	Sreymoch Sareum, Kompheak Phoeung, Socheta Sveng, Mun Kimhak, Run Malina	Biographical drama	Co-production with the United States
Mind Cage	Amit Dubey	Keo Ratha, Ruos Mony, Sveng Socheata, Savin Phillip, Sarita Reth	Horror	Original title: សតិជាប់ទ្រុង
2018
In the Life of Music	Caylee So, Sok Visal	Ratanak Ben, Daniel Chea, Socheat Chea, Sreynan Chea, Arn Chorn-Pond	Drama	
Graves Without a Name	Rithy Panh		Documentary	Co-production with France
The Prey	Jimmy Henderson	Gu Shangwei, Vithaya Pansringarm, Byron Bishop, Nophand Boonyai, Rous Mony	Action	
2019
The Clock: Spirits Awakening	Leak Lyda	Sorn Piseth, Nov Dana, Yem Sreypich, Khul Samanta, Lar Boomsma	Horror drama	
