= List of Cambodian Asia Pacific Screen Award winners and nominees =

This is a list of Cambodian Asia Pacific Screen Awards winners and nominees. This list details the performances of Cambodian actors, actresses, and films that have either been submitted or nominated for, or have won, an Asia Pacific Screen Award.

== Awards and nominations ==
Year (Ceremony)	Award	Recipient	Result	Note	Ref.
2009 (3rd)	Best Documentary Feature Film	Survive, In the Heart of the Khmer Rouge Madness	Nominated	Cambodian-French co-production	
2010 (4th)	Best Documentary Feature Film	Enemies of the People	Nominated	Cambodian-British co-production	
2016 (10th)	Best Documentary Feature Film	Exile	Nominated	Cambodian-French co-production	

- Nominations – 3

== See also ==
- List of Cambodian submissions for the Academy Award for Best International Feature Film
