= Lucky Child =

2005 memoir by Loung Ung

Lucky Child: A Daughter of Cambodia Reunites with the Sister She Left Behind
- First edition
- Author: Loung Ung
- Language: English
- Subject: Cambodian genocide
- Genre: Memoir
- Publisher: HarperCollins
- Publication date: 2005
- Media type: Print (paperback)
- Pages: 288 p.
- ISBN: 978-0-06-073395-7
- Preceded by: First They Killed My Father
- Followed by: Lulu in the Sky

Lucky Child: A Daughter of Cambodia Reunites with the Sister She Left Behind (2005) is a memoir written by a Cambodian-born American woman, Loung Ung. Her previous memoir was First They Killed My Father. The memoir chronicles her adjustment to life in the U.S. after escaping the Cambodian genocide. It also tells of the experiences of her surviving family members in Cambodia during the ensuing warfare between Vietnamese troops and the Khmer Rouge. Lucky Child covers the period of 1980 until 2003.

== Story ==
=== Events ===
Lucky Child tells the story of Loung Ung and her sister Chou Ung. Each chapter alternates between their stories. Loung lives in Vermont as a refugee with her older brother Meng and her sister-in-law Eang. Meng only had enough money to bring one of his siblings with him, so he had to leave the rest of his family. He chose Loung to come with him because she was the youngest, ten years old upon leaving Cambodia; hence, she is the "lucky child."

- Loung - In America, Loung dealt with issues regarding assimilation and fitting in. Her family originally had lived off of food stamps in order to survive. At school, Loung was ridiculed for her poor English and her ethnic Cambodian facial features. Her belly still bloated from malnutrition, she felt she wasn't pretty. She also continued to be plagued by memories of Cambodia and the Khmer Rouge. Even as she began to put the past behind her, she could not entirely because her brother refused to do so. Nonetheless, Loung's quality of life was a lot higher than her prospects had she remained in Cambodia; she even earned a full scholarship to college. Loung was often haunted by her torturous past but finally comes to terms with it when she visits Cambodia at the end of the story and finally reunites with her long-lost family.

Loung's story is written in the first person present tense.

- Chou - Chou's life in Cambodia was very different. The village where she and the rest of Loung's family lived was still plagued by random Khmer Rouge attacks. The family, despite its previous upper-class status, was reduced to peasant status. Khouy was forced to enlist in the military to earn money. At the age of eighteen Chou's aunt and uncle arrange a marriage to her. She and her new husband Pheng lived on her aunt and uncle's property. Chou gives birth to several children.

Chou's story was recorded by Loung and translated to English. It is written in the third person.

=== Characters ===
- Loung Ung - The author and narrator of the American story arc.
- Chou Ung - Loung's sister. Older by three years, Chou remained in Cambodia with the rest of her family. Chou was closest to Loung and missed her younger sister a lot. At age eighteen she marries Pheng. She is the central character in the Cambodian story arc.
- Meng and Eang Ung - Loung's caretakers, Meng is her eldest brother and Eang is her sister-in-law. They flee Cambodia with Loung for Thailand, there they receive sponsorship by an American church to live in Vermont.
- Maria and Tori Ung - The children of Meng and Eang and Loung's nieces; they are the first Ungs to become American citizens since they were born in America.

== Author ==
Loung Ung is a Cambodian-American human-rights activist. Born in Phnom Penh, Ung came from an affluent Cambodian family. Since her father was a senior military official, the Ung family was specifically targeted in a genocide known as the Killing Fields. An orphan, Ung spent time in a labor camp and a child-soldier training camp.

Ung is now the national spokeswoman for an international anti-landmine organization, Vietnam Veterans of America’s Foundation for a Landmine Free World.
