= Loung Ung =

Cambodian-American activist (born 1970)

- អ៊ឹង លួង
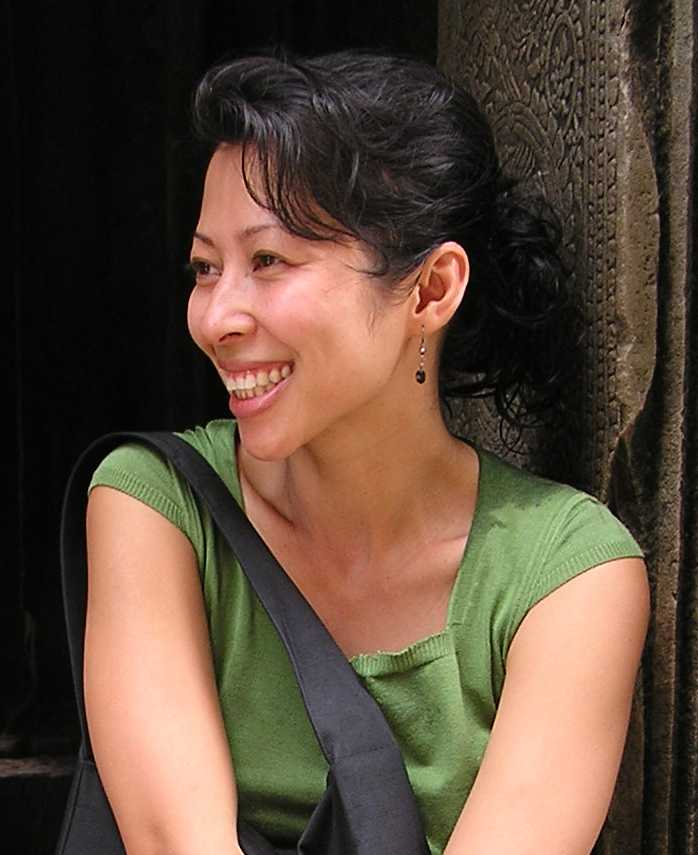
- Ung in 2008
- Born: 19 November 1970 (age 55); Phnom Penh, Khmer Republic
- Citizenship: United States
- Education: Saint Michael's College (BA)
- Occupations: Author; lecturer; activist
- Spouse: Mark Priemer (m. 2002)
- Relatives: Keav † · Geak † · Chou (sisters); Khouy · Kim · Meng (brothers)
- Writing career
- Language: English
- Period: 21st century (2000–present)
- Genre: Human Rights
- Notable works: First They Killed My Father: A Daughter of Cambodia Remembers; Lucky Child: A Daughter of Cambodia Reunites with the Sister She Left Behind
- Notable awards: Herbert Scoville Jr. Peace Fellowship
- Website: www.loungung.com

Loung Ung (Khmer: អ៊ឹង លួង; born 19 November 1970) is a Cambodian-American human rights activist, lecturer, former child soldier and national spokesperson for the Campaign for a Landmine-Free World from 1997 to 2003. She has served in the same capacity for the International Campaign to Ban Landmines, which is affiliated with the Vietnam Veterans of America Foundation.

Born in Phnom Penh, Cambodia, Ung was the sixth of seven children and the third of four girls to Seng Im Ung and Ay Choung Ung. At the age of 10, she escaped from Cambodia as a survivor of what became known as the Killing Fields during the reign of Pol Pot's Khmer Rouge regime. After being resettled as a refugee in the United States, she eventually wrote two books which related to her life experiences from 1975 through 2003. She is portrayed by Sareum Srey Moch as the protagonist in Angelina Jolie's 2017 film First They Killed My Father, based on Ung's memoir of the same name.

== Biography ==
=== Memoirs ===
Ung's first memoir, First They Killed My Father: A Daughter of Cambodia Remembers, details her experiences in Cambodia from 1975 until 1980: "From 1975 to 1979—through execution, starvation, disease, and forced labour—the Khmer Rouge systematically killed an estimated two million Cambodians, almost a fourth of the country's population. This is a story of survival: my own and my family's. Though these events constitute my own experience, my story mirrors that of millions of Cambodians. If you had been living in Cambodia during this period, this would be your story too".

External videos
- Booknotes interview with Ung on First They Killed My Father, March 19, 2000, C-SPAN
- Presentation by Loung Ung on First They Killed My Father, June 13, 2000, C-SPAN

Published in the United States in 2000 by HarperCollins, it became a national bestseller, and in 2001 it won the Asian/Pacific American Award for Literature for "Excellence in Adult Non-fiction Literature" from the Asian/Pacific American Librarians Association. First They Killed My Father has subsequently been published in twelve countries, in nine languages, and has a film adaptation.

Her second memoir, Lucky Child: A Daughter of Cambodia Reunites with the Sister She Left Behind, chronicles her adjustment to life in the U.S. with and without her family, and the experiences of her surviving family members in Cambodia during the ensuing warfare between Vietnamese troops and the Khmer Rouge. It covers the period of 1980 until 2003, and HarperCollins published it in 2005.

In both of her memoirs, Ung wrote in the first person and, for the most part, in the present tense, describing the events and circumstances as if they were unfolding before the reader's eyes: "I wanted [the readers] to be there".

=== Early years: 1970–75 ===
Ung's father was born in the small village of Tro Nuon in Kampong Cham province in 1931. Her mother was from Chaozhou, China and moved with her family to Cambodia when she was little. The two married against her family's wishes, and eventually came to live with their children in a third-floor apartment in the center of the bustling capital city of Phnom Penh. Due to his record of service in the previous government of Prince Norodom Sihanouk, Ung's father was conscripted into the government of Lon Nol and became a high-ranking military police officer. Ung's mother supported her family as a housekeeper. The family was relatively average and owned two cars and a truck, and lived in a house with running water, a flushable toilet, and an iron bathtub. They had telephones, as well as the daily services of a maid, and often enjoyed films at the nearby theater and swimming in the pool at a local club. By her own account, Loung lived a happy and carefree life in a close-knit loving family, until April 17, 1975, when the Khmer Rouge gained control of Cambodia and evacuated Phnom Penh.

=== Evacuation: 1975 ===
Loung was playing near her home when trucks filled with Khmer Rouge troops rolled into her neighbourhood. The population of Phnom Penh, estimated at nearly two million people, was forced to evacuate. The Ungs abruptly left their home with what few belongings they could stow in their truck. When the truck ran out of fuel, they gathered the bare essentials that they could carry and began what became a seven-day trek toward Bat Deng in a throng of evacuees, harried by the bullhorns of the soldiers. Along the way they stopped at night to sleep in the fields and to search for food. Seng Im Ung, posing as the father of a peasant family, was fortunate to get by a military checkpoint in Kom Baul without being detained; many evacuees who were perceived to be a threat to the new government, because of their previous education or political position, were summarily executed there. On the seventh day, as the Ungs neared Bat Deng, Loung's uncle found them and arranged to bring them by wagon to his village of Krang Truop.

Ung and her family stayed only a few months in Krang Truop because Loung's father was afraid that newly arrived evacuees from Phnom Penh would reveal his identity. He made arrangements for the family to be transported to Battambang, the city of Loung's grandmother, but his plan was thwarted by the Khmer Rouge soldiers. Instead, the Ung family was taken, along with about 300 other evacuees, to the village of Anglungthmor, where they stayed for five months. During that time, more than half of the new arrivals at Anglungthmor died of starvation, food poisoning, or disease. Malnourishment was severe. Again fearing that discovery of his ties to the Lon Nol government was imminent, Loung's father pleaded to have his family relocated. The Khmer Rouge ordered them taken to Ro Leap, where about sixty other families arrived on the same day.

=== Separation, starvation, and death: 1976–78 ===
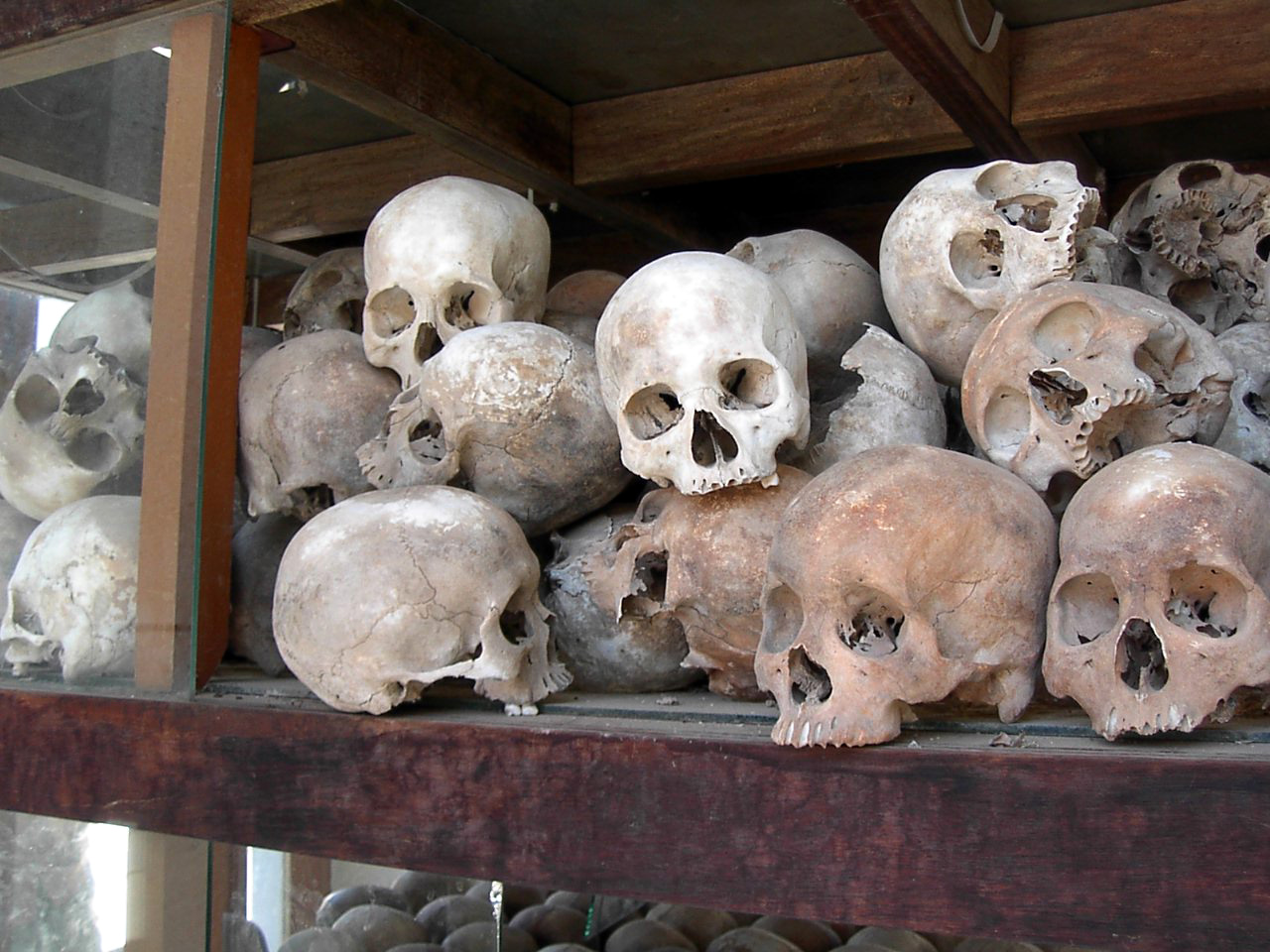
Skulls of Khmer Rouge victims

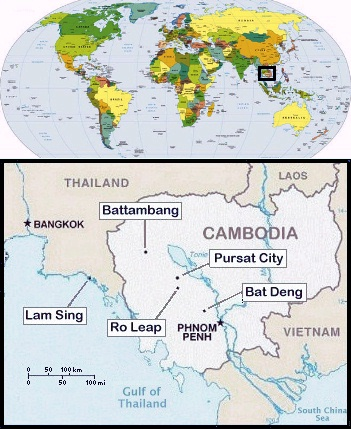
Significant places in Loung's life in Cambodia

Ro Leap was Ung's home for the next eighteen months. Cut off from all outside communication and constantly in fear of soldiers who patrolled the village, the Ungs were forced by the Khmer Rouge to work long hours with very little food. Near-starvation and physical exhaustion became a way of life. A few months after their arrival, Loung's oldest brothers, eighteen-year-old Meng and sixteen-year-old Khouy, and her oldest sister, fourteen-year-old Keav, were sent away to work in different camps. Six months later, in August 1976, Keav died of food poisoning at the teenagers’ work camp at Kong Cha Lat. In December, two soldiers came to the Ungs' hut and demanded the help of Loung's father to free a stuck wagon; he was never seen or heard from again.

Loung and her brother, eleven-year-old Kim, and her two sisters, nine-year-old Chou and four-year-old Geak, remained in Ro Leap with their mother until May 1977. During this time, they avoided starvation with the help of Meng and Khouy, who brought them what little food they could get from their work camp, and Kim, who risked his life late at night by stealing corn from the crops guarded by the soldiers. In May, agitated by screams in the night and the sudden disappearance of a neighboring family, Ay Ung sent Kim, Chou, and Loung away from Ro Leap with instructions to pretend they were orphans and never to come back. Kim separated from his sisters, while Loung and Chou found a nearby children's work camp where their guise as orphans was accepted. In time, Loung and Chou gained strength with improved food rationing, and in August 1977, Loung, now seven years old, was assigned to a training camp for child soldiers, and was forced to leave her sister Chou behind.

For the following seventeen months, Loung Ung learned how to fight the Vietnamese soldiers. In November 1978, she left her camp under the cover of night without permission, and returned to Ro Leap to see her mother and sister. Upon arriving, she found the hut empty, although her mother's belongings were still there. The woman in the neighboring hut told her that Ay and Geak had been taken away by the soldiers. They were also never seen again.

In January 1979, the People's Army of Vietnam gained control of Phnom Penh and continued their invasion westward. Mortar explosions in her camp forced Ung and her fellow villagers to flee for their lives. In the ensuing chaos, her brother Kim and sister Chou found her on the road, and they set out for Pursat, stopping only to rest and find food. Several days later, they entered Pursat, a refugee camp under the control of comparatively friendly Vietnamese troops, and eventually were given shelter by families willing to take them in. The camp was sporadically attacked by Khmer Rouge soldiers, and Loung, nearly nine years old, saw more of the horrors of warfare.

=== Escape from Cambodia: 1979–80 ===
In March 1979, Meng and Khouy, both of whom had also escaped their camps when the People's Army of Vietnam, arrived at Pursat. In April, the reunited Ungs set out on an eighteen-day trek to Bat Deng, where they stayed with their uncle Leang and his family. During this time Meng married Eang, a twenty-year-old Chinese girl who was separated from her family, in a ceremony arranged by Loung's uncle and aunt. In time, they learned that Eang's mother and father were safe in Vietnam, and Meng and Eang went to see them. With their aid, Meng and Eang devised a plan to get to Thailand via Vietnam, and then, they hoped, to the United States. Meng returned alone to Bat Deng. With limited resources, he could afford to take only one family member with him back to Vietnam; he chose Loung.

In October, Loung and Meng were smuggled into Vietnam via a fishing boat and stayed with Eang and her family. In December, Loung, Meng, and Eang moved to a houseboat in Long Deang in preparation for their prearranged escape to Thailand. In February 1980, after a perilous three-day voyage across the Gulf of Thailand in the hands of paid professionals, they arrived at the Lam Sing refugee camp on the coast of Thailand. Among the thousands of refugees who were waiting for sponsorship to go to another country, the Ungs waited four months in Lam Sing before they found out that the U.S. Conference of Catholic Bishops and the Holy Family Church in Essex Junction, Vermont, would be their sponsors. In the middle of June 1980, Loung, Meng, and Eang boarded a plane at Bangkok International Airport and headed for their new home.

=== Life in America: 1980–2011 ===
==== Education in the United States ====
Their sponsors brought the Ungs by car from Burlington International Airport to Essex Junction, Vermont, and ushered them into a small one-bedroom apartment above a dentist's office at 48 Main Street. The dining room doubled as Loung's bedroom. Church members continued to help the Ungs adjust and provided tutoring in the English language. In a few months, Meng, whose grasp of English was good, obtained employment as an interpreter for newly arrived refugees in Vermont, and Eang found work at a local manufacturing company. In September, Loung, age ten, began her formal education in the United States in the third grade. The early years of her education were difficult for Loung because of the language barrier, and she continued to be tutored during those years. In the late stage of Eang's pregnancy, Meng abandoned his studies at a nearby college and began working at two jobs; on December 21, Meng and Eang's daughter Maria was born.

In 1983, Loung entered the ADL Intermediate School, and continued with English language learning and teaching (ESL) sessions. Meng and Eang both found employment with IBM on the evening shift, and Loung, now thirteen years old, cared for Maria after school until they returned home late at night. Meng sent money and packages, via the Asian community in Montreal, Quebec, Canada, to his family in Cambodia as often as he could throughout the 1980s; some packages either did not arrive or arrived with some of the contents missing. In 1985, Eang gave birth to her second daughter, Victoria, and Loung entered Essex Junction High School as a freshman. A few months later, Meng and Eang were sworn in as naturalized citizens of the United States. In early 1986, the Ungs moved, with the help of their sponsors, into their own modest two-story home in a nearby neighbourhood, and Loung, now nearly sixteen years old, delighted in having her own personal room.

Later that year Loung's teacher praised her for a sophomore English class paper she had written about growing up in Cambodia, and he encouraged her to write the whole story. During her six years in the U.S., Loung had often dealt with bouts of sadness and loneliness. After attempting suicide, she began to write the story of her life in Cambodia, her family, and the Khmer Rouge. Over many months, her journal came to number hundreds of pages, and Loung continued to maintain a journal for many years. In retrospect, Loung has stated that untangling her feelings and putting them into words throughout those years was very therapeutic.

In 1989, Loung graduated from high school, and in the fall, she entered Saint Michael's College with the financial assistance of a full four-year scholarship provided by the Turrell Scholarship Fund. During her college years, she made a conscious decision to become an activist and met her future husband. In early 1992, Loung studied at Cannes International College as part of Saint Michael's curriculum. During that time, she was reunited with her youngest brother Kim, who had fled Cambodia to Thailand and was brought to France via Germany with the help of his Aunt Heng in 1985. In 1993, Loung graduated from Saint Michael's College with a B.A. in political science and found work as a community educator at a shelter for abused women in Lewiston, Maine.

==== Professional life ====
In 1995, Ung traveled back to Cambodia for the first time since she had fled fifteen years earlier. During this visit, she and Meng and his family reconnected with the family they had left behind and learned of the murders of many of their relatives during the Khmer Rouge reign. Sometime after returning to the U.S., Ung left Maine and moved to Washington, D.C., and in late 1996, joined the Vietnam Veterans of America Foundation (VVAF), an international humanitarian organization that provides physical rehabilitation clinics, prostheses, and mobility devices free of charge in many countries and in several provinces in Cambodia. In 1997, Ung was awarded a Herbert Scoville Jr. Peace Fellowship, where she worked at the Peace Action Education Fund researching weapons trafficking and landmine legislation. In 2005, Loung made her twenty-fifth trip to Cambodia as the VVAF's spokesperson for the International Campaign to Ban Landmines. The VVAF has, since 1991, fitted more than 15,000 victims with the means to walk and enjoy a better quality of life. Bobby Muller, chairman of the foundation, has said that "what comes out [when Ung lectures] is just staggering. It rocks people. She's the best thing this organization has ever had to advance our agenda". The campaign won the Nobel Peace Prize in 1997.

Loung, Meng and Kim returned to Bat Deng in 1998 for a large family reunion with Khouy, Chou and all their relatives, including their 88-year-old grandmother. The Ungs arranged a Buddhist ceremony to honour their parents, Sem and Ay, and their sisters, Keav and Geak, who had all died at the hands of the Khmer Rouge regime; the service was attended by many hundreds of relatives and friends. Two years later, her first memoir was published. In 2002, Loung married her college sweetheart, Mark Priemer, and bought two and a half acres of land in Cambodia just a short distance from her sister Chou's home. During commencement ceremonies at Saint Michael's College in May 2002, Loung was inducted into the inaugural class of the college's Alumnae Academic Hall of Fame: "Saint Michael's is proud beyond measure to honour its 1993 graduate, Loung Ung". In 2003, she was chosen by Saint Michael's to address the graduating class. Her second memoir was published in 2005.

==== Move to Cleveland ====
The following is an excerpt from the article "Cambodian refugee had new difficulties after move to U.S.", published by the Nashua Telegraph on Sunday, April 17, 2005.

Ung recently moved to suburban Cleveland where her husband grew up. He knows, though, that someday he'll probably be living in Cambodia where Ung owns 2½ acres and plans to build a home. For now, she keeps plenty of reminders of the country in her fourth-floor home office — a statue of Buddha, a photograph of a palm tree and rice field that she feels captures the country's beauty. Her office overlooks a wood deck that has been painted rusty red to remind her of the soil of her native home. She's working on her first novel, set in 1148 in Cambodia. She's shy about revealing the plot. Again, she's sure it will only sell 10 copies.

== Reception ==
Ung's first book has been criticized by members of the Cambodian community in the U.S., a number of whom believe that it is more a work of fiction than an actual autobiography. She has also been accused of misrepresenting the Khmer people and playing on ethnic stereotypes for the purpose of self-aggrandizement and over-dramatization to increase sales and publicity.

Among the complaints that some Cambodians have about Ung's works is that she was only five years old when the Khmer Rouge began its reign, and that she could not possibly have so vivid and detailed a memory of the events as they have been documented in her book. Her detractors also claim that, as a child of a Chinese mother and a Khmer father highly placed in the Phnom Penh government, she paints a very unfavourable picture of Khmer villagers.

There is a picture in First They Killed My Father that was supposedly taken "on a family trip to Angkor Wat" in 1973 or 1974. A civil war had been in progress in Cambodia since 1970 and the Khmer Rouge was in control of Siem Reap (the location of Angkor Wat) from 1973 onward. Critics state that it is not likely that Ung's family would be vacationing at that time in that region of Cambodia, that the picture was taken at Wat Phnom, which is in Phnom Penh, the capital of Cambodia, and that Ung's memory is therefore unreliable.

In December 2000, Ung responded to the earliest of these criticisms.

== Bibliography ==
- First They Killed My Father: A Daughter of Cambodia Remembers (HarperCollins Publishers, Inc., 2000) ISBN 0-06-019332-8
- Lucky Child: A Daughter of Cambodia Reunites with the Sister She Left Behind (HarperCollins Publishers, Inc., 2005) ISBN 0-06-073394-2
