= List of Cambodian submissions for the Academy Award for Best International Feature Film =

Best International Feature Film submissions from Cambodia

Highlights
- Debut: 1994
- Submissions: 14
- Nominations: 1
- Oscar winners: none

Cambodia submitted a film for the Academy Award for Best International Feature Film (Note: The category was previously named the Academy Award for Best Foreign Language Film, but this was changed to the Academy Award for Best International Feature Film in April 2019, after the Academy deemed the word "Foreign" to be outdated.) for the first time in 1994. The award is handed out annually by the United States Academy of Motion Picture Arts and Sciences to a feature-length motion picture produced outside the United States that contains primarily non-English dialogue.

As of 2026, Cambodia was nominated once for The Missing Picture (2013).

== Submissions ==
The Academy of Motion Picture Arts and Sciences has invited the film industries of various countries to submit their best film for the Academy Award for Best International Feature Film since 1956. The International Feature Film Committee oversees the process and reviews all the submitted films. Following this, they vote via secret ballot to determine the five nominees for the award.

Rithy Panh is the most submitted filmmaker with four films selected. The Missing Picture (2013), directed by Panh, was the country first and only nomination.

Hollywood actress and filmmaker Angelina Jolie (who has Cambodian citizenship) has one film submitted for the category, First They Killed My Father (2017).

Return to Seoul (2022) advanced to the December shortlists, but it was not nominated.

Most of the films are primary in Khmer or French. Below is a list of the films that have been submitted by Cambodia for review by the academy for the award by year and the respective Academy Awards ceremony.

Year (Ceremony)	Film title used in nomination	Original title	Language(s)	Director	Result
1994 (67th)	Rice People	អ្នកស្រែ	Khmer	Rithy Panh	Not nominated
2012 (85th)	Lost Loves	ឃ្លាតទៅសែនឆ្ងាយ	Khmer	Chhay Bora	Not nominated
2013 (86th)	The Missing Picture	រូបភាពដែលបាត់បង់	French	Rithy Panh	Nominated
2015 (88th)	The Last Reel	ដុំហ្វីលចុងក្រោយ	Khmer	Kulikar Sotho	Not nominated
2016 (89th)	Before the Fall	មុនពេលបែកបាក់	Khmer, English, French	Ian White	Not nominated
2017 (90th)	First They Killed My Father	មុនដំបូងខ្មែរក្រហមសម្លាប់ប៉ារបស់ខ្ញុំ	Khmer, English	Angelina Jolie	Not nominated
2018 (91st)	Graves Without a Name	ផ្នូរគ្មានឈ្មោះ	French, Khmer	Rithy Panh	Not nominated
2019 (92nd)	In the Life of Music	តន្រ្តីជីវិត	Khmer, English	Caylee So, Sok Visal	Not nominated
2020 (93rd)	Fathers	ដើម្បីកូន	Khmer	Huy Yaleng	Not nominated
2021 (94th)	White Building	ប៊ូឌីញ ស	Khmer	Kavich Neang	Not nominated
2022 (95th)	Return to Seoul	Retour à Séoul	French, Korean, English	Davy Chou	Made shortlist
2024 (97th)	Meeting with Pol Pot	Rendez-vous avec Pol Pot	French, Khmer	Rithy Panh	Not nominated
2025 (98th)	Tenement	អ្នកស្នងអគារ	Khmer, Japanese	Inrasothythep Neth and Sokyou Chea	Not on the final list
2026 (99th)	Becoming Human	ជាតិជាមនុស្សា	Khmer	Polen Ly	Pending

== See also ==
- List of Academy Award winners and nominees for Best International Feature Film
- List of Academy Award-winning foreign language films
