= First They Killed My Father (film) =

2017 Cambodian-American film by Angelina Jolie

- Film poster
- Directed by: Angelina Jolie
- Screenplay by: Loung Ung; Angelina Jolie
- Based on: First They Killed My Father by Loung Ung
- Produced by: Angelina Jolie; Rithy Panh; Ted Sarandos; Michael Vieira
- Starring: Sreymoch Sareum; Kompheak Phoeung; Socheata Sveng; Dara Heng; Kimhak Mun; Tharoth Sam; Reth Tiger
- Cinematography: Anthony Dod Mantle
- Edited by: Xavier Box; Patricia Rommel
- Music by: Marco Beltrami
- Production company: Bophana Jolie Pas
- Distributed by: Netflix
- Release dates: February 18, 2017 (Siem Reap); September 15, 2017 (United States)
- Running time: 136 minutes
- Countries: Cambodia; United States
- Languages: Khmer; English; French; Vietnamese
- Budget: $22 million

First They Killed My Father (Khmer: មុនដំបូងខ្មែរក្រហមសម្លាប់ប៉ារបស់ខ្ញុំ, romanized: Mŭn Dâmbong Khmêr Krâhâm Sâmloăb Pa Rôbás Khnhŭm, lit. 'First The Khmer Rouge Killed My Father') is a 2017 Khmer-language biographical thriller film directed by Angelina Jolie and written by Jolie and Loung Ung. The film is based on Ung's eponymous memoir. Set in 1975, the film depicts 5-year-old Loung, who is forced to train as a child soldier while her siblings are sent to labor camps in Democratic Kampuchea.

The film was screened at the Telluride Film Festival and 2017 Toronto International Film Festival, and was released worldwide on Netflix on September 15, 2017, to positive critical reception.

== Plot ==
In 1975, in the Khmer Republic, Loung Ung is the five-year-old daughter of an officer of the Khmer National Armed Forces, known as "Pa" to his seven children. During the Vietnam War, the fighting spills over into neighboring Cambodia when the United States military begins bombing North Vietnamese forces attempting to shelter in the neutral territory, commencing the Cambodian Civil War. The U.S. then pulls out of Cambodia and evacuates its embassy.

The Khmer Rouge draws closer, captures Phnom Penh, and then forces all families to leave the city as refugees, under the pretext that it will be bombed by Americans. Pa Ung denies working for the government when questioned by the Khmer Rouge soldiers, knowing that he will be killed if discovered. The family is found by "Uncle" (Loung's maternal uncle), Pa's brother-in-law, and Loung's family stays with Uncle's family for some time. However, at the insistence of Aunt, who fears the consequences if Pa's identity is discovered, Loung's family has to leave.

After days of travel, they are captured by Khmer Rouge soldiers and taken with other refugees to a labor camp, where they have to build their own shelter and are forced to work under harsh conditions. Their possessions are confiscated, food is scarce as all crops are sent to fighting units, and any attempt to get more food is punished with beatings. Loung is a witness to her siblings' being merciless beaten as they try to get more food for themselves and their families.

Aside from hard work, the camp preaches the regime propaganda, and any foreign items (including life-saving medicine) are forbidden and carry the death penalty. Loung's two oldest brothers and oldest sister Keav are reassigned to other camps, and soon afterward Keav dies from dysentery.

One day Loung sees Pa taken away by the Khmer Rouge officials to repair a bridge. Knowing what awaits him, he says goodbye to his wife and children. Later on, Loung has a nightmare in which she sees him executed and buried in a mass grave. Soon afterward, Ma tells Loung, her older brother Kim, and her older sister Chou to flee in different directions and seek new working camps under false identities as orphans. Loung and her sister separate from their brother and reach another camp.

There, Loung is recruited to be a child soldier for the Khmer Rouge; The Vietnamese and the Khmer Rouge have been locked in border skirmishes with each other. Loung learns hand-to-hand combat, shooting, and preparation of traps, and works on laying mine fields against the Vietnamese. Children are constantly taught propaganda and bitter hatred of the Vietnamese, but they get more food and are treated better than workers in the labor camps. One day, Loung gets a pass to visit her sister in the labor camp, but instead, she travels to the camp where her mother and youngest sister are left behind. She finds their hut empty and an old woman tells her that her family was taken away by the Khmer Rouge soldiers. That night Loung dreams about her mother lying dead in a mass grave with her youngest sister Geak being executed.

Loung's camp is destroyed by Vietnamese shelling, forcing her to flee along with other civilians. On the road, she reunites with Chou and Kim who stay for a night in a temporary refugee camp managed by Vietnamese troops, where the siblings join a group of children. As the camp is attacked by Khmer Rouge forces the next morning, they slip behind the defending Vietnamese to escape the fighting into the jungle. There Loung is separated from her siblings and witnesses other refugees killed and maimed by the mines that she herself helped set.

The three siblings are reunited in another refugee camp run by the Red Cross. There Loung sees people beating a captured Khmer Rouge soldier. She sees him as her father and flashes back to the violence in her life. As the war ends, Loung along with her siblings Kim and Chou are reunited with their older brothers who also survived the camps. The movie ends with the adult Loung and her siblings praying with the monks for their lost family members in the ruins of a Buddhist temple.

== Cast ==
- Sreymoch Sareum as Young Loung Ung
- Kompheak Phoeung as Pa Ung
- Socheta Sveng as Ma
- Mun Kimhak as Kim
- Run Malina as Chou
- Sreyneang Oun as Keav
- Tep Rindaro as Lon Non
- Horm Chhora
- Dy Sonita
- Loung Ung as herself
- Tharoth Sam as child soldier leader
- Reth Tiger as Khmer Rouge soldier
- Sreyneath Reth as Khmer Rouge teacher

The film's cast is almost entirely Cambodian actors and its dialogue is almost entirely in the Khmer language.

== Production ==
On July 23, 2015, it was announced that Angelina Jolie would direct a film adaptation of the memoir First They Killed My Father by Loung Ung for Netflix, for which Jolie and Ung co-wrote the script. Jolie would also produce the film along with Rithy Panh, while Jolie's son Maddox Jolie-Pitt would be an executive producer.

=== Filming ===
Principal photography on the film began in early November 2015 in Siem Reap and wrapped in February 2016 in Battambang, Cambodia. The filming also took place in Phnom Penh.

== Reception ==
=== Critical response ===
On review aggregator website Rotten Tomatoes the film has an approval rating of 88% based on 65 reviews, with an average rating of 7.8/10. The site's critical consensus reads, "First They Killed My Father tackles its subject matter with grace, skill, and empathy, offering a ground-level look at historic atrocities that resonates beyond its story's borders." Metacritic, another review aggregator, assigned the film a weighted average score of 72 out of 100, based on 22 critics, indicating "generally favorable" reviews.

Matt Zoller Seitz of RogerEbert.com gave the film four out of four stars, stating that it was Jolie's best work as a director yet, made without any compromise to its "journalistic" storytelling. He noted that "[t]he ace in Jolie's deck here is the knowledge that a girl as young as Loung can't comprehend the larger meaning of what's happening to her, and is therefore unlikely to expend precious emotional energy connecting cause-and-effect dots or lamenting what was lost. It's an almost entirely experiential movie." He later named it the second best film of the year, behind Lucky, stating that it is "[o]ne of the greatest films about war ever made, as well as one of the best films about childhood.... I can't imagine a frame of this film being better, only different."

=== Accolades ===
The film was selected as the Cambodian entry for the Best Foreign Language Film for the 90th Academy Awards, but it was not nominated. It was the first time a prominent American director's non-English film was submitted since the Academy set a rule in 1984 that a country's submission has "artistic control" from a "creative talent of that country"; Jolie has dual citizenship with the U.S. and Cambodia.

Award	Date of ceremony	Category	Recipient(s) and nominee(s)	Result	Ref.
British Academy Film Awards	February 18, 2018	Best Film Not in the English Language	Angelina Jolie	Nominated	
Camerimage	11—18 November 2017	Bronze Frog	Anthony Dod Mantle	Won	
Critics' Choice Movie Awards	January 11, 2018	Best Foreign Language Film	Angelina Jolie	Nominated	
Golden Globe Awards	January 7, 2018	Best Foreign Language Film	Angelina Jolie	Nominated	
Hollywood Film Awards	November 5, 2017	Hollywood Foreign Language Film Award	Loung Ung, Angelina Jolie	Won	
National Board of Review	28 November 2017	Freedom of Expression Award	Angelina Jolie	Won	
Online Film Critics Society	28 December 2017	Best Foreign Language Film	Angelina Jolie	Nominated	
Satellite Awards	February 10, 2018	Best Foreign Language Film	Angelina Jolie	Nominated	
Women's Image Network Awards	February 2018	Best Foreign Language Film	Angelina Jolie	Nominated	

== See also ==
- List of submissions to the 90th Academy Awards for Best Foreign Language Film
- List of Cambodian submissions for the Academy Award for Best Foreign Language Film
