= Que la barque se brise, que la jonque s'entrouvre =

2001 television film directed by Rithy Panh

- Directed by: Rithy Panh
- Written by: Rithy Panh
- Starring: Vantha Talisman; Éric Nguyen
- Distributed by: Catherine Dussart Productions
- Release date: 2001 (France)
- Running time: 87 minutes
- Country: Cambodia/France

Que la barque se brise, que la jonque s'entrouvre (Literally, "Let the boat break its back, let the junk break open") is a 2001 French-Cambodian made-for-television romantic-drama film directed by Rithy Panh.

== Synopsis ==
This telefilm describes the meeting between Cambodian restaurateur Bopha ("flower"), a survivor of the genocide of the Khmer Rouge, and a Vietnamese man named Mihn, a "boat people" refugee who drives a taxi at night and works as a deliveryman during the day for his uncle's grocery store.

== Cast ==
- Vantha Talisman as Bopha
- Éric Nguyen as Mihn
- Molica Kheng as Lacksmey
- Chamroeun Na as Yeay Mean
- Amara Tan as Naline
