= Indiavision =

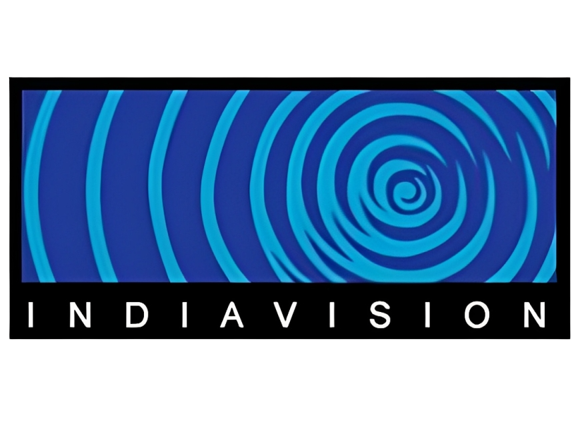
- Logo used since 2003
- Country: India
- Broadcast area: Indian sub-continent, Sri Lanka, Middle East
- Network
- Headquarters: Kochi, Kerala India

Programming
- Language: Malayalam

Ownership
- Owner: Indiavision Satellite Communications

History
- Launched: 14 July 2003; 23 years ago
- Founder: M. K. Muneer
- Closed: 31 March 2015; 11 years ago

Links
- Website: Discontinued

Indiavision was an Indian Malayalam language pay television news channel owned by Indiavision Satellite Communications Ltd, based at Kochi, Kerala, India. "There will be a relaunch of this channel in future" said by M. K. Muneer.

It was the first 24-hour news channel in Kerala. Veena George, Health minister of Kerala in Second Vijayan ministry was a former journalist in this channel.

== History ==
Indiavision was launched on 14 July 2003. The network launched a second channel, YES Indiavision (Youth, Entertainment & Sports) on 14 February 2007.

=== Notable events and controversies ===
In 2004, it came into spotlight through live revelations of Rejina about Ice cream parlour sex scandal accusing P. K. Kunhalikutty and ensuing attacks on journalists by Indian Union Muslim League workers in Kozhikode.

Once Rejina turned hostile and altered her revelation, the media channel faced financial difficulties due to reduced funding.

In March 2014, the Kerala Police registered a case against Indiavision and some other media organisations for the allegations raised against Mata Amritanandamayi and giving publicity to allegations levelled by Gail Tredwell.

=== Financial crisis and closure ===
In 2010, main journalist in the channel M. V. Nikesh Kumar left the channel. The company was in the news twice in 2014 when its editorial team went on strike over non-payment of salaries. Tax sleuths conducted a raid at the channel's main office in Kochi and its director, Jamaludeen Farooqi, was arrested on 4 March 2015. According to reports, the channel hadn't paid service tax to the tune of almost ₹9 crore.

Due to internal problems, it stopped broadcasting on 31 March 2015 by a journalist announcing it on air as a sign of protest to the management.

== Programming ==
- News
- Politics
- Varanthyam (presented by Adv. A. Jayashankar)
- 24 Frames (International movie reviews presented by Andur Sahadevan)
- Kaleidoscope
- Box Office
- Gallery
- Raag Rang
- Special Correspondent
- World This Week
- Debate the Week
- Colour Pencil
- Yugatharam
- Crime Patrol
- Mukhamukham – Face to Face
