= The Land of the Wandering Souls =

The Land of Wandering Souls
- Directed by: Rithy Panh
- Written by: Rithy Panh
- Produced by: Cati Couteau
- Cinematography: Prum Mesa
- Edited by: Isabelle Roudy; Marie-Christine Rougerie
- Music by: Marc Marder
- Distributed by: INA
- Release dates: 19 August 2000 (UK); 10 March 2001 (France)
- Running time: 100 minutes
- Countries: Cambodia; France
- Language: Khmer

The Land of the Wandering Souls (French: La terre des âmes errantes) is a 2000 French-Cambodian documentary film directed by Rithy Panh.

== Synopsis ==
The film follows a Cambodian family as they work to dig a trench across Cambodia to lay the country's first optical fiber cable, depicting their hardships.

At one point during their excavation, the workers uncover a killing field, a remnant of the genocidal purges of the Khmer Rouge.

== Reception ==
The Land of the Wandering Souls premiered at the 2000 Edinburgh International Film Festival. It went on to screen at around a dozen other film festivals, winning numerous awards, including:

- Banff Rockie Award for best social and political documentary at the Banff World Television Festival.
- Golden Gate Award for best current events film or video at the San Francisco International Film Festival.
- Best documentary feature (honorable mention) at the Vancouver International Film Festival.
- The Robert and Frances Flaherty Prize at the Yamagata International Documentary Film Festival.

The film was also featured on "Wide Angle", a Public Broadcasting Service television series.
