= Cambodia: Between War and Peace =

- Directed by: Rithy Panh
- Release date: 1991
- Countries: Cambodia; France
- Language: Khmer

Cambodge, entre guerre et paix (Cambodia: Between War and Peace) is a 1991 French-Cambodian documentary film directed by Rithy Panh.

The film, shot at the end of 1991 at the time of Norodom Sihanouk's return to Cambodia, questions the Cambodian people and explores the horrors and effects of the Khmer Rouge on them and what future they may look forward to.
