= Arms Control Association =

American nonpartisan organization

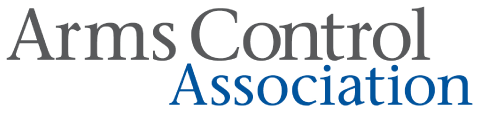
- Abbreviation: ACA
- Formation: Tax-exempt since January 1973; 53 years ago
- Type: 501(c)(3)
- Headquarters: Washington, D.C.
- Executive Director: Daryl G. Kimball
- Publication: Arms Control Today
- Revenue: 1,588,444 USD (2024)
- Expenses: 1,816,177 USD (2024)
- Website: armscontrol.org

The Arms Control Association (ACA) is a United States–based nonpartisan membership organization founded in 1971, with the self-stated mission of "promoting public understanding of and support for effective arms control policies".

The group publishes the monthly magazine Arms Control Today. It contains topical news updates as well as extended, footnoted articles. The ACA is located in Washington, D.C.

== Projects ==
Through its online content, print materials, and events, the Arms Control Association provides policymakers, media, and the interested public with information, analysis and commentary on arms control proposals, negotiations and agreements, and related national security issues.

== Staff and funding ==
The Arms Control Association is supported by grants from the Ploughshares Fund, the John D. and Catherine T. MacArthur Foundation, the Carnegie Corporation of New York, the Colombe Foundation, the New Land Foundation, the Prospect Hill Foundation, the Stewart R. Mott Foundation, and the William and Flora Hewlett Foundation. As of 2018, its staff includes:

- Daryl G. Kimball, Executive Director
- Kelsey Davenport, Director for Nonproliferation Policy
- Kingston Reif, Director for Disarmament and Threat Reduction Policy
- Tony Fleming, Director for Communications and Operations
- Terry Atlas, Editor, Arms Control Today
- Allen Harris, Production Editor/Graphic Designer, Arms Control Today
- Shervin Taheran, Program Associate
- Alicia Sanders-Zakre, Research Assistant
- Merle Newkirk, Finance Officer

In addition, there are two Fellows:

- Jeff Abramson, Nonresident Senior Fellow
- Terri Lodge, Senior Congressional Fellow

The Association hosts 3–4 interns during the spring, summer, and fall academic semesters, as well as a Scoville Fellow when selected as the host organization.

== See also ==
- Center for Arms Control and Non-Proliferation
- Control Arms Campaign
- Council for a Livable World
- Small arms proliferation
