= Bophana Center =

Audiovisual center in Cambodia

Coordinates: 11°33′41″N 104°55′18″E

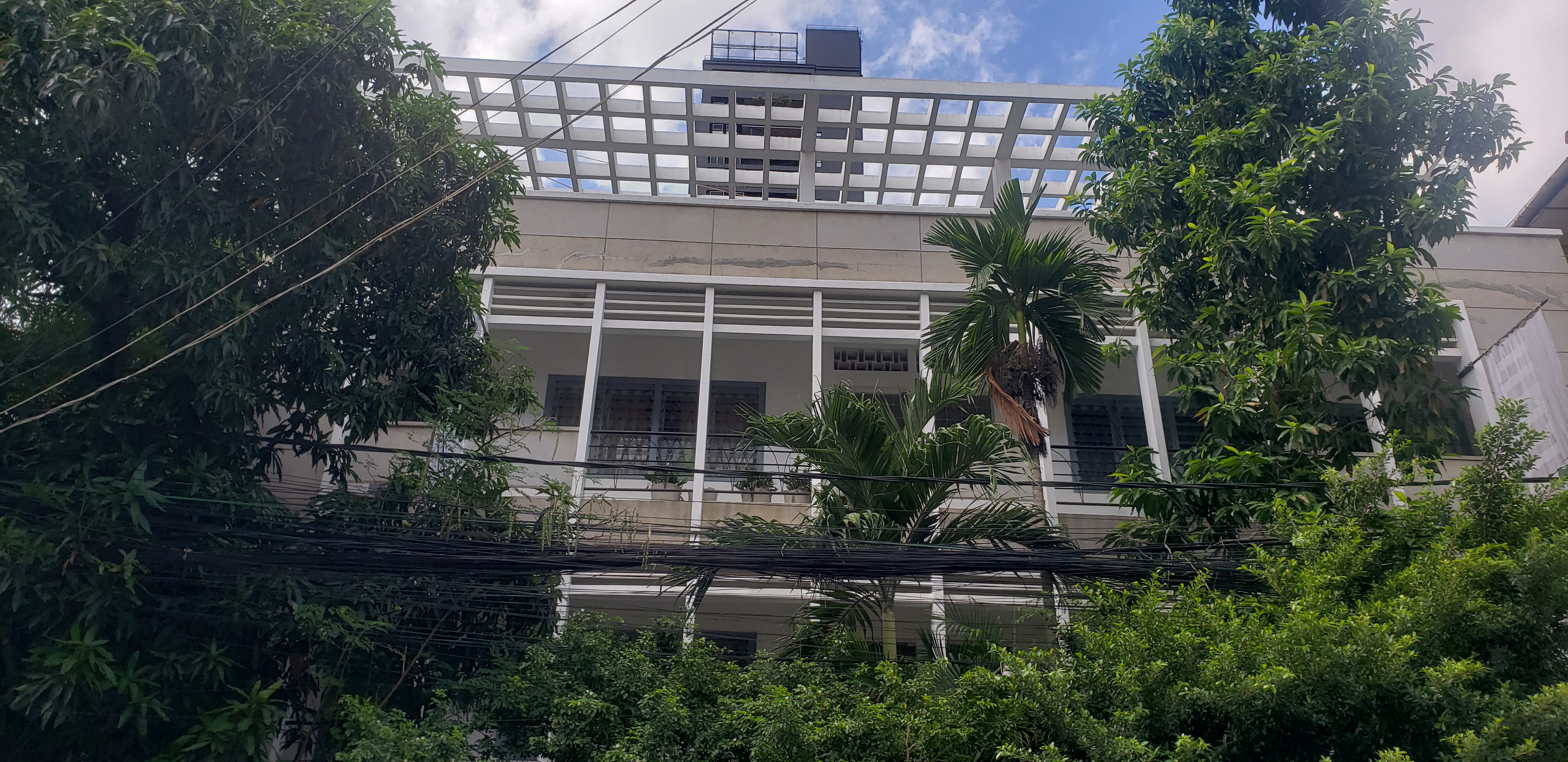
Front view of the Bophana Center

The Bophana Center is an audiovisual center located in Phnom Penh, Cambodia. The center is dedicated to restoring, protecting and enhancing the Cambodian audiovisual heritage.

The Bophana Center was co-founded in late 2006 by leu Pannakar and Cambodian-French filmmaker Rithy Panh. Rithy Panh has been critically acclaimed for his work. Most recently, he received the top prize of the "Un certain regard" competition at the 2013 Cannes Film Festival for his documentary The Missing Picture.

The Bophana Center is an official member of the International Federation of Television Archives (FIAT) and the International Federation of Film Archives (FIAF).

== The origins of the Bophana Center ==
As a survivor of the Khmer Rouge genocide, Rithy Panh moved to France in 1980. After rejecting the memory of his early years in Cambodia and then in the refugee camps in Thailand, he abandoned his carpentry studies to devote himself to cinema. He graduated from IDHEC in 1988.

Between 1975 and 1979, the Khmer Rouge destroyed the major part of Cambodian cultural productions. During the 1990s, Rithy Panh and Pannakar Leu, former director of the Cambodian Centre cinema envisioned the creation of a center dedicated to the restoration of the Cambodian audiovisual heritage.

The Bophana Center took shape during the early 2000s with the support of the National Audiovisual Institute (INA). It was inaugurated in Phnom Penh on December 4, 2006.

Since its launch, the Bophana Center has been fulfilling three goals: archiving, creation and training. It aims to contribute to the duty of remembrance associated with the Khmer Rouge dictatorship by collecting archives (audiovisual and written), organizing cultural events (screenings, exhibitions and conferences) and training Cambodian young people in cinematography.

"[The] role [of Bophana Center] is to give back remembrance to Cambodians. Forgetting is an affront to history and contributes to a deficit of democracy."

— Rithy Panh

The Bophana Center is named after a young Cambodian woman incarcerated in the S21 detention camp. During the dictatorship, Bophana would write secret love letters to her husband. That act of resistance resulted in her being tortured for several months. She was executed in 1977 when she was only 25. The movie Bophana: A Cambodian Tragedy, directed by Rithy Panh in 1996, tells her story.

== Architecture ==
The Bophana Center is located in the "White House", a building from the 1960s, whose style recalls Le Corbusier and Vann Mo-Lyvann. Surviving the Khmer regime and the successive phases of urbanization of the city, it was restored in 2006 to its original architecture with the help of Ministry of Culture and Fine Arts of Cambodia.

== The center's activities ==
=== Archives ===
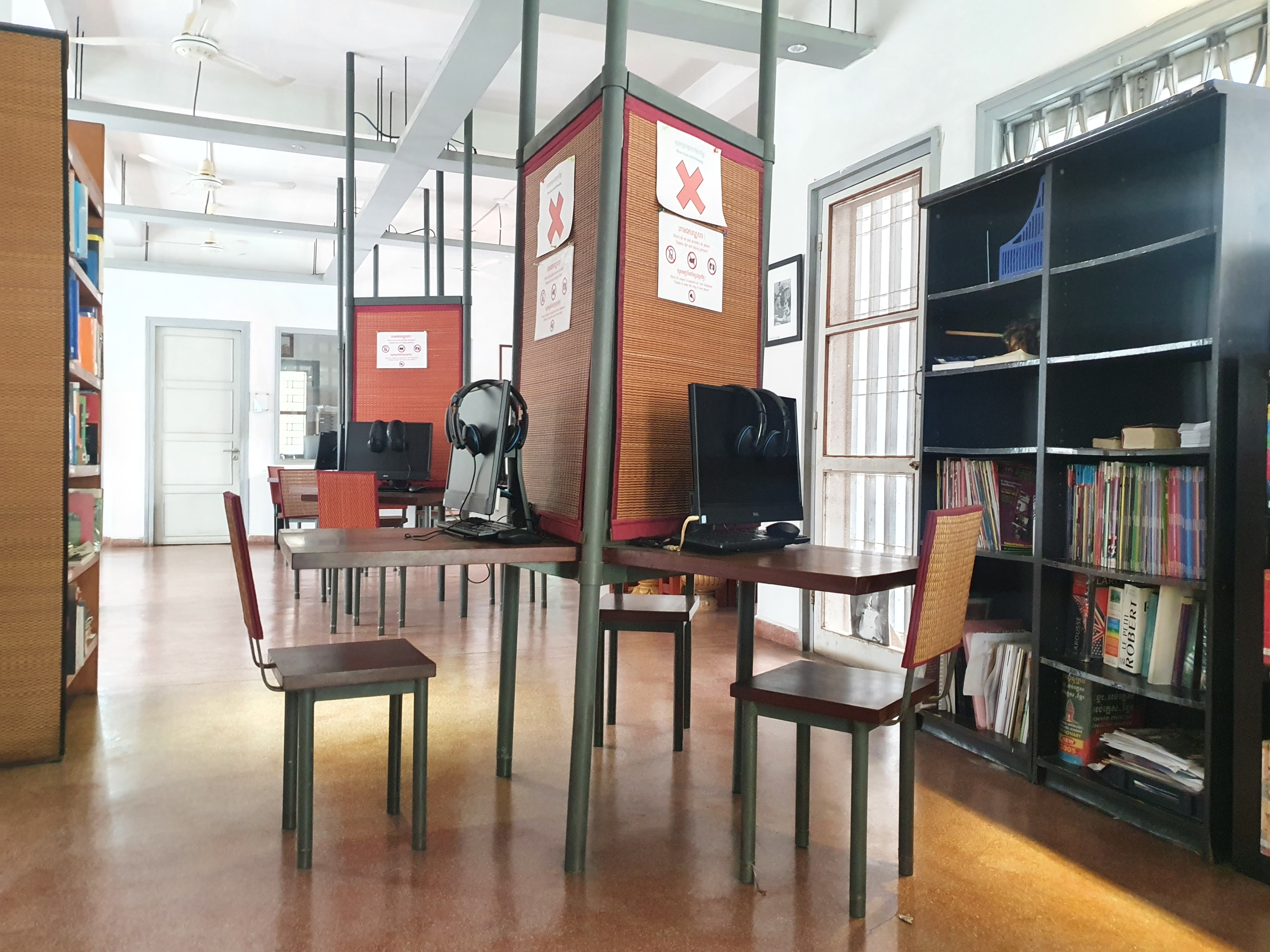
Archives Consultation Space at Bophana Center

The Bophana Center collects all types of archives from recent works of Cambodian filmmakers, through early films by the Lumière Brothers, to King Norodom Sihanouk's movies. The archives come from Cambodia, France and the United States. Over 2,000 titles, 700 hours of video archives, 210 hours of audio records and 10,000 images are listed in Khmer, French and English and available to the public for free on the "Hanuman Database" digital platform. To date, more than 240,000 people have visited the archives of the Bophana Center.

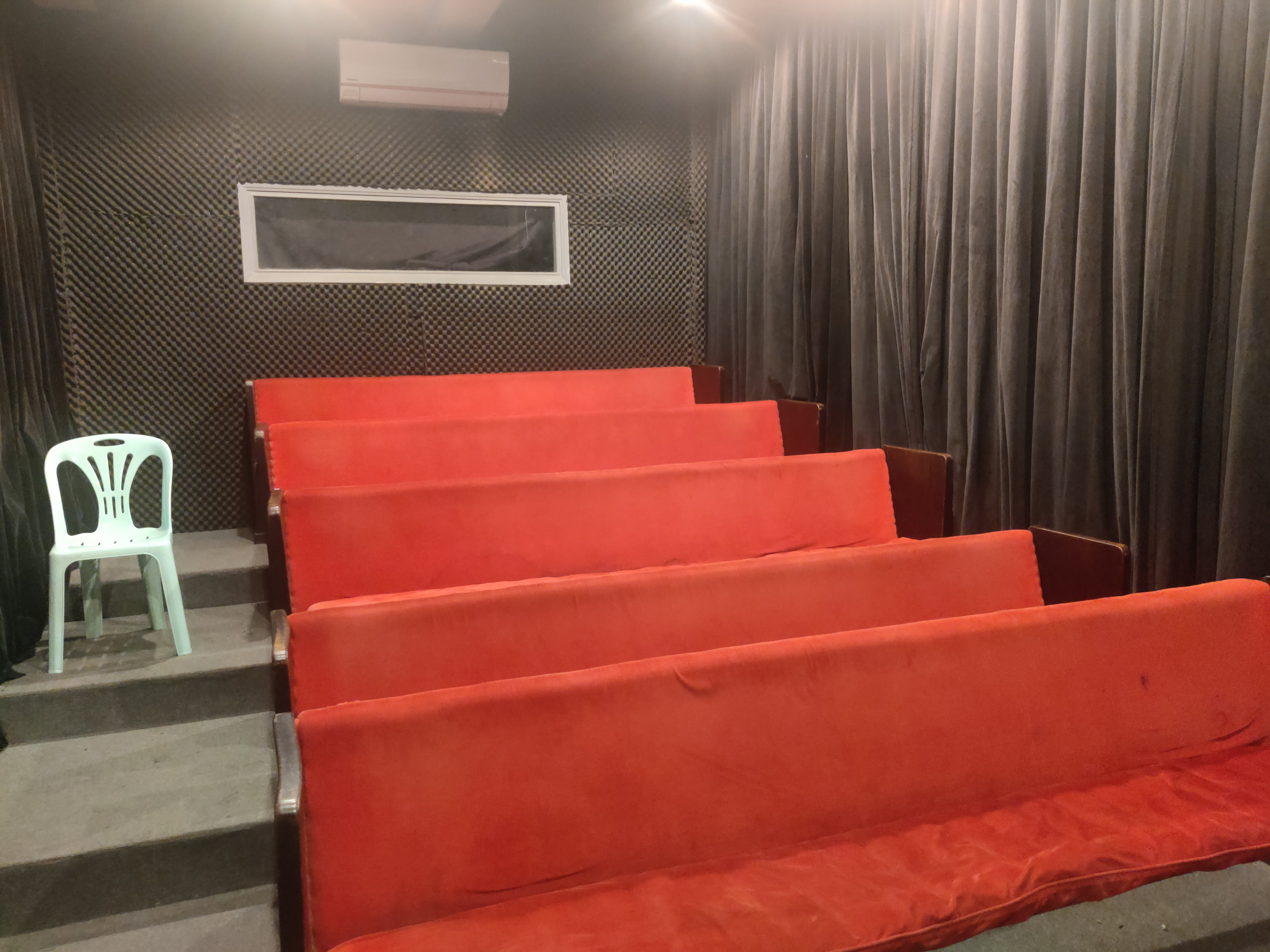
Screening hall

=== Cine Saturday ===
Each week the Bophana Centre organizes free screenings of classic, Cambodian and foreign independent films. The Bophana Center has also set up a free Movie Club open to Cambodians and aimed at young audiences.

=== Exhibitions ===
The Bophana Center regularly exhibits Cambodian and foreign artists whose work aims to represent the various facets of Cambodia.

=== Conferences ===
The Bophana Centre organizes conferences about Cambodia's history, architecture and traditions.

=== Film school ===
The Bophana Center has a film production that trains young Cambodians. They are supervised by Rithy Panh as well as movie professionals.

=== Library ===
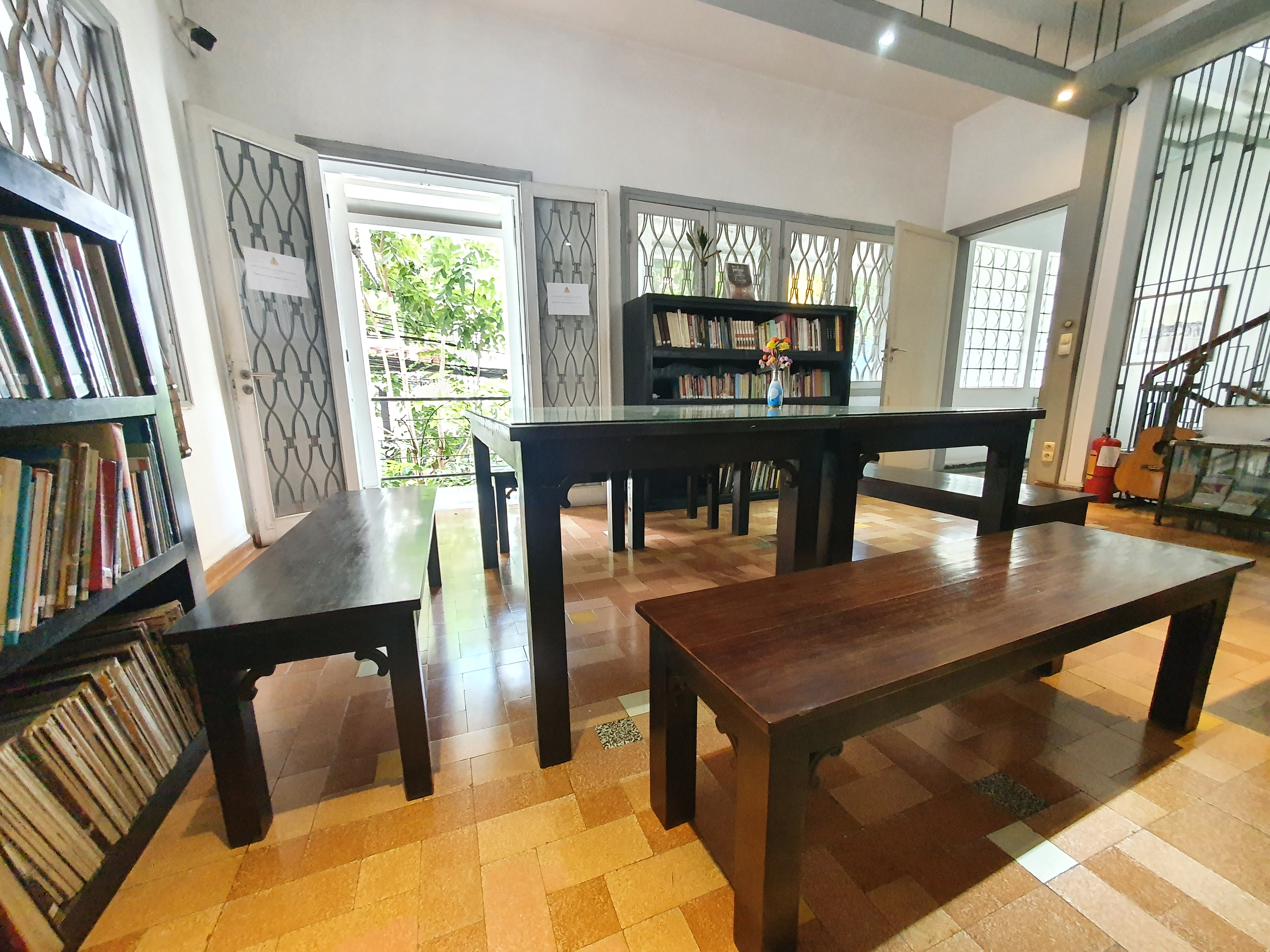
Library of Bophana Center

The Bophana Center have a free library for all publish user but under the condition of the center.

=== Cine Saturday ===
Every Saturday, Bophana Center have free screening for all audiences entry.

=== Mobile screenings ===
Since 2008, the Bophana Centre organizes traveling projections in the Cambodian province. Over 23 000 people attended in 2013.

=== CIFF ===
Since 2010, the Bophana Center and the Film Commission have been hosting the CIFF (Cambodia International Film Festival). The CIFF is free and funds films produced in Cambodia.

== The projects of the Bophana Center ==
=== One dollar project ===
Since 2014, One Dollar Project collects short films made by filmmakers from emerging countries in order to film the daily life of people living in poverty.

=== Elephant conservation and indigenous experiences in Cambodia ===
The center has created three documentaries highlighting best practices in elephant conservation as well as other topics.

== Services ==
The Bophana Center also has:

- a production and video editing department
- a library
- a research center on the Cambodian genocide

== Gallery ==
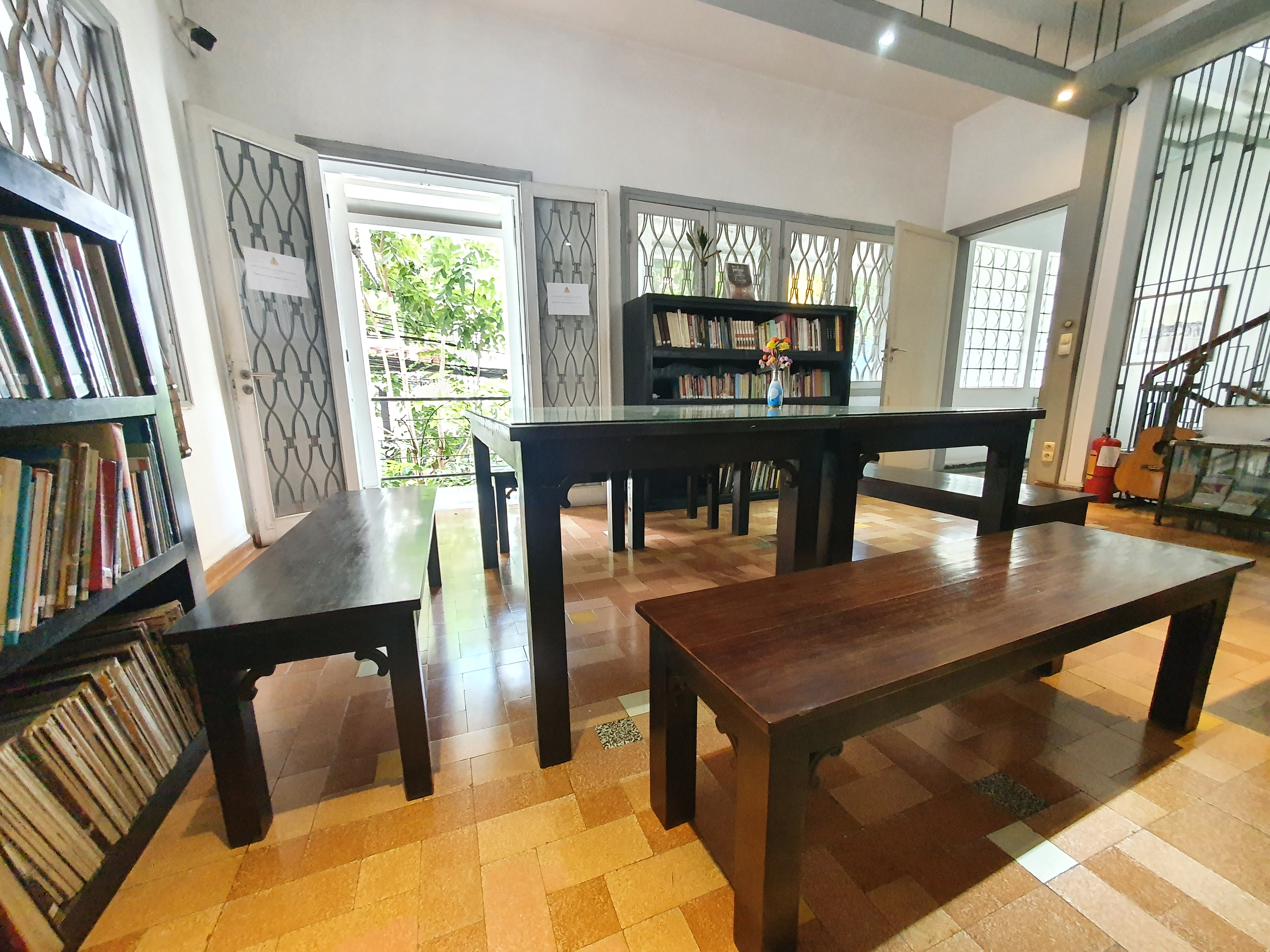
Archive Library Space

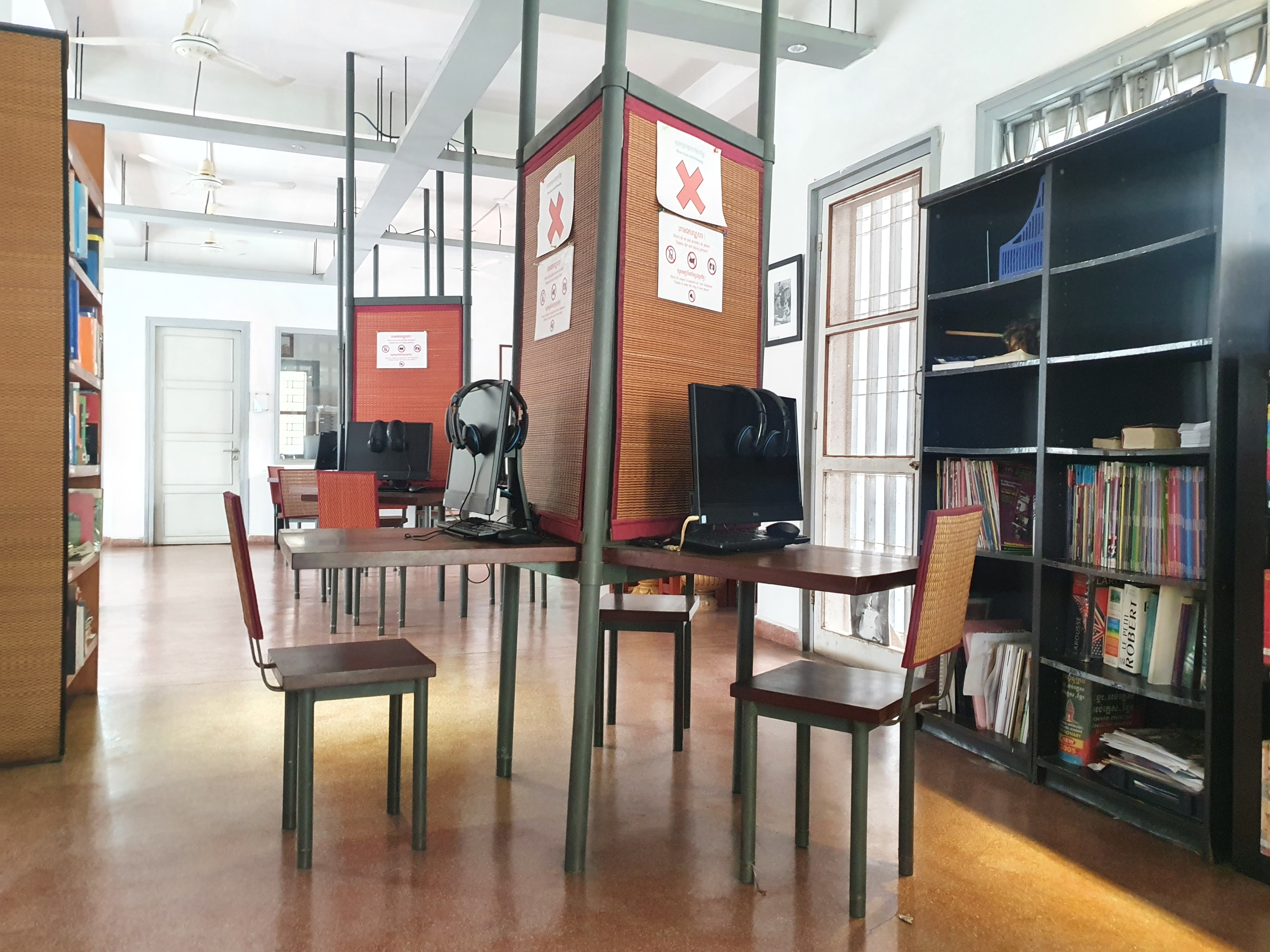
Archive Consultation Space

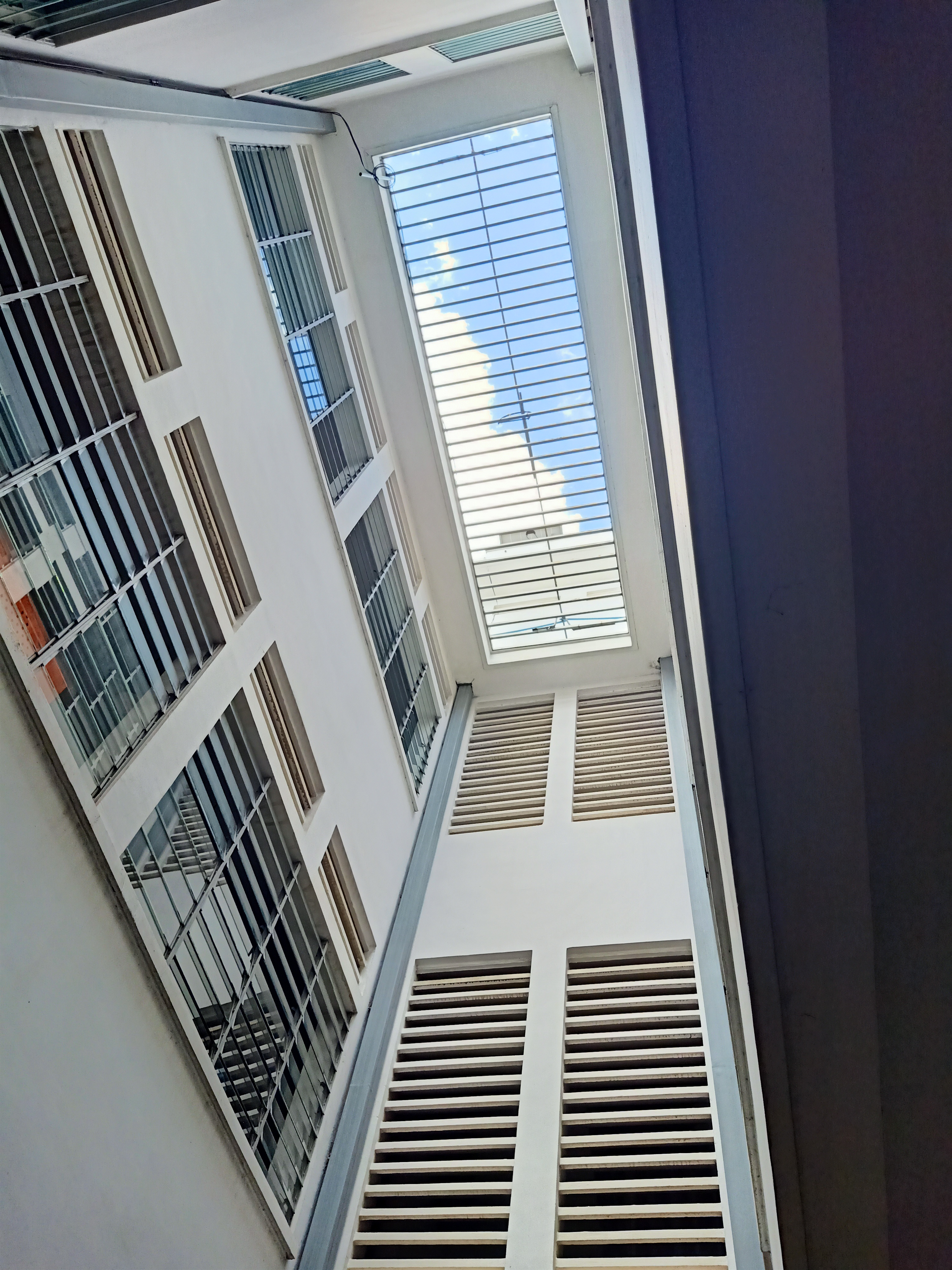
Rooftop of Bophana Center

== See also ==
- Bibliography of the Cambodian genocide
