= Sreyneath Reth =

Cambodian model and actor

- Born: Phnom Penh, Cambodia
- Citizenship: Khmer
- Occupations: Model; actor; beauty pageant participant
- Years active: 2016–present
- Title: Miss Cosmo World Cambodia 2023

Sreyneath Reth (Khmer: រ៉េត ស្រីនាថ; is a Cambodian model, actor and beauty pageant titleholder who won the Miss Cosmo World Cambodia 2023 in Phnom Penh, Cambodia. She also appeared in the film First They Killed My Father.
