= The People of Angkor =

- Directed by: Rithy Panh
- Written by: Rithy Panh
- Cinematography: Prum Mesa
- Edited by: Isabelle Roudy; Marie-Christine Rougerie
- Music by: Marc Marder
- Release date: 2003
- Running time: 90 minutes
- Countries: Cambodia; France
- Language: Khmer

The People of Angkor (French: Les Gens d'Angkor) is a 2003 French-Cambodian documentary film directed by Rithy Panh. It was exhibited at the Yamagata International Documentary Film Festival in 2005 and had its US premiere at the Tribeca Festival.

== Content ==
The film follows a young Cambodian boy around the temples of Angkor Wat as older men tell him about the legends depicted on the walls, and tourists tour the site.

== Reception ==
The People of Angkor was called "the most original film ever made about Angkor". The way the film focused attentively on the importance of spoken word was noted in a review in Trafic. In a similar manner, Les Inrockuptibles praised the sense of silence in the film.
