= Paper Cannot Wrap Up Embers =

2007 French-Cambodian documentary film directed by Rithy Panh

- Film poster
- Directed by: Rithy Panh
- Distributed by: Catherine Dussart Productions
- Release date: 19 March 2007 (Thessaloniki Documentary Festival)
- Running time: 90 minutes
- Countries: Cambodia; France
- Language: Khmer

Paper Cannot Wrap Up Embers (French: Le papier ne peut pas envelopper la braise) is a 2007 French-Cambodian documentary film directed by Rithy Panh.

In this film, the director examines prostitution in Cambodia.

== Release ==
The film premiered in January 2007 at the International Festival of Audiovisual Programs in Biarritz, where it was in competition in the creative documentaries section. The film was then screened in March at the Cinéma du réel - International Documentary Film Festival in Paris. It was then broadcast on French television on 30 March 2007, and received a theatrical release in France on 31 March 2007.

Paper Cannot Wrap Up Embers won the Magnolia Award for Social Documentary (silver) at the Shanghai Television Festival.
