= Aluva–Paravur Road =

Aluva-Paravur Road

Route information
- Length: 18 km (11 mi)

Location
- Country: India
- State: Kerala

Highway system
- Roads in India; Expressways; National; State; Asian; State Highways in Kerala

Aluva–Paravur Road is a vital 18-kilometre (11 mi) arterial corridor in Ernakulam district, Kerala. It connects the commercial and transit hub of Aluva to North Paravur.

== Connectivity ==
The road cuts through residential and commercial localities like Paravur Kavala, Malikampeedika, Kottappuram, Thattampady, Manakkappady and Mannam. The Union Christian College is situated along the Aluva–Paravur road.

It bridges the gap between the National Highway 544 (Salem-Ernakulam highway at Aluva) and National Highway 66 (at North Paravur).
