= Union Christian College, Aluva =

College in Aluva, India

Coordinates: 10.1262°N 76.3340°E

- Motto: The Truth shall make you free
- Established: 1921; 105 years ago
- Location: Aluva–Paravur Road, Aluva, Ernakulam, Kerala, India
- Website: www.uccollege.edu.in

Union Christian College, Aluva (known as UC College) is a college affiliated to Mahatma Gandhi University, Kottayam.

It is one of the earliest colleges in India to be established and managed by Indian Christians. It was founded in 1921 by four young graduates and teachers of Madras Christian College - Prof. K. C. Chacko, Prof. C. P. Mathew, Prof. V. M. Ittiyerah and Prof. A. M. Varki. It is situated at the Aluva–Paravur Road in Aluva, Kerala, India.

== History ==
The founders of the college were graduates of the Madras Christian College where they were contemporaries of Sarvepalli Radhakrishnan, the distinguished Indian Philosopher, academician and statesman, and the second President of India. They increasingly felt the need to establish a college in Travancore on the lines of their alma mater, but with a commitment to ideals of Christian ecumenism and national reconstruction.

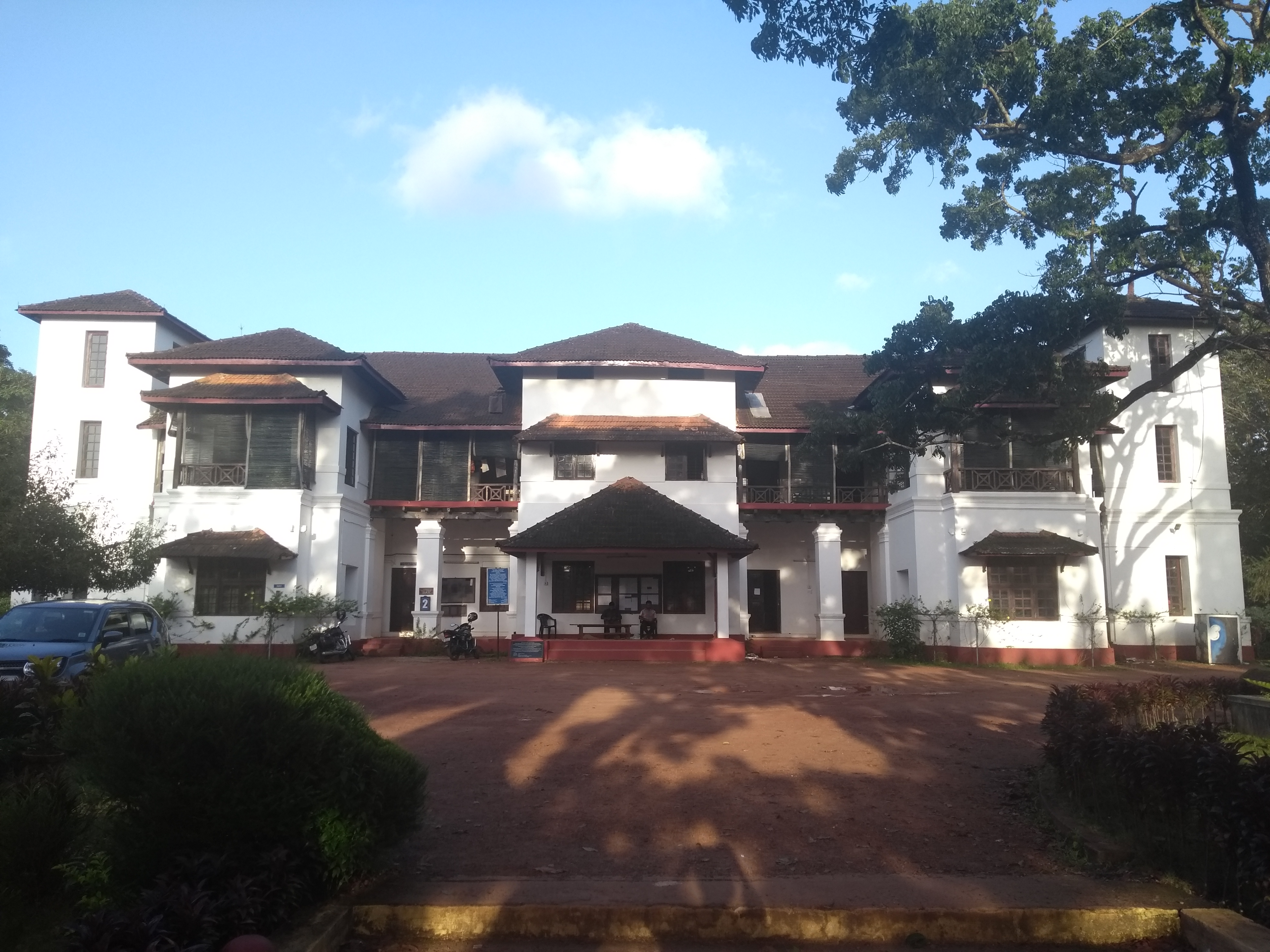
UC College, ALuva

The decision to establish a college was taken at a time when the churches in Travancore were involved in various legal and property disputes and would not see eye to eye. It was felt that the college would be able to bring the feuding churches together and enable it to witness the love of Christ in Indian society. The founders of the college also expected the college to contribute towards national reconstruction on the lines of national education that personalities like Mahatma Gandhi and Rabindranath Tagore envisioned. In fact, Gandhi visited the college in 1925 on his way to Vaikom Satyagraha and wrote in the visitor's diary of the college: "Delighted with the ideal situation". Tagore too visited the college in 1922 and remarked about the striking resemblance of the college with his own institution, Visva-Bharati, in Shantinikethan.

The college began in an old court house situated in the 18 acres of land donated by Moolam Thirunal Rama Varma, the Maharaja of Travancore with the financial support of well wishers. It began as a residential college with 63 students enrolled in the Junior Intermediate Class in Group III, and was affiliated to the Madras University.

The college was elevated as a first grade college under University of Madras in July 1923 and it is the first non-government college in Kerala to achieve that status.

The academic life of the college was modeled on the lines of the traditional gurukula system of education. Its founders sought to make the college rooted in the eastern tradition, using its principles to ‘keep the college near to the spirit and genius of our people.’ Despite its basis in eastern beliefs, the founders also allowed opportunity ‘to profit from the best counsel that western educational experience can provide’, especially its ‘humanistic and liberal tradition.’ This dual acceptance of both traditional values and the ‘cultures of all lands’ drew the attention of personalities like Gandhi and Tagore to the college.

The only missionary society to have co-operated with this Indian initiative in higher education was the Church Missionary Society (CMS) who had various mission centres in Travancore. The CMS missionaries who associated with the college as teaching faculty included Canon W. E. S. Holland, L. W. Hooper, B. G. Crowley, Stephen Neill. Well known English journalist and satirist, Malcolm Muggeridge taught at the college for a brief period. The college also received much encouragement from Dr William Skinner and Dr E. M. Macphail, both principals of Madras Christian College, and Dr L. P. Larsen, the well known Danish theologian and missionaries.

== Present status ==
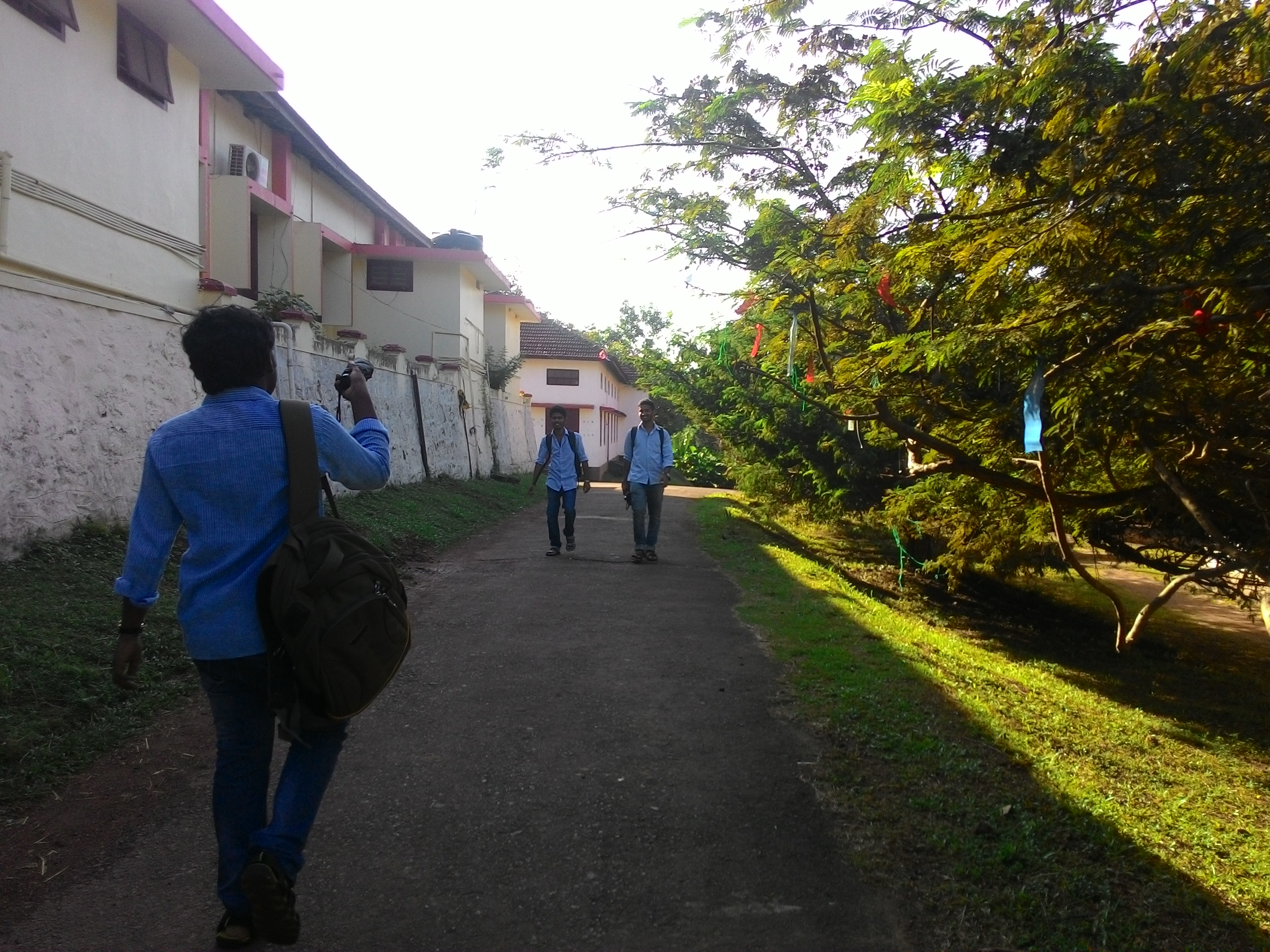
college Campus

Today, the college has become a first grade college with about 2200 students, enrolled in 14 graduate and 14 postgraduate courses in diverse disciplines. The college is now affiliated to the Mahatma Gandhi University, Kottayam, with eight of its departments being Research Centres recognized by the university, providing guidance and resources to more than 120 research scholars. It is one of the two colleges that went in for the first cycle of NAAC accreditation in 1999 and received five star accreditation. It had completed the fourth cycle of accreditation in 2017 with an A grade (3.47 score). It had also been awarded an A grade during the last cycle.

== Administration ==
The College is owned and administered by the Association and its Standing Council, which is constituted of representatives of the Inter Church Fellowship (ICF), an association of the permanent Christian members of the faculty who belong to the co-operating Churches and representatives of the four cooperating churches. The association elects the Board of Directors; the Standing Council runs the administration of the College through its Governing Board/Executive Committee. ICF ensures the participation of the faculty in the governance of the College and also carry forward the legacy of the founding fathers.

== Notable landmarks ==
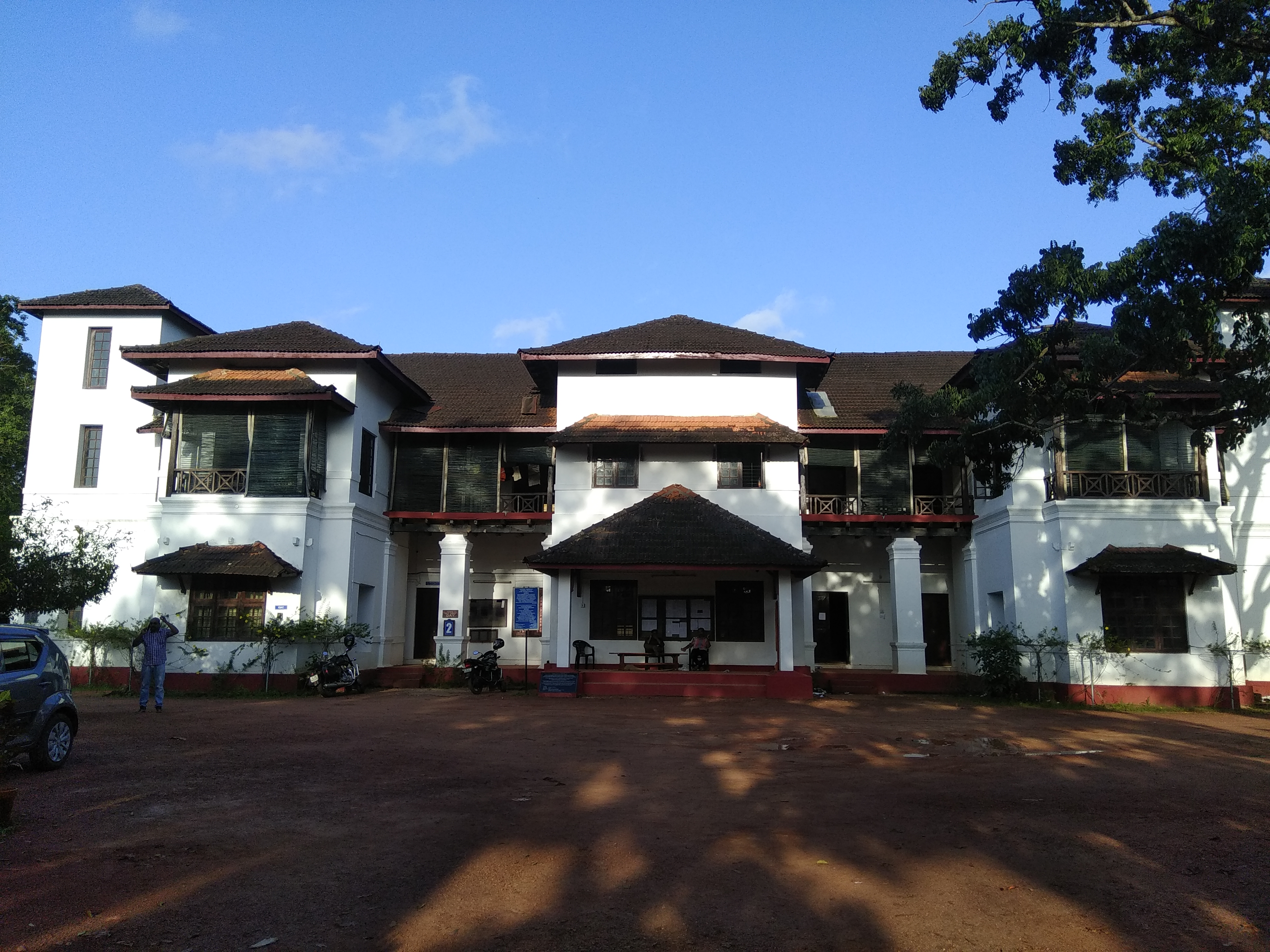
Kacheri Malika at UC College, Aluva, Kerala, India

Kacheri Malika is a two-storey building situated in the heart of the campus. In the beginning of 19th Century, this was a European Bungalow. From 1811-1896, it was used as a Zilla court of the Travancore state. It was one of the five kacheries (courts) built in AD 1811 during the reign of Maharani Gowri Lakshmi Bhai. Thereafter, till it was gifted to the college, it remained abandoned. It is built on a hill top known as Kacheri Kunnu and when it was a kacheri, the access to this hill was only by ferry. The ferry would be stationed at what was called Kacheri Kadavu. The architecture of the Kacheri Malika is a blend of Dutch, British and Indian styles. The structure, flooring, wood work of this building have been kept intact. In 1993, the Government of Kerala declared Kacheri Malika as a protected monument.

The Chapel is situated behind the Kacheri Malika. It is a place of worship that incorporates important aspects of both Eastern and Western traditions of Christianity. It is symbolic of the ecumenical tradition that the college embraces. The chapel was designed by Rev George Edward Hubbard in February 1940.

The mango tree situated in front of the administrative block was planted by Mahatma Gandhi during his visit to the college in 1925.

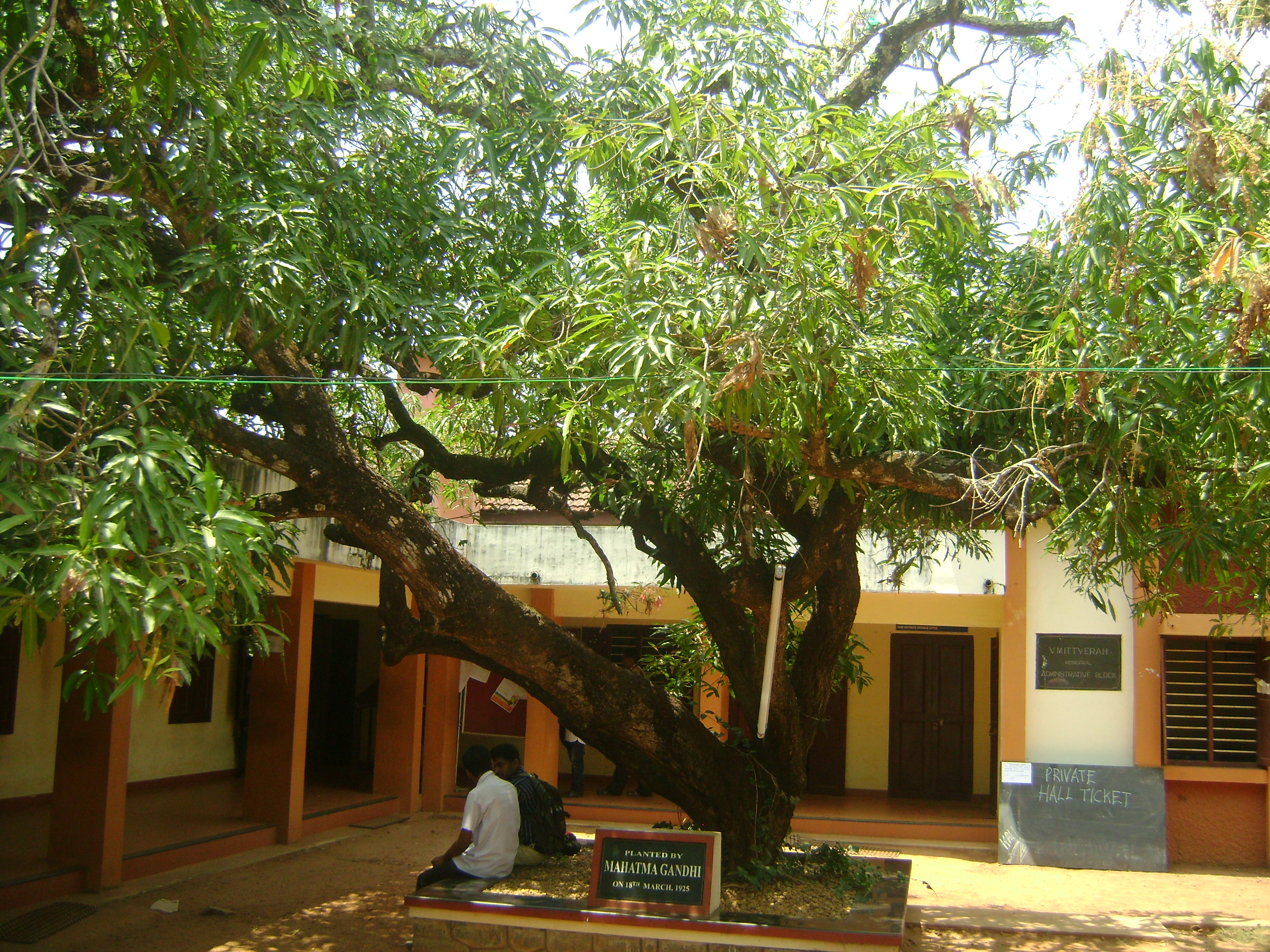
The tree planted by Gandhi in 1925

Mahaganitham is a sculpture commemorating the large mahogany tree that stood in front of the Kacheri Malika. The tree was struck by a lightning in 2002 and the remnants of it was designed as Mahaganitham. 'Maha' signifies the Mahogany tree and 'ganitham' Mathematics. Concepts like the Golden ratio and Fibonacci series are used in the design. More than thousand mathematical entities and geometrical shapes are engraved in the sculpture. The five Platonic bodies - tetrahedron, hexahedron, octahedron, dodecahedron and icosahedron - are present in it. An iron bell, which was used during the early period of the college, is also a part of the sculpture.

== Notable alumni ==
- Philipose Mar Chrysostom Valiya Metropolitan
- Fayiz Muhammed,Violinist
- Paravoor T. K. Narayana Pillai, last Prime Minister of Travancore and the first Chief Minister of Travancore-Cochin
- P. K. Vasudevan Nair, Communist politician and former Chief Minister of Kerala
- Nitya Chaitanya Yati, Philosopher and Writer
- NF Varghese, Actor
- Dileep, Actor
- Sathaar, Actor
- Lijo Jose Pellissery, Director
- Baburaj (actor), Actor
- Vineeth Mohan, actor
- A. Jayashankar
- Malayattoor Ramakrishnan
- Mathukkutty, RJ, TV Host
- Kalabhavan Rahman, Actor

== In popular culture ==
This college was the main shooting location of Malayalam movie Premam released in 2015.
