= Andur Sahadevan =

Indian journalist and film critic (1951–2022)

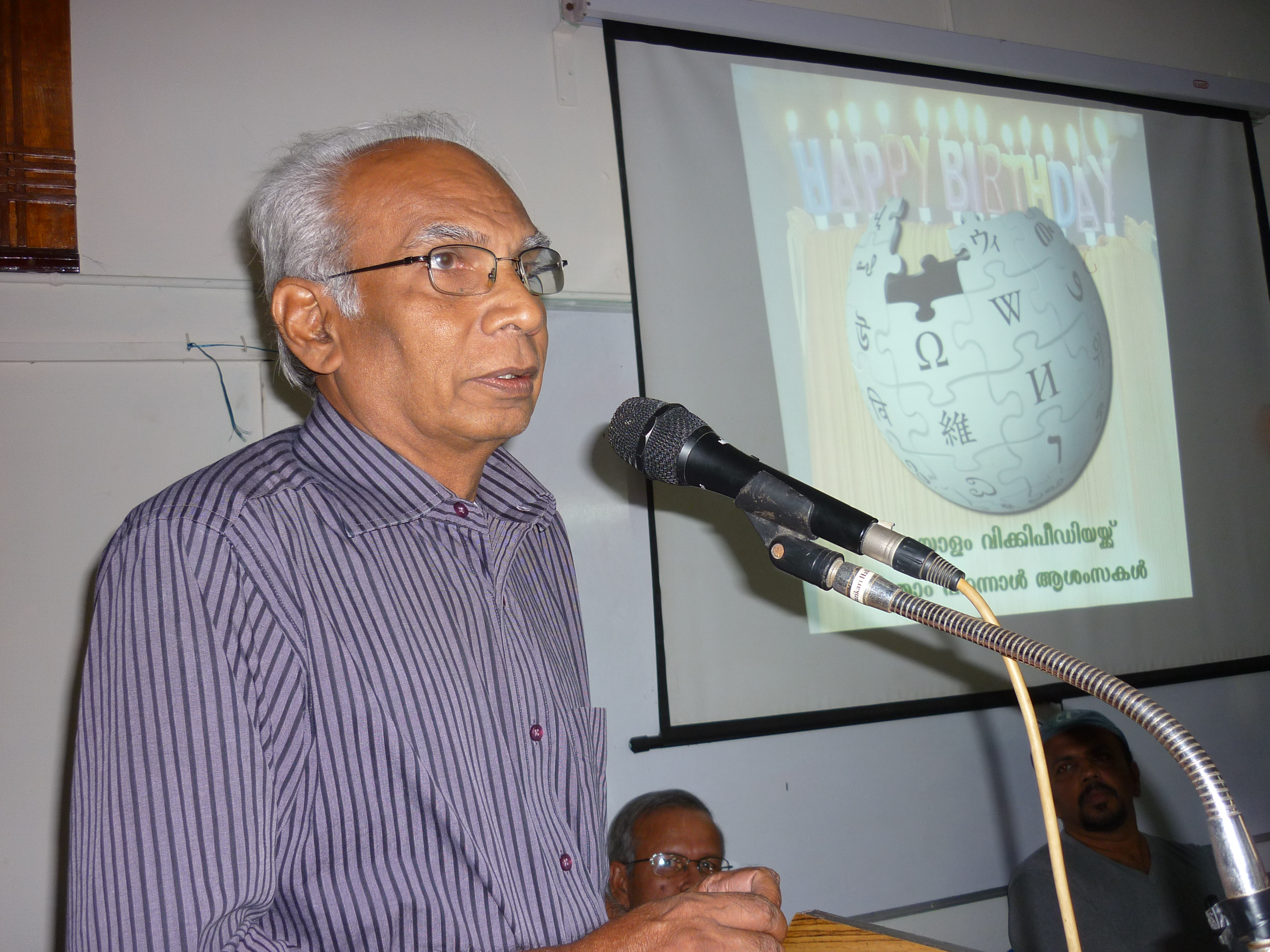

Andhur Sahadevan (15 October 1951 – 27 March 2022) was an Indian guest lecturer, journalist, film critic, and jury member with over 33 years of experience in print and visual media.

== Biography ==
Sahadevan hailed from the Palakkad District and lived in Karuvassery in the Kozhikode District. He and his wife Pushpa had a daughter.

He died at a private hospital on 27 March 2022.

== Career ==
Sahadevan started his career as a journalist in Mathrubhumi in 1982 and joined Indiavision in 2003 as a Program Consultant. He was a Faculty of Press Academy and served as a professor at the Manorama School of Communication (MASCOM).

He was the host of 24 Frames, a review of foreign art films on the Indiavision Channel, and World War II on the Safari TV Channel. Sahadevan also served as a jury member in the International Documentary category at the 2016 Indian International Film Festival.

He also worked as consulting editor at SouthLive.in.

=== Jury member ===
A three-member jury, comprising Kulikar Sotho, Sahadevan, and Dalton L presided over the 'International Documentaries' category, at the All Lights India International Film Festival in 2016.

== Works ==
- Kanathaya Kathakal (short story collection)

== Awards ==
- Pampan Madhavan Award 2006
- Kerala State Television Award 2010
- Television Chamber Award
