= Daron Ker =

Cambodian-American filmmaker

Daron Ker is a Cambodian-American filmmaker best known for his feature documentaries "Rice Field of Dreams" and "I Ride."

== Early life ==
Born in Cambodia two years before Pol Pot swept into power, Ker and his family were imprisoned by the Khmer Rouge in Battambong concentration camp from 1975 to 1979. During the fall of the regime in late 1979, his family was able to escape to a Thai refugee camp. Ker has stated that one of his earliest childhood memories was seeing Stanley Kubrick's epic "Spartacus" projected onto a bedsheet at the camp in Thailand, an experience that inspired him to become a filmmaker. In 1981, his family moved to Southern California after being sponsored by a local church group. After working for a time as a messenger in and around Hollywood, Ker moved to San Francisco to attend film school at the Academy of Art University.

== "Rice Field of Dreams" ==
His first film, "Rice Field of Dreams" saw Ker returning to Cambodia for the first time in almost thirty years to document the creation of the countries' first baseball team. "Rice Field of Dreams" follows Cambodian-American Joeurt "Joe Cook" Puk as he coaches Cambodia's first national baseball team to compete in the 2007 Southeast Asian Games in Thailand. The premiered at the Long Beach Art Theatre in April 2011 and will be released by FilmBuff in December 2011.

== "I Ride" ==
Ker's second film, "I Ride", is a documentary about the Fryed Brothers Band, also known as "America’s Biker Band". The film focuses on American biker culture, with Ker following the brothers as they travel the roads of America, playing concerts for motorcycle clubs, recalling old stories, and creating new legends along the way. The film is being released by FilmBuff is December 2011.

== Upcoming projects ==
Ker is currently developing his first narrative feature, "Holiday in Cambodia, " about a Cambodian immigrant who gets deported for being at the wrong place at the wrong time and because he isn't an American citizen. Although in the early stages of development, Ker has already recruited veteran Emmy-nominated cinematographer Hiro Narita ("The Rocketeer," "Star Trek VI: The Undiscovered Country," "Never Cry Wolf") to shoot the film.

Ker is also dedicated to helping create a modern Cambodian cinema and has stated he dreams of opening the countries' first film school.

== See also ==
- List of Khmer films of 2010
