= Bophana: A Cambodian Tragedy =

- Directed by: Rithy Panh
- Cinematography: Jacques Pamart
- Edited by: Marie-Christine Rougerie
- Distributed by: Catherine Dussart Productions; Institut national de l'audiovisuel; France 3
- Release date: 1996
- Running time: 60 minutes
- Countries: Cambodia; France

Bophana: A Cambodian Tragedy (French: Bophana, une tragédie cambodgienne) is a 1996 French-Cambodian made-for-television docudrama directed by Rithy Panh.

== Synopsis ==
Based upon documentation of forced confessions made during the Khmer Rouge era in Cambodia, and recovered during the 1980s, Bophana: A Cambodian Tragedy reconstructs the relationship of a young woman, Hout Bophana, and Ly Sitha, a former Buddhist monk turned Khmer Rouge cadre.

Bophana and Sitha met before the fall of Phnom Penh. Sitha, disgusted by the corruption of the Lon Nol regime, joined the Communist Khmer Rouge resistance, and the couple was separated. After Phnom Penh's residents were forced to leave by the Khmer Rouge, Bophana and Sitha were reunited, only to both be caught up in the genocidal regime's purges, in which they were arrested and taken to S21 prison, where they were tortured and forced to make confessions before they were both executed in 1977.

== Bophana, the Audiovisual Resource Center - Cambodia ==
Bophana is the namesake of the Bophana Center, located in Phnom Penh, Cambodia, which was co-founded by director Rithy Panh to collect and preserve Cambodia's audiovisual heritage.

The name Bophana means "flower" in the Khmer language.
