= The Elimination =

First edition

The Elimination is an autobiographical account of Rithy Panh's survival during the Pol Pot regime. It was co-written with novelist Christophe Bataille and published in 2011 by Grasset Publishing. This book is also an essay and report that documents the one-on-one conversations between Rithy Panh and Duch, a former Khmer Rouge officer. To better represent the Khmer Rouge regime and to further influence the reader's mind, Rithy Pan juxtaposed his own personal story with the interviews with Duch

Rithy Panh's testimony is in line with the most famous, such as Primo Levi and Claude Lanzmann. Using a detailed analysis of the horrors committed by the Khmer Rouge from 1975 to 1979, the Elimination reflects the totalitarian regime that claimed the lives of more than 1.7 million people.

An English translation by John Cullen was published in 2015 by Other Press.

== The author ==
Rithy Panh is a Cambodian director and writer born in 1962 in Phnom Penh. He first became known to the general public through the release of a documentary on the high school transformed into a torture centre, S-21.

Rithy Panh was 13 years old at the time of the genocide.

== The objective of the book ==
In The Elimination, Rithy Pan undertook to paint a portrait of Kaing Guek Eav - better known as Duch - and the first Khmer Rouge officer to have appeared before the United Nations courts for crimes against humanity, torture and murder.

The director recounts in parallel his interviews with Duch, which lasted three years, and how he felt about them. In the book, he explains that he initially tried to understand the reasons for this basic crime. But, quickly, he acknowledges that it is impossible to want to understand what is not understandable. His objective then became to push Duch to take responsibility for the crimes committed, to record by word what happened during these four years.

The Elimination is also a fight led by Rithy Panh against the falsification of history. Its literary and cinematographic productions present the same dynamic. Rithy Panh works against the erasure and denial of reality in a society where young Cambodians are confronted with overwhelming silence from their elders. One third of the population witnessed this period. Elimination makes the reader both a spectator and a repository of knowledge that he or she must in turn pass on. The author follows the approach adopted by sociologist Marcel Mauss

== Historical background ==
The Khmer Rouge have abolished all Cambodian institutions. The land was collectivized, schools and pagodas were transformed into torture centres. Angkar has established itself as the only legitimate organization to lead the country. Everything was submitted to Angkar: identity, social and professional life, as well as the family sphere. The only family that now existed was Angkar and the regime encouraged denunciation. Angkar gave new surnames to Cambodians in order to dehumanize them and remove all ties. Rithy Panh tells in The Elimination that he became Mr. Bald in reference to his shaved head. Mr. Panh writes: "From that day on, I, Rithy Panh, thirteen years old, have no more history, no more family, no more emotions, no more thoughts, no more unconscious. Was there a name? Was there an individual? There's nothing anymore."

Proceeding like the Nazi regime, the novlangue was mobilized. In short, the objective of the regime was elimination. During an interview, Duch said to Rithy Pan "Mr. Rithy, the Khmer Rouge is about elimination. Man has no right to anything"
