= A. Jayashankar =

Indian lawyer and socio-political critic (born 1962)

- Born: 21 September 1962 (age 63)
- Other names: K. Rajeshwari
- Occupations: Lawyer; Social critic; Writer; Journalist; Political analyst
- Spouse: Jaya (m. 2014)

A. Jayashankar (born 21 September 1962) is an Indian lawyer, and socio-political critic, who is a member of the Communist Party of India. He was known for his sarcastic articles published in Madhyamam Weekly under the pseudonym K. Rajeshwari. He anchored the weekly news analysing show Varanthyam in the Malayalam news channel Indiavision.

== Early life ==
Jayashankar was born in 1962 to Paamadath Vasudevan Pillai and Kalarikkal Saudamini In A Nair Family. He studied in Mar Athanasius High School, Nedumbassery, Union Christian College, Aluva, and Government Law College, Ernakulam. He obtained post-graduation in Law and History with top ranks. Working as a lawyer since 1989. Served as Government Pleader in the Kerala High Court from 1996 to 2000. At the age of 51, he married Dr. Jaya in February 2014.

== Works ==
He had served as a Government Pleader from 1996 to 2000. He is known for his sarcastic articles published in Madhyamam Weekly under the pseudonym Rajeshwari. He anchored a weekly news analyzing television show Varanthyam in the Malayalam news channel Indiavision. He appears as a political analyst in various Malayalam television networks. Jayashankar authored two books: Communist Bharanavum Vimochana Samaravum, based on the First E. M. S. Namboodiripad ministry and its dismissal, and Casting Manthrisabha, about the downfall of the Second K. Karunakaran ministry, a short-lived coalition government which survived just 81 days in Kerala with the help of casting vote. He was a member of the Communist Party of India (CPI) since 1986 and a member of CPI affiliated lawyers associations Kerala High Court Advocates' Branch Committee and the Indian Association of Lawyers. He was removed from the CPI membership with effect from 20 July 2021. Instead of renewing the membership, the party returned the Rs 1330 he paid as a levy, via Google Pay. The decision was taken after informing the state leadership and some senior leaders in CPI. The CPI Kerala state executive later cancelled the decision to expel Adv A Jayashankar from the organisation.

== Bibliography ==
- Communist Bharanavum Vimochana Samaravum (Mathrubhumi Books, 2012)
- Casting Manthrisabha (Mathrubhumi Books, 2015)

== Filmography ==
- 2023: Neru (News hour guest)
- 2014: Varanthyam (TV show) on Indiavision – Anchor
- 2014: Tamaar Padaar (film) – Narrator

== Opinion ==
- Opinion on various political subjects (YouTube, Jayashankar view)

He maintains a youTube Page on various subjects
