= First They Killed My Father =

Book by Loung Ung

- First edition
- Author: Loung Ung
- Cover artist: Loung Ung, Mary Schuck
- Language: English
- Genre: Memoir
- Publisher: HarperCollins
- Publication date: January 26, 2000
- Publication place: United States
- Media type: Print (paperback)
- Pages: 238 p.
- ISBN: 0-06-093138-8
- OCLC: 45831904

First They Killed My Father: A Daughter of Cambodia Remembers is a 2000 non-fiction book written by Loung Ung, a Cambodian-American author and childhood survivor of the Cambodian genocide. It is her personal account of her experiences in Democratic Kampuchea.

== Overview ==
The book is a first-person account, as seen through the eyes of a child, of the rise of the Communist Khmer Rouge regime in the 1970s, its enforced mass relocation of the urban population to the countryside to do manual labour (leading to massive levels of fatality), and the regime's eventual collapse.

The blurb for the book reads:

"Until the age of five, Loung Ung lived in Phnom Penh, one of seven children of a high-ranking government official. She was a precocious child who loved the open city markets, fried crickets, chicken fights and sassing her parents. While her beautiful mother worried that Loung was a troublemaker, her beloved father knew Loung was a clever girl.

"When Pol Pot's Khmer Rouge army captured Phnom Penh in April 1975, Ung's family fled their home and moved from village to village to hide their identity, their education, their former life of privilege.

"Eventually, the family dispersed in order to survive, but Ung’s parents were later killed by soldiers. Because Loung was resilient and determined, she walked to a work camp, where she was trained as a child soldier while her other siblings were sent to labor camps.

"As the Vietnamese liberated Cambodia by overthrowing the Khmer Rouge, the surviving siblings were slowly reunited.

"Bolstered by the shocking bravery of one brother, the vision of the others and sustained by her sister's gentle kindness amid brutality, Loung forged herself a new life."

The author later went on to live in the USA, and worked at the Campaign for a Landmine-Free World in Washington, D.C.

Nobody knows exactly—or even roughly—how many people were killed in the Cambodian genocide, whether by direct murders by the regime, or enforced overwork and starvation. For example, UCLA academic Patrick Heuveline wrote in 2015: "The range of estimates of excess deaths under Pol Pot's rule of Cambodia (1975–79) is too wide to be useful: they range from under 1 to over 3 million, with the more plausible estimates still varying from 1 to 2 million." If the estimate of 2 million is roughly correct, that would mean about one quarter of the country's entire population at the time was wiped out.

== Reception ==
The book was harshly criticized by Sody Lay, co-founder of the Khmer Institute — a site that describes itself as "a web-based information resource on Cambodia and Cambodians" —, for historical inaccuracies and cultural inauthenticity, accusing the author of back-filling details about her childhood in 1970s Cambodia using modern-day memories gleaned during a later visit to the country. For example, Ung gives a description of a family outing to Angkor Wat which would have been impossible as the area was at the time a war-zone. Lay also pointed out that Ung mischaracterised the Lon Nol regime as a time of peace and stability, when it was in fact characterised by warfare, corruption and civil disturbances, as well as severe state repression. He also takes issue with her depiction of her family as "middle-class", when in fact her father, a member of the brutal state security apparatus, owned three cars at a time very few Cambodians could afford one, and the family employed domestic servants. Finally, Lay suggests some passages of the Chinese-Cambodian Ung's memoirs displayed racism towards the majority Khmer community and minimised the degree to which they were victims of the Khmer Rouge's atrocities.

Ung responded to Lay's criticisms by acknowledging that there was a shallowness of analysis and examples of racism in the text, but that this stemmed from her choice to recount her narrative from the point of view of herself as a child. She stated that as an adult, she now recognised these failings and the "sins" of pre-Khmer Rouge Cambodian society.

Reflecting on this negative review in an article for the Society for the Study of the Multi-Ethnic Literature of the United States, Dr Bunkong Tuon acknowledged Lay's criticisms, while defending Ung's work. Instead of dismissing Ung's text outright, Tuon argued that scholars should read First They Killed My Father not to garner historical facts about the Khmer Rouge, but to experience its emotional truth and to consider its subjective, narrative gaps and fissures as a signifier of trauma and a testament to the destruction perpetrated by the Khmer Rouge. The article abstract reads: "Offering emotional truths as a complement to the historical truth toward which other Cambodian genocide narratives strive, Ung's text testifies to the brutality of the Khmer Rouge while laying bare the author's subjective experience of struggling to work and write her way through a traumatic past."

Richard Bernstein of the New York Times wrote in his review that the author was an "intelligent and morally aware" writer whose work gives the bare statistics of the genocide "far greater psychological force" with its "wrenchingly particular" first-hand account.

An unnamed review on the website Publishing Weekly called it "skillfully constructed", saying it "stands as an eyewitness history of the period, because as a child Ung was so aware of her surroundings, and because as an adult writer she adds details to clarify the family's moves and separations... this powerful account is a triumph".

== Film adaptation ==
The book has been adapted into a movie that was produced and directed by Angelina Jolie. The film premiered on February 18, 2017 in Siem Reap, Cambodia.

"The heart of it is Loung's story", Jolie states on the film. "It's the story of a war through the eyes of a child, but it is also the story of a country". To construct an accurate portrait of the genocide and war, Jolie used only Cambodian actors who speak their native language, Khmer. She gathered hundreds of survivors and their children to re-create their stories. The movie was filmed in Cambodia.
