= The Last Reel =

2014 film

- Film poster
- Directed by: Kulikar Sotho
- Written by: Ian Masters
- Produced by: Ian Masters; Sotho Kulikar; Murray Pope
- Starring: Rous Mony
- Cinematography: Bonnie Elliott
- Edited by: Katie Flexman
- Music by: Christopher Elves
- Production company: Hanuman Films
- Release date: 26 October 2014 (Tokyo IFF)
- Running time: 106 minutes
- Country: Cambodia
- Language: Khmer

The Last Reel (Khmer: ដុំហ្វីលចុងក្រោយ, Dom Fil Chongkraoy) is a 2014 Cambodian drama film co-produced and directed by Kulikar Sotho and written by Ian Masters. The film was selected as the Cambodian entry for the Best Foreign Language Film at the 88th Academy Awards but it was not nominated.

== Cast ==
- Rous Mony as Veasna
- Ma Rynet as Sophoun
- Dy Saveth as Srey Mom
- Hun Sophy as Colonel Bora
- Sok Sothun as Vichea

== See also ==
- List of submissions to the 88th Academy Awards for Best Foreign Language Film
- List of Cambodian submissions for the Academy Award for Best Foreign Language Film
