= Jean-Baptiste Phou =

Jean-Baptiste Phou is a multidisciplinary artist, published author, and director born in Paris, France, in 1981 to Chinese-Cambodian parents. Before focusing his career in the arts, he was working in finance. His work varies from theatre, film, visual art, and writing, exploring themes of diaspora, identity, migration, and minority experience, especially in the context of the Cambodian community. He is now living in Phnom Penh, Cambodia.

== Early life and background ==
Phou was born in 1981 in Paris, France, to parents of Chinese-Cambodian origin. His parents had fled Cambodia during the genocide led by the Khmer Rouge in the 1970s. He grew up in Paris within the Cambodian diaspora community, an experience that later became a big part of his artistic work, particularly his engagement with questions of memory, language, and belonging.

== Artistic career ==
Before pursuing a career in the arts, Phou worked in the finance industry as an investment banker in Spain and Singapore. In 2008, he officially shifted his focus to his artistic career, beginning with theatre and performance in France. During this time, he developed projects on migration, memory, and identity within the Cambodian diaspora.

His first widely noted work was the bilingual stage play Cambodia, Here I Am! (Cambodge me voici!), which premiered in French in 2011 and in Khmer in 2012. He wrote, directed, and performed in the production. The work depicts four Cambodian women of different ages and experiences, set in a Cambodian consulate in France. It explores memory, identity, and the effects of the Khmer Rouge. In 2014, Phou adapted the novel by Cambodian writer Soth Polin's L'Anarchiste into a solo theatre piece, in which Phou adapted, directed, and performed himself.

Phou directed a short documentary film that uses his sound piece of the same name (2011) as commentary, which premiered in 2022. The visuals are composed of black-and-white images with a touch of color, alongside white illustrations by Sao Sreymao. The piece explores the language barriers between Phou and his mother before she falls sick. The film was screened at international festivals and received the Audience Award for Documentary Films at the 29th Vesoul International Film Festival of Asian Cinema in 2023.

In 2023, Phou presented Murmures, an interactive sound installation created with sound designer Vincent Villa, at the Institut Français du Cambodge in Phnom Penh, Cambodia. Viewers are shown the recording of Phou's My Mother's Tongue (La langue de ma mère), which the installation draws inspiration from. In a darkened room, visitors hear the voices of strangers. The viewers are invited to record their own messages in the sound booths in the space. These messages are played and transformed into a constellation, which is released on Echoes from the Stars (2022), a digital installation also shown in the space. The installation is also an existing digital platform that he worked on, which allows viewers to add recordings of their voices, sounds, or anything they want to share. The uploaded messages become stars in the interactive constellation on the website, which others can listen to and share.

Alongside performance and film, Phou has published literary works. In 2023, he wrote his book, Coming Out of My Skin, which serves as a memoir of his experience as a gay Asian man living in the Western world. It explores the complexity of race and identity in a predominantly white and heterosexual world, which is drawn out from his life in France. In the same year, he published 80 mots du Cambodge, a collection of short reflections structured around language and cultural memory. 80 Khmer words were picked by Phou, which are then developed into short stories to explore their meanings and connection to the Cambodian context.

== Selected works ==
=== Theatre ===
- Cambodia, Here I Am! (Cambodge me voici!) --- (2011/2012)
- L'Anarchiste --- (2014)
- Coming Out of My Skin --- (2025)
  - Adapted from his memoir of the same name.

=== Film ===
- My Mother's Tongue (La langue de ma mère) --- (2022)

=== Books ===
- Cambodia, Here I Am! (Cambodge me voici!) --- (2017)
- Coming Out of My Skin --- (2023)
- 80 Words from Cambodia (80 mots du Cambodge) --- (2023)

=== Other media ===
- My Mother's Tongue (La langue de ma mère) -- (2011/2022)
  - A sound piece that explores his relationship with his Teochew-speaking Cambodian mother. It was premiered in 2011 at Triennale art nOmad, and published in frictions.co in 2022.
- Bits and Pieces --- (2022)
- Echoes from the Stars --- (2022)
- By a Thread --- (2022)
- Murmures --- (2023)
- Whispers to the Stars --- (2023)
  - A sound work and performance piece that was composed by the anonymous recordings of confessions from people who visited Phou's Murmures, as well as other recordings from Echoes from the Stars. The recordings are played as Phou makes offerings in a ritual of burning to turn the paper offerings into dust and release them to the sky.
