= The Missing Picture =

2013 film

- Film poster
- French: L'Image manquante
- Khmer: រូបភាពដែលបាត់បង់
- Directed by: Rithy Panh
- Written by: Rithy Panh; Christophe Bataille
- Produced by: Catherine Dussart
- Narrated by: Randal Douc; Jean-Baptiste Phou
- Cinematography: Prum Mesa
- Edited by: Rithy Panh; Marie-Christine Rougerie
- Music by: Marc Marder
- Distributed by: Les Acacias (France)
- Release dates: 19 May 2013 (Cannes); 21 October 2015 (France)
- Running time: 92 minutes
- Countries: Cambodia; France
- Language: French

The Missing Picture (French: L'Image manquante, Khmer: រូបភាពដែលបាត់បង់, romanized: roubpheap del batbng) is a 2013 Cambodian-French documentary film directed by Rithy Panh about the Khmer Rouge regime and Cambodian genocide. Approximately half of the film is news and documentary footage, while the other half uses clay figurines to dramatise the genocide's impact and aftermath on Cambodian people and society.

It was screened in the Un Certain Regard section at the 2013 Cannes Film Festival where it won the top prize. It was also screened in the World Cinema section at the 2013 Cinemanila International Film Festival where it won the Grand Jury Prize. It won Best Documentary at the 21st Lumière Awards and was nominated for Best Documentary Film at the 41st César Awards as well as for Best Foreign Language Film at the 86th Academy Awards.

== Overview ==
The film portrays the horrors of Cambodia's Khmer Rouge regime from 1975 to 1979 using a blend of animation, archival footage, and clay dioramas by sculptor Sarith Mang. Director Rithy Panh, who lived through the Khmer Rouge's rise to power as a child, escaped to Thailand and eventually settled in France, where he pursued a career in cinema with a focus on depicting the genocide and its aftermath in Cambodia. Panh, who lost numerous family members to the regime, embarked on this film as a personal quest to reconnect with his stolen childhood.

Through the narrative, Panh explores the loss of cultural identity inflicted by the Khmer Rouge, who aimed to forcibly reshape Cambodian society through radical socialism. The film illustrates the erasure of individual identities, with citizens reduced to mere numbers and the suppression of their cultural heritage. Panh's use of clay figurines to fill the gaps in his memories adds a symbolic layer to the storytelling, evoking the innocence of childhood while depicting the brutal realities of life under the regime.

The Missing Picture serves as an attempt to reconstruct a historical period where photographic evidence is scarce due to deliberate destruction by the Khmer Rouge. Panh underscores the importance of cinema as a tool for bearing witness and preserving collective memory, countering the regime's distorted narrative with his own truth-seeking storytelling.

== Cast ==
- Randal Douc as the narrator (original French version)
- Jean-Baptiste Phou (English version)

== Reception ==
The Missing Picture has an approval rating of 99% on review aggregator website Rotten Tomatoes, based on 88 reviews, and an average rating of 8.26/10. The website's critical consensus states, "Thrillingly unorthodox and emotionally searing without being didactic, The Missing Picture is a uniquely poignant documentary -- and so much more". It also has a score of 87 out of 100 on Metacritic, based on 23 critics, indicating "universal acclaim".

== See also ==
- List of submissions to the 86th Academy Awards for Best Foreign Language Film
- List of Cambodian submissions for the Academy Award for Best Foreign Language Film
