= Graves Without a Name =

2018 film

- Film poster
- Directed by: Rithy Panh
- Written by: Rithy Panh; Agnès Sénémaud
- Produced by: Catherine Dussart
- Cinematography: Rithy Panh; Prum Mesar
- Edited by: Rithy Panh
- Music by: Marc Marder
- Production companies: Catherine Dussart Production; Anuheap Production
- Release date: 28 August 2018 (Venice)
- Running time: 115 minutes
- Countries: France; Cambodia
- Languages: French; Khmer

Graves Without a Name (French: Les tombeaux sans noms) is a 2018 French-Cambodian documentary film edited, co-written, and directed by Rithy Panh. It was selected as the Cambodian entry for the Best Foreign Language Film at the 91st Academy Awards, but it was not nominated.

== See also ==
- List of submissions to the 91st Academy Awards for Best Foreign Language Film
- List of Cambodian submissions for the Academy Award for Best Foreign Language Film
