= Before the Fall (2015 film) =

2015 film

- Film poster
- Directed by: Ian White
- Written by: Ian White
- Starring: Ian Virgo
- Release date: 2015
- Running time: 98 minutes
- Country: Cambodia
- Languages: Khmer; English; French

Before the Fall (Khmer: មុនពេលបែកបាក់) is a 2015 Cambodian thriller film directed by Ian White. It was selected as the Cambodian entry for the Best Foreign Language Film at the 89th Academy Awards but it was not nominated.

== Cast ==
- Ian Virgo as Sonny
- Antonis Greco as Tony

== See also ==
- List of submissions to the 89th Academy Awards for Best Foreign Language Film
- List of Cambodian submissions for the Academy Award for Best Foreign Language Film
