= Herbert Scoville Jr. Peace Fellowship =

American fellowship program

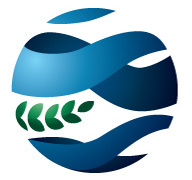
- Established: 1987
- Type: 501 c3
- Website: www.scoville.org

The Herbert Scoville Jr. Peace Fellowship is a national fellowship program that provides recent college and graduate school alumni with the funding and opportunity to work with senior-level policy experts at one of more than two dozen leading think tanks and advocacy groups in Washington, DC for six to nine months. It was created in 1987 to honor the legacy of Dr. Herbert (Pete) Scoville Jr. Scoville Fellows may focus on arms control and nonproliferation, conflict prevention and resolution, defense budget, diplomacy, environmental and energy security, terrorism prevention, and other international security issues. They attend policy talks, Congressional hearings, coalition meetings, and small group events with experts in government and NGOs arranged by the fellowship, and receive active mentoring and networking from the board of directors and former fellows.

Many Scoville Fellows have gone on to prominent positions in the field of peace and security with the Federal Government, domestic and international NGOs, academia, and media. The fellowship recruits from across the U.S. twice a year and provides a salary, benefits, travel expenses to DC for interviews and moving, in addition to a small stipend for attending conferences, policy courses, and foreign language classes.

== History ==
Herbert Scoville (1915-1985) was a nuclear arms control activist and held many professional positions related to arms control. Dr. Scoville worked for the National Defense Research Committee, the Atomic Energy Commission, the Department of Defense, the Central Intelligence Agency, the National Reconnaissance Office, helped found the Arms Control Association, and led the Arms Control Project at the Carnegie Endowment for International Peace. Herbert Scoville was also a graduate of Yale University and the University of Rochester, where he earned a PhD.

Dr. Scoville was at the forefront of arms control and nuclear issues and thought it was indispensable to motivate young people to get involved with the topic. The Herbert Scoville Jr. Peace Fellowship celebrates Dr. Scoville's life and career and provides an entrée for recent graduates to begin a career in Washington, DC focusing on international peace and security.

== Partnering Organizations ==
There are 26 partnering organizations with the Scoville Fellowship.
