= Rithy Panh =

Cambodian film director and author (born 1964)

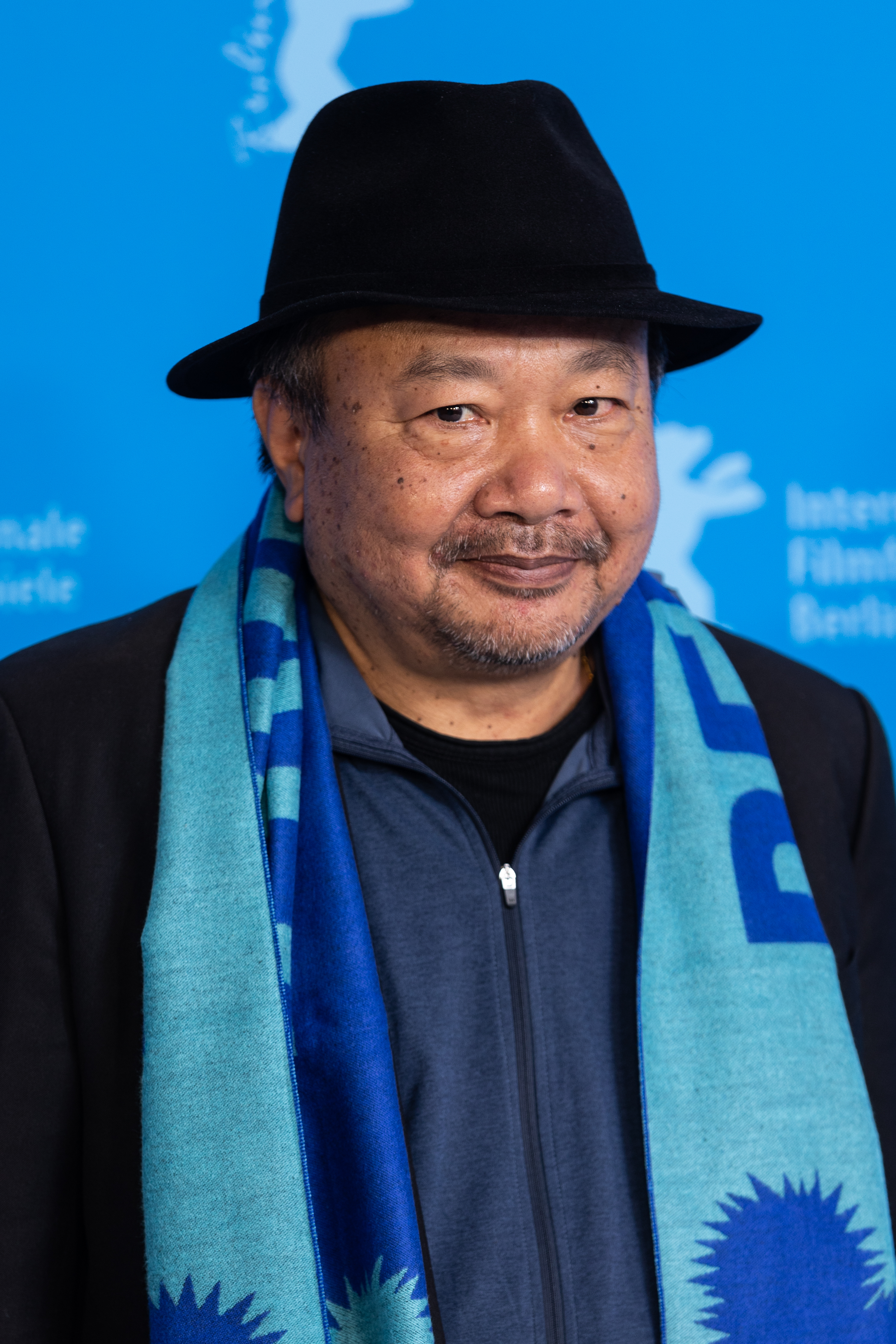
- Rithy at the 72nd Berlin International Film Festival, 2022
- Born: Panh Rithy; April 18, 1964 (age 62); Phnom Penh, Cambodia
- Citizenship: Cambodia • France
- Education: Institut des hautes études cinématographiques
- Occupation: Film director
- Years active: 1989–present
- Awards: Un Certain Regard; Albert Londres Prize; Joseph Kessel Prize
- Website: Bophana: Audio Visual Resource Center – Cambodia

Rithy Panh (Khmer: ប៉ាន់ រិទ្ធី; born April 18, 1964) is a Cambodian documentary film director, author and screenwriter.

The French-schooled director's films focus on the aftermath of the genocidal Khmer Rouge regime in Cambodia. His works are from an authoritative viewpoint, because his family was expelled from Phnom Penh in 1975 by the Khmer Rouge. One after another, his father, mother, sisters and nephews died of starvation or exhaustion, as they were held in a remote labor camp in rural Cambodia.

== Biography ==
=== Early life ===
Rithy was born in Phnom Penh. His father was a long time undersecretary at the Ministry of Education, a senator, a school teacher and inspector of primary schools. He is a practising Buddhist since childhood.

His family and other residents were expelled from the Cambodian capital in 1975 by the Khmer Rouge. Rithy's family suffered under the regime of Democratic Kampuchea, and after he saw his parents, siblings and other relatives die of overwork or malnutrition in the Cambodian genocide, he managed to escape to Thailand in 1979, where he lived for a time in a refugee camp at Mairut.

Eventually, he made his way to Paris, France. It was while he was attending vocational school to learn carpentry that he was handed a video camera during a party that he became interested in film-making. He went on to graduate from the Institut des hautes études cinématographiques (Institute for the Advanced Cinematographic Studies). He returned to Cambodia in 1990, while still using Paris as a home base.

=== Career as director ===
His first documentary feature film, Site 2, about a family of Cambodian refugees in a camp on the Thai-Cambodian border in the 1980s, was awarded "Grand Prix du Documentaire" at the Festival of Amiens.

His 1994 film, Rice People, is told in a docudrama style, about a rural family struggling with life in post-Khmer Rouge Cambodia. It was in competition at the 1994 Cannes Film Festival, and was submitted to the 67th Academy Awards for Best Foreign Language Film, the first time a Cambodian film had been submitted for an Oscar.

The 2000 documentary, The Land of the Wandering Souls, also told of a family's struggle, as well as showing a Cambodia entering the modern age, chronicling the hardships of workers digging a cross-country trench for Cambodia's first optical fiber cable.

His 2003 documentary, S-21: The Khmer Rouge Killing Machine, about the Khmer Rouge's Tuol Sleng prison, reunited former prisoners, including the artist Vann Nath, and their former captors, for a chilling, confrontational review of Cambodia's violent history.

More post-Khmer Rouge events are documented in the 2005 drama, The Burnt Theatre, which focuses on a theater troupe that inhabits the burned-out remains of Phnom Penh's Suramet Theatre, which caught fire in 1994 but has never been rebuilt.

His 2007 documentary, Paper Cannot Wrap Up Embers, delves into the lives of prostitutes in Phnom Penh.

The 2011 movie "Gibier d'élevage" (in French, "The Catch" in English), is based on a 1957 novel by the Japanese Nobel Prize writer Kenzaburō Ōe about the villagers' behavior when a black US Airforce pilot's plane is shot down and crashes over Japan (Cambodia in the movie).

The 2012 documentary, Duch, Master of the Forges of Hell, is about interviews with Kang Guek Eav, a former leader in the Khmer Rouge, also known as Duch, tried by the Extraordinary Chambers in the Courts of Cambodia and sentenced to 30 years of prison, but appealing against the conviction. However, he was finally sentenced to life imprisonment after the appeal.

His 2013 documentary film The Missing Picture was screened in the Un Certain Regard section at the 2013 Cannes Film Festival where it won the top prize and later nominated for a Academy Award for Best Foreign Language Film at the 86th Academy Awards, but lost out to The Great Beauty of that year.

In May 2025, it was announced that Panh would serve as president of the jury at the 78th Locarno Film Festival in August 2025.

== Bophana Center ==
Rithy, along with director Ieu Pannakar, has developed the Bophana Center in Phnom Penh, Cambodia, with an aim towards preserving the country's film, photographic and audio history. The center's namesake is the subject of one of his early docudramas, Bophana: A Cambodian Tragedy, about a young woman who was tortured and killed at S-21 prison.

== Political views ==
In December 2023, alongside 50 other filmmakers, Rithy signed an open letter published in Libération demanding a ceasefire and an end to the killing of civilians amid the 2023 Israeli invasion of the Gaza Strip, and for a humanitarian corridor into Gaza to be established for humanitarian aid, and the release of hostages.

== Filmography ==
- Site 2 (1989)
- Cinéma de notre temps: Souleymane Cissé (French television) (1990)
- Cambodia: Between War and Peace (1991)
- Rice People (Neak Sre) (1994)
- Bophana: A Cambodian Tragedy (1996)
- One Evening After the War (1998)
- The Land of the Wandering Souls (2000)
- Que la barque se brise, que la jonque s'entrouvre ("Let the boat break its back, Let the junk break open") (French television) (2001)
- S-21: The Khmer Rouge Killing Machine (2003)
- The People of Angkor (2003)
- The Burnt Theatre (2005)
- Paper Cannot Wrap Up Embers (2007)
- The Sea Wall (2008)
- Gibier d'élevage (2011)
- Duch, Master of the Forges of Hell (2012)
- The Missing Picture (2013)
- La France est notre patrie (2015)
- Exile (2016)
- First They Killed My Father (2017) - Only producer
- Graves Without a Name (2018)
- 30/30 Vision: 3 Decades of Strand Releasing (segment "From Hiroshima to Fukushima") (2019)
- Irradiated (2020)
- Meeting with Pol Pot (2024)
- We Are the Fruits of the Forest (Nous Sommes les Fruits de la Forêt) (2025)

== Bibliography ==
- The Elimination (2011)

== See also ==
- Cinema of Cambodia
- Am Rong
