= Kulikar Sotho =

Cambodian filmmaker

- Born: Cambodia
- Occupation: Filmmaker

Kulikar Sotho is a Cambodian filmmaker. She is the director of The Last Reel, a Khmer-language feature film, and the producer on the award-winning Ruin, which won the special Orizzonti prize at the Bienniale Venice Film Festival. She has worked on the feature films Lara Croft: Tomb Raider and Wish You Were Here, and on countless television documentaries for BBC, Discovery and other leading channels. She is one of the most experienced line producers in Cambodia. Kulikar is also the founder and sole owner of Hanuman Film.

== Films ==
- The Last Reel
- Beyond the Bridge
- Mekong 2030

== Nominations ==
- New Asian Cinema Award, Five Flavours Film Festival, for The Last Reel
- Asian Future Best Film Award, Tokyo International Film Festival, for The Last Reel

== Awards ==
- Spirit of Asia Award, Tokyo International Film Festival, for The Last Reel
- Founders Prize Best Film Award, Traverse City Film Festival, for The Last Reel
- Black Dragon Audience Award, Udine Far East Film Festival, for The Last Reel

== Jury member ==
A 3-member jury, comprising Kulikar Sotho, Andur Sahadevan, and Dalton L presided over the 'International Documentaries' category, at the All Lights India International Film Festival in 2016, and handed out the following awards:

- Best Documentary Film - The Great Transmission (USA) directed by Pema Gellek
- Honorable Mention 1 - Vanishing Island (India) directed by D. Dhanasumod
- Honorable Mention 2 - Smajl (Germany) directed by Philipp Majer
- Special Mention, Best Educational Film - Take Over (India) directed by Jennifer Alphonsse
