= Exile (2016 film) =

- Film poster
- Exil
- Directed by: Rithy Panh
- Written by: Rithy Panh
- Produced by: Catherine Dussart
- Narrated by: Randal Douc
- Cinematography: Rithy Panh; Mesat Prum
- Edited by: Rithy Panh
- Music by: Marc Marder
- Production companies: Catherine Dussart Production; Bophana Production
- Release date: 13 May 2016 (Cannes)
- Running time: 78 minutes
- Countries: Cambodia; France
- Languages: French; Khmer

Exile (French: Exil) is a 2016 Cambodian-French documentary film edited, written, and directed by Rithy Panh which explores the effects of forced displacement. It was selected to screen in the Special Screenings section of the 2016 Cannes Film Festival.

== Featuring ==
- Randal Douc as the narrator
- Sang Nan

== Production ==
Filmmaker Rithy Panh made the film to depict his acts of defiance during the rule of the Khmer Rouge in Kampuchea (now Cambodia), reflecting on "how, when faced with acts of barbarism, one might resist."
