= Buku FIXI =

Malaysian fictional work publisher

Buku FIXI is a Malaysian independent publisher founded in 2011 by filmmaker Amir Muhammad. The company specializes not only in contemporary urban fiction - both in Malay and English - but also Malay translations of foreign titles, and graphic novels. Some of these novels have also been adapted into films, bringing the publisher's name further into the Malaysian mainstream.

On 11 April 2015, Buku Fixi’s own flagship bookstore known as Kedai Fixi was launched in Jaya Shopping Centre in Petaling Jaya. Its current flagship bookstore is in Sunway Putra Mall, Kuala Lumpur. Another store in Setia Alam opened on 1 April 2021.

== History ==
Amir Muhammad, who has directed a number of film titles that were deemed too controversial to be screened in Malaysia, was inspired to establish the company after attending a local book awards ceremony. There, he had discovered that almost all of the Malay language fiction nominees were entirely in the romance genre. Thus, the creation of the label is considered to be his reaction from a need to further diversify the range of popular Malay literature that was produced at that time. He decided on the name "FIXI" for the label, which derives from the Dutch-derived Indonesian word fiksi or 'fiction'. According to him, the naming of the company was his tongue-in-cheek statement hinting that "nothing is original in the world of novels".

=== Books ===
The first three books published were Kougar (by Shaz Johar), Cekik (by Ridhwan Saidi) and Pecah (by Khairunizam Bakeri). These books were reprinted for their 10th anniversary in 2021. Since then, Fixi has published over 200 books including short stories, ebooks, trilogies, limited edition titles and those published under imprints of Fixi Novo (English fiction), Fixi Verso (translation of English fictions to Malay) and Fixi Retro (republishing of local Malay novels no longer in distribution or circulation).

A few of Fixi novels were adapted into films. In 2013, Pecah was adapted into a film directed by Asrulhisyam Ahmad and screenplay by Sha Hanim Ramli, starring Tony Eusoff, Sofi Jikan and Izreen Azminda. In the same year, KL Zombi (original title, Zombijaya) written by Adib Zaini was released and starring Zizan Razak, Siti Saleha and Izara Aishah. The film was directed by Woo Ming Jin. Some short stories from Kopi (Fixi's limited edition book release) were adapted into short films. A DVD titled Kumpulan Filem Pendek Kopi was released with eight short films. Nadia Khan's Gantung (published 2013) was adapted into a drama series in 2016 with Malaysian and Indonesian cast. Gantung The Series was released on Tribe in Indonesia, and Astro and Mubi in Malaysia.

Since 2017, Fixi organises its biennial Malay novel writing contest, Sayembara Fixi where six titles are selected as winners. The six winning titles were launched at the Kuala Lumpur International Book Fair, except for the 2019/2020 contest where the book fair was cancelled due to the Covid-19 pandemic.

Apart from standalone novels, Buku Fixi also publishes a number of trilogies. Originally published with different book covers, the reprinted versions of the trilogies have triptych book cover designs that connect to each other when placed side by side. A number of four trilogies were published and printed in 2015 by Syaihan Syafiq, Gina Yap Lai Yoong, Hasrul Rizwan and Syafiq Aizat.

Buku Fixi also published compilations of short stories from its famous authors. Cerpen Hari Jumaat Vol 1 & 2, and Cerpen Terbaik 2014 & 2016 are compilations of short stories from various authors.

In 2012, Buku Fixi started publishing limited editions series which were novels and themed anthologies. With a limited print of 1,500 copies, Kopi was the first of the series. Some of the short stories were adapted into short films and compiled for a DVD release. Some of the anthologies were published in conjunction with an event. Garis was published in conjunction with the 2015 Malaysia Unesco Day and W an anthology of photographs and proses, was published for Ikal Mayang 2016, a women’s empowerment festival. Limited edition standalone novels were Profesor (Faisal Tehrani) and Budiman (Regina Ibrahim), both published in 2017. Other limited editions were collectible hardbacks of famous novels. Pecah (Khairulnizam Bakeri) was printed in hardback format in conjunction with the release of its film adaptation in 2013. In 2019, Buku Fixi printed hardback versions of Nikina (Nadia Khan), Fantastik (Hasrul Rizwan) and Anomali (Syafiq Aizat) for the Kuala Lumpur International Book Fair. A prequel to Nadia Khan’s Gantung, Musketeer was published in hardback format to crowd fund for Gantung The Movie.

== Imprints ==
=== FIXI Novo ===
This imprint showcases Malaysian English-language fiction produced in-house by the company. Kris Williamson's Son Complex was the first novel published under Fixi Novo in 2013. Since then, more English pulp fiction novels written by local authors were published, as well as a number of anthologies including the acclaimed KL Noir series (Red, Blue, White and Yellow). The series was revived after seven years with KL Noir Magic in 2021, edited by Deric Ee.

Other anthologies from Fixi were inspired by various locations in Malaysia, with contributors from local authors or anyone who has a story or experience of that certain place. Love In Penang was the first book stemming from this idea, published in 2013, edited by Anna Tan. The last anthology which was based on a location in Malaysia was Chronicles of KK. The KK in the title stands for Kota Kinabalu the capital city of Sabah, Malaysian Borneo. The anthology was launched in Times Book Store, Suria Sabah, Kota Kinabalu in 2016.

Aside from publishing local and Malaysian based authors, Fixi Novo has contributors from the South East Asian regions with its tryptic anthologies, Heat, Flesh and Trash. Writers were free to interpret the themes of each book but stories must be set in urban Southeast Asia. With 50 selected writers from seven countries, the book covers featured the durian fruit itself, the yellow flesh of the durian and lastly, the durian skin and seeds to represent the theme of each book. Heat, Flesh and Trash were launched in the 45th London Book Fair in 2016.

Also launched during the 2016 45th London Book Fair was Fixi Novo’s annual literary journal, Little Basket, for new Malaysian writings. Little Basket 2016 was an effort of putting together a limited edition book with works from local authors, to fundraise the cost to participate in the book fair. The journal also included drawings, comics and doodles. Little Basket 2018 was the last journal published.

In June 2017, Michelle Yoon published her book, Before We Forget with Fixi Novo. It was adapted from the sequel of The Kid From The Big Apple, based on the screenplay by Jess Teong. The following year, the novel won first prize at the Popular’s Readers Choice Award, organised by BookFest Malaysia. An English language comic book adaptation of The Kid From The Big Apple 2 was published by Maple Comics in 2017, also based on Jess Teong’s screenplay but the comic adaptation was by Comic Soul.

After the call for entries in search for Malaysian Crime Novels, Jill Girardi’s Hantu Macabre was selected as the sole winner among 18 entries. With RM5,000 royalty advance prize, the competition was judged by Brian Gomez, Chuah Guat Eng and Mamü Vies. In 2019, a Singaporean production company, 108 Media in collaboration with Siung Films (Malaysia), announced a horror-action film adaptation of Girardi’s short story, “Don’t Eat The Rice”. The film adaptation by Aaron Cowan will also be based on some of the characters from Hantu Macabre.

In 2020, Fixi Novo held its first Malaysian Novel Contest. Terence Toh's Toyol 'R' Us was chosen as the winning novel.

=== FIXI Verso ===
The intent behind Fixi Verso is to translate famous fictions of renowned established authors. The first two books translated and published under this imprint are Stephen King’s Joyland and Neil Gaiman’s Ocean At The End The Lane (Malay language title: Lautan Di Hujung Lorong). Joyland was the first ever Stephen King book to be translated to the Malay language.

Other famous fictions translated to the Malay language were John Green's The Fault In Our Stars (Tertulis Di Bintang-Bintang) and Paper Towns (Pekan-Pekan Kertas), Rainbow Rowell’s Eleanor & Park, Haruki Murakami’s Colourless Tsukuru Tazaki and His Pilgrimage Years (Tsukuru Tazaki Tanpa Warna dan Tahun-Tahun Kembara), Dave Eggers’ A Hologram For The King (Hologram Untuk Raja), and David Cronenberg’s Consume (Konsum).

Malaysian authors whose books published by international publishers also had their books translated into Malay. Malaysian born, London based Felicia Yap’s novel, Yesterday (published under Wildifire Books, UK) was published in 2017 with the title Semalam. Zalikha Yaacob & Anida Adam were the translators.

The Weight of Our Sky, a young adult historical fiction set during the race riot in May 1969 by Malaysian based author Hanna Alkaf was published in 2019 by Salaam Reads, an imprint by Simon & Schuster. Buku Fixi obtained the translation rights and later that year, Disitu Langit Dijunjung was published, translated by Fahmi Mustafa.

=== GRAFIXI ===
In 2016, Buku Fixi announced Grafixi, another imprint especially for graphic Novels. DC Comics has sold its translation rights to Buku Fixi, making it the first Malaysian company to have done so, and the Malay translation of Batman and Superman: Public Enemies, and Supergirl were the first graphic novels published. Later in the same year, the next translation from Grafixi was Suicide Squad: Kicked In The Teeth.

Grafixi was discontinued a year after obtaining the translation rights from DC Comics due to poor sales.

=== FIXI Retro ===
Under Fixi Retro, out-of-print Malay novels with pulp-fiction themes were published. The Late Tan Sri P Ramlee’s Sitora Harimau Jadian was first to be published under this imprint in 2012. It was a novelisation of his 1964 film of the same name, published in 1965. In 2021, Fangora Studios production company announced that the reboot of Sitora Harimau Jadian will be its first film debut.

Sitora Harimau Jadian was followed by Yang Nakal - Nakal, a compilation of 17 shorts stories and eight poetries by the late Datuk Dr. Usman Awang (Malaysian National Laureate 1983) in June 2013. The book was launched in June that year at The Annexe Gallery, Central Market Kuala Lumpur in conjunction with Art For Grabs & The 6th Kuala Lumpur Alternative Book Festival in collaboration with UA Enterprise.

The third book, Hikayat Raja Babi was written by Usop Abdul Kadir who was a merchant travelling from Semarang to Palembang in 1775. Over two centuries later, the book which was written in Arabic script was transliterated to Roman script by Arsyad Mokthar and published in 2015. In 2020, Hikayat Raja Babi was retold by Heidi Shamsuddin and titled The Malay Tale of the Pig King published under Matahari Books. The English retelling was simplified and illustrated by Evi Shelvia.

Perempuan Gusti Samseng Rumah Kosong is a republication of three novels by the late prolific writer, Hamzah Hussin (1927-2007) published in 1950-1960. Perempuan Gusti is about Fatimah who refused to be confined by gender stereotypes. Samseng is about a Malay anti-hero who’s an alcoholic and a bully. Rumah Kosong was influenced by European existential literature. The book was launched in Ilham Gallery in 2015.

The fifth book, Hikayat Nabi Yusuf, was published in 2018. The original manuscript with the title Hikayat Nabi Allah was written by Muhammad Labai in Perlis in 1802. The manuscript owned by John Leyden who probably obtained the manuscript in 1805-1805 before it was obtained by the British Museum, London and kept there since. This book was transliterated from Arabic script to Roman by Arsyad Mokhtar and illustrated by Ariff Rahman Othman. In 2021, Buku Fixi gave permission to Bibliopress to publish the book.

=== FIXI Dwi ===
Fixi Dwi is another imprint from Buku Fixi to publish books with both Romanised and Jawi scripts. The first book, Gothik Puaka Edan by Hasrul Rizwan was published in October 2019, followed by Seloka Anak Rantau (Shaz Johar) and Syawal Tak Boleh Lewat (Syafiq Aizat) both published in February and the latter in July 2020. Syawal Tak Boleh Lewat was the last book for this imprint.

Each title has a limited run of 1,500 copies and are not reprinted. They are sold exclusively by Buku Fixi either at the bookstores, online shopping platforms and events participated by them.

=== FIXI London ===
Fixi London was established in 2016 to publish urban contemporary pulp fiction from Southeast Asia. It made its debut in 2017 with William Tham Wai Liang’s King’s of Petaling Street. He contributed some of his writings in a number of Fixi Novo anthologies. Kings of Petaling Street was nominated for the Penang Monthly Book Prize 2017, organised by Penang Monthly magazine. Later that year, Fixi London published with its second book, a Muslim erotica novel titled Uqasha written by Maria Isabella. Fixi London ceased operation on 8 January 2019.
