= Danny Lim =

Malaysian writer and photographer (born 1975)

Danny Lim (born 7 November 1975 in Malacca, Malaysia) is a Malaysian writer, journalist and photographer.

== Published works ==
His articles and photography have been published in publications like Off the Edge (Malaysia), Malaysiakini, The Nut Graph (Malaysia) and The Sun. His work has also been featured in the Far Eastern Economic Review.

His first book was The Malaysian Book of the Undead (2008, Matahari Books), a light-hearted compendium of Malaysian ghosts and supernatural beings. He also published a second book with Matahari Books, entitled We Are Marching Now: The Inside Story of Bersih 1.0.

He has served as still photographer for a few Malaysian films including The Big Durian and Apa Khabar Orang Kampung.

He also made a short video documentary 18? (2005) which is about political graffiti in Kuala Lumpur.

His photo-essay Aku, Hang & Demo was published in New Malaysian Essays 2 in 2009.
