= Lycée Anna de Noailles =

Lycée Anna de Noailles may refer to:

- Lycée Anna de Noailles (Évian-les-Bains) in Évian-les-Bains, France
- Lycée Français Anna de Noailles, a French international school in Bucharest, Romania
