= Susuk (film) =

- Directed by: Amir Muhammad; Naeim Ghalili
- Written by: Rajesh Nair
- Produced by: Ahmad Puad Onah; Rosihan Zain; Naeim Ghalili
- Starring: Ida Nerina; Adlin Aman Ramlie; Diana Rafar; Sofea Jane; Hairie Othman; Noorkhiriah
- Edited by: Isazaly Mohd Isa
- Music by: Hardesh Singh
- Production companies: Grand Brilliance; Monsoon Pictures
- Release date: 7 August 2008 (Malaysia)
- Running time: 110 minutes
- Country: Malaysia
- Language: Malay
- Box office: MYR 3.7 million

Susuk (English: Implant) is a 2008 Malaysian Malay-language horror film which was released on 7 August 2008 in Malaysia. The film is directed by Amir Muhammad and Naeim Ghalili. The story concerns Soraya, who uses the forbidden practice of susuk to be famous.

== Plot ==
Soraya is a young trainee nurse who is starting to feel disaffected by her life. A chance introduction to the world of glamour piques her earlier ambition to be a star. She does not succeed at first, but she is told that the forbidden practice of susuk can help. She has to make a choice whether to stay the way she is, or cross the line. At first, susuk seems to give her confidence in her performance, and even to stand up to her abusive brother-in-law.

Meanwhile, Suzana is a prominent diva with an air of mystery. She has long been a practitioner of the black arts due to her use of the extreme susuk keramat. Every time she violates a taboo, a human life is required - first in the form of accidental deaths of her loved ones, then by outright murder and cannibalism. She develops inhuman, supernatural abilities. At the same time, she yearns for her more innocent days and hires a young assistant who reminds her of "happier times".

A mysterious and powerful dukun guides the two women down their paths to corruption. The viewers follow the lives of these two women until their stories converge in the true secret of this dreaded charm.

== Cast ==
- Diana Rafar as Soraya
- Ida Nerina as Suzana
- Adlin Aman Ramlie as Dukun Dewangga
- Noorkhiriah as Mastura
- Gambit Saifullah as Kamal
- Sofea Jane as Mona
- Aleeza Kasim as Rozana
- Tengku Marina as Aini
- Anne Abdullah as Sasha
- Hairie Othman as Farish
- Chew Kin Wah as Producer Lee
- Jalaluddin Hassan as Producer Razman
- Baizura Kahar as Idola Marcella
- Liza Othman as Aliya, Soraya's mother
- Wan Hanafi Su as Bomoh Effendi

=== Special appearances ===
- Yasmin Yusoff as Host TV show
- Jaclyn Victor as herself
- Sharifah Aleya as Host a Talent Contest
- David Teo as Elderly Man
- Mazidul Akmal Sidek as TV Readers
- Rafidah Abdullah as PA Concert
- Soffi Jikan as Guitarist
- Yasmin Ahmad as Nurse
- Ramona Rahman as Suzana's Concert Guest
- Susan Lankester as Suzana's Concert Guest
- Tony Eusoff as Suzana's Concert Guest

Scenes involving Jaclyn Victor, Waheeda, David Teo, and Sharifah Aleya however have been cut in the film editing process.

== Production ==
The film is Muhammad's only genre film so far.

== Awards and nominations ==
The film was nominated in nine categories in the 21st Malaysian Film Festival, 2008 and won three of the categories.

Won

- Best Actress Ida Nerina
- Best Poster
- Best Sound Effect - Daniel Tang

Nominated

- Best Film
- Best Costume Designer/Garment - Mohd Zaini
- Most Promising Actress - Diana Rafar
- Best Art Direction - Ting Lam
- Best Original Music Score - Hardesh Singh
- Best Cinematography - Daven R.
- Best Actor - Adlin Aman Ramlie

== Reception ==
Reception of the film was very polarised. The film was, however, a box office success in Malaysia.
