= Saharil Hasrin Sanin =

Saharil Sanin
- Born: Saharil Hasrin bin Sanin; 21 October 1975 (age 50); Pontian, Johor
- Occupation: Writer

Saharil Hasrin Sanin (born 21 October 1975 in Pontian, Johor, Malaysia) is a Malaysian writer, visual artist and blogger. An alumnus of Sekolah Alam Shah in Cheras, he studied Industrial Engineering at the University of Cardiff and graduated in 1998.

== Published works ==
His first short story was published in Dewan Siswa magazine in 1991, when he was in Form Four. Many of his short stories and articles have since been published in Malaysian Malay publications, including those by Dewan Bahasa dan Pustaka. They have also won numerous awards.

His first two novels Luka Seribu Hati and Fashionista! were serialised in Wanita and EH! magazines respectively in 2006 and 2007. Several short stories were also in the book Lagi Cerpen-Cerpen Underground (2002) which were together with stories by Faisal Tehrani. His 54-page essay Teroris Bahasa was included in New Malaysian Essays 1 (Matahari Books, 2008).

== Blog ==
His blog has received the "Blog Terhebat dan Terbaik" award from "Anugerah Geng Jurnal" in 2007. It is updated daily (except Saturdays and Sundays) with a drawing, very short story, photograph, or illustrated anecdote.

== Artwork ==
His faux-naïf artwork are marked by elements of parody and black humour. They can be seen in his blog, but a series was also sold at The Annexe Gallery in Kuala Lumpur in 2008, where it sold out on the first day.
