= The Big Durian =

The Big Durian is a nickname given to more than one place:

- Esplanade – Theatres on the Bay, Singapore, which has two large ovoid buildings that resemble durians
- The official nickname of Jakarta, the capital of Indonesia
- The Big Durian (film)
- The Big Durian (sculpture), a sculpture located at the centre of the roundabout in Kampot, Cambodia

== See also ==
- Durian
