= Naeim Ghalili =

Iranian actor and filmmaker (born 1962)

- Born: 1962 (age 63–64); Esfahan, Iran
- Occupations: Actor, filmmaker

Naeim Ghalili (born 1962 in Esfahan, Iran) is an Iranian actor and filmmaker. After migration to several countries, he settled in Kuala Lumpur Malaysia and currently works in the motion picture industry.

== Biography ==
He is known for directing the feature film Susuk, with co-director Amir Muhammad. His latest work was as a streaming episodic series SALON, distributed by VIU.

His prior role as executive producer at TIGERTIGER POST Sdn Bhd, led him to start KL POST Sdn Bhd., a media post production house in Kuala Lumpur. Ghalili has completed several feature films as a post producer. The latest being SANGKAR released in 2019. He is also the Managing Director of Monsoon Pictures Sdn Bhd, which produced the movies Salon and a TV series by the same name in 2018. However Salon the OTT series, has nothing to do with the 2005 feature film of the same title.

Ghalili has also been cast as an actor in Internationally released films such as, Don starring Shah Rukh Khan and The Apocalypse Code starring Anastasia Zavorotnyuk. He was recently cast as an Indonesian Cornel in the 7th season on the TV series Strike Back produced by Left Bank Pictures.
