= Low Ngai Yuen =

Malaysian film director, producer, actress and TV show host

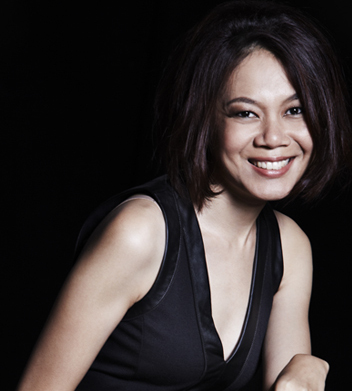
- Born: 1976 or 1977 (age 48–49); Kuala Lumpur, Malaysia
- Education: Bachelor of Science
- Alma mater: Campbell University
- Occupations: Film director, producer
- Years active: 2000 - present
- Known for: Kakiseni, 3R (Malaysian TV series), WOMEN:Girls, Global Entrepreneurship Movement (GEM).
- Notable work: Your World, My World (2003)
- Television: 3R (Malaysian TV series)
- Title: President of Kakiseni
- Spouse: Wayne Wong
- Children: 4

Low Ngai Yuen (劉藝苑, born 1976 or 1977) is a Malaysian film director, producer, actress and TV show host. She is also a women's rights activist and an entrepreneur in the arts industry. She directed the production of short films and documentaries that advocate women's rights. Low is the current President of Kakiseni, an NGO platform for the performing arts in Malaysia.

== Life ==
Low resides in Kuala Lumpur, Malaysia with her husband Wayne Wong and four children. She is involved in two main causes: women empowerment and the performing arts. Low is also active in youth inclusion and productivity as well as social issues. As a working mother, she believes that balance between family life and career starts each day with her children. She received a Bachelor of Science in biology and chemistry from Campbell University, North Carolina in June 2000. In early 2004, she completed a course on filmmaking at the University of Melbourne, Australia to help improve her skills in filmmaking.

== Career ==
Low currently leads three NGO: Global Entrepreneurship Movement (GEM), Kakiseni and WOMEN:girls. She is also co-founder of four business service companies.

In 2000, Low started hosting a talkshow named 3R, a women's program on TV3. She gives credit to her experience at 3R for understanding the media industry and discovering new opportunities. In addition to her TV activities and hosting events, Low directed the TV programs Satelit and Generasi for Astro Ria, a Malaysian 24-hour TV network; and Growing Pains for RTM2, a free-to-air television channel operated by the Radio Television Malaysia.

In 2002, Low's talkshow 3R won the best infotainment programme award at the Asian Television Awards. Her directorial debut, Your World, My World (2003) won the Best Short Film and The People's Choice awards at the Starlight Cinema Short Film Festival 2003 in Singapore and the Évian Short Film Festival. Your World, My World was selected for screening at the 8th Manchester International Short Film & Video Festival in 2003 and the 7th Toronto Reel Asian International Film Festival, an annual festival devoted to cinematic works from East and Southeast Asia, Asian-Canadian and Asian-American filmmakers.

Trio Indonesia, an interactive TV series, was Low's first project as a Director outside of Malaysia. She also wrote and directed a play titled The Girl from Ipoh, a comedy staged in 2005. Low also created and directed 5 Jingga, a series of TV musical drama about youth issues on 8TV that started on 12 August 2008.

In 2008, Low joined the French multinational retailer Carrefour Malaysia and Singapore as its youngest Director of marketing and communications. She worked at this company until January 2012.

In 2011, Low was selected as a Subject Matter Expert for the Malaysian Prime Minister's roundtable on engaging the youth. She then acted as the leader of its performing arts pillar that maps the industry's growth for the Dasar Industri Kreatif Negara.

In 2013, Low won in the media and arts category, the Malaysia's Women Weekly Great Women of Our Time award for her initiative WOMEN:girls, a program she created 2011 to match younger girls with accomplished women as inspiration and role models. Then, she was named Most Successful Woman of 2014 by Jessica Malaysia magazine. From 2015 to 2017, Low was a member of the board of the National Advisory Council on the Integration of Women in Development set up by the Ministry of Women, Family and Community Development (Malaysia).

== Filmography ==
Low has an extensive career in the film industry with many films in all genres to her credit. For example, her “WOMEN:girls” program launched a storytelling movement, “Ikal Mayang” in 2013 where short films are used to engage conversations within communities. The goal of this movement is to empower women, increase the share of their voices, and tell their stories through filmmaking. In conjunction with International Women's Day, Ikal Mayang created its own film festival that showcases female film directors from Asia. The movement achieved an important milestone when it was officially selected for the 18th Busan International Film Festival (BIFF) 2013. Under Low's leadership, Ikal Mayang contributed these short stories that premiered at BIFF 2013: Jerat Suami directed by Dira Abu Zahar, 1-800-BABY directed by Datin Sofia Jane Hisham, Pantang directed by Vanidah Imran, Odah directed by Junaidah M. Nor, Berat Sebelah directed by Melissa Saila, and She directed by Ida Nerina.

Year	Title	Genre	Role
2003	Your World, My World	Drama (Mandarin)	Director and writer
2003	The Big Durian	Documentary/Drama (English/Malay)	Actress
2004	Visits: Hungry Ghost Anthology (segment "1413")	Horror (Mandarin)	Director/writer (segment)
2004	Wind Chimes	Drama (English)	Actress
2004	Ah Lok Kafe: The Movie	Comedy (English)	Actress
2006	Trio & a Bed	Drama (English)	Director
2008	5 Jingga	Drama (Malay)	Director
2008	High Times (Kasut Tumit Tinggi)	Drama (Malay)	Director
2010	Geng Bas Sekolah	Drama (Malay)	Director
2014	Cuak	Comedy/Drama (English/Mandarin)	Executive producer
2014	Chicken	Drama/Family (Mandarin/Chinese)	Executive producer
2018	The Outsider	Drama (Mandarin/Malay/English)	Director and writer
