= Durian (disambiguation) =

Durian is a large odorous spike-covered fruit of several southeast Asian tree species belonging to the genus Durio.

Durian may refer to:

- Durian Durian, 2000 Hong Kong film directed by Fruit Chan
- Durian Tunggal, small town in Melaka state Malaysia
- Ohan Durian (1922–2011), Armenian conductor
- The Big Durian (disambiguation)
- Typhoon Durian, intense storm that wreaked havoc in the Philippines in 2006
- Sintel (code named "Project Durian"), a 2010 open content short film by the Blender Foundation
