= Yves Brunier (landscape architect) =

French landscape architect

- Born: 10 November 1962; Évian-les-Bains, France
- Died: 2 October 1991 (aged 28); Évian-les-Bains, France
- Occupation: Landscape architect
- Notable work: Museumpark

Yves Brunier (10 November 1962 – 2 October 1991) was a French landscape architect best known for his collage illustrations and projects done in France and Belgium.

== Education ==
Brunier was born on 10 November 1962 in Évian-les-Bains, France. He studied architecture in Grenoble, graduating in 1982, and received a diploma in landscape architecture from the Versailles-based École nationale supérieure du paysage in 1986.

== Career ==
Brunier began what Udo Weilacher described as a "meteoric career" in 1986. He worked at the Office for Metropolitan Architecture (OMA) as Rem Koolhaas' assistant, mostly on projects in Rotterdam, Amsterdam and The Hague. He initially refused to design landscapes, wishing to be an architect instead, but was persuaded by Koolhaas. Their projects include the Museumpark in Rotterdam, Villa dall'Ava in Saint-Cloud, and the unrealized Euralille project. After working at OMA, Brunier went to Paris to resume architecture studies. By then, it was visible that he had AIDS. Upon his return to OMA, Brunier was convinced by Koolhaas to abandon architecture and focus on landscape architecture.

In 1987, he became a projects assistant to Jean Nouvel in Paris, with whom he worked on the gardens of the Hotel St. James in Bouliac and the Hotel des Thermes in Dax, and the Place du Général Leclerc in Tours. From 1988, he collaborated with Isabelle Auricoste. During his five year long career as a landscape architect, Brunier completed 15 projects.

Brunier exploited the clash between culture and nature rather than seeking to create harmonious images of nature in the city. His favorite technique was collage; he created unconventional compositions by fusing fragments of different images, ideas or situations. He also used pencil and watercolor sketches. According to Koolhaas, Brunier's drawings and collages were regularly characterized by impatience and violence. Koolhaas also claimed that Brunier's approach to nature was aggressive, and attributed this to his illness. Nevertheless, Brunier paid a lot of attention to the choice of plants in his projects.

Brunier died aged 28 of an AIDS-related illness in his hometown on 2 October 1991.
