= Apa Khabar Orang Kampung =

- Poster for Apa Khabar Orang Kampung
- Directed by: Amir Muhammad
- Produced by: Tan Chui Mui; James Lee
- Cinematography: Albert Hue
- Edited by: Akashdeep Singh
- Music by: Hardesh Singh
- Production company: Da Huang Pictures
- Distributed by: Red Films
- Release date: February 2007 (Berlin)
- Running time: 72 minutes
- Country: Malaysia
- Languages: Malay; Thai

Apa Khabar Orang Kampung (English title:Village People Radio Show) is a 2007 Malaysian documentary by Amir Muhammad. It was produced by Da Huang Pictures. Like its predecessor The Last Communist, it was banned in its home country but screened in several international film festivals. It premiered at the Berlinale in 2006.

The title (Malay: "How are the villagers doing?") is a reference to a famous song by Sudirman Arshad of the same name that is used in both the opening and closing credits.

== Plot ==
The precise role of the Communist Party of Malaya (CPM) in Malaysian history is still a controversial and hotly contested one. It was a player in the anti-colonial struggle against occupying Japanese forces (1942–1945) and later the returning British administration (1945–1957). However, its continual commitment to armed struggle in the post-Independence era depleted much public support.

In the propaganda war, the government made much of the fact that the CPM comprised mainly ethnic Chinese members and adopted an 'atheistic' political philosophy. As the nation is mainly Malay-Muslim, these were effective scare tactics in dissuading the population from having any sympathy towards the communists.

However, a large and influential division of the CPM, the 10th Regiment, comprised Malay-Muslim members. Many of its leaders such as Abdullah CD, Rashid Maidin, Abu Samah, Shamsiah Fakeh, Kamaruzzaman Teh and Suriani Abdullah were iconic figures of rebellion and resistance. These men and women had no trouble reconciling radical left ideology with Islamic faith.

The 10th Regiment began a strategic retreat across the border into South Thailand in the mid-1950s. Many of the members would not see their home villages again for five decades.

From secret jungle hide-outs, they conducting guerrilla warfare against the armed forces of the day. When the government of China began diplomatic relations with Malaysia in the early 1980s, aid from Beijing stopped and life became more difficult. A formal ceasefire was signed in 1989.

This documentary takes a look at the present-day lives of the 10th Regiment figures who are still living in a village in South Thailand. (Others had either died or opted to return to Malaysia). They earn a living by farming and are no longer engaged in politics.

Almost everyone in the village is either above the age of 60 or below 15. This is because the middle generation often had to be sent out for adoption as children would have been inconvenient in secret guerrilla hideouts.

Through interviews with the elders, we hear of how life in the jungle was like: the food, the battles, the acupuncture. But the narrative keeps breaking up. There are audio and visual disruptions. History refuses to be contained or told so neatly.

In the background, a Thai radio soap opera is heard. It tells the story of a king who suspects his pregnant wife of adultery, and so jails her.

== Reception and analysis ==
Nominated at the Asian Pacific Screen Awards, the film discusses the life of Malaysian political exiles. Variety found that it was a less successful production than The Last Communist.
