= 29th G8 summit =

2003 international leader meeting in France

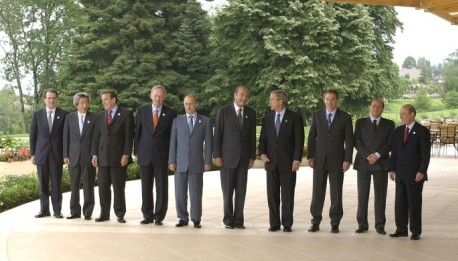
- Host country: France
- Date: 1–3 June 2003
- Cities: Évian-les-Bains
- Venues: Hôtel Royal
- Follows: 28th G8 summit
- Precedes: 30th G8 summit

The 29th G8 summit was held in Évian-les-Bains, France, on 1–3 June 2003. As is usual for G8 summits, there were a range of protests.

== Overview ==
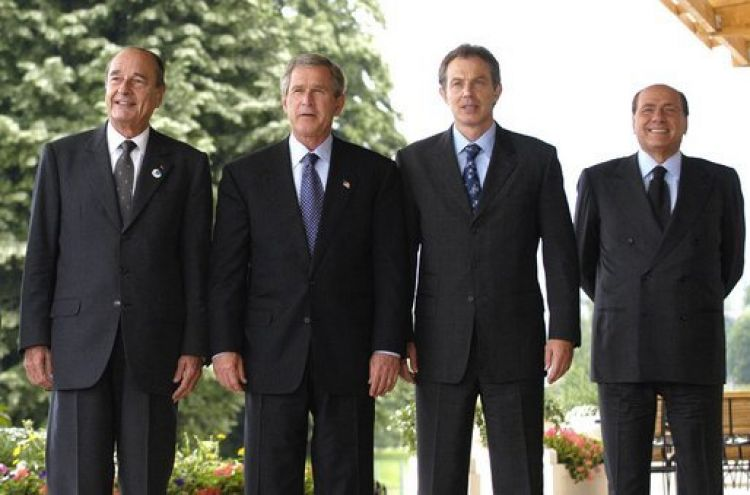
Jacques Chirac, George W. Bush, Tony Blair, and Silvio Berlusconi during the G8 summit

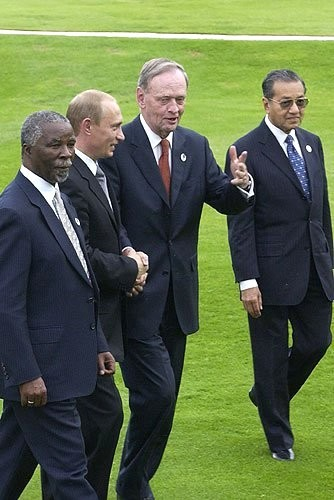
Mahathir Mohamad, Jean Chrétien, Vladimir Putin, and Thabo Mbeki during the G8 summit

The Group of Seven (G7) was an unofficial forum which brought together the heads of the richest industrialized countries: France, Germany, Italy, Japan, the United Kingdom, the United States, and Canada starting in 1976. The G8, meeting for the first time in 1997, was formed with the addition of Russia. In addition, the President of the European Commission has been formally included in summits since 1981. The summits were not meant to be linked formally with wider international institutions; and in fact, a mild rebellion against the stiff formality of other international meetings was a part of the genesis of cooperation between France's president Valéry Giscard d'Estaing and West Germany's chancellor Helmut Schmidt as they conceived the initial summit of the Group of Six (G6) in 1975.

The G8 summits during the twenty-first century have inspired widespread debates, protests and demonstrations; and the two- or three-day event becomes more than the sum of its parts, elevating the participants, the issues and the venue as focal points for activist pressure.

Official G8 Summit magazines which have been published under the auspices of the host nations for distribution to all attendees since 1998; the 2008 edition was published by Prestige Media.

== Leaders at the summit ==
The G8 is an unofficial annual forum for the leaders of Canada, the European Commission, France, Germany, Italy, Japan, Russia, the United Kingdom, and the United States.

The 29th G8 summit was the last summit for Canadian Prime Minister Jean Chrétien and Malaysian Prime Minister Mahathir Mohamad.

=== Participants ===
These summit participants are the current "core members" of the international forum:

**Core G8 members** Host state and leader are shown in bold text.
| Member | | Represented by | Title |
| (Canada) | Canada | Jean Chrétien | Prime Minister |
| (France) | **France** | **Jacques Chirac** | **President** |
| (Germany) | Germany | Gerhard Schröder | Chancellor |
| (Italy) | Italy | Silvio Berlusconi | Prime Minister |
| (Japan) | Japan | Junichiro Koizumi | Prime Minister |
| (Russia) | Russia | Vladimir Putin | President |
| (United Kingdom) | United Kingdom | Tony Blair | Prime Minister |
| (United States) | United States | George W. Bush | President |
| (European Union) | European Union | Romano Prodi | Commission President |
| (European Union) | European Union | Costas Simitis | Council President |
**Guest Invitees (Countries)**
| Member | | Represented by | Title |
| (Algeria) | Algeria | Abdelaziz Bouteflika | President |
| (Brazil) | Brazil | Luiz Inácio Lula da Silva | President |
| (China) | China | Hu Jintao | General Secretary; President |
| (Egypt) | Egypt | Hosni Mubarak | President |
| (Greece) | Greece | Costas Simitis | Prime Minister |
| (India) | India | Atal Bihari Vajpayee | Prime Minister |
| (Malaysia) | Malaysia | Mahathir Mohamad | Prime Minister |
| (Mexico) | Mexico | Vicente Fox | President |
| (Nigeria) | Nigeria | Olusegun Obasanjo | President |
| (Saudi Arabia) | Saudi Arabia | Abdullah | Regent |
| (Senegal) | Senegal | Abdoulaye Wade | President |
| (South Africa) | South Africa | Thabo Mbeki | President |
| (Switzerland) | Switzerland | Pascal Couchepin | President |
**Guest Invitees (International Institutions)**
| Member | | Represented by | Title |
| | International Monetary Fund | Horst Köhler | managing director |
| (United Nations) | United Nations | Kofi Annan | Secretary-General |
| | World Bank | James Wolfensohn | President |
| | World Trade Organization | Supachai Panitchpakdi | Director-General |

== Priorities ==
Traditionally, the host country of the G8 summit sets the agenda for negotiations, which take place primarily amongst multi-national civil servants in the weeks before the summit itself, leading to a joint declaration which all countries can agree to sign.

Reconciliation amongst the G8 leaders was the top priority in the wake of the beginning of the Iraq War. The G8 had sharply divided over the American-led invasion. Chirac's broad agenda was organized under four main themes — solidarity, responsibility, security, and democracy.

== Issues ==
The summit was intended as a venue for resolving differences among its members. As a practical matter, the summit was also conceived as an opportunity for its members to give each other mutual encouragement in the face of difficult economic decisions.

== Aubonne bridge ==
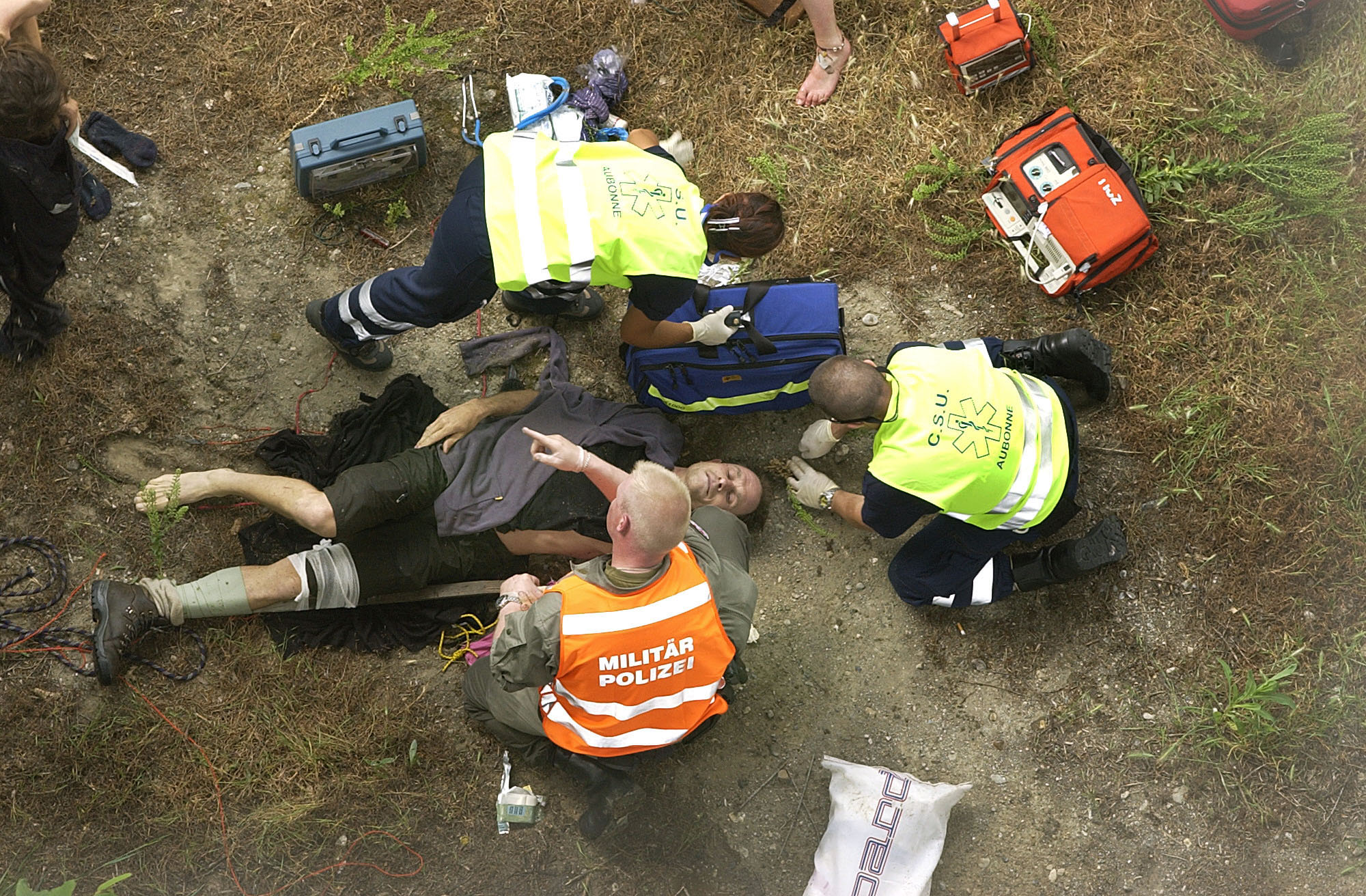
Martin Shaw after his fall from the Aubonne bridge

During the protests, some manifestations went out of order as Swiss towns have been sacked by rioters. An accident also occurred during protest at the Aubonne bridge in Switzerland between Lausanne and Geneva, in which two activists suspended themselves from the bridge via a rope, with the rope stretching across the bridge, displaying a banner and obstructing traffic on the highway with one of the highest traffic density of Switzerland. Some protestors were arrested. One of the policemen, unaware people were attached to the rope, cut it. As a result, one of the protestors, Briton Martin Shaw, plunged 20m down into a rocky river and suffered multiple fractures. The other activist, German Gesine Wenzel, was caught by other protestors and could later abseil safely. In a ruling on 17 February 2006 a judge acquitted the two police officers found responsible on the grounds that their actions had been based on "a series of unfortunate misunderstandings" and therefore were not criminal. Indeed the anti-G8 manifestations were difficult to handle by their scales and by the seriousness of the disorders. Many policemen (including the one who cut the rope) came from the German speaking part of Switzerland. The linguistic barriers, added to the stress of the situation (a blocked highway that could have resulted in many deaths) were considered by the court as critical in the misunderstandings that generated the accident.

== Gallery of participating leaders ==
=== Core G8 participants ===
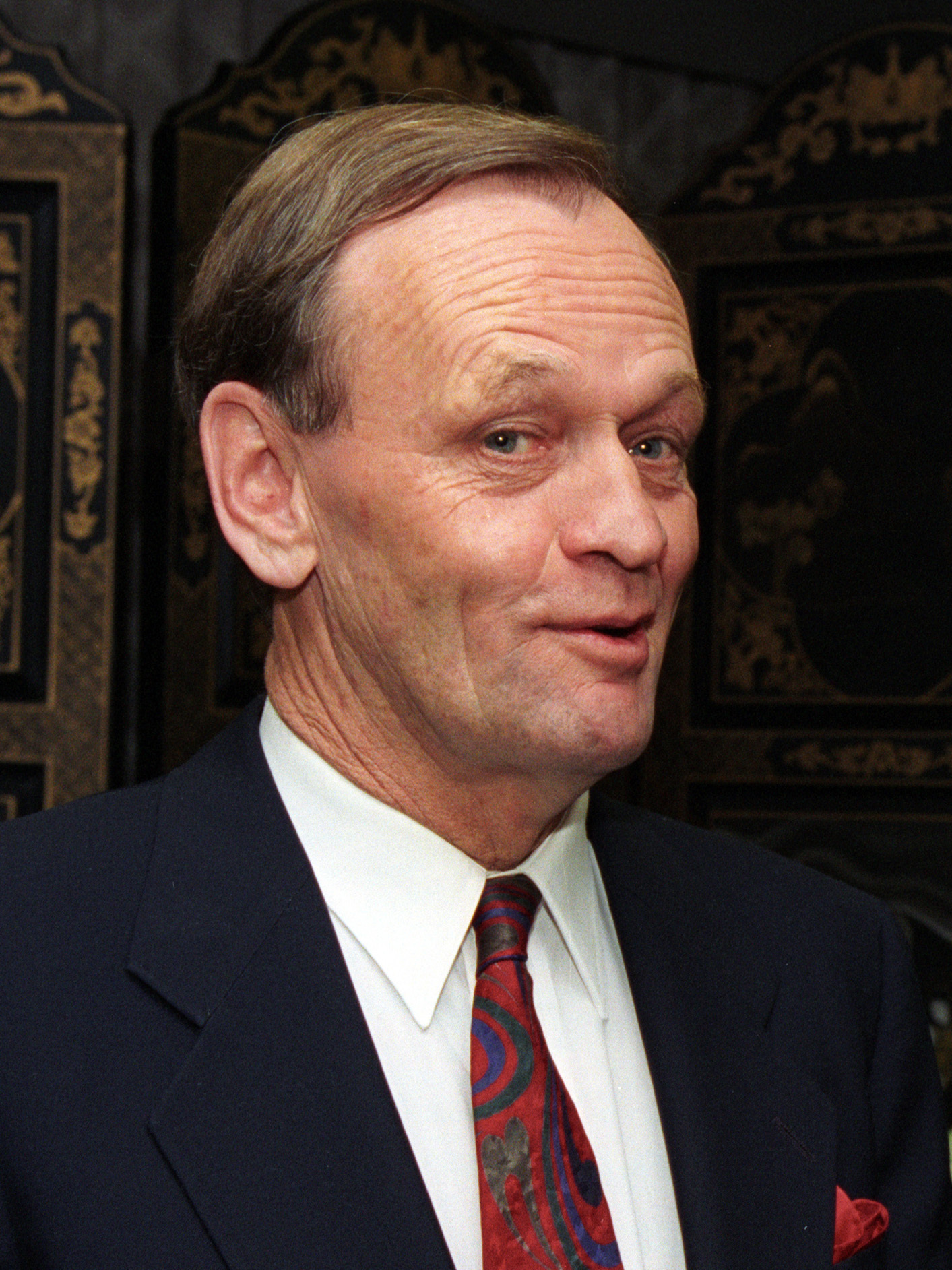
(Canada) Canada
Jean Chrétien,
Prime Minister

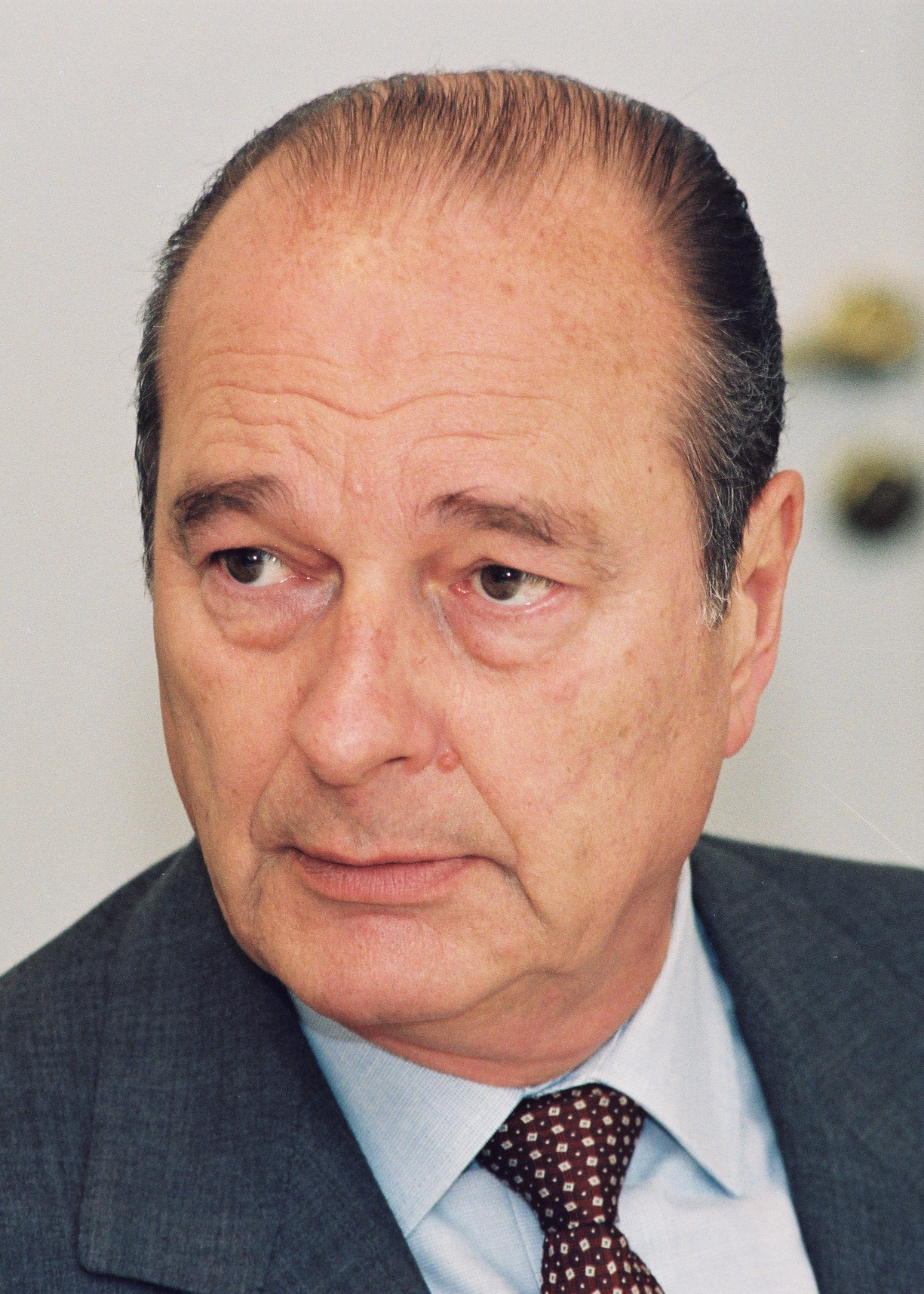
(France) France
Jacques Chirac,
President (Host)

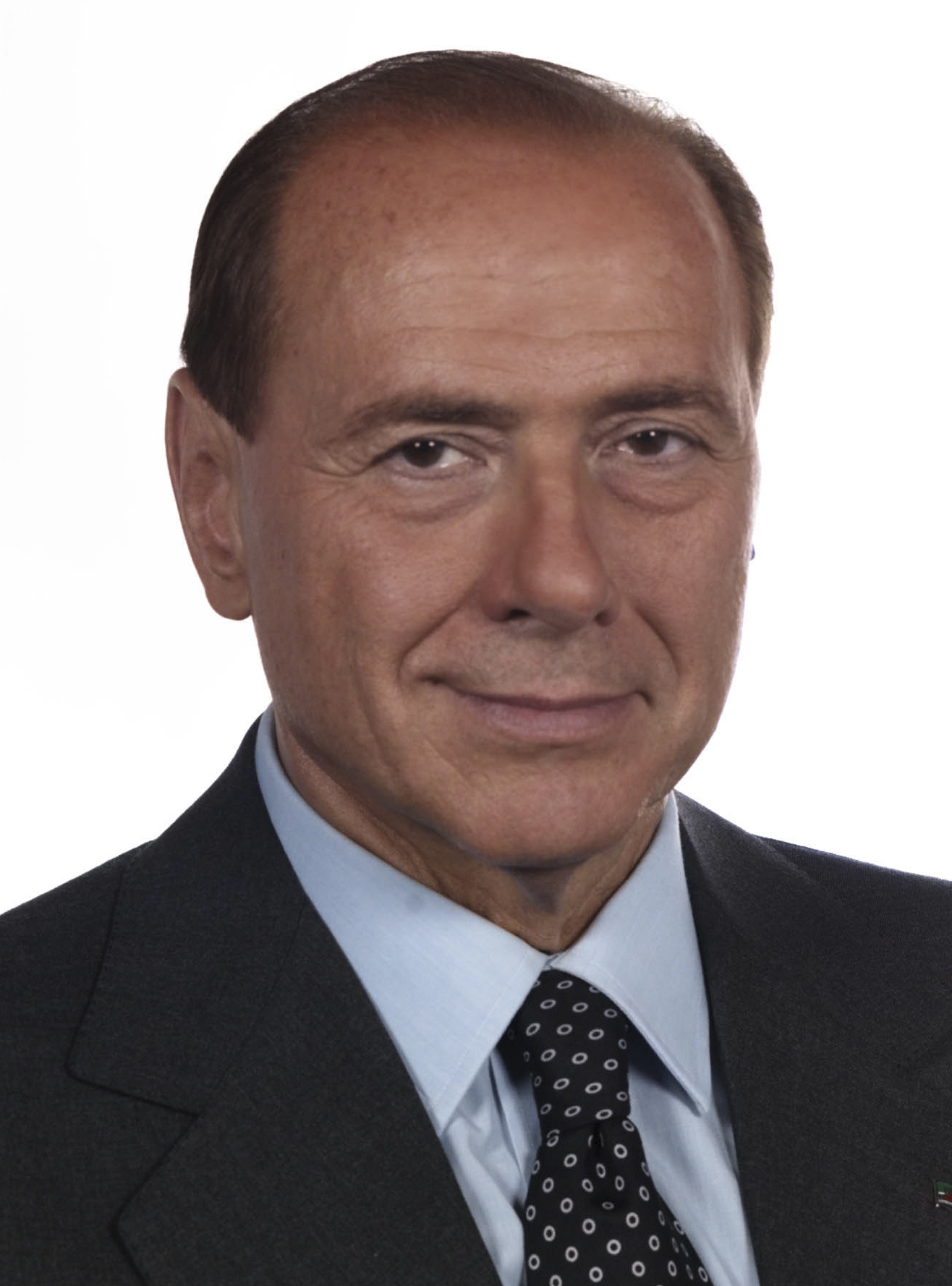
(Italy) Italy
Silvio Berlusconi,
Prime Minister

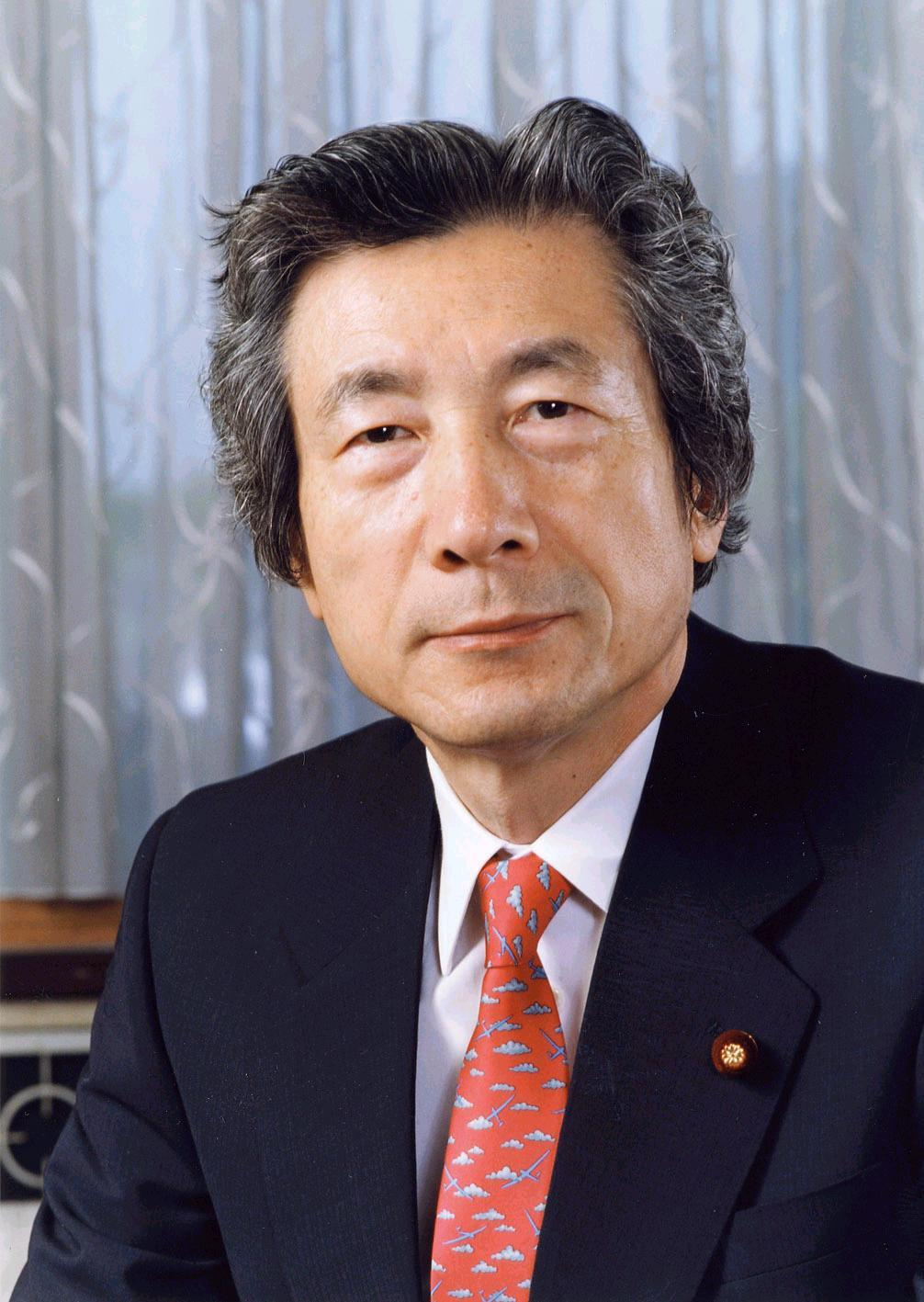
(Japan) Japan
Junichirō Koizumi,
Prime Minister

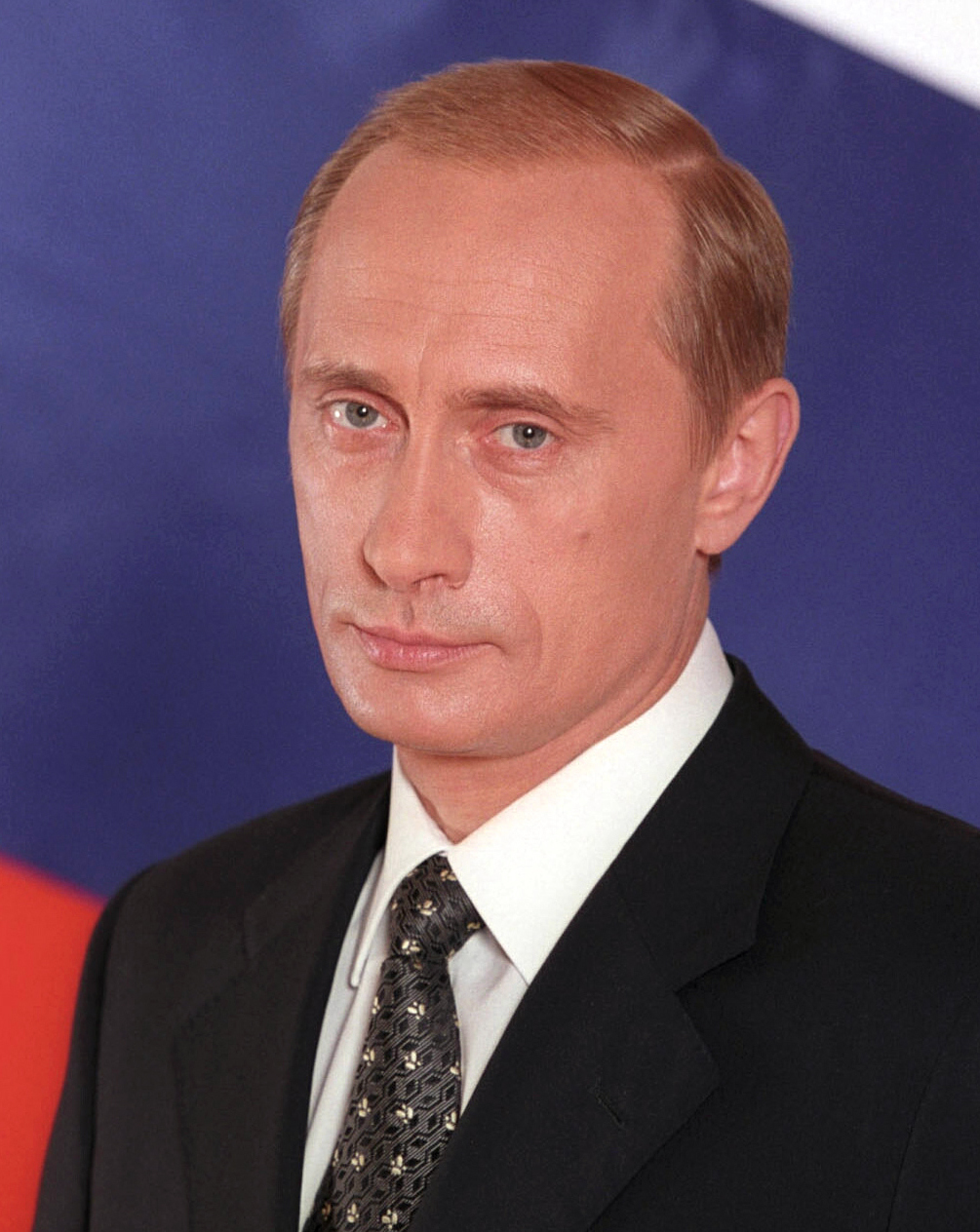
(Russia) Russia
Vladimir Putin,
President

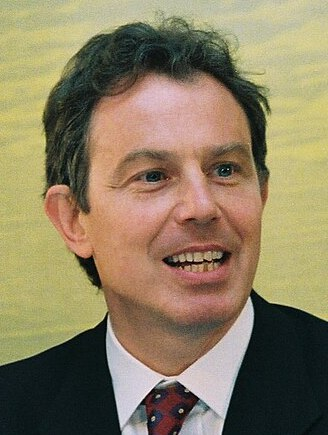
(United Kingdom) United Kingdom
Tony Blair,
Prime Minister

(United States) United States
George W. Bush,
President
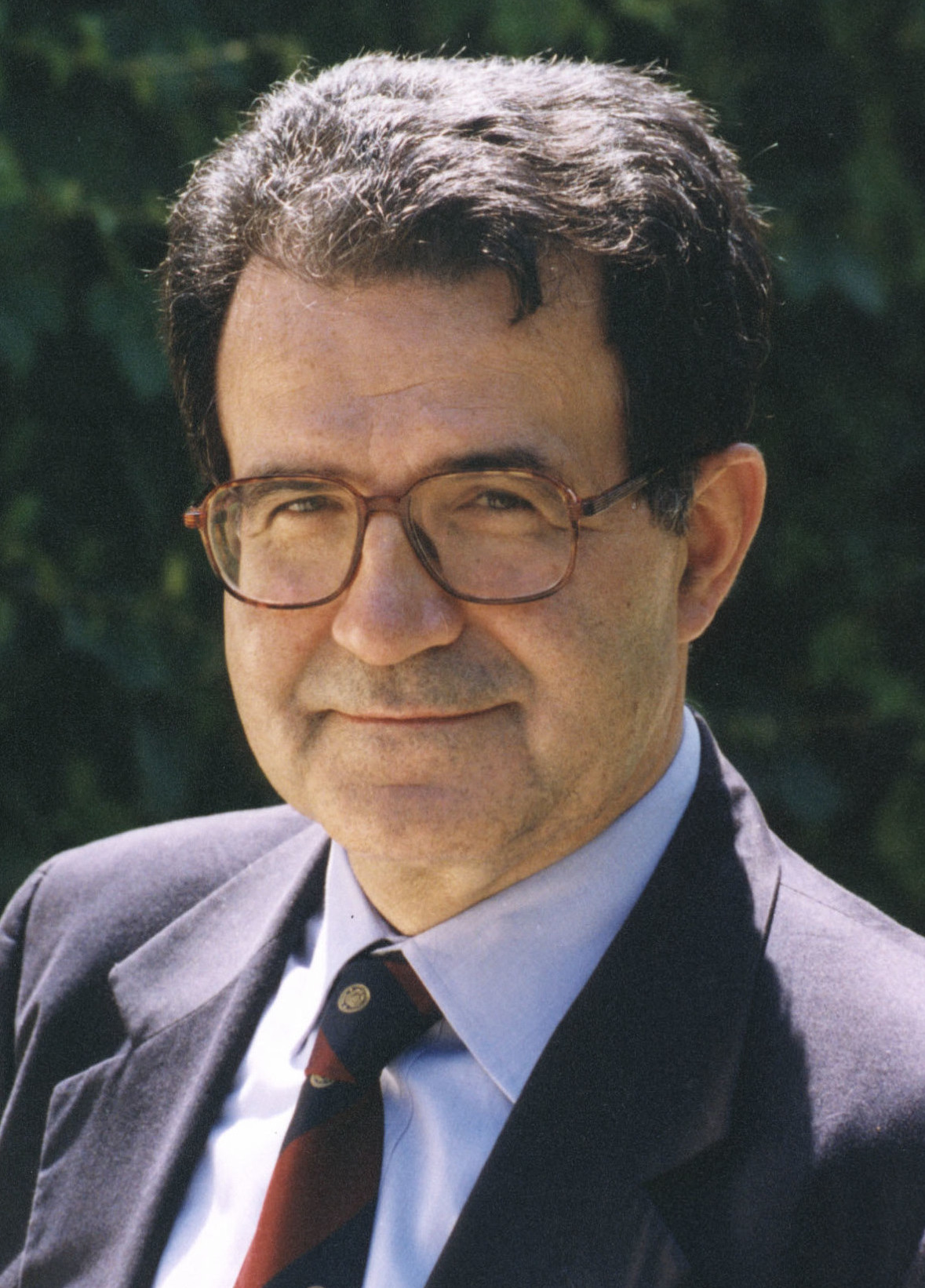
(European Union) European Union
Romano Prodi,
Commission President

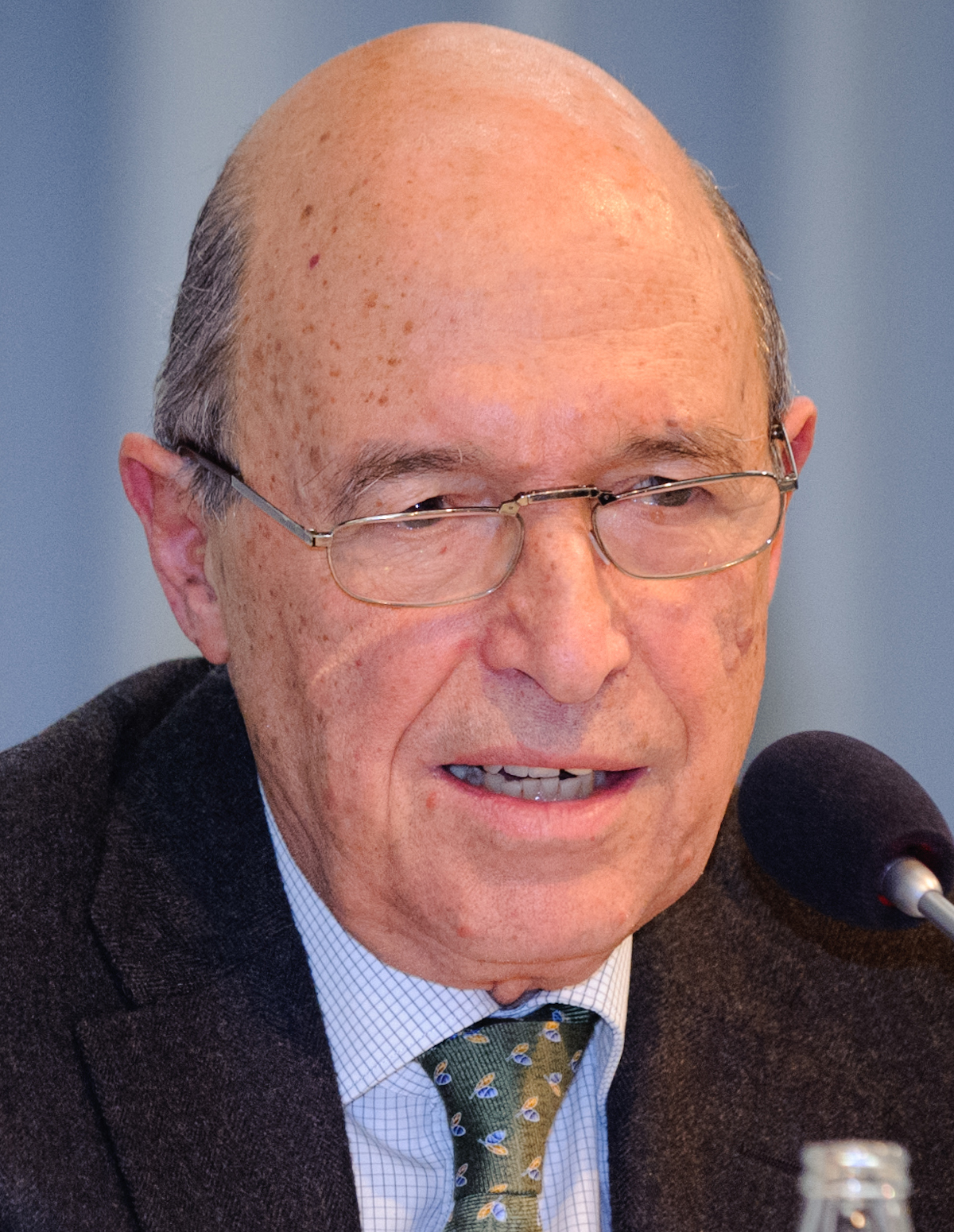
Costas Simitis,
Prime Minister of Greece and rotating Council President
