= The Big Durian (film) =

- Directed by: Amir Muhammad
- Produced by: James Lee; Sylvia Tan
- Cinematography: Woo Ming Jin
- Edited by: Terence Raj
- Music by: Hardesh Singh
- Release date: 2003
- Running time: 74 minutes
- Country: Malaysia
- Languages: English; Malay

The Big Durian is a 2003 Malaysian film by Amir Muhammad that combined documentary with fiction. It made history by being the first (and only) Malaysian film to screen at the Sundance Film Festival.

== Synopsis ==
On the night of 18 October 1987, a soldier, Prebet Adam ran amok with an M16 in the area of Chow Kit, Kuala Lumpur. Due to the thorny circumstances of the time and place, his amok triggered a citywide panic and rumours of racial riots.

== Cast ==
The Big Durian features 23 people: some are actors, while others express their personal opinions. The first group includes Patrick Teoh, Low Ngai Yuen, Jo Kukathas and Rashid Salleh; while the latter include Farish A. Noor, Nam Ron, Anne James and Chacko Vadaketh.

== Release ==
The Big Durian screened in over 30 film festivals, including the Singapore International Film Festival and Yamagata International Documentary Film Festival in 2003 (the former being a world premiere), and the Sundance Film Festival, the Hong Kong International Film Festival and the Vancouver International Film Festival in the following year.

== Critical response ==
Variety magazine said: "Ambitious, sleek-looking docu examines wide array of ethnic, religious and political divisions in modern Malaysia." The Village Voice said that it is an "impertinent love-letter to the citizens of Kuala Lumpur that does not let them off the hook for their apathy."

== See also ==
- Operation Lalang - Prebet Adam amok incident
