= Johann Durand =

French football player (born 1981)

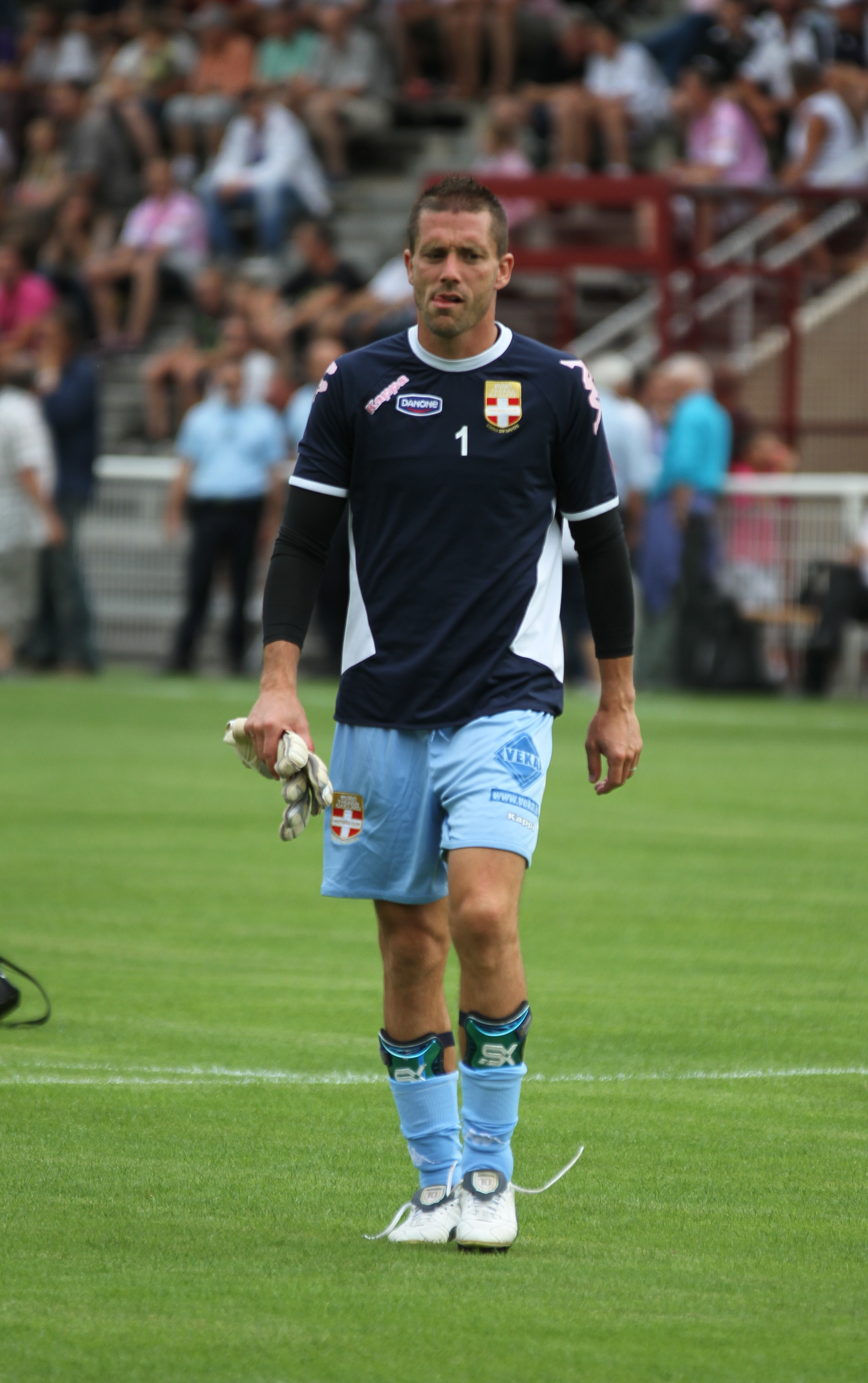

Personal information
- Full name: Johann Durand
- Date of birth: 17 June 1981 (age 45)
- Place of birth: Évian-les-Bains, France
- Height: 1.82 m (6 ft 0 in)
- Position: Goalkeeper

Youth career
- 1997–2000: Servette
- 2000–2002: Evian

Senior career*
Years	Team	Apps	(Gls)
2002–2016	Evian	205	(0)
Total		205	(0)
- * Club domestic league appearances and goals

Johann Durand (born 17 June 1981) is a French former football player who plays as a goalkeeper.

He began his career with Swiss club Servette and joined Evian in 2000 when the club was known as FC Gaillard. Durand is the club's all-time leader in appearances having made over 200 since Gaillard merged with FC Ville-la-Grand in 2003 to form the current club.
