= Farish A. Noor =

Malaysian political scientist and historian

- فارس احمد نور
- Born: Farish Ahmad Noor; 15 May 1967 (age 59); Georgetown, Penang, Malaysia
- Other name: Badrol Hisham
- Education: St. John's Institution; La Salle Secondary School, Kota Kinabalu
- Alma mater: University of Sussex (BA) (MA); School of Oriental and African Studies (MA); University of Essex (PhD)
- Occupation: Professor
- Notable work: Islam on the Move

Farish A. Noor (Jawi: فارسه احمد نور, Malay pronunciation: [farish]; born 15 May 1967) also known as Badrol Hisham Ahmad Noor is a Malaysian academician, historian, and political scientist who is a professor of Politics and Political Science at the Faculty of Social Sciences, International Islamic University of Indonesia.

== Early life and education ==
Farish was born in Georgetown, Penang. He received his BA in Philosophy & Literature from the University of Sussex in 1989, before studying for an MA in Philosophy at the same university in 1990, an MA in South-East Asian Studies at the School of Oriental and African Studies in London, before completing his PhD at the University of Essex in 1997 in the field of governance and politics.

== Career ==
He was formerly attached to the Zentrum Moderner Orient (Centre for Modern Oriental Studies) in Berlin, Germany, and the International Institute for the Study of the Muslim World, Leiden, Netherlands; and then the S. Rajaratnam School of International Studies, Nanyang Technological University Singapore. He was also visiting academic at several European colleges and universities including Sciences-Po Paris and the Institute for the Study of Muslim Society (Ecole des haute études en sciences sociale), Paris. He recently served as a professor at the Department of History, Faculty of Arts and Social Sciences, University of Malaya.

His main area of research has been Southeast Asia in the 19th century, focusing on the discursive aspects of colonial rule and the production of Orientalist writings on the region. Over the past ten years he has also been researching the phenomenon of transnational religio-political movements, as well as the development of religio-politics in South and Southeast Asia, looking at the rise of Muslim, Christian and Hindu political-religious revivalism in particular (see "Islam" in Richter & Mar 2004).

His other interests include antiques and material history, and he has written about the plastic arts of Southeast Asia, focusing on things such as the Indonesian-Malaysian keris to the development of woodcarving and architecture.

Farish has also written and hosted several documentary series on Channel NewsAsia including 'Our Southeast Asia', 'Inside Indonesia with Dr Farish', 'Across Borders' and 'Inventing Southeast Asia'.

== Publications ==
- The Legacy of Colonial Era Postcards from British Malaya to the Present: The Visuals of Empire (Leiden University Press, Leiden, 2025)
- The Long Shadow of the 19th Century: Critical Essays on Colonial Orientalism in Southeast Asia. (Matahari Press, Kuala Lumpur, 2022)
- Racial Difference and the Colonial Wars of 19th Century Southeast Asia. (jointly edited with Peter Carey. Amsterdam University Press, 2021)
- Data Gathering in Colonial Southeast Asia: Framing the Other. (Amsterdam University Press, Amsterdam, 2020)
- America's Encounters with Southeast Asia 1800-1900: Before the Pivot. (Amsterdam University Press, Amsterdam, 2018)
- The Discursive Construction of Southeast Asia in 19th Century Colonial-Capitalist Discourse. (Amsterdam University Press, Amsterdam, 2016)
- The Malaysian Islamic Party 1951-2013: Islamism in a Mottled Nation. (Amsterdam University Press, Amsterdam, 2014)
- From Indrapura to Darul Makmur: A Deconstructive History of Pahang. (Silverfish Books, Kuala Lumpur, 2010.)
- What Your Teacher Didn't Tell You (The Annexe Lectures, Vol. 1) (Matahari Books, Petaling Jaya, 2009)
- Quran and Cricket: Travels Through the Madrasahs of Asia and Other Stories. (Silverfish Books, Kuala Lumpur, 2009)
- A. Noor, Martin van Bruinessen and Yoginder Sikand (Eds.), The Madrasa in Asia: Political Activism and Transnational Linkages. Manohar Press, New Delhi, India, 2009.
- The Madrasah in Asia: Political Activism and Transnational Linkages (University of Amsterdam press, 2008)
- Writings on the War on Terror, Global Media Publications, New Delhi, 2006.
- Crosscurrents: Alternative Voices in Our Changing Times. Marshall Cavendish-Malaysia, Kuala Lumpur, 2006.
- Islam Embedded: The Historical Development of the Pan-Malaysian Islamic Party PAS 1951-2003 (MSRI, Kuala Lumpur, 2004)
- Di San Zhi Yan Kan Ma Lai Xi Ya (Chinese edition of The Other Malaysia). Sin Chew Jit Poh Press, Petaling Jaya, Selangor, 2004.
- A. Noor and Eddin Khoo, Spirit of Wood: The Art of Malay Woodcarving. Works of Master Craftsmen from Kelantan, Trengganu and Patani. Periplus publishers, Singapore. 2003.
- The Other Malaysia: Writings on Malaysia's Subaltern History, Silverfish Books, Kuala Lumpur, 2002
- Terrorising the Truth, The Shaping of Contemporary Images of Islam and Muslims in Media, Politics and Culture (JUST world press, Kuala Lumpur, 1998)
