= Felicia Yap =

Malaysian author

Felicia Yap (born November 1980) is a Malaysia-born author. Her debut novel, a thriller titled Yesterday, was the subject of a bidding war by publishers.

== Early life ==
Yap was born in November 1980 and raised in Kuala Lumpur. Her father refilled ATMs for a living and her mother was a clerk in a car repair shop.

== Education and career ==
In 2000 Yap began to study biochemistry at Imperial College London, after which she worked as a researcher at the European Molecular Biology Laboratory in Heidelberg. She then switched to studying history at the University of Cambridge, completing a master's degree at Sidney Sussex College and a doctorate at St Catharine's College on the subject of prisoners of the Japanese during the Second World War. In 2007, she was elected a junior research fellow at Wolfson College, Cambridge.

Yap worked as a journalist in Singapore and the United Kingdom and has written for The Economist and The Business Times. Her debut novel was a thriller titled Yesterday, followed by her second novel titled Future Perfect.

== Selected publications ==
- Future Perfect. London: Headline, 2021.
- Yesterday. New York: Mulholland Books, 2017.
