= Chuah Guat Eng =

Malaysian Peranakan Chinese writer

- Born: 1 December 1943 (age 82); Rembau, Negeri Sembilan
- Education: University of Malaya
- Occupation: Writer

Chinese name
- Chinese: 蔡月英
- Hanyu Pinyin: Cài Yuèyīng
- Hokkien POJ: Chhòa Goa̍t-eng

Chuah Guat Eng (Chinese: 蔡月英; Pe̍h-ōe-jī: Chhòa Goa̍t-eng; born 1 December 1943), is a Malaysian Peranakan Chinese writer. She was Malaysia's first English-language woman novelist.

Chuah was born in Rembau, Negeri Sembilan, and received her early education at the Methodist Girls' School, Klang and Victoria Institution, Kuala Lumpur.

She read English Literature at University of Malaya, Kuala Lumpur, and German Literature at LMU Munich. She then received a PhD from National University of Malaysia in 2008 for her thesis "From Conflict to Insight: A Zen-based Reading Procedure for the Analysis of Fiction".

== Works ==
- Echoes of Silence ISBN 9789839132014
- Tales from the Baram River ISBN 9789676111487
- The Old House & Other Stories ISBN 9789834377809
- Days of Change ISBN 9789834377816
