= Lycée Anna de Noailles (Évian-les-Bains) =

School in France

Lycée Anna de Noailles is a senior high school in Évian-les-Bains, France.

As of 2013 it had 950 students, including 120 adults. 90 of its students were boarding students.
