= Amir Muhammad (director) =

Malaysian writer and filmmaker

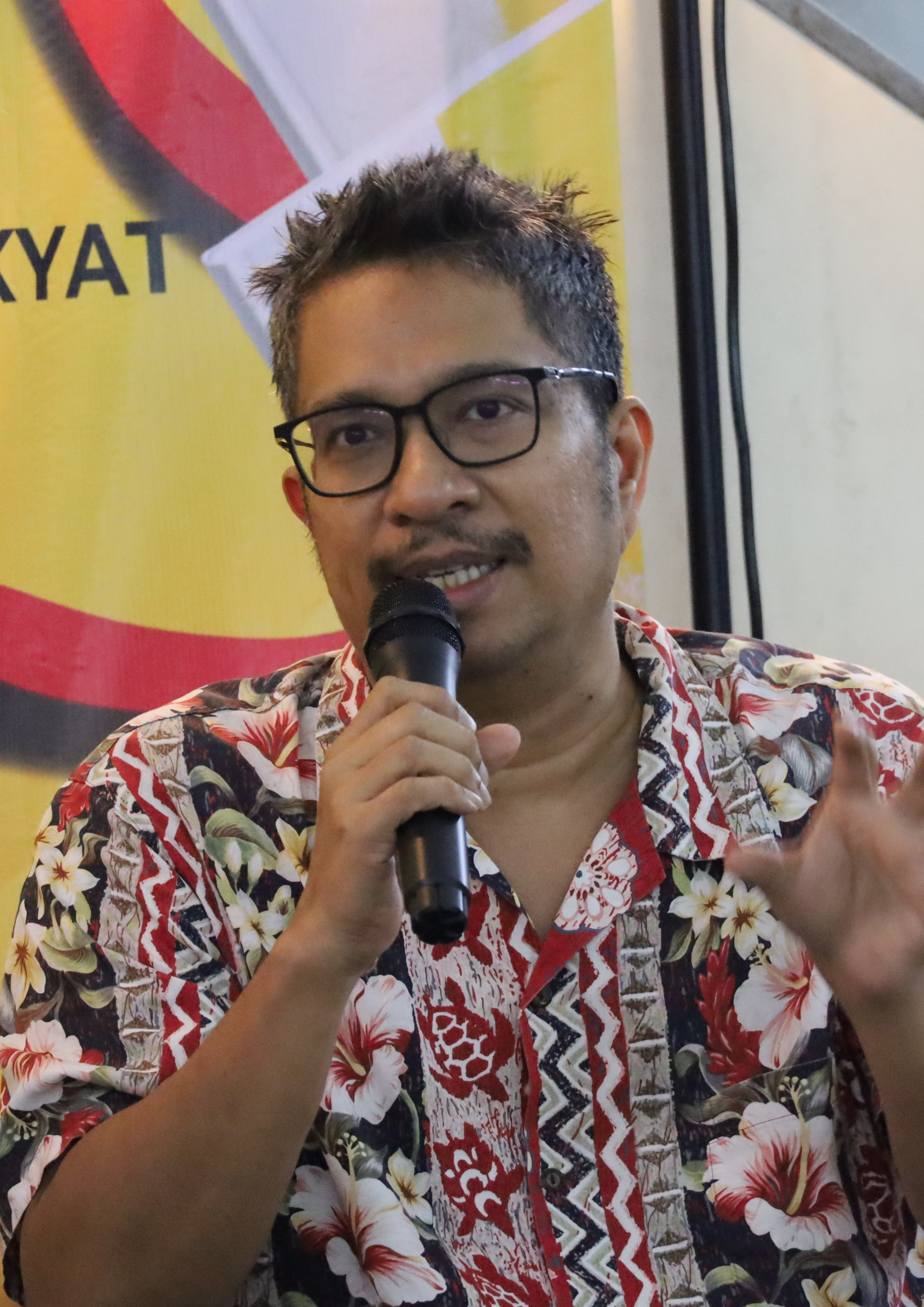
- Image of Amir
- Born: 5 December 1972 (age 53); Kuala Lumpur, Malaysia
- Education: University of East Anglia
- Website: Writing by Amir

Amir Muhammad (born 5 December 1972) is a Malaysian writer and independent filmmaker.

== Life and career ==
He was born on 5 December 1972 in Kuala Lumpur to civil servant Muhammad Abdullah and housewife Asiah Kechik. He was educated at the University of East Anglia with a degree in Law, though he never did his bar but rather worked in his sponsoring company's legal company for nine months.

He had also written for Malaysian print media since the age of 14, notably the New Straits Times, where he had worked there as a part timer under several editors. He had a dedicated column there from 1995 until it was stopped in 1999 during the general elections as the column was considered to be "unhelpful to the government in its bid to win the elections."

Amir took up filmmaking on the encouragement of film director U-Wei Haji Saari after interviewing the latter during his part-time job as the latter's film Perempuan, Isteri Dan...? was released in 1993. In 2000, he wrote and directed Malaysia's first DV feature. Some of his works have also been featured in a number of international film festivals including the Sundance Film Festival and the Berlin International Film Festival. Two of his films, Apa Khabar Orang Kampung and The Last Communist have been banned in Malaysia. A full retrospective of his work was screened at the 2008 Pesaro Film Festival, Italy. He is a partner at Da Huang Pictures.

He has repeatedly expressed the view that the role of the artist and critic is to hold up a mirror to society and ask difficult questions about its injustices.

He also publishes books under his companies Matahari Books (started in 2007) and Buku FIXI (since 2011), taking a break from film-making during this time period.

Amir also founded the annual Kuala Lumpur Alternative Bookfest in 2008.

== Filmography ==
=== Films ===
- Lips to Lips (2000)
- The Big Durian (2003) - Special citation, Dragons and Tigers Award in 2004 Vancouver International Film Festival; Special mention, New Asian Currents in 2003 Yamagata International Documentary Film Festival
- The Year of Living Vicariously (2005)
- Tokyo Magic Hour (2005)
- The Last Communist (Lelaki komunis terakhir) (2006)
- Apa Khabar Orang Kampung (Village People Radio Show) (2007)
- Susuk (2008)
- Malaysian Gods (2009)
- Kisah Pelayaran Ke Terengganu (2016)

=== Short films ===
- 6horts #1: Lost (2002) - Won, Critics prize for Best Asian Digital Film in 2002 Singapore International Film Festival (SIFF)
- 6horts #2: Friday (2002)
- 6horts #3: Mona (2002)
- 6horts #4: Checkpoint (2002)
- 6horts #5: Kamunting (2002) - Won, Silver Screen Award for Best Asian Digital Short in 2003 SIFF
- 6horts #6: Pangyau (2002)
- The Amber Sexalogy (2006)

== Books ==
- Yasmin Ahmad's Films (Matahari Books, 2009)
- Rojak (ZI Publications, 2010)
- 120 Malay Movies (Matahari Books, 2010)
- Malaysian Politicians Say the Darndest Things series (Matahari Books)
