= The Big Durian (sculpture) =

Cambodian public sculpture

Big Durian
- Medium: Sculpture
- Location: Kampot

The Big Durian is a large public work of art. It is located at the centre of the roundabout in Kampot, Cambodia. The statue recognises the historic durian industry in Kampot, which was devastated by the Khmer Rouge.
