= Jaya Shopping Centre =

Shopping centre in Petaling, Selangor, Malaysia

Coordinates: 3°06′32.2″N 101°38′13.5″E

Imago Jaya Mall
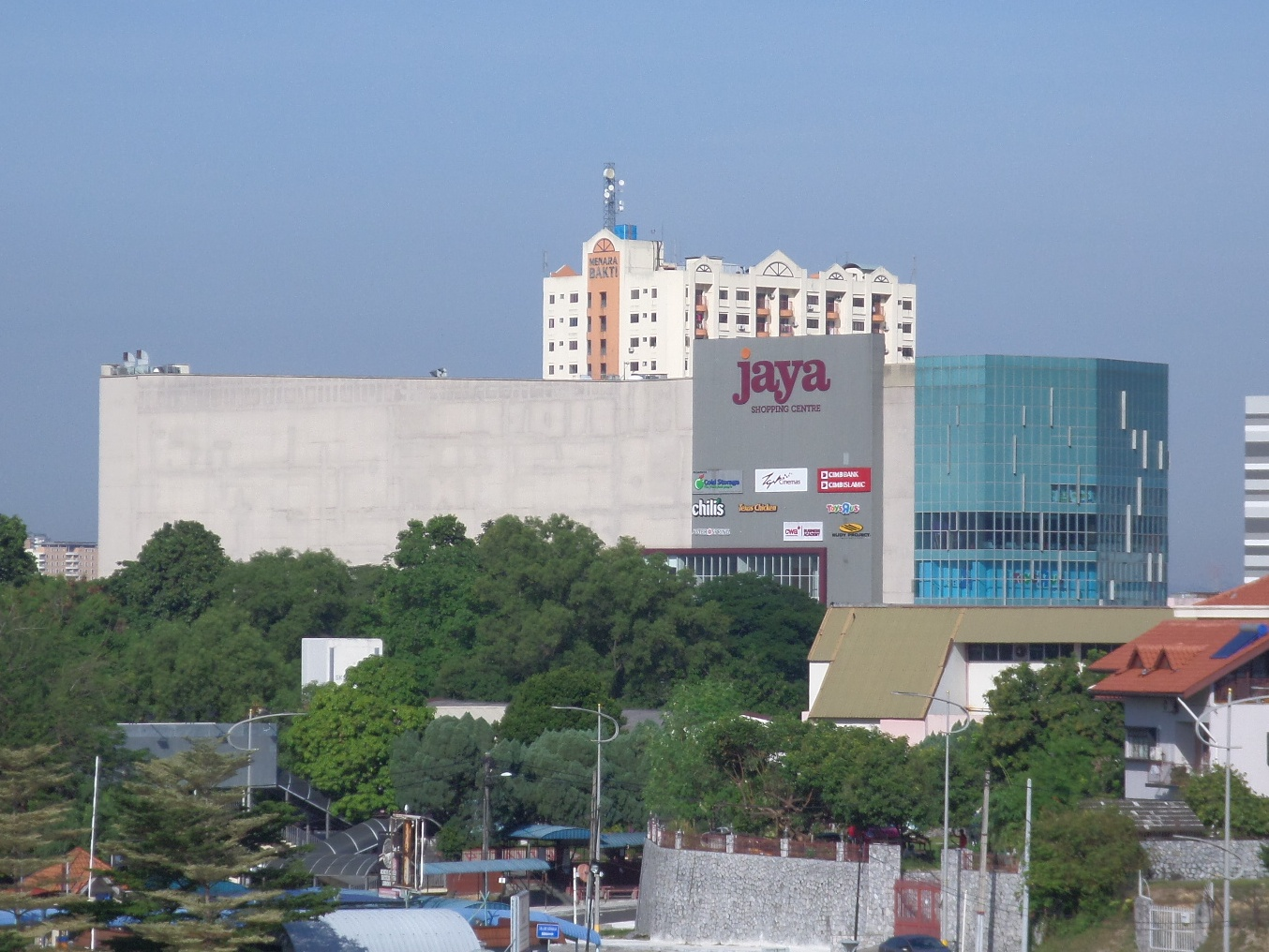
- Interactive map of the Imago Jaya Mall area

General information
- Type: Shopping centre
- Location: Section 14, Petaling Jaya, Selangor, Malaysia
- Construction started: 2008
- Completed: 2014
- Opening: 28 April 2014
- Owner: Mapletree Investments

Technical details
- Floor area: 260,000 square feet (24,000 m^{2})

Website
- www.jayashoppingcentre.my

Imago Jaya Mall was redeveloped supermarket into an approximately 260,000 square feet lifestyle mall in 2014. It is located at Section 14, Petaling Jaya, Selangor, Malaysia.

Imago Jaya Mall is a seven-storey suburban retail mall comprising more than 120 retailers and diners, an eight-screen cineplex and a supermarket. The mall also provides four basement floors of parking, which can accommodate more than 780 vehicles.
