= Trio & a Bed =

Trio & a Bed is an interactive drama shown on Astro Wah Lai Toi, a pay TV channel in Malaysia, where viewers can vote on character decisions and the outcome. The show focuses on the complex chemistry and relationships between the three guys and three girls.

== Cast ==
- Carmen Soo as Charmaine
- Amber Chia as Isabella
- Annabelle Kong as Ho Hua Meow
- Daniel Tan as Heman
- Danny Wan as Anerd
- Jeffery Chong as Sam

== Websites and news ==
- Website for 'Trio & a Bed'
- Wanita.net article on Trio & a Bed (In Chinese)

=== Cast members official websites ===
- Official website for Amber Chia, star of Trio & a Bed
- Official website for Daniel Tan, star of Trio & a Bed
