= Susuk =

Malay cultural phenomenon, needles as talismans

Susuk or charm needles, are needles made of gold or other precious metals, which are inserted into the soft tissues of the body (face, chest, breast, lower back, limbs) to act as talismans in several communities of Southeast Asia. Susuk serves various purposes, ranging from purely aesthetic to treatment of joint pains and other minor ailments. This practice is also used as protection against injuries and accidents.

With the advent age of modern medical technology i.e. radiography, the presence of susuk must be highlighted, as they may be mistaken for undesired foreign objects.

== Practice ==
Susuk has been traditionally practiced in Malaysia, Indonesia, Brunei, and Singapore.

Some practitioners perform rituals when inserting susuk needles, depending on their beliefs. These can include the susuk wearer memorising various incantations, oil rubbing, and chanting. Some susuk wearers are advised to avoid specific foods, such as lady finger bananas, papayas, and satay sticks. It is believed by some that susuk needs to be removed before death or the person will have difficulty dying. As such, susuk can be removed once the person become old or falls ill.

Within Islam the practice of susuk is considered haram. This due to the belief that susuk is a form of black magic.

The first time a susuk was photographed with radiography was in 1928. Medical professionals usually don't remove susuk, unless the needles are causing medical issues such as an infection. Removing susuk requires a skilled practitioner. However, removing susuk, which was originally for beauty, is believed to cause the person's face to revert to its natural age within six months.

Susuk wearers are often advised to keep the practice secret by their shaman, as it is believed that telling others will prevent the susuk from working. Often, susuk needles are unable to be seen or felt under the skin. This can cause surprise and concern when medical professionals discover the needles on x-rays. The needles are usually made from a gold alloy, consisting of gold, copper, and traces of silver and aluminium.

Feelings of guilt and shame may characterize the practice, as some young people (such as a young wife) may be pressured into adopting this traditional practice.

== Known users ==
Daisy Fajarina, mother of model Manohara Odelia Pinot, was said to have diamond and gold susuks in her chin. Her ex-husband, George Manz said, "Once when we were together, I took Daisy to a dentist who was then shocked when he saw her X-ray. She had small gold needles and diamond stones embedded inside her chin."

== See also ==
- Acupuncture
- Body piercing
