= Matahari Books =

Malaysian book publishing company

Matahari Books is a Malaysian publishing company founded in 2007 by Amir Muhammad. It specialises in Malaysian non-fiction and also screenplay books. It publishes books in both English and Malay.

According to the company's Facebook page, Matahari Books is an imprint of Buku Fixi.

== Titles ==
Non-fiction titles:

- Malaysian Politicians Say the Darndest Things (Vol 1) (2007) compiled by Amir Muhammad with illustrations by Shahril Nizam.
- New Malaysian Essays 1 (2008) edited by Amir Muhammad.
- New Malaysian Essays 2 (2009) edited by Amir Muhammad.
- New Malaysian Essays 3 (2010) edited by Yin Shao Loong
- Malaysian Politicians Say the Darndest Things (Vol 2) (2008) compiled by Amir Muhammad with artwork by Fahmi Reza
- The Malaysian Book of the Undead (2008) by Danny Lim
- Kitab Pengetahuan Hantu Malaysia (2008) by Danny Lim (translated by Ahmad Kamal Abu Bakar)
- Taxi Tales on a Crooked Bridge (2009) by Charlene Rajendran
- Yasmin Ahmad's Films (2009) by Amir Muhammad
- What Your Teacher Didn't Tell You (The Annexe Lectures, Vol 1.) (2009) by Farish A. Noor
- 120 Malay Movies (2010) by Amir Muhammad.
- Islam in Malaysia: Perceptions & Facts (2010) by Mohd Asri Zainul Abidin

Mixed anthologies:

- Body 2 Body: A Malaysian Queer Anthology (2009) edited by Jerome Kugan and Pang Khee Teik
- Orang Macam Kita edited by Azwan Ismail and Diana Dirani

Screenplay books:

- KAMI the Movie (2008)
- ESTET (2009)
- Pisau Cukur (2009)
