= The Last Communist =

- The Malaysian film poster
- Directed by: Amir Muhammad
- Written by: Amir Muhammad
- Produced by: Amir Muhammad
- Starring: Zalila Lee; Adibah Noor
- Cinematography: Albert Hue
- Edited by: Azharr Rudin
- Music by: Hardesh Singh
- Distributed by: Red Films
- Release date: 2006
- Running time: 90 minutes
- Country: Malaysia
- Languages: Mandarin; Malay; Cantonese; Hokkien; English; Tamil

The Last Communist (Malay: Lelaki Komunis Terakhir) is a 2006 Malaysian film described by director Amir Muhammad as a "semi-musical documentary". It is inspired by the leader of the disbanded Malayan Communist Party, Chin Peng and the Malayan Emergency (1948–1960) during which more than 10,000 Malayan and British troops and civilians lost their lives. The film was banned from screening in Malaysia by the government's Home Affairs Ministry.

The film features interviews with people in the towns in which Peng lived from birth to national independence, interspersed with songs that are fashioned after propaganda films.

The Last Communist made its world premiere at the 2006 Berlin Film Festival. It has also been shown at the Seattle International Film Festival, the London Film Festival, the Singapore International Film Festival and the Hong Kong International Film Festival, but has never been publicly shown in its home country. The film has been uploaded in its entirety on YouTube.

== See also ==
- History of Malaysia
