= Évian-les-Bains =

Commune in Auvergne-Rhône-Alpes, France

Évian-les-Bains Èvian (Arpitan)
- Commune
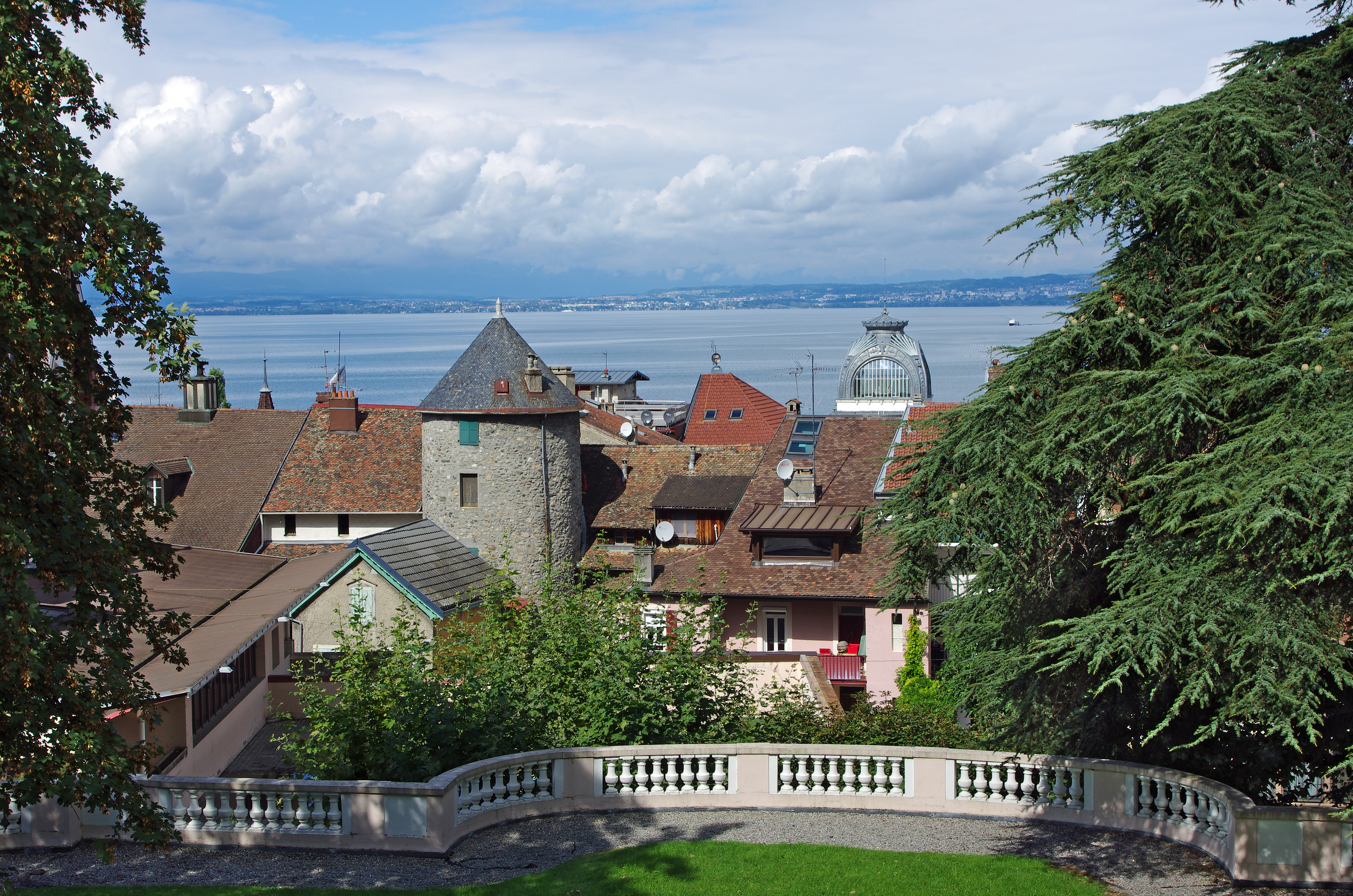
- A view of Lake Geneva from Évian-les-Bains

- Coat of arms
- Location of Évian-les-Bains
- Location within France Location within Auvergne-Rhône-Alpes
- Coordinates: 46°23′00″N 6°35′00″E
- Country: France
- Region: Auvergne-Rhône-Alpes
- Department: Haute-Savoie
- Arrondissement: Thonon-les-Bains
- Canton: Évian-les-Bains
- Intercommunality: CC Pays d'Évian Vallée d'Abondance

Government
  - Mayor (2020–2026): Josiane Lei
- Area^{1}: 4.3 km^{2} (1.7 sq mi)
- Highest elevation: 739 m (2,425 ft)
- Lowest elevation: 372 m (1,220 ft)
- Population (2023): 9,267
  - Density: 2,200/km^{2} (5,600/sq mi)
- Demonym: Évianais
- Time zone: UTC+01:00 (CET)
  - Summer (DST): UTC+02:00 (CEST)
- INSEE/Postal code: 74119 /74500
- Website: ville-evian.fr
- ^{1} French Land Register data, which excludes lakes, ponds, glaciers > 1 km^{2} (0.386 sq mi or 247 acres) and river estuaries.

Évian-les-Bains ([evjɑ̃ le bɛ̃]; lit. 'Évian-the-Baths'; Arpitan: Èvian, Évyan, or L'Èvian), or simply Évian, is a commune in Eastern France, by the Swiss border. It is located in the northern part of the Haute-Savoie department in the Auvergne-Rhône-Alpes region.

An upmarket holiday resort and spa town on the shores of Lake Geneva (French: Lac Léman), it has been visited, over two centuries, by royalty such as Kings Edward VII and George V of the United Kingdom and King Farouk of Egypt, and celebrities such as Countess Anna de Noailles and Marcel Proust.

In international relations, it is the namesake of the 1962 Évian Accords, which ended the Algerian War, and its Hôtel Royal hosted the 29th G8 summit in 2003 and 52nd G7 summit in 2026.

== History ==
=== Birth of an elite spa town ===
The springs of Évian were still rather unknown at the time of the French Revolution, but the First Empire's interest for spa towns inspired a scientist to analyse them in 1807 and 1808.

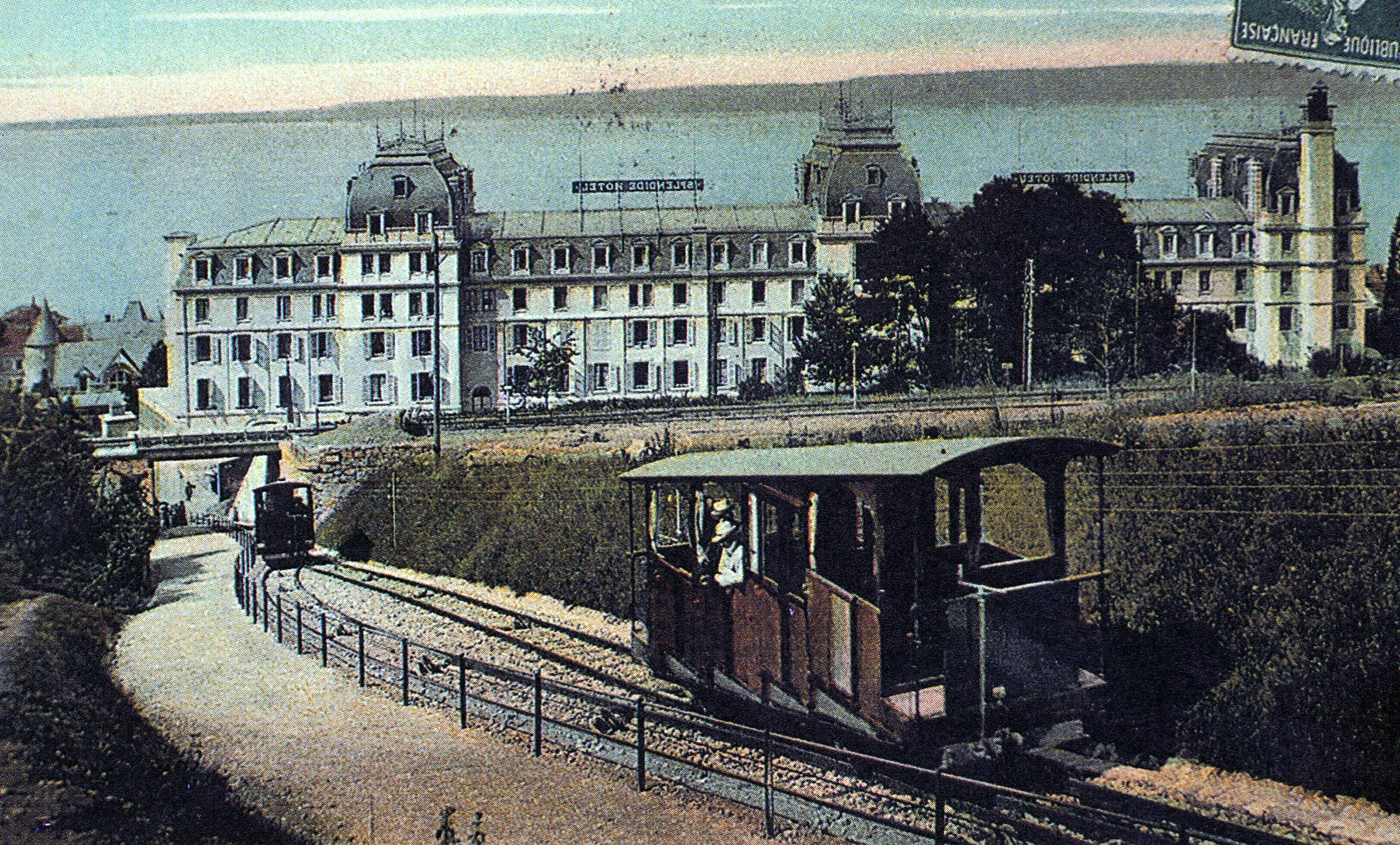
Postcard of Évian, 1907

A lakeside port and a new road (RN5) connecting the town to Milan and Paris were constructed in 1809. In 1823, Genevan entrepreneur M. Fauconnet launched the Évian mineral water company (Société des Eaux Minérales d'Évian) and in March 1827 purchased the city's two main springs, the better-known being the Cachat spring named after the family that sold it. M. Fauconnet's company eventually went bankrupt, and the springs were bought by the Hôtel des Bains.

In the 1818 novel Frankenstein; or, The Modern Prometheus, by Mary Shelley, Victor Frankenstein spends the first night of his honeymoon in Évian, but cannot prevent his monster from strangling his young wife Elizabeth. Mary Shelley travelled through Évian in 1817 with her partner, the famous English poet Percy Bysshe Shelley. In a letter, the impression the town leaves on him is rather bad: "The appearance of the inhabitants of Evian is more wretched, diseased and poor, than I ever recollect to have seen."

In the following years, many hotels (Hôtel des Quatre saisons, Hôtel de France, Hôtel des Alpes) were built, helping the town's popularity as a holiday resort.

=== Golden Age of the Belle Époque and the Roaring Twenties ===
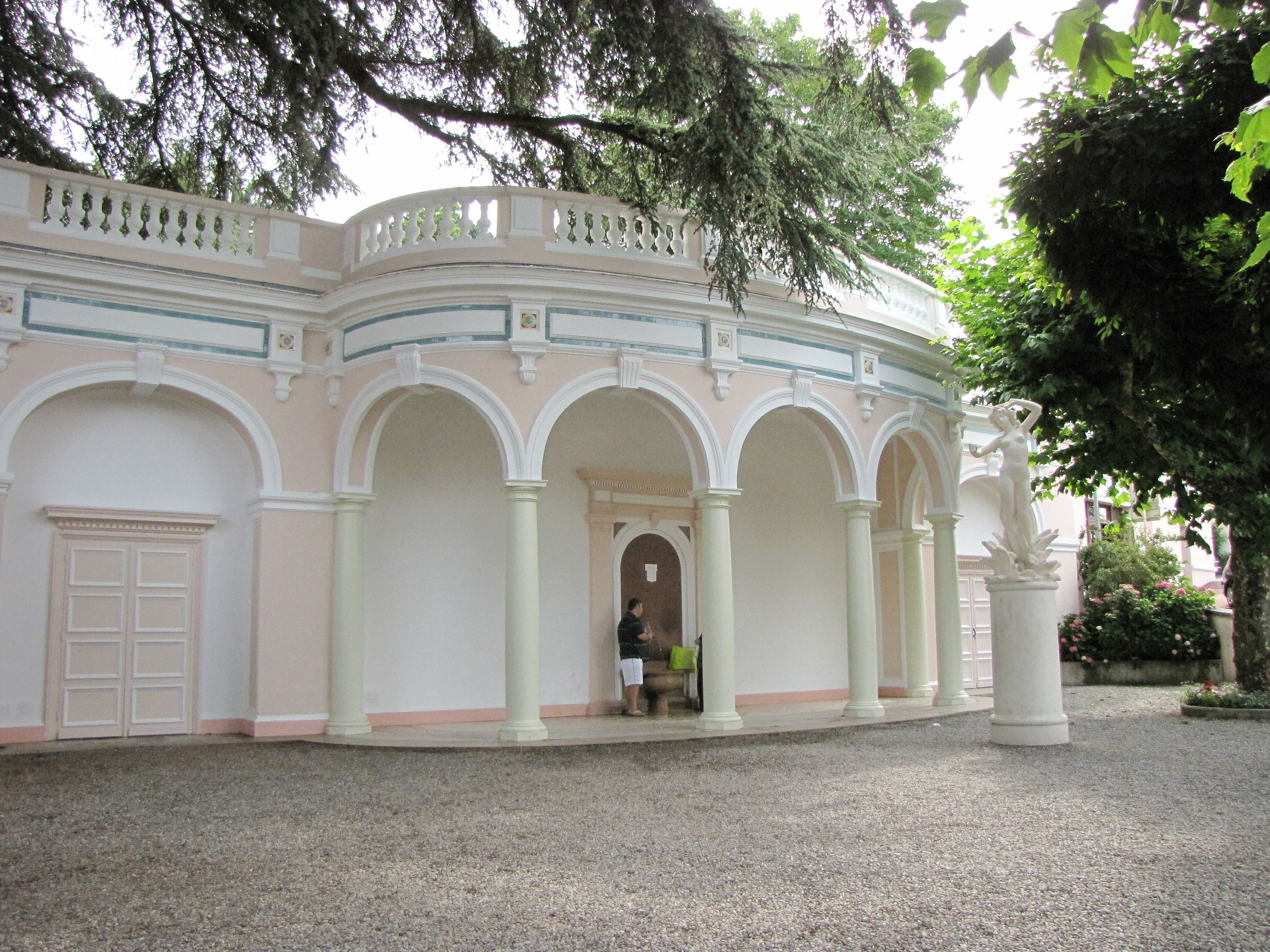
The Cachat spring

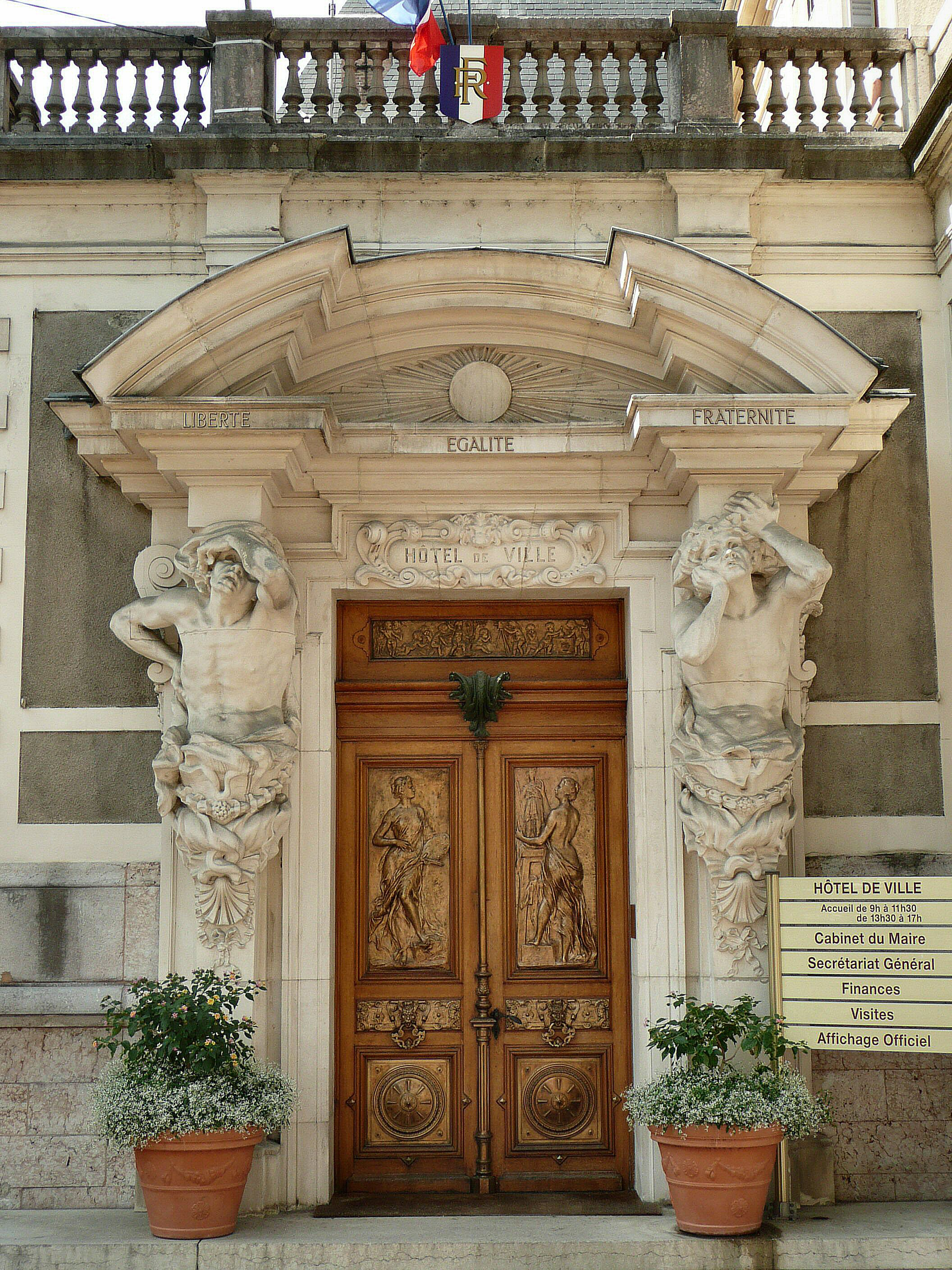
Entrance of the Lumière brothers' villa

The Cachat mineral waters SA (Société Anonyme des Eaux Minérales de Cachat) was created as an anonymous company in December 1859 by Parisian investors, selling Évian water, and in 1865 the small town changed its name to Évian-les-Bains to promote its rise as a spa town. Three other springs joined the Cachat (Guillot, Bonnevie, Corporau). Improvement in transportation (a railroad station) helped make the town a more famous spa.

In the late 19th century, the city contained more than 20 hotels. The hills and the lakeshore were covered with noble houses and luxurious villas and a theatre and a casino were built on the lakeside. In 1902, the baths were constructed and in 1909, the architect Hébrard built one of the most luxurious hotels: the Royal Hotel. Évian considers itself one of the top European spas, claiming popularity with high society figures such as Countess Anna de Noailles, Frédéric Mistral, the Lumière brothers and Marcel Proust.

After World War I, the city maintained its status as a high-class spa town, hosting socialites and royalty such as Aga Khan III, the Maharaja of Kapurthala, King George V of United Kingdom, King Fuad I of Egypt, as well as French president Albert Lebrun.

The Évian Conference was convened in Évian in July 1938 to discuss the problem of Jewish refugees. During World War II, German forces occupied Évian and the town's statue of General Dupas was removed.

=== Contemporary ===
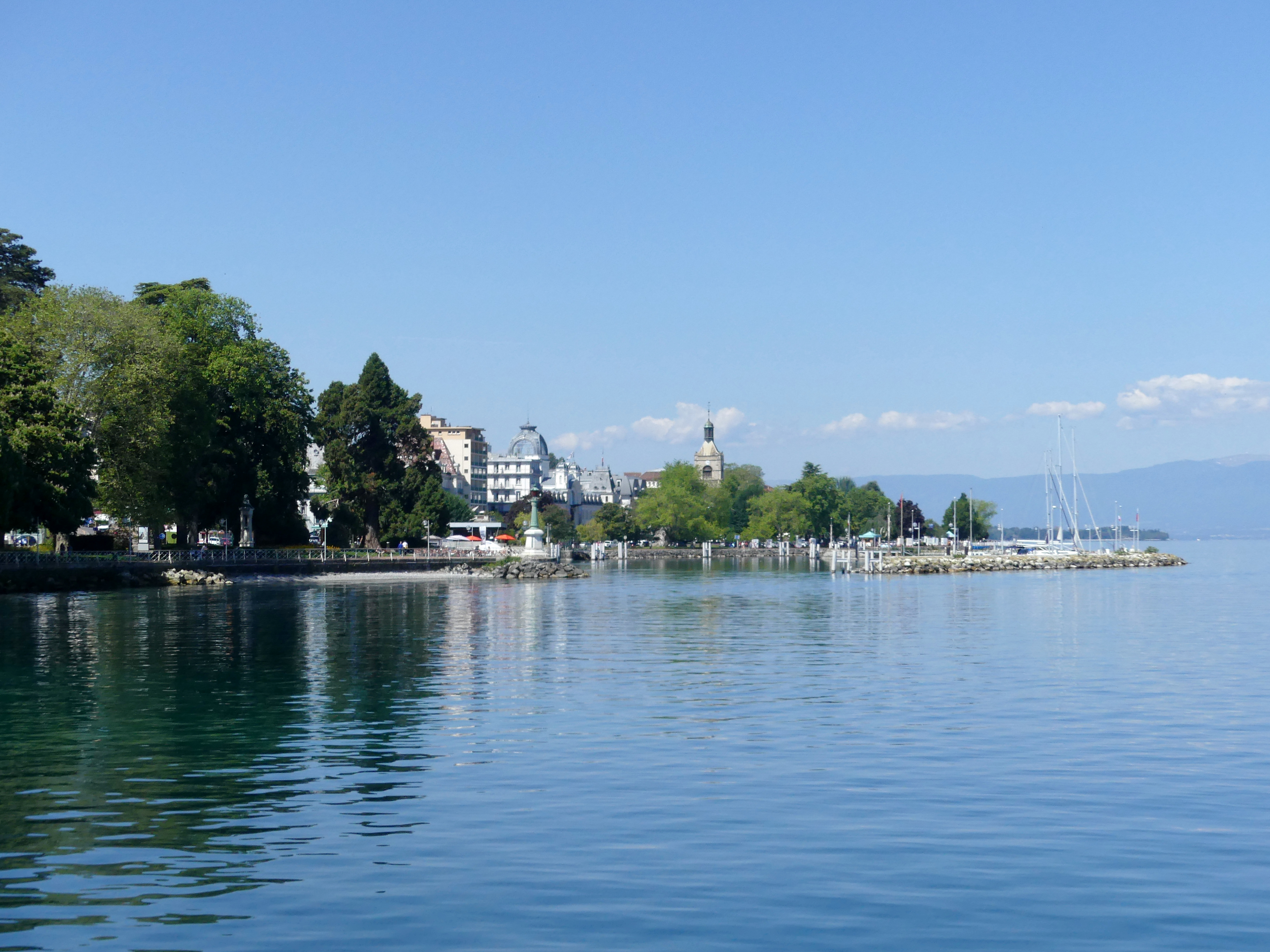
Lakeside view of Évian

The Évian Accords, which ended the Algerian War and recognised an independent Algeria, were signed there on 18 March 1962. The G8 began its 29th summit meeting in Évian from 1 to 3 June 2003. Évian hosted the 52nd G7 summit from 15 to 17 June 2026, making it the first French town to host a G7 or G8 leaders' summit twice.

Évian still derives funding as a holiday resort and spa town.

== Geography ==
=== Climate ===
The climate is continental mountainous, characterized by a marked humidity. Winters are cold and snowy and the summer season is mild with occasional stormy episodes. The off-seasons (April and October) are also on average relatively humid.

Annecy–Meythet — Average period 1981–2010 except insolation 1961–1990
Month	Jan	Feb	Mar	Apr	May	Jun	Jul	Aug	Sep	Oct	Nov	Dec	Year
Maximum temperatures (in °C)	5.4	7.6	12.0	15.6	20.5	24.0	26.1	25.7	20.7	16.0	9.5	5.6	15.9 °C
Minimum temperatures (in °C)	−1.6	−1.0	1.6	4.7	9.5	12.5	14.3	14.1	10.4	7.2	2.3	−0.7	6.2 °C
Rainfall (average in mm)	91.2	82.2	94.6	102.8	105.1	90.0	100.8	114.8	123.3	118.0	116.8	109.9	1253 mm
Average days with rainfall (> 1 mm)	11.1	9.4	10.2	10.3	11.6	9.1	9.6	10.2	9.1	11.4	11.7	10.9	125 days
Average hours of sunshine	93	117	172	196	224	262	277	242	192	138	83	70	2046 h
Maximum temperatures since 1970 (in °C)	16.4	19.3	23.5	27.7	32.6	35.1	38.0	38.5	30.7	26.5	22.1	19.9	38.5 °C
Years of maximum temperatures	2003	2017	1972	2018	2009	2019	2019	2003	2018	1977	2015	2000	Aug 2003
Minimum temperatures since 1970 (in °C)	−23.0	−15.5	−15.0	−6.0	−2.0	1.0	3.0	1.5	−2.5	−5.0	−11.5	−16.0	−23.0 °C
Years of minimum temperatures	1971	1978	1971	1975	1979	1975	1977	1978	1972	1973	1973	1973	Jan 1971
Source: Météo France

== Economy ==
The town is home to Évian mineral water, which adds significantly to the economy, together with the Casino d'Évian, the largest themed casino in Europe, and the Évian Royal Resort. Many of the inhabitants of Évian work in Lausanne and other Swiss cities nearby.

== Évian Resort ==
The Évian Resort is a hospitality and wellness estate located in the town owned by Danone. The Resort contains fours hotels: the Hôtel Royal, the Hôtel Ermitage, La Verniaz, and Le Manoir. The Hôtel Royal was inaugurated in 1909 and named after Edward VII. Notable guests include Donald Trump, Emmanuel Macron, Rita Hayworth, Ringo Starr,Marcel Proust, Patrick Modiano, Elizabeth II, and Aga Khan III. The former two are rumored to have had their own personal apartments in the hotel. The hotel hosted the G8 and G7, as well as the Évian Conference. The hotel also has a Michelin starred restaurant.

The Evian Resort Golf Club is also part of the estate, as well as the Casino Evian, the thermal baths located in the town, and a performing arts center known as Les Mélèzes. The Resort also puts on the The Evian Championship every year.

== Transport ==
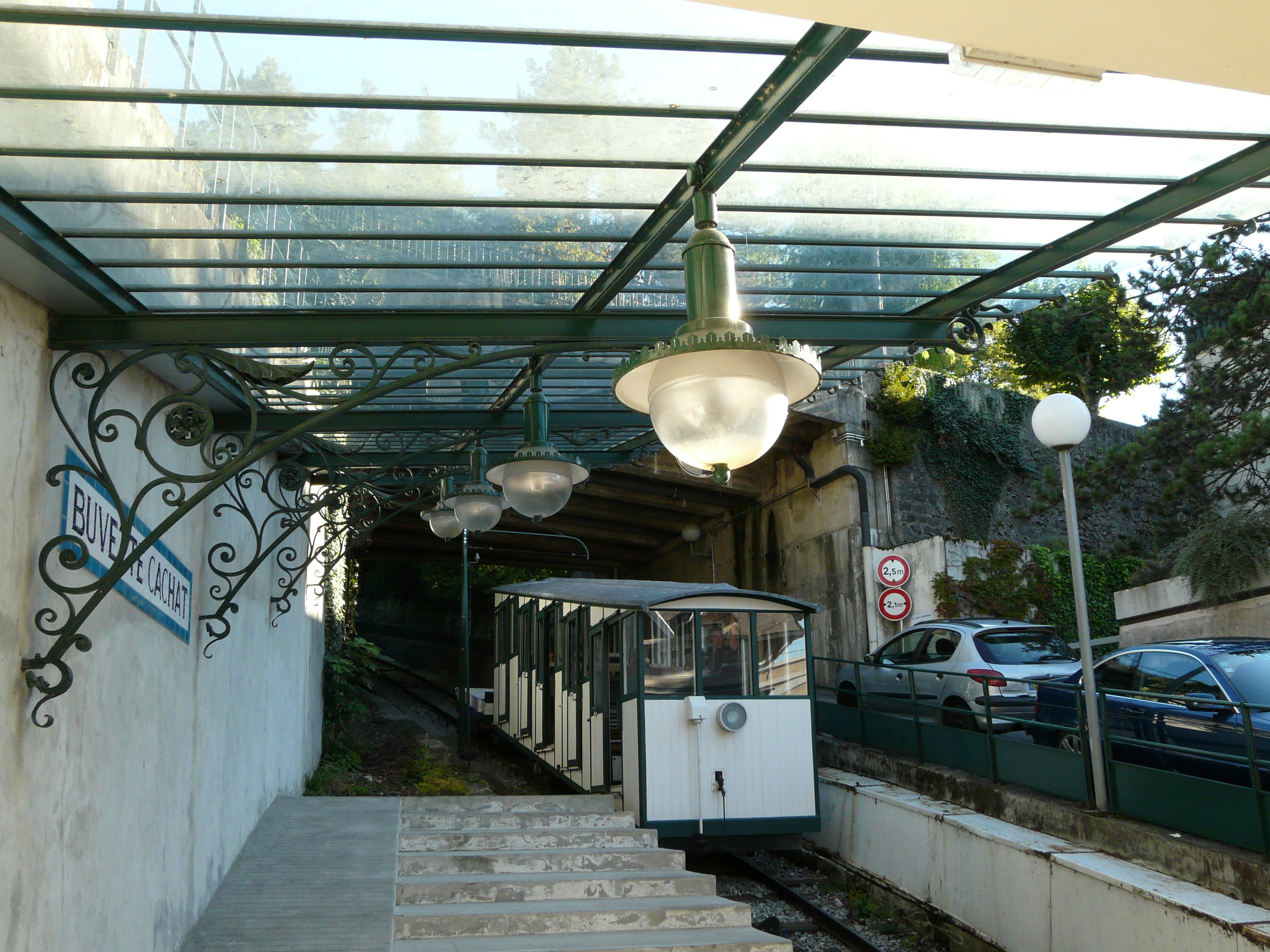
The funicular

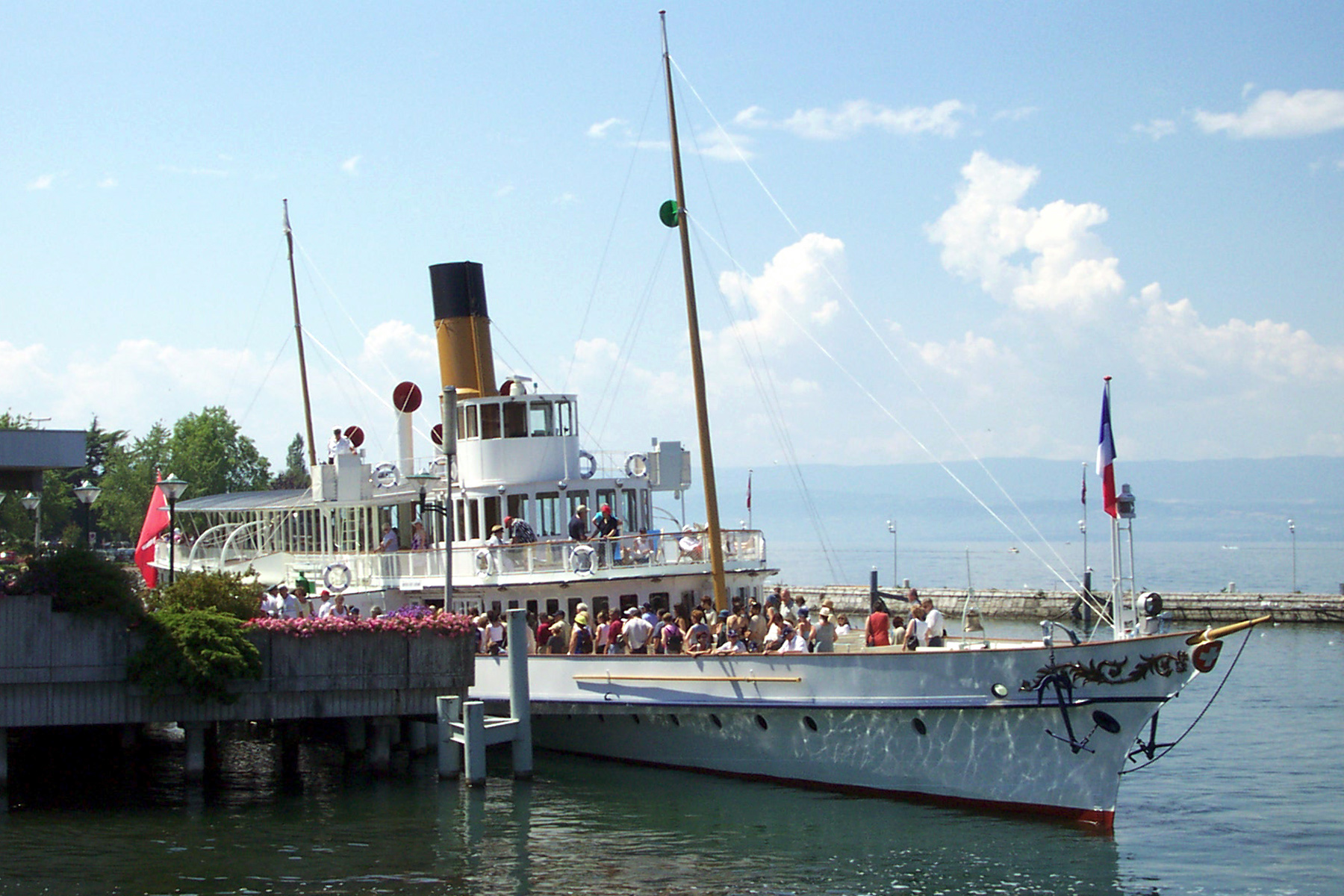
CGN paddle steamer Montreux leaving Évian-les-Bains in July 2002.

Évian is served locally by a funicular, the Funiculaire d'Évian-les-Bains, which has six stations, as well as a bus network. Évian-les-Bains station offers regular train services to Geneva, Switzerland, Annemasse, and Bellegarde, as well as less frequent services to Paris and Lyon. There is also a very busy ferry service running between the town and Lausanne across the lake, as well as a more tourist-centred service that runs to Yvoire. The closest international airport to Évian-les-Bains is Geneva Airport.

== Education ==
Public nursery/preschools and primary schools serving the town include: École du Centre, École de la Détanche, Écoles du Mur Blanc, and École des Hauts d'Évian. Collège des Rives du Léman is the public junior high school, and Lycée Anna de Noailles is the senior high school.

École Saint-Bruno is a private nursery/preschool, primary school, and junior high school.

== Sport ==
The town has some golf courses, notably the Evian Resort Golf Club, which hosts The Evian Championship, every summer. It is one of the five women's major championships.

The Evian Thonon Gaillard F.C. football club was located here before relocating to Thonon-les-Bains.

The Club de l'Aviron d'Évian is the local rowing club.

The town also hosts an annual Évian triathlon.

== Culture ==
In 1993, a concert hall named La Grange du Lac was opened after Mstislav Rostropovich was hired as an artistic director for a new festival. In 2017, the concert hall was restored.

Today, the town hosts many music festivals such as the annual classical Rencontres Musicales d’Évian Festival.

The town also has many museums such as the Palais Lumière, and the Buvette Cachat which reopened in 2026.

== Population ==
Historical population
Year	Pop.	±% p.a.
1968	5,863	—
1975	6,026	+0.39%
1982	6,018	−0.02%
1990	6,895	+1.72%
1999	7,273	+0.59%
2007	8,137	+1.41%
2012	8,527	+0.94%
2017	9,098	+1.30%
2023	9,267	+0.31%
Source: INSEE

== Notable people ==
- Pierre-Louis Dupas (1761–1823) was a French soldier, associated with Napoleon Bonaparte
- Gaston Marie Jacquier (1904–1976), prelate of the Catholic Church in Algeria where he was killed
- Yves Brunier (1962–1991), landscape architect
- Gilles Jacquier (1968–2012), photojournalist, killed while covering the Syrian Civil War

=== Sport ===
- Patrick Blanc (born 1972), ski mountaineer.
- Johann Durand (born 1981), football goalkeeper, played 205 games for Evian.
- Anthony Chalençon (born 1990), visually impaired cross-country skier and biathlete, team gold medallist at the 2018 Winter Olympics
- Camille Bened (born 2000), biathlete, team gold medallist at the relay at the 2026 Winter Olympics

== See also ==
- Communes of the Haute-Savoie department
- List of G8 summit resorts
