= Luang Prabang Film Festival =

Annual Laotian event

The Luang Prabang Film Festival (LPFF) is a non-profit organization that provides a platform for showcasing Southeast Asia’s film industry.

LPFF hosts a yearly film festival in Luang Prabang, Laos, which features works solely from ASEAN-member countries. Additionally, the organization supports various educational activities, competitions and small grants for filmmakers from Laos and the greater Southeast Asian region throughout the year.

== Background ==
The Luang Prabang Film Festival was founded as a non-profit cultural organization in 2010 by Gabriel Kuperman. The organization’s mission is to “celebrate filmmaking and promote cultural exchange in Southeast Asia, while supporting a sustainable local industry and art form.”

The Luang Prabang Film Festival is held annually in the UNESCO World Heritage town of Luang Prabang, Laos. The film festival showcases feature films of all genres from ASEAN-member countries (Brunei, Cambodia, Indonesia, Laos, Malaysia, Myanmar, the Philippines, Singapore, Thailand, and Vietnam).

Since its inaugural year in 2010, Luang Prabang Film Festival has been a leading platform for showcasing innovative Southeast Asian cinema, attracting over 2,000 attendees to each night-time screening. The festival is held over one week each December; all of its screenings are free and open to the public.

The festival generally screens art-house films in the afternoon at Sofitel Luang Prabang. LPFF screens its night programming, geared towards the local Lao audience, at Luang Prabang's Handicraft Market square. LPFF's Motion Picture Ambassadors––a team of film experts from ASEAN-member countries–– propose the programming for the festival each year.

Motion Picture Ambassadors
Name	Country
Sok Visal	Cambodia
Gayatri Nadya	Indonesia
Somsanouk Mixay	Laos
Amir Muhammad	Malaysia
Thaiddhi	Myanmar
Francis Joseph A. Cruz	Philippines
Aishah Abu Bakar	Singapore
Kong Rithdee	Thailand
Minh Trinh	Vietnam

=== Educational activities ===
LPFF hosts a variety of educational workshops and activities, aimed at developing storytelling, filmmaking and production skills within the regional Lao and greater Southeast Asian communities.

The organization facilitates Lao Filmmakers Fund, the country’s only publicly generated grant program for filmmakers. Support for the grant comes from Oxfam International.

=== MEKONG 2030 project ===
LPFF produced a cross-border film anthology and has invited filmmakers from the five Southeast Asian Mekong-region countries to envision the future of the Mekong River and its dependent communities in the year 2030. The anthology is co-directed by Kulikar Sotho (from Cambodia), Anysay Keola (from Laos), Sai Naw Kham (from Myanmar), Anocha Suwichakornpong (from Thailand), and Pham Ngoc Lan (from Vietnam).

== Past events ==
The following is a list of the programming for various past events:

=== 2017 ===
Film title	Director	Country	Release year
The Anniversary	Chilasak Saysanith	Laos	2017
In My Hometown	Worrawut Lakchai	Thailand	2017
Father and Son	Luong Dinh Dung	Vietnam	2017
2 Cool 2 Be 4Gotten	Petersen Vargas	Philippines	2016
Bad Genius	Nattawut Poonpiriya	Thailand	2017
Blood Road	Nicolas Schrunk	Laos, Vietnam, Cambodia	2017
Burma Storybook	Petr Lom, Corinne van Egeraat	Myanmar	2017
By The Time It Gets Dark	Anocha Suwichakornpong	Thailand	2016
Cemetery of Splendour	Apichatpong Weerasethakul	Thailand	2016
The Couple	Talent 1 Team	Thailand	2014
Die Beautiful	Jun Robles Lana	Philippines	2016
Fanatic	Charlie Nguyen	Vietnam	2016
Heart Attack	Nawapol Thamrongrattanarit	Thailand	2015
In Exile	Tin Win Naing	Myanmar	2015
The Island Funeral	Pimpaka Towira	Thailand	2015
Jailbreak	Jimmy Henderson	Cambodia	2015
Khuannang	Somphong Phondy	Laos	2014
Legend of the Broken Sword	Bin Bunluerit	Thailand	2017
Mind Cage	Amit Dubey	Cambodia	2017
Motherland	Ramona S. Diaz	Philippines	2017
Ordinary People	Eduardo Roy, Jr.	Philippines	2016
Railway Sleepers	Sompot Chidgasornpongse	Thailand	2016
Redha	Tunku Mona Riza	Malaysia	2016
Rina 2	Harlif Mohamad	Laos, Brunei	2017
Santi-Vina	Thavi Na Bangchang	Thailand	1954
Saving Sally	Avid Liongoren	Philippines	2016
Snap	Kongdej Jaturanrasamee	Thailand	2015
Turah	Wicaksono Wisnu Legowo	Indonesia	2016
Unlucky Plaza	Ken Kwek	Singapore	2014
Wandering	Boonsong Nakphoo	Thailand	2016
Women of the Weeping River	Sheron Dayoc	Philippines	2016
You Mean the World to Me	Saw Teong Hin	Malaysia	2017

=== 2016 ===
Title	Country	Director	Release year
A Copy of My Mind	Indonesia	Joko Anwar	2015
A Yellow Bird	Singapore	K. Rajagopal	2016
About a Woman	Indonesia	Teddy Soeriaatmadja	2014
Apocalypse Child	Philippines	Mario Cornejo	2015
Back to the 90s	Thailand	Yanyong Kuruaungkoul	2015
Banana Pancakes and the Children of Sticky Rice	Laos	Daan Veldhuizen	2015
Before the Fall	Cambodia	Ian White	2015
Brutal	Malaysia	Shanjhey Kumar Perumal	2015
Cambodian Son	Cambodia	Masahiro Sugano	2015
City of Jade	Myanmar	Midi Z	2016
The Crescent Moon	Indonesia	Ismail Basbeth	2015
Diamond Island	Cambodia	Davy Chou	2016
The Down	Thailand	Pisut Mahaphan	2015
Finding Phong	Vietnam	Tran Phuong Thao, Swann Dubus	2015
Fundamentally Happy	Singapore	Tan Bee Thiam, Lei Yuan Bin	2015
Haze	Philippines	Ralson Jover	2015
Joking Jazz 4G	Thailand	Poj Arnon	2016
Khunpan	Thailand	Kongkiat Komesiri	2016
Louis Loves Baitong	Laos	Thavisack Thammavongsa	2016
Love	Vietnam	Viet Max	2015
Love Forever	Laos	Sonexay Keomanivong	2016
Lovesucks	Thailand	Manatsanun Phanlerdwongsakul	2015
Ma'Rosa	Philippines	Brillante Mendoza	2015
May Who?	Thailand	Chayanop Boonprakob	2015
Ola Bola	Malaysia	Keng Guan Chiu	2016
Question of Faith	Indonesia	Hanung Bramantyo	2015
The Return	Singapore	Green Zeng	2015
The River Flows	Laos	Makoto Kumazawa	2017
Senior	Thailand	Wisit Sasanatieng	2015
Sweet Twenty	Vietnam	Phan Gia Nhut Linh	2015
There's No Forever	Philippines	Dan Villegas	2015
Y/Our Music	Thailand	Waraluck Hiransrettawat Every, David Reeve	2014

=== 2015 ===
Title	Country	Director	Release year
The Act of Killing	Indonesia	Joshua Oppenheimer	2012
Above it All	Laos	Anysay Keola	2015
The Cambodian Space Project – Not Easy Rock 'N' Roll	Cambodia	Marc Eberle	2015
Chiang Khan Story	Thailand	Yuthlert Sippapak	2014
Crocodile	Philippines	Francis Xavier Pasion	2014
Dandelion	Vietnam	Nguyễn Quang Huy	2014
Dearest Sister	Laos	Mattie Do	2016
Flapping in the Middle of Nowhere	Vietnam	Nguyen Hoang Diep	2014
Gems on the Run	Cambodia	Sok Visal, Quentin Clausin	2014
Hanuman	Cambodia	Jimmy Henderson	2015
I Fine... Thank You... Love You	Thailand	Mez Tharatorn	2014
I Love You!	Laos	Thavisack Thammavongsa	2015
The Last Executioner	Thailand	Tom Waller	2014
The Last Reel	Cambodia	Kulikar Sotho	2014
The Look of Silence	Indonesia	Joshua Oppenheimer	2014
Mariquina	Philippines	Milo Sogueco	2014
Men Who Save The World	Malaysia	Liew Seng Tat	2014
The Monk	Thailand	The Maw Naing	2014
Ms. J Contemplates Her Choice	Singapore	Jason Lai	2014
Pu Bao Tai Ban: Isaan Indy	Thailand	Uten Sririwi, Jinnapat Ladarat	2014
Really Love 2	Laos	Phoumsana Sirivongsa	2015
The Search for Weng Weng	Philippines	Andrew Leavold	2013
The Second Life of Thieves	Malaysia	Woo Ming Jin	2014
Siti	Indonesia	Eddie Cahyono	2014
Slam!	Singapore	M. Raihan Halim	2014
Somboon	Thailand	Krisda Tipchaimeta	2014
Still I Strive	Cambodia	Adam Pfleghaar, A. Todd Smith	2014
Village of Hope	Thailand	Boonsong Nakphoo	2013
That Thing Called Meant-To-Be	Philippines	Antoinette Jadaone	2014

=== 2014 ===
Title	Country	Director	Release year
3.5	Cambodia	Chhay Bora	2013
Aroma of Heaven	Indonesia	Budi Kurniawan	2014
The Boatbuilders of Mermaid Island	Malaysia	Azharr Rudin, Imri Nasution	2013
By the River	Thailand	Nontawat Numbenchapol	2013
Catnip	Philippines	Kevin Dayrit	2012
Concrete Clouds	Thailand	Lee Chatametikool	2013
Ilo Ilo	Singapore	Anthony Chen	2013
Iskalawags	Philippines	Keith Deligero	2014
Jalanan	Indonesia	Daniel Ziv	2014
The Jungle School	Indonesia	Riri Riza	2013
Madam Phung's Last Journey	Vietnam	Nguyen Thi Tham	2014
The Mangoes	Indonesia	Tonny Trimarsanto	2012
Mary is Happy, Mary is Happy	Thailand	Nawapol Thamrongrattanarit	2013
The Missing Picture	Cambodia	Rithy Panh	2013
My Teacher	Laos	Niyom Wongpongkham	2014
The Patriarch	Philippines	Alfonso Torre	2013
Pee Mak Phrakanong	Thailand	Banjong Pisanthanakun	2013
Really Love	Laos	Phoumsana Sirivongsa	2014
Return to Burma	Myanmar	Midi Z	2011
Sayang Disayang	Singapore	Sanif Olek	2013
Shift	Philippines	Siege Ledesma	2013
The Songs of Rice	Thailand	Uruphong Raksasad	2013
The Talent	Vietnam	Quang Huy	2013
The Teacher's Diary	Thailand	Nithiwat Tharatorn	2014
Tuk Tuk	Laos	Simon Luang Kiyé	2012
Vientiane in Love	Laos	Vannaphone Sitthirath	2014
We Are Moluccans	Indonesia	Angga Dwimas Sasongko	2014
When the Rooster Crows	Singapore	Leonardo Cinieri Lombroso	2014

=== 2013 ===
Title	Country	Director	Release year
13:00 Sunday	Laos, Thailand	Bis Srikasem, Pume Peerabun	2013
A River Changes Course	Cambodia	Kalyanee Mam	2013
Ah Boys to Men	Singapore	Jack Neo	2012
Big Heart	Laos	Mattiphob Douangmyxay	2013
Boundary	Thailand, Cambodia	Nontawat Numbenchapol	2013
Contradiction	Malaysia	Nazri M Annuar, Aloy Paradoks	2012
Dancing Across Borders	Cambodia	Anne Bass	2010
Denok & Gareng	Indonesia	Dwi Sujanti Nugraheni	2012
Grean Fictions	Thailand	Chookiat Sakveerakul	2013
Headshot	Thailand	Pen-ek Ratanaruang	2011
Here... or There?	Vietnam	Síu Phạm	2011
The Hidden: Wrath of Azazil	Malaysia	Kabir Bhatia	2013
Home	Thailand	Chookiat Sakveerakul	2012
I Love Savanh	Laos	Bounthong Nhotmanhkong	2013
Karaoke Girl	Thailand	Visra Vichit-vadakarn	2013
Kil	Malaysia	Nik Amir Mustapha	2013
Lovely Man	Indonesia	Teddy Soeriaatmadja	2011
Mater Dolorosa	Philippines	Adolfo Alix, Jr.	2012
P-047	Thailand	Kongdej Jaturanrasmee	2011
Red Scarf	Laos	Sackchai Deenan	2011
Rising Sun on The Horizon	Myanmar	Khin Maung Oo, Soe Thein Htut	2011
Scent of Burning Grass	Vietnam	Nguyễn Hữu Mười	2012
Tang Wong	Thailand	Kongdej Jaturanrasmee	2013
Thy Womb	Philippines	Brillante Mendoza	2012
What Is It About Rina?	Brunei	Harlif Haji Mohamad, Farid Azlan	2013
What Isn't There	Philippines	Marie Jamora	2012
What They Don't Talk About When They Talk About Love	Indonesia	Mouly Surya	2012

=== 2012 ===
Title	Country	Director	Release year
24 Hours of Anger	Singapore	T T Dhavamanni	2010
Already Famous	Singapore	Michelle Chong	2011
Always on My Mind	Laos	Sakchai Deenan	2012
Boundary	Philippines	Benito Bautista	2011
Bounthanh: Lost in the City	Laos	Sackchai Deenan	2011
Breakfast, Lunch, Dinner	Thailand, Singapore	Wang Jing, Anocha Suwichakornpong, Kaz Cai	2010
Bunohan	Malaysia	Dain Said	2011
Chang	Laos	Merian C. Cooper, Ernest B. Schoedsack	1927
Chanthaly	Laos	Mattie Do	2012
The Cheer Ambassadors	Thailand	Luke Cassady-Dorion	2012
The Dance of an Alchemist	Myanmar	Me Pwar	2009
Dance of Two Feet Left	Philippines	Alvin Yapan, Alemberg Ang	2011
Enemies of the People	Cambodia	Rob Lemkin, Thet Sambath	2009
Father's Way	Philippines	Zurich Chan	2011
Garuda in My Heart	Indonesia	Ifa Isfansyah	2009
Golden Slumbers	Cambodia	Davy Chou	2011
Hak Aum Lum	Laos	Phanumad Disattha	2012
Help! My Girlfriend is a Vampire!	Malaysia	James Lee	2011
I Carried You Home	Thailand	Tongpong Chantarangkul	2011
In April the Following Year, There Was a Fire	Thailand	Wichanon Somumjarn	2011
It Gets Better	Thailand	Tanwarin Sukkhapisit	2011
Land Beneath the Fog	Indonesia	Shalahuddin Siregar	2011
Mindfulness and Murder	Thailand	Tom Waller	2011
Mother's Soul	Vietnam	Tam Hon Me	2011
Six Degrees of Separation from Lilia Cuntapay	Philippines	Antoinette Jadaone	2011
With or Without Me	Vietnam	Tran Phuong Thao, Swann Dubus	2011
Who Killed Chea Vichea?	Cambodia	Bradley Cox	2010
Postcards from the Zoo	Indonesia	Edwin	2012

=== 2011 ===
Title	Country	Director	Release year
3 Wishes, 3 Loves	Indonesia	Nurman Hakim	2008
At The Horizon	Laos	Anysay Keola	2011
Conspiracy of Silence	Indonesia	Ucu Augustiu	2010
Dark Clouds	Philippines	Joaquin Pedro Valdes	2010
Facing Genocide	Cambodia	David Aronowitsch, Staffan Lindberg	2010
Finding Face	Cambodia	Skye Fitzgerald, Patti Duncan	2010
Floating Lives	Vietnam	Nguyen Phan Quang Binh	2011
Gone Shopping	Singapore	Wee Li Lin	2008
Hexagon	Myanmar	Kyi Soe Tuu	2005
Hiphopdiningrat	Indonesia	Marzuki Mohammad, Quentin Clausin	2010
Invisible City	Singapore	Tan Pin Pin	2007
Khurafat	Malaysia	Syamsul Yusof	2007
Lao Wedding	Laos	Sackchai Deenan	2011
Lumpinee	Thailand	Chira Withaisuthikul	2011
Old Places	Singapore	Royston Tan, Eva Tang, Victric Thng	2010
On Safer Ground	Laos	Stuart Ryan, Hedley Dindoyal	2012
Panya Reanu	Thailand	Bin Bunluerit	2011
Queens of Langkasuka	Thailand	Nonzee Nimibutr	2008
The Rapture of Fe	Philippines	Alvin Yapan	2009
Senior Year	Philippines	Jerrold Tarog	2011
Tabunfire	Thailand	Chalerm Wongping	2006
Ways of the Sea	Philippines	Sheron Dayoc	2010
World Without Shadow	Malaysia	Khoo Eng Yow	2011
Yam Yasothon	Thailand	Petchtai Wongkamlao	2005
Year Without A Summer	Malaysia	Tan Chui Mui	2010

=== 2010 ===
Title	Country	Director	Release year
18 Grams of Love	Singapore	HAN Yew Kwang	2007
881	Singapore	Royston Tan	2007
About My Father	Cambodia	Guillaume P. Suon	2009
Adela	Philippines	Adolfo Alix, Jr.	2008
Adrift	Vietnam	Bui Thac Chuyen	2009
At Stake	Indonesia	Iwan Setiawan, et al	2008
Bombhunters	Cambodia	Skye Fitzgerald	2006
Flower in the Pocket	Malaysia	Liew Seng Tat	2007
Karaoke	Malaysia	Chris Chong Chan Fui	2009
Little Heart	Vietnam	Nguyen Thanh Van	2009
Love for Share	Indonesia	Nia Dinata	2006
The Maid	Singapore	Kelvin Tong	2005
Mukhsin	Malaysia	Yasmin Ahmad	2007
Only Love	Laos	Anousone Sirisackda	2010
Papadom	Malaysia	Afdlin Shauki Aksan	2009
Sabaidee Luang Prabang	Laos	Sackchai Deenan, Anousone Sirisackda	2008
Sabaidee 2: From Pakse With Love	Laos	Sackchai Deenan	2010
Shadows of The Past	Myanmar	Sin Yaw Mg Mg	2009
Talentime	Malaysia	Yasmin Ahmad	2009
Today is Better Than Two Tomorrows	Laos	Anna Rodgers	2009
When The Full Moon Rises	Malaysia	Muhammad Khalid	2008
Wonderful Town	Thailand	Aditya Assarat	2007
The Photograph	Indonesia	Nan T. Achnas	2007

== Awards ==
A notable feature of the festival is its "Talent Lab" for emerging Southeast Asian filmmakers, which is held in collaboration with Tribeca Film Institute. Talent Lab has been active since 2016. At the end of each Talent Lab, a jury selects a winning project to participate in the TFI Network Market.

Additionally, during each Talent Lab, Aurora Media Holdings selects one project to receive a $10,000 cash investment towards the completion of the film. In 2018, Indochina Productions created a "Rising Star" award to be handed out to a participating project.

In 2015, the festival instituted an audience award, which has been active ever since.

Recipients

Year	Talent Lab	Aurora Media Holdings	Audience	Rising Star (Indochina Productions)
2019	Golden	Angkat	N/A	The Lady of the Hills
2018	The Perilous Odyssey to Mount Gulsuk	Siri	N/A	QUAY
2017	Raising A Beast	Cat Island	Redha	N/A
2016	Beastmode	N/A	Cambodian Son	N/A
2015	N/A	N/A	The Cambodian Space Project –– Not Easy Rock'n'Roll	N/A

== See also ==
- Cinema of Laos
