= Cinema of Laos =

Cinema in Laos emerged later than in nearby Vietnam and Cambodia.

== History ==
After colonialism and the civil war, film was not regarded as a priority. Until 1989, the Ministry of Culture's Cinema Department had a monopoly on film production. The first feature-length film produced after the monarchy was abolished is Gun Voice from the Plain of Jars, directed by Somchith Pholsena in 1983, but its release was prevented by censorship. After 1989, several state companies were allowed to operate, but the success was limited. In fact, writing in 1995, Som Ock Southiponh asserted that “Laotian cinema does not exist."

In the 21st century, the government allowed co-productions with foreign companies, which effectively created modern Laotian cinema. In 2008, Sabaidee Luang Prabang (Thai: สะบายดี หลวงพะบาง) was the first commercial film shot in Laos since 1975. It was directed by Thai director Sakchai Deenan together with Anousone Sirisackda, a local Cambodian who had worked for the governmental cinema department. After this experience, Sirisackda felt he was able to direct without foreign support, and in 2010 directed For the Sake of Love (Khophienghak).

Other Laotian directors followed, including Panumas Deesattha with Hak-Am-Lam (2013) and Anysay Kaewla (whose last name is also transliterated as Keola), trained in Thailand, with At the End (Playthang, also titled At the Horizon, 2012). Kaewla's film was described as "a violent thriller that pushed the boundaries of what the Lao government would ultimately tolerate on film." A local critic wrote, "Nightclubs, luxury automobiles, smoking, drinking, men wearing earrings, car chases, and gun violence—that are usually not depicted in Lao media because of strict censorship.” However, after a first draft did not pass censorship, a second draft was accepted, and the movie was successful at the box office.

Documentary co-productions have been successful. The 2017 feature documentary film Blood Road was produced with assistance of the Laos government. Chronicling the journey of an American and Vietnamese mountain biking team traversing over 1,200 miles (1,900 km) on bicycle along the Ho Chi Minh trail to the site where their father, a US Air Force F-4 fighter pilot, was shot down in Laos 40 years earlier. The film would go on to win several awards, most notably a News and Documentary Emmy Award in 2018.

However, the director who made Laotian cinema notable beyond Laos was Mattie Do. She was also Laos' first female director. Born in the United States and trained in Italy, she returned to Laos as part of a relocation deal offered to her husband by a production company. Do made her debut in 2012 with Chanthaly, which was the first horror film written and directed entirely in Laos. Her second film, Dearest Sister (2016) (Lao: ນ້ອງຮັກ) was selected to participate in the 2014 Cannes Film Festival. Do's 2019 film The Long Walk also participated in international festivals.

== Film festivals ==
=== Luang Prabang ===
The Luang Prabang Film Festival (LPFF), is a non-profit organization, founded in 2010, which hosts a yearly film festival in Luang Prabang, Laos. The festival features works solely from ASEAN-member countries. Additionally, the organization supports various educational activities, competitions and small grants for filmmakers from Laos and the greater Southeast Asian region throughout the year.

=== Vientianale ===
Vientianale was a film festival held annually in Vientiane from 2009 to 2018. The festival included a competitive short film section for Lao filmmakers, and hosted screenings of popular international films.

== Notable films ==
- Sabaidee Luang Prabang (2008), by Sakchai Deenan and Anousone Sirisackda
- For the Sake of Love (2010) by Anousone Sirisackda
- At the End (also titled At the Horizon) (2012) by Anysay Keola
- Chanthaly (2012) by Mattie Do
- Hak-Am-Lam (2013) by Panumas Deesattha
- Dearest Sister (2016) by Mattie Do
- The Long Walk (2019) by Mattie Do

== See also ==
- List of Laotian submissions for the Academy Award for Best International Feature Film
- Southeast Asian cinema
- Luang Prabang Film Festival
