= List of Malaysian submissions for the Academy Award for Best International Feature Film =

Best International Feature Film submissions from Malaysia

Highlights
- Debut: 2004
- Submissions: 11
- Nominations: none
- Oscar winners: none

Malaysia is one of more than a hundred countries that have sent films to compete for the Academy Award for Best International Feature Film (Note: The category was previously named the Academy Award for Best Foreign Language Film, but this was changed to the Academy Award for Best International Feature Film in April 2019, after the Academy deemed the word "Foreign" to be outdated.) since 2004. The Academy Award for Best Foreign Language Film is handed out annually by the United States Academy of Motion Picture Arts and Sciences to a feature-length motion picture produced outside the United States that contains primarily non-English dialogue.

As of 2026, Malaysia has submitted eleven films, but none of them were nominated.

== Submissions ==
The Academy of Motion Picture Arts and Sciences has invited the film industries of various countries to submit their best film for the Academy Award for Best International Feature Film since 1956. The International Feature Film Committee oversees the process and reviews all the submitted films. Following this, they vote via secret ballot to determine the five nominees for the award.

Below is a list of the films that have been submitted by Malaysia for review by the Academy for the award by year and the respective Academy Awards ceremony.

Year (Ceremony)	Film title used in nomination	Original title	Language	Director(s)	Result
2004 (77th)	The Princess of Mount Ledang	Puteri Gunung Ledang	Malay, Indonesian	Saw Teong Hin	Not nominated
2012 (85th)	Bunohan		Malay, Kelantan Malay	Dain Said	Not nominated
2015 (88th)	Men Who Save the World	Lelaki Harapan Dunia	Malay	Liew Seng Tat	Not nominated
2016 (89th)	Beautiful Pain	Redha	Malay	Tunku Mona Riza	Not nominated
2019 (92nd)	M for Malaysia		Malay, English	Dian Lee, Ineza Roussille	Not nominated
2020 (93rd)	Roh		Malay	Emir Ezwan	Not nominated
2021 (94th)	Hail, Driver!	Prebet Sapu	Malay	Muzzamer Rahman	Not nominated
2023 (96th)	Tiger Stripes		Malay	Amanda Nell Eu	Not nominated
2024 (97th)	Abang Adik	Abang Adik	Mandarin, Cantonese, Malay	Jin Ong	Not nominated
2025 (98th)	Pavane for an Infant	搖籃凡世	Cantonese, Malay, English	Chong Keat Aun	Not nominated
2026 (99th)	The Fox King	Semusim Lara	Malay	Woo Ming Jin	Pending

== See also ==
- List of Academy Award-winning foreign language films
- List of Academy Award winners and nominees for Best International Feature Film
- List of countries by number of Academy Awards for Best International Feature Film
