= Annick Mahnert =

- Born: 13 July 1975 (age 50); Genève, Switzerland
- Education: New York Film Academy
- Occupations: Curator; film producer
- Years active: 2006–present

Annick Mahnert (born 13 July 1975) is a Swiss film festival curator and film producer. She is the Director of Programming at Fantastic Fest and a programmer at Sitges Film Festival and was named executive director of the Canadian genre industry platform Frontières.

== Early life and education ==
Mahnert studied film production at the New York Film Academy and worked as a production assistant at Roger Corman's Concorde-New Horizons.

== Career ==
Mahnert returned to her native Switzerland, where she worked in distribution and programming at 20th Century Fox, Warner Bros., Pathé Cinémas, and Frenetic Films. She worked at Maximage Filmproduktion as a production assistant.

In 2012, she moved to Paris to join Celluloid Dreams, handling sales and acquisitions. Since 2013, she is working as a freelance producer, acquisitions consultant, and festival programmer and was hired in November 2013 as Foreign Representative for the Market & Festivals department at Swiss Films, the promotion agency for Swiss filmmaking.

Mahnert is a programmer at the Sitges Film Festival and the Strasbourg European Fantastic Film Festival, and Director of Programming at Fantastic Fest in Austin, Texas. In March 2020, Mahnert became the executive director at the Frontières Co-Production Market, an industry initiative for genre film professionals.

She is a consultant for the Zurich Film Foundation, the Cineforom in Geneva, and co-founded the European Genre Forum.

As a producer, she worked on Mattie Do's The Long Walk (producer, 2019), Alexandre O. Philippe's documentaries 78/52: Hitchcock's Shower Scene (producer, 2017), Memory: The Origins of Alien (producer, 2019), Johannes Grenzfurthner's Solvent (executive producer, 2024), and other moves.

In 2022, she was selected as jury member in the "Filmmakers of the Present" competition category at 75th Locarno Film Festival.

Annick Mahnert is a member of the Swiss Film Academy and the European Film Academy.
