= River of Exploding Durians =

- Hanyu Pinyin: 榴梿忘返
- Directed by: Edmund Yeo
- Written by: Edmund Yeo
- Produced by: Woo Ming Jin; Edmund Yeo
- Starring: Zhu Zhi-Ying; Koe Shern; Daphne Low; Joey Leong; Ivan Tai; Jasmine Suraya Chin
- Cinematography: Kong Pahurak
- Edited by: Edmund Yeo
- Music by: Wong Woan Foong
- Production companies: Greenlight Pictures; Indie Works
- Release date: October 24, 2014 (Tokyo International Film Festival)
- Running time: 127 minutes
- Country: Malaysia
- Language: Mandarin

River of Exploding Durians is a 2014 Malaysian drama film directed by Edmund Yeo. It is his first full-length film. It follows the high school students and their history teacher as they fight against the construction of a potentially radioactive rare earth plant. The film had its world premiere at the 2014 Tokyo International Film Festival, where it competed for the main prize.

The film also had its European premiere at the 2015 International Film Festival Rotterdam, under the Bright Future section. In addition, the film had its U.S. premiere at CAAMFest in San Francisco.

== Plot ==
When a rare earth plant is being built near a coastal town, its inhabitants fall into despair, fearful of its radioactive effects. Ming, a high school student, is indifferent towards the changes. All he cares about is spending idyllic afternoons with the childhood friend he secretly loves, Mei Ann.

Meanwhile. Ming's history teacher, Ms. Lim, has started an activist group to protest against the construction. She recruits her favourite student, Hui Ling, to join her. Their idealism is severely tested.

As the construction goes on, they are all drawn into a chain of events that changes their lives irrevocably.

== Cast ==
- Zhu Zhi-Ying as Teacher Lim
- Koe Shern as Ming
- Daphne Low as Hui Ling
- Joey Leong as Mei Ann
- Pearlly Chua as Headmistress Lee
- Mayjune as Sandy
- Azman Hassan as Plant Manager
- Ivan Tai as Guo Xiang
- Kenji Sawahii as Mei Ann's Father
- Kin Wah Chew as Ming's Father (as Chew Kin Wah)

== Awards and nominations ==
Year	Event	Category	Recipient	Result
2014	Tokyo International Film Festival	Tokyo Sakura Grand Prix	River of Exploding Durians	Nominated
