= Kosal Khiev =

Cambodian spoken word artist

- Born: 1980 (age 45–46); Khao-I-Dang, Thailand
- Known for: Poetry

Kosal Khiev is a Cambodian spoken word artist.

== Life ==
Kosal Khiev was born in Khao-I-Dang in 1980. He grew up in Santa Ana, California. At 16, he was involved in a gang shoot-out. He was deported to Cambodia in 2011 after being released from prison. He began experimenting with poetry while in solitary confinement. In Phnom Penh, he met filmmaker Masahiro Sugano, and multimedia artist Anida Yoeu Ali, who made the movie Cambodian Son about Khiev's life.

== Themes ==
Kosal Khiev's work focuses on the transformative power of art and the US justice system among other themes. Khiev represented Cambodia in the London 2012 Cultural Olympiad.
