= Vilouna Phetmany =

Laotian actress

- ວິລູນາ ເພັດມະນີ
- Born: Vientiane, Laos
- Other name: Tot Lina
- Occupations: Actress; model; television personality; singer
- Years active: 2016–
- Known for: portraying Ana in Dearest Sister and Lina in The Long Walk.

Vilouna "Tot Lina" Phetmany (Lao: ວິລູນາ ເພັດມະນີ) is a Laotian actress.

== Biography ==
Phetmany was born to Laotian family and raised in Vientiane, Laos. She began modeling after high school although modeling at the time meant representing Laotian culture and strong values rather than selling clothes. As Laos began to open up to the outside world, she found it difficult to secure bookings as Laotian people preferred light skinned models. She persisted and eventually succeeded in modeling and then as a pop star, TV personality, and actress in commercials. In 2016, she was cast in the lead role in Nong Hak (Lao: ນ້ອງຮັກ) which was released as Dearest Sister in English, directed by Mattie Do. Dearest Sister was selected as the Laotian entry for the Best Foreign Language Film at the 90th Academy Awards, the first time that Laos has submitted a film for consideration in this category. Three years later, she starred in another film produced by Do, Bor Mi Vanh Chark, known in English as The Long Walk

Phetmany is also known by her stage name "Tot Lina."

== Filmography ==
Year	Title	Role	Notes
2016	Dearest Sister	Ana	
2019	The Long Walk	Lina	
2023	The Signal	Madam	
