= Lusca Fantastic Film Fest =

Annual film festival in Puerto Rico

- Location: Guaynabo, Puerto Rico, United States
- Founded: 2006
- Website: http://www.luscafilmfest.com

The Lusca Fantastic Film Fest (formerly Puerto Rico Horror Film Fest) is an annual film festival held in Puerto Rico. It is the first and only international fantastic film festival in the Caribbean devoted to sci-fi, thriller, fantasy, dark humor, bizarre, horror, anime, adventure, virtual reality and animation in short and feature films. The event is held in San Juan, Puerto Rico metropolitan area, and other venues throughout the island of Puerto Rico. It runs for eight days during two weeks during October and November. Its main objective is to promote cinematographic art by presenting high-quality short and feature films.

== History ==
The festival was started in 2006, and took the form of a competitive festival in 2009. It is sponsored by Scene 51, Inc. and the Puerto Rico Film Academy since 2007. In 2011, MovieMaker Magazine commented that the Puerto Rico Horror Film Fest was one of the “13 Horror Film Festivals to Die For.” In 2016 The Puerto Rico Horror Film Festival had a name change to LUSCA Caribbean International Fantastic Film Festival expanding to more film genres and adding anime, adventure, virtual reality and an animation competition. In 2016, the Puerto Rico Horror Film Fest became LUSCA Caribbean International Fantastic Film Fest, retaining it identity in Lusca's Horror selections.[3]

== Prominence ==
The Puerto Rico Horror Film Fest is a point of entry for movies that would otherwise not be shown in Puerto Rico due to the level of specialization of their genre. Since its inception, the Festival has grown in terms of programming, media relevance, and attendance. The festival is attended by over 7,000 people and features an average of over 200 films. It is part of "La Alianza Latinoamericana de Festivales de Cine Fantástico", one of Latin America's main horror film festivals.

== Awards ==
The festival has been the recipient of the following awards.

- Best International Feature Film
- Best International Short Film
- Best International Director
- Best International Animation
- Best VR Project
- International Short Film Audience Award
- Best Local Feature
- Best Local Short
- Best Local Director
- Best Local Animation
- Best Local Actor
- Best Local Actress
- Best Local Screenplay
- Best Local Special Effects
- Best Local Cinematography
- Best Local Editing
- Best Local Sound
- Local Audience Award
- Carlos Madera Excellence Award
- Lifetime Achievement Award
- Cosplay Contest - Jury Award
- Cosplay Contest - People's Choice Award
- Pet Cosplay Contest
- Fantastic Screenwriting Contest
- Special Recognition
- Special Jury Award

== International winners ==
For the complete list of winners visit: Past Editions

Year	Best Intl. Feature Film	Best Intl. Shortfilm	Best Intl. Director	Intl. Audience Award
2009	The Last Gateway (Dir. Demián Rugna)	Remote (Dir. Mark Roussel)		
2011	Krokodyle (Dir. Stefano Bessoni)	Wilt (Dir. Daniel Vogelmann)		
2013	Halley (Dir. Sebastián Hofmann)	Happy B-day (Dir Holger B. Frick)		
2014	Sacrament (Dir. Shawn Ewert)	Subterraneo (Dir. Miguel A. Carmona)		
2015	III (Dir. Pavel Khvaleev)	The Pond (Prod. Mark Wouters & Pieter Smelr)	Isaac Ezban (El Incidente)	
2016	Train to Busan (Dir. Yeon Sang-ho)	The Cleansing Hour (Dir. Damien LeVeck)	Jaco Van Dormael (The Brand New Testament)	The Dream Catcher (Prod. Dave Film School's Students)
2017	Dave Made a Maze (Prod. John Charles Meyer)	Apolo81 (Dir. Diego Luciano)	Lukas Feigelfeld (Hagazussa: A Heathen's Curse)	Hard Way - The Action Musical (Dir. Daniel Vogelmann)
2018	Chimera (Dir. Maurice Haeems)	The Heartbreak Factory (Dir. So Young Shelly S Yo)	Kenji Nagasaki (My Hero Academia: Two Heroes)	Oscar's Bell (Dir. Chris Cronin)
2019	Artik ( Dir. Tom Botchii)	Roberta's Living Room (Dir. Judy K Suh)	Mattie Do ( The Long Walk)	
2020	Meander (Dir. Mathieu Turi)	Moment (Dir. Geoffrey Uloth)	Macoto Tezuka (Tezuka's Barbara)	
2021	Mstitel (Dir. Lucia Klein Svoboda)		Chi Zhang (Annular Eclipse)	Dana (Dir. Lucía Forner Segarra)
2022	Kung Fu Girl (Dir. Devon Downs, Kenny Gage)	Part forever (Dir. Alan Chung-An, Ou)	Yen Kuang Chen (Hideout)	

== Local winners ==
For the complete list of winners visit: Past Editions

Year	Best Local Feature Film	Best Local Shortfilm	Best Local Director	Local Audience Award
2009		Los Unos y los Otros (Dir. Juanchi González)		
2011	Barricada (Dir. Vance McLean Ball & Joe Vargas)	Jessica (Dir. Skip Font)		
2013		Under the Rain (Dir. Salvy Ortíz)		
2014		Los Reyes del Barrio (Dir. Angel Janer)		Deathchaser (Dir. Carlos Martínez & Luis Morales)
2015		Inergía: Sentience Into The Void (Dir. Juan G. Álvarez & Gilberto D. Vázquez)	Gilberto D. Vázquez (Inergía: Sentience Into The Void)	No te Duermas Cabrón (Dir. Yoanna Sánchez)
2016		Cáscara o Semilla (Dir. Jeileen M. Ocasio / Javier E. Delgado)	Javier Enrique Delgado Ruiz & Gilberto David Vázquez Gómez (Cáscara o Semilla)	Lunas Rojas (Dir. Arturo E. Lizardi Rivera)
2017		Lo Innombrable (Dir. Elijah Alicea & C.J. Lozada )	Elijah Alicea & C.J. Lozada (Lo Innombrable)	Alien Hand (Dir. Liz Nieves & Angel G. Nieves) Xanathos (Dir. Wilfred Miranda)
2018		Jaulas Invisibles (Dir. Gilberto D.Vázquez-Gómez)	Gilberto D.Vázquez-Gómez (Jaulas Invisibles)	Apartment 4 (Dir. Angel Janer) Flush (Dir. Gabriel Morales)

== International representation ==
The global film community participates in the Festival, among they are: Argentina, Australia, Brazil, Canada, Chile, Colombia, Costa Rica, Croatia, Cuba, Czech Republic, Dominican Republic, Estonia, Ethiopia, France, Germany, Hong Kong, Iceland, Ireland, Israel, Italy, Japan, Mexico, Morocco, New Zealand, Pakistan, Panama, Peru, Philippines, Portugal, Puerto Rico, Russia, Scotland, Serbia, South Korea, Spain, Sweden, Switzerland, United States of America, United Arab Emirates, United Kingdom, Uruguay, Venezuela.

== Notable celebrities ==
Some of the best known names in the film industry have participated in the PRHFF, including Zelda Rubinstein (Poltergeist) 2009, Tony Todd 2011(Candyman), Tippi Hedren in 2013, and Lloyd Kaufman in 2016, all of them awarded by the festival's Lifetime Achievement Award.

== Past editions ==
- Puerto Rico Horror Film Fest 2007
- Puerto Rico Horror Film Fest 2009
- Puerto Rico Horror Film Fest 2011
- Puerto Rico Horror Film Fest 2013 - Celebrated the 50th anniversary of "The Birds" and had Tippi Hedren as a special guest, honoring her with the Lifetime Achievement Award.
- Puerto Rico Horror Film Fest 2014 - The festival celebrated the 30th Anniversary of A Nightmare on Elm Street and had a special screening of the original film.
- Puerto Rico Horror Film Fest 2015
- Puerto Rico Horror Film Fest 2016
- Lusca Fantastic Film Fest 2017
- Lusca Fantastic Film Fest 2018
