= Woman on Fire Looks for Water =

- Directed by: Woo Ming Jin
- Written by: Woo Ming Jin
- Produced by: Woo Ming Jin; Edmund Yeo
- Starring: Ernest Chong; Chung Kok-keong; Foo Fei Ling; Jerrica Lai
- Cinematography: Wan Chun Hung
- Edited by: Woo Ming Jin
- Music by: Isabel Lam
- Production company: Greenlight Pictures
- Release date: 12 September 2009 (Venice Film Festival)
- Running time: 100 minutes
- Countries: Malaysia; South Korea
- Languages: Mandarin; Korean; Cantonese

Woman on Fire Looks for Water is a 2009 Malaysian-South Korean drama film directed by Woo Ming Jin, starring Ernest Chong, Chung Kok-keong, Foo Fei Ling and Jerrica Lai.

== Cast ==
- Ernest Chong as Ah Fei
- Chung Kok-keong as Ah Kau
- Foo Fei Ling as Lily
- Jerrica Lai as Su Lin

== Reception ==
Darcy Paquet of Screen Daily wrote, "By juxtaposing the stories of the older man, still haunted by decisions he made in his youth, and the son who appears on the verge of making a similar mistake, Woo is able to give added resonance to both stories." Denis Harvey of Variety wrote, "Those looking for emotional fireworks and clear-cut narrative payoffs may be underwhelmed, but pic's subtle charm and frequently ravishing visuals will cast a spell for those who are patient."

Kirk Honeycutt of The Hollywood Reporter wrote that the film "should divide audiences between those appreciative of its quiet rural rhythms and subtle charms and those gazing at watches."
