= The Fox King =

2025 film by Woo Ming Jin

- Malay: Semusim Lara
- Directed by: Woo Ming Jin
- Written by: Woo Ming Jin
- Produced by: Yulia Evina Bhara; Woo Ming Jin; Edmund Yeo; Chua Jing Xuan
- Starring: Dian Sastrowardoyo; Idan Aedan; Hadi Putra; Chew Kin Wah; Amerul Affendi
- Cinematography: Kong Pahurak
- Edited by: Carlo Francisco Manatad; Edmund Yeo
- Music by: Chapavich Temnitikul
- Production companies: Greenlight Pictures; KawanKawan Media; Da Huang Pictures; Sunstrong Entertainment
- Release dates: 9 September 2025 (TIFF); 17 September 2026 (Malaysia)
- Running time: 94 minutes
- Countries: Malaysia; Indonesia
- Languages: Malay; Japanese; Indonesian; English

The Fox King (Malay: Semusim Lara) is a 2025 drama film written and directed by Woo Ming Jin. A co-production of Malaysia and Indonesia, it stars Dian Sastrowardoyo, Idan Aedan, Hadi Putra, Chew Kin Wah, and Amerul Affendi.

The film had its world premiere in the Centrepiece section of the 2025 Toronto International Film Festival on 9 September. It was also selected as the Malaysian entry for the Best International Feature Film at the 99th Academy Awards.

== Plot ==
Fraternal twins Ali and Amir can nearly perfectly predict the positions of bottle caps placed by their sibling while blindfolded. Ali understands and takes care of Amir, who is smart but only speaks using the names of animals. Their father Bubi remarries a younger bride and abandons them at Lonny's fishing business by the beach, where they see a woman burning items.

At school, Ali and Amir are bullied by their classmates led by Edi. Their new English teacher, Lara, is the woman they saw on the beach. After Edi baits Ali into trying to look up her skirt with a mirror, she punishes both after neither confesses; she cans Edi and burns Ali's arm with a lighter. Her strictness as a teacher is in contrast to when she met the brothers on the beach and performed a synchronized swimming routine for them.

The brothers become enamoured with Lara, but Amir grows closer to her as the top student in the class and the only one to read books for extra credit. They learn that she moved back to Malaysia from Toronto where she worked as a journalist, failed to write book, and broke off a relationship. Meanwhile, Bubi returns and gets them to steal durians, especially extra-tasty king fox durians, from a protected area. However, he tells them that they cannot return home because their stepmother thinks they are cursed by their mother's ghost.

Ali becomes jealous of Amir, especially when his meetings with Lara begin to detract from their kite-flying competitions. Before one competition, Ali stalks them to Lara's house, but feels overwhelmed and runs away, managing to win a trophy on his own. He starts fights with Edi for asking about Amir and with his brother for missing the competition. Amir runs away and Ali imagines confessing to Lara. The next day, Ali gets into a fight with Bubi and refuses to participate in his dad's next scam. Bubi then picks up Amir who has just taught Lara how to ride a bike. Bubi's boat sinks while on a smuggling run to Thailand; his body is recovered but Amir's is not.

Edi saves Ali from drowning after trying to swim into the ocean to search for Amir, defends him from classmates, and helps him release his emotions. Amir's jacket is found by one of Lonny's fishing boats and Ali reports Lonny, who had wanted him to take over the business, to police after discovering he was imprisoning the relatives of other workers. After initially being upset at Lara for letting Bubi take Amir, they grow closer and she confides that her one-year old child had died and she feels unfilled in Malaysia. Lara leaves the school to restart her writing career in Berlin.

Five years later, Ali runs a fishing business and receives Lara's finished book. A Japanese man finds his website and sends him a newspaper article about a boy who washed onto a beach on Okinawa Island without any memories. Ali travels to Tokyo to meet Amir at the restaurant where he works, but Amir does not recognize him and is able to speak after treatment by his foster mother. Amir approaches a disheartened Ali outside to discuss his past life and Ali explains the bottle cap game. Ali begins to cry as a blindfolded Amir begins to perfectly replicate his bottle cap positions.

== Cast ==
- Dian Sastrowardoyo as Lara. The film is her first Malaysian film since 2004's Puteri Gunung Ledang.
- Idan Aedan as Ali
- Hadi Putra as Amir, in his debut role.
- Chew Kin Wah as Uncle Lonny
- Amerul Affendi as Bubi
- Sara Mack Lubis as Erna
- Alman Haziq as Edi

== Production ==
Woo, a twin himself, "want[ed] to explore the complexity of the bond between twins, that goes beyond words." It marks the second collaboration between Woo's Greenlight Pictures with Jakarta-based KawanKawan Media, following Stone Turtle (2022).

The project participated at the Tokyo Gap-Financing Market in October 2023, held during the Tokyo International Film Festival. In November 2023, it was also selected to participate at the QCinema Project Market, held during the QCinema International Film Festival.

The film is coproduced by the Malaysian companies Sunstrong Entertainment, Greenlight Pictures, and Da Huang Pictures and Indonesia’s KawanKawan Media, making it one of the first Malaysian-Indonesia co-productions. It also had support from National Film Development Corporation Malaysia. Woo noted that while Indonesia films were often shown in Malaysian, the reverse is not true and helped that The Fox King would buck the trend.

In May 2024, it was reported that principal photography had wrapped.

== Release ==
The Fox King had its world premiere at the 2025 Toronto International Film Festival on 9 September 2025 in the Centrepiece section.

== See also ==
- List of submissions to the 99th Academy Awards for Best International Feature Film
- List of Malaysian submissions for the Academy Award for Best International Feature Film
