= Men Who Save the World =

2014 film

- Theatrical release poster
- Directed by: Liew Seng Tat
- Written by: Liew Seng Tat
- Produced by: Sharon Gan
- Starring: Wan Hanafi Su; Harun Salim Bachik; Soffi Jikan; Jalil Hamid; Azhan Rani
- Cinematography: Teoh Gay Hian
- Edited by: Patrick Minks; Liew Seng Tat
- Music by: Luka Kuncevic
- Distributed by: Everything Films
- Release dates: 11 August 2014 (Locarno Film Festival); 27 November 2014 (Malaysia)
- Running time: 94 minutes
- Countries: Malaysia; Netherlands; Germany; France
- Language: Malay

Men Who Save the World (Malay: Lelaki Harapan Dunia) is a 2014 Malaysian Malay-language comedy-drama film written and directed by Liew Seng Tat. The film was nominated for multiple awards in international film festivals, and won several awards at the 27th Malaysian Film Festival, including Best Picture.

== Cast ==
- Wan Hanafi Su as Pak Awang
- Soffi Jikan as Wan
- Jjamal Ahmed as Mat Kacamata
- Harun Salim Bachik as Megat
- Azhan Rani as Cina
- Muhammad Farhan Mohamad Nizam as Zakari
- Hazeehan Husain as the Headman's Wife
- Othman Hafsham as Encik Juta Seri
- Jalil Hamid as Tok Bilal
- Azman Hassan as Khamis
- Khalid Mboyelwa Hussein as Solomon
- Bob Idris as Mat Lembu
- Hishamuddin Rais as the Tok Bomoh
- Pitt Hanif as Sharman's Intern

== Production ==
Liew developed Lelaki Harapan Dunia at the Cannes Director's Residence – Cinéfondation and participated at the 2011 Sundance Screenwriters Lab. The film was shot in Kuala Kangsar, Perak. Lelaki Harapan Dunia was supposed to be Liew's debut feature film but he ended up shelving it and making Flower in the Pocket first. The critical success of Liew's debut paved the way for him to receive grants from all over the world for Lelaki Harapan Dunia.

The film is produced by Sharon Gan and is a co-production project between Everything Films Sdn. Bhd. (Malaysia) and Volya Films (The Netherlands), Flying Moon Filmproduktion (Germany) and Mandra Films (France) with support from Ministry of Information, Communication and Culture (Malaysia), TorinoFilmLab (Italy), Hubert Bals Fund (The Netherlands), Netherlands Film Fund, World Cinema Fund (Germany), Visions Sud Est (Switzerland), Fondation Groupama Gan pour le Cinéma – Cinefondation (France), Prince Claus (The Netherlands), Sundance Institute Mahindra Global Filmmaking Award, Sundance Institute Feature Film Program and the Doris Duke Foundation (USA).

== Release ==
The film had its world premiere at the 67th Locarno International Film Festival on 6 August 2014. Its North American premier was held at the 2014 Toronto International Film Festival on 4 September 2014. The film was released in Malaysia on 27 November 2014.

== Critical reception ==
The film got mixed reviews with praise for the humour and stunning cinematography. Critics were also more focused on the issue of the absence of actresses, homosexuality and racism that exists in this film. Kamran Ahmed of entertainment portal Nextprojection.com in describing the film," It’s an extreme and exaggerated form of humour that works well to make certain ironic or sardonic remarks...". Shelly Kraicer of film portal Cinema-scope.com reviewed this film as "... sets out to be a boisterous comedy of rural cross-dressing and ghostly hauntings, but it has fascinating, somewhat disguised undercurrents suggesting something more serious." Jenna Hossack of dorkshelf.com entertainment portal also provides two words to describe this film, namely "Vibrant and funny". Shane Scott-Travis of entertainment portal vivascene.com give 4 out of 5 stars for this movie. Muzaffar Mustafa from Astro Awani also praised "... among the best films of in aspects of production, both in terms of art direction and cinematography." Irvan Syed Syed Mahdi of Utusan Malaysia praised the film directing and cinematography. Hassan Abd Al-Muttalib from the same newspaper also commented of the film being " a continuation of the early Malaysian cinema". K. Anand of the news portal The Malaysian Insider loomed on the film as "the best local film this year and among the best films of the decade."

Jay Weissberg of Variety criticised the film for playing with issues of homosexuality and racism. "This ultra-light comedy about an apparently haunted house in the jungle is loaded with racially problematic scenes and homophobic gags, plus barely one line is uttered by the marginalized female characters." he stated. Justin Lowe of The Hollywood Reporter stated, "From ridiculing superstitious villagers to stereotyping Africans and completely sidelining women, Liew’s film barrels ahead with barely a clue. His puerile script leads the well-known Malaysian cast members pointlessly astray and returns little on the clearly significant effort required to move the house and shoot extensive footage in the depths of the jungle." Mark Adams of Screen Daily questioned the absence of actresses in this film. Nazim Masnawi of news portal Malaysiakini observes the film imitating the style of Mamat Khalid's early films but whereas Mamat "still gives sympathy to his character line-up", Liew is "really brutal with his satire". Aidil Rusli of The Star notes of this movie as being filled with potential yet that can not be translated properly.

== Accolades ==
Lelaki Harapan Dunia swept five awards among other fourteen categories nominated including the prestigious Best Picture and Best Director awards in 27th Malaysian Film Festival.

The film was selected as the Malaysian entry for the Best Foreign Language Film at the 88th Academy Awards but it was not nominated.

Award	Category	Recipients and nominees	Result
2014 Toronto International Film Festival	Contemporary World Cinema & Grolsch Audience Selection Award	Sharon Gan	Nominated
33rd Vancouver International Film Festival	Dragons & Tigers	Sharon Gan	Nominated
19th Busan International Film Festival	A Window On Asian Cinema	Sharon Gan	Nominated
67th Locarno International Film Festival	Concorso Cineasti del Presente	Sharon Gan	Nominated
25th Singapore International Film Festival	Asian Feature Film	Sharon Gan	Nominated
3rd Nara International Film Festival	Main Competition	Sharon Gan	Nominated
Golden Horse Film Festival and Awards 2014	Asian Window	Sharon Gan	Nominated
Kolkata International Film Festival	Asian Select (NETPAC Award)	Sharon Gan	Nominated
2015 International Film Festival Rotterdam	Bright Future	Sharon Gan	Nominated
2015 Göteborg International Film Festival	Den gudomliga komedin	Sharon Gan	Nominated
27th Malaysian Film Festival (FFM)	Best Picture	Everythings Film Sdn Bhd	Won
27th Malaysian Film Festival (FFM)	Best Director	Liew Seng Tat	Won
27th Malaysian Film Festival (FFM)	Best Actor	Wan Hanafi Su	Nominated
27th Malaysian Film Festival (FFM)	Best Screenplay	Liew Seng Tat	Nominated
27th Malaysian Film Festival (FFM)	Best Story	Liew Seng Tat	Won
27th Malaysian Film Festival (FFM)	Best Cinematography	Teoh Gay Hian	Nominated
27th Malaysian Film Festival (FFM)	Best Editing	Liew Seng Tat	Nominated
27th Malaysian Film Festival (FFM)	Best Sound Editing	Imaginax Studios	Won
27th Malaysian Film Festival (FFM)	Best Art Editing	Tunku Mohd Taufek	Nominated
27th Malaysian Film Festival (FFM)	Best Original Score	Imaginax Studios	Nominated
27th Malaysian Film Festival (FFM)	Best Costume Design	Tunku Mohd Taufek	Nominated
27th Malaysian Film Festival (FFM)	Best Child Actor	Raykarl Iskandar	Won
27th Malaysian Film Festival (FFM)	Best Child Actor	Muhammad Farhan	Nominated
Kuala Lumpur Film Critics Society Awards 2015	Best Picture	Everythings Film Sdn Bhd	Won
Kuala Lumpur Film Critics Society Awards 2015	Best Director	Liew Seng Tat	Won
Kuala Lumpur Film Critics Society Awards 2015	Best Actor	Wan Hanafi Su	Won
Kuala Lumpur Film Critics Society Awards 2015	Best Screenplay	Liew Seng Tat	Won
Kuala Lumpur Film Critics Society Awards 2015	Best Cinematography	Teoh Gay Hian	Won

== See also ==
- List of submissions to the 88th Academy Awards for Best Foreign Language Film
- List of Malaysian submissions for the Academy Award for Best Foreign Language Film
