= Daan Veldhuizen =

Dutch filmmaker (born 1982)

- Born: Daan Veldhuizen; 1982 (age 43–44); Bussum, Netherlands
- Occupation: Filmmaker
- Years active: 2007–present
- Website: http://www.daanveldhuizen.com

Daan Veldhuizen (born 1982), is a Dutch director, editor and cinematographer. He is best known as the director of the critically acclaimed documentaries Stories from Lakka Beach, Banana Pancakes and the Children of Sticky Rice and Laos - Alles hat seinen Preis.

== Personal life ==
He was born in 1982 in Bussum, Netherlands.

== Career ==
He holds a degree in audiovisual arts from the Willem de Kooning Academy in Rotterdam. During his studies, he simultaneously started working in the field as a director, cinematographer and editor. After his initial focus on fiction narratives he eventually directed his attention to documentary filmmaking.

In 2011, he released his first feature documentary Stories from Lakka Beach about a forgotten beach resort town in war torn Sierra Leone. He produced, directed, filmed and edited the film. The documentary received critical acclaim, was nominated at IDFA for Best Dutch Documentary and was aired nationwide by PBS in the US.

His second documentary Banana Pancakes and the Children of Sticky Rice is set in Laos. The documentary looks at tourism from a cleverly balanced perspective: as backpackers visit a small village in remote northern Laos, the inhabitants of the village discover the attractions of the West. They find themselves on a crossroad of their respective desires. The documentary premiered at IFFR and was theatrically released in The Netherlands, Germany and Switzerland. ARTE broadcast the film under the alternative name Laos, alles hat seinen preis.

For the acclaimed future affairs series VPRO backlight, he directed the episodes Invasion of the Drones, The End of Cheap Nature, Human in Command and Surviving Chaos.

== Filmography ==
Year	Film	Role	Genre	Ref.
2007	Versus	Director, producer, editor, writer	Short film	
2009	Tini Tinou	Director, producer, editor, writer	Documentary short	
2011	Stories from Lakka Beach	Director, producer, editor, writer, cinematographer	Documentary	
2015	Banana Pancakes and the Children of Sticky Rice	Director, editor, writer, cinematographer, visual effects	Documentary	
2015	Laos - Alles hat seinen Preis	Director, editor, writer, cinematographer	TV movie documentary	
2015	The Alphabet of Fear	Editor	Documentary	
2016	Song of Exile	Editor	Documentary	
2016	The Passing Years	Editor	Documentary	
2016	Buba & Sharon	Cinematographer	Documentary short	
2016–19	VPRO Backlight	Director, editor, writer, cinematographer	TV series documentary	
2018	Loss won't pay the bills	Editor	Documentary	

== See also ==
- Luang Prabang Film Festival
