= Cambodian Son =

- Directed by: Masahiro Sugano
- Produced by: Anida Yoeu Ali, Masahiro Sugano
- Starring: Kosal Khiev
- Edited by: Masahiro Sugano
- Music by: Thomas Parisch, Laurent Ziliani
- Production company: Studio Revolt
- Release date: 2014
- Running time: 90 minutes
- Country: Cambodia
- Language: english

Cambodian Son is a 2014 documentary film about the journey of Kosal Khiev from prisoner in America to a world-class poet in Cambodia.

The documentary follows Kosal's life after receiving the most important performance invitation of his career—to represent the Kingdom of Cambodia at the London 2012 Cultural Olympiad. Kosal would travel to London having only taken two flights prior; first, as a one-year-old refugee child whose family fled Cambodia and then as a 32-year-old criminal "alien" forcibly returned to Cambodia in 2011. This documentary follows a volatile yet charming and talented young man who struggles to find his footing amongst a new freedom that was granted only through his deportation.

The film traces the impact and significance of this moment for Kosal, his friends, family, mentors and a growing international fan base. Armed only with memorized verses, he must face the challenges of being a deportee while navigating his new fame as Phnom Penh’s premiere poet.

The local buzz and excitement increases as Kosal’s friends begin to pull together a send off party fit for a king. As the pressure to perform and represent builds, Kosal begins to deteriorate. A dramatic series of events nearly prohibits him from ever stepping onto the London stage. From teaching literacy at a Cambodian dumpsite to performing at the London 2012 Cultural Olympiad, Kosal soon realizes with his new freedom comes great responsibility.

After the performances end and the London stage becomes a faint memory, Kosal is once again left alone to answer the central question in his life: "How do you survive when you belong nowhere?"

== Reception ==
One reviewer said that the film is, "a compelling, thought-provoking documentary that raises important questions about the power of art to change lives and the power of the current immigration laws to ruin them."
