= Roh (film) =

2019 Malaysian Malay-language horror film

Roh (Soul)
- Promotional release poster
- Directed by: Emir Ezwan
- Starring: Farah Ahmad; Mhia Farhana; Harith Haziq; Namron; June Lojong; Putri Qaseh
- Cinematography: Saifuddin Musa
- Music by: Reinchez Ng
- Production company: Kuman Pictures
- Distributed by: TGV Pictures; Netflix
- Release dates: November 22, 2019 (Singapore International Film Festival); August 6, 2020 (Malaysia, Singapore); June 1, 2021 (Worldwide); October 21, 2021 (United States)
- Running time: 83 minutes
- Country: Malaysia
- Language: Malay
- Budget: MYR 360,000

Roh, or known as Soul, is a 2019 Malaysian Malay-language independent folk horror film directed by Emir Ezwan in his directorial debut. Set in the past, a family living in a forest is visited by a strange little girl, who comes with a frightening prediction.

Roh was produced by Malaysian production house Kuman Pictures, and filmed on location in Dengkil. It was released theatrically on 6 August 2020 in Malaysia and Singapore, and internationally on Netflix in 2021. It was selected as the Malaysian entry for the Best International Feature Film at the 93rd Academy Awards, but it was not nominated. At the 31st Malaysia Film Festival, Roh won six awards, including Best Film.

The film received critical acclaim internationally, with reviewers praising its symbolism, cinematography and incorporation of Malay folklore. Some outlets also highlighted Roh as a standout in Malaysian cinema and part of a new wave of low-budget folk horror films from Southeast Asia.

== Plot ==
In the past, two children, Along and Angah, live in a ramshackle shed in the forest with their widowed mother, Mak. One day, they discover a dead deer hanging by its neck caught between branches high off the ground. On their way home, they see a young girl who starts following them. They take her in and call her Adik for little sister. Mak tells them a legend about a restless forest spirit that is cursed to endlessly hunt animals and children but victims can save themselves by knocking two rocks together and chanting a mantra. The next morning, the family wakes to see Adik eating raw birds. She tells them that they will all be dead by the next full moon before slitting her own throat.

The family leaves Adik's body in a clearing in the forest. They return home to find an old lady who calls herself Tok looking at rocks that mysteriously appeared around the house the night before. Tok tells them the rocks are a bad omen and makes the children discard them. That night, Along encounters a specter that looks like Adik in the crawl space under their house. She develops a high fever and Mak goes to Tok for help. Tok conducts a ritual and instructs Angah to sacrifice two white pigeons but the boy secretly lets one of the birds go free.

A hunter shows up at the house looking for Adik but Mak turns him away. That night, Along sleepwalks and wakes to find herself at Adik's gravesite where she again encounters the apparition. The next day, the hunter finds a terrified Along in the forest and returns her to Mak, who is suspicious that he had abducted the girl and harmed her. An agitated Along tells the hunter about Adik and then urges Mak to move out of the forest. The hunter, who is Adik's father, finds her body and grieves. While her mother is out of the house, Along slams her head repeatedly into a sharp metal protrusion on the floor and dies.

Now truly fearful, Mak prepares to leave the forest with Angah but the boy wanders off in search of food. The hunter finds that Adik's body has gone missing. He goes to Mak to warn her that she and her family are in danger from evil forces. She refuses to believe him and accuses him of causing Along's death and Angah's disappearance. After he leaves, Mak follows him with the intention of killing the hunter. In the forest, the hunter finds Angah and slits his throat before he himself is run through with a spear by Mak who has crept up behind him.

The hunter wakes to find Tok performing a ritual over Adik's body which is buried in a shallow grave. She reveals that she is an iblis that exists by possessing humans to gain control of their souls. Tok is using Adik's body to carry out her evil deeds. The iblis taunts the hunter that he has not managed to save Angah from his fate. The children's spirits are seen roaming the forest. The film ends with Along burning down the family home with her mother, weakened by loss of blood from slit wrists, and dead brother inside it.

== Cast ==
- Farah Ahmad as Mak (Mother)
- Mhia Farhana as Along (Daughter)
- Harith Haziq as Angah (Son)
- Namron as Pemburu (The Hunter)
- June Lojong as Tok (Old Lady)
- Putri Qaseh as Adik (The Young Girl)

== Production ==
Roh was filmed over two weeks in a forest in Dengkil, south of Kuala Lumpur. It had a budget of RM360,000 ($88,500). It is the second film produced by Malaysian production house Kuman Pictures, following Two Sisters, and Emir Ezwan's directorial debut.

The film incorporates elements of Malay folklore, Islamic beliefs and black magic.

== Release ==
The film had its world premiere at the Singapore International Film Festival and Indonesia Jogja-NETPAC Asian Film Festival in November 2019.

It had a theatrical release in Singapore and Malaysia in August 2020, but the reintroduction of the Movement Control Order during the COVID-19 pandemic later closed cinemas and disrupted local distribution.

It was released on Netflix worldwide on June 1, 2021 and on October 29, 2021, in the United States.

== Reception ==
=== Critical reception ===
Roh received positive reviews internationally. On the review aggregator website Rotten Tomatoes, 89% of 9 critics' reviews are positive.

The New York Times gave the film a positive review, saying it "succeeds as a spine-tingling baffler, hitting at nerves we can’t quite articulate but feel all the same." A review in Variety was also positive, commending its "eerie, poetical simplicity". NME called it a "high point in Southeast Asian horror" that does "a fantastic job of crafting ominous imagery from the film’s natural surroundings". Both NME and Variety singled out Roh's cinematography, score and symbolism for praise. The Boston Herald gave it an overall rating of A− and compared it to the work of Ari Aster.

Al Jazeera highlighted Roh as an example of a new wave of low-budget Southeast Asian folk horror films bringing international attention to the region's film industry, along with Belaban Hidup (2021) and the work of Indonesian directors Joko Anwar and Timo Tjahjanto. NME similarly suggested the film "announces newcomer Emir Ezwan as one of Southeast Asia’s premier genre filmmakers, standing alongside the likes of Indonesia’s Joko Anwar and the Philippines’ Mikhail Red."

British director Edgar Wright praised the film on Twitter, calling it "amazing".

=== Accolades ===
Roh won six awards at the 31st Malaysia Film Festival in 2021, including Best Film, making it the biggest winner of the festival.

Award	Recipient / Nominated Work	Award	Result	Ref
31st Malaysia Film Festival	Roh	Best Film	Won	
31st Malaysia Film Festival	Tengku Syahmi	Best Fashion Design	Won	
31st Malaysia Film Festival	Emir Ezwan	Best Screenplay	Won	
31st Malaysia Film Festival	Junainah M. Lojong	Best Supporting Actress	Won	
31st Malaysia Film Festival	Reinchez Ng	Best Music Score	Won	
31st Malaysia Film Festival	Putri Qaseh	Best Child Actress	Won	

== See also ==
- List of submissions to the 93rd Academy Awards for Best International Feature Film
- List of Malaysian submissions for the Academy Award for Best International Feature Film
