= M for Malaysia =

2019 Malaysian documentary film

- Directed by: Dian Lee; Ineza Roussile
- Produced by: Dian Lee (executive); Marina Mahathir (executive); Nazreen Hara Raj (coordinating); Ineza Roussille (co-producer); Ruby Yang (creative)
- Starring: See below
- Edited by: Sebastian Ng
- Music by: Rendra Zawawi
- Production company: Project M Media
- Distributed by: Astro Shaw
- Release date: 12 September 2019
- Running time: 92 minutes
- Country: Malaysia
- Languages: Malay; English

M for Malaysia is a 2019 Malaysian documentary film directed by Dian Lee and Ineza Rousille. It documents the 2018 Malaysian general election. It is released on 12 September 2019 in Malaysia. It was selected as the Malaysian entry for the Best International Feature Film at the 92nd Academy Awards, but it was not nominated.

== Synopsis ==
The film documents the 14th general elections (GE14) in May 2018, from campaigning to election night, which saw historic moments as Pakatan Harapan took over the government and Mahathir Mohamad becoming prime minister for the second time.

The film touches on the corruption of Najib Razak; Mahathir Mohamad's personal life and family. It features interviews of several politicians including Wan Azizah and Lim Guan Eng.

== Cast ==
- Mahathir Mohamad
- Siti Hasmah
- Wan Azizah Wan Ismail
- Ineza Roussille
- Tony Pua
- Liew Chin Tong
- Ambiga Sreenevasan
- Clare Rewcastle Brown
- Maria Chin Abdullah
- Shafie Apdal
- Rafidah Aziz
- Fahmi Fadzil
- Syed Saddiq Syed Abdul Rahman
- Wan Saiful Wan Jan
- Ibrahim Suffian
- Karim Raslan
- Tengku Elida Bustaman
- Joe Lee

== Production ==
The film is the directorial debut of Dian Lee and Ineza Rousille. One of the directors, Ineza Roussille is Mahathir Mohamad's granddaughter.

== Release and reception ==
M for Malaysia was released on September 12, 2019 in Malaysia. Prior to its Malaysian theatrical release, the film was screened at the CAAM Festival 2019 in San Francisco and DocEdge Film Festival 2019 in New Zealand and will be screened at the Busan International Film Festival (BIFF) in October.

In critic reviews, Lowyat.net states that the film is mostly without bias and not a propaganda film.

== See also ==
- List of submissions to the 92nd Academy Awards for Best International Feature Film
- List of Malaysian submissions for the Academy Award for Best International Feature Film
