= Still I Strive =

Still I Strive is a 2012 hybrid, documentary film directed by Adam Pfleghaar, A. Todd Smith, and produced by Jim Lee for Pioneer Cinema Institute.

== Reception ==
On Metacritic the film received 81 out of 100 based on reviews from 4 critics. At Rotten Tomatoes it received 3 positive reviews from critics. The New York Times called it, "a remarkable find, a tale of uplift in a too-little-seen environment." The Village Voice called it, "an epic tale...The directors elevate the picture to a level of emotional genius by filming the children’s play as a full-on cinematic adaptation...the thresholds and crises of both dovetailing into a brilliant, emotionally coherent whole....Astonishing." The Hollywood Reporter called it, "thrilling....gorgeous....a marvelously imaginative conceit that transforms documentary into the realm of art." Variety called it, "a winning debut....elegantly lensed....The power of performing arts to restore hope to damaged young lives is marvelously captured." Film Journal International called it "Compelling...Breathtaking...a triumph."
