= Beautiful Pain (film) =

2016 film

Beautiful Pain Redha
- Film poster
- Directed by: Tunku Mona Riza
- Written by: Tunku Mona Riza; Azril Hamzah
- Produced by: Haris Sulong
- Starring: Harith Haziq
- Cinematography: Yudi Datau
- Edited by: Isazaly Mohamed Isa
- Music by: Monoloque
- Release date: 30 April 2016
- Country: Malaysia
- Language: Malay

Beautiful Pain (Malay: Redha) is a 2016 Malaysian drama film directed by Tunku Mona Riza. It was selected as the Malaysian entry for the Best Foreign Language Film at the 89th Academy Awards but it was not nominated.

== Premise ==
This film tells the story of an autistic Malaysian boy named Danial. Upon discovering he has autism, his mother Alina goes on a journey from Terengganu to Kuala Lumpur to find out more information about autism and give her son his needed help and support. Tragically, Alina dies from an accidental fall at home, so Danial's father Razlan is left on his own to raise Danial. Although in denial about Danial having autism at first, Razlan becomes more accepting of Danial's condition and strives to support him every step of the way.

== Cast ==
- Harith Haziq as Danial
- Remy Ishak as Azim
- June Lojong as Alina
- Namron as Razlan
- Nadiya Nissa as Shasha
- Zahiril Adzim as Faizal
- Ruminah Sidek as Mak Jah
- Izzy Reef as Teen Daniel
- Susan Lankester as Katrina
- Angeline Tan as Pek Yoke
- Susan Manen as Waty
- Anne Abdullah as Norain
- Marissa Yasmin as Soraya
- Kismah Johar as Mak Faizal
- Tania Zainal as Doctor
- Nurul Azia binti Azmi as Siti
- Abdul Mubin bin Ismail as Asang

== See also ==
- List of submissions to the 89th Academy Awards for Best Foreign Language Film
- List of Malaysian submissions for the Academy Award for Best Foreign Language Film
