= Nontawat Numbenchapol =

Thai documentary director and cinematographer

- นนทวัฒน์ นำเบญจพล
- Born: 2 May 1983 (age 43); Bangkok, Thailand
- Education: Visual Communication Design Rangsit University
- Occupations: Film director; screenwriter; producer
- Website: Official website

Nontawat Numbenchapol (Thai : นนทวัฒน์ นำเบญจพล; born May 2, 1983) is a Thai documentary film director and cinematographer. After graduating from the Visual Communication Design Department, Faculty of Art and Design, Rangsit University, Numbenchapol has pursued his career as a filmmaker. His notable works include Boundary (ฟ้าต่ำแผ่นดินสูง) and By the River (สายน้ำติดเชื้อ).

== Filmography ==
Year	English Title	Thai Title	Awards/Accolades
2013	Boundary	ฟ้าต่ำแผ่นดินสูง	– Premiered at 63rd Berlin International Film Festival – Young Filmmaker award, Bangkok Critics Assembly
2013	By the River	สายน้ำติดเชื้อ	– Premiered at 66th Locarno International Film Festival – Special Mention Award, Locarno International Film Festival

=== Boundary (ฟ้าต่ำแผ่นดินสูง : Fahtum Pandinsoong) ===
In 2013, after Numbenchapol's debut documentary feature Boundary (ฟ้าต่ำแผ่นดินสูง) that examines the border dispute between Thailand and Cambodia was premiered at 63rd Berlin International Film Festival, it had been banned by Thai ministry of culture as "a treat to national security and international relations" despite the fact that rating system has been enforced under the Motion Pictures and Video Act B.E. 2551 (2008). However, the committee later reversed their decision on condition that some dialogue must be muted. Boundary was later rated 18+ and was self-distributed by the director at limited cinemas in Chiang Mai, Khon Kaen, Udon Thani and Bangkok respectively, from June 27 – July 21, 2013.

Boundary was inspired in part by Numbenchapol's desire to learn the truth behind the 2010 Thai political protests. The film was screened at numerous festivals such as Milano Film Festival in Italy, Yamagata International Documentary Film Festival in Japan, and Human Right Dignity International Film Festival in Myanmar. Numbenchapol also received Young Filmmaker award from 22nd Bangkok Critics Assembly from this feature.

=== By the River (สายน้ำติดเชื้อ : Sai Nam Tid Shoer) ===
Numbenchapol's second documentary feature By the River (สายน้ำติดเชื้อ) premiered at the 66th Locarno International Film Festival and received Special Mention Award in August 2013. The film deals with another controversial issue in Thailand: the 15-year-suffering of Karen villagers from the lead contaminated river at Lower Klity in Kanchanaburi province.

By the River received praises from many renowned events, for example, Hong Kong Asian Film Festival, Festival dei popoli in Italy and World Film Festival of Bangkok in Thailand, and was officially released in Thailand on May 8, 2014.

== Other works ==
=== Still photographer ===
- Uncle Boonmee Who Can Recall His Past Lives (Apichatpong Weerasethakul, 2010)
- Ha Phraeng (ห้าแพร่ง) – segment "Novice" (Paween Purikitpanya, 2009)

=== Exhibition ===
- DIG (2012, Solo exhibition, Messy, Bangkok)
- Ratchapruek (2012, Group exhibition, Menam Art Fleuve, France)
- Aurora Primary (2012, Award: Film On The Rocks Untamed winner)
- Gaze & Hear (2011)
