= Chanthaly =

- Theatrical release poster
- Directed by: Mattie Do
- Screenplay by: Christopher Larsen
- Produced by: Mattie Do; Christopher Larsen; Douangmany Soliphanh
- Starring: Amphaiphun Phimmapunya; Douangmany Soliphanh; Soukchinda Duangkhamchan; Khouan Souliyabapha; Soulasath Souvanavong; Mango
- Cinematography: Christopher Larsen
- Edited by: Christopher Larsen
- Release dates: December 2012 (Luang Prabang Film Festival); May 18, 2013 (Laos); September 22, 2013 (Austin Fantastic Fest)
- Running time: 98 minutes
- Country: Laos
- Language: Lao

Chanthaly (Lao: ຈັນທະລີ) is a 2012 Lao horror film directed by Mattie Do and written by Christopher Larsen. It is the first horror film to be written and directed entirely in Laos and the first Lao feature film directed by a woman. Chanthaly was screened at the 2012 Luang Prabang Film Festival and the 2013 Fantastic Fest. Pop singer Amphaiphun Phimmapunya stars as Chanthaly, alongside Douangmany Soliphanh and Soukchinda Duangkhamchan.

== Plot ==
Chanthaly is being raised alone by her overprotective father, sequestered in their home in Vientiane. She suspects that her dead mother's ghost is trying to deliver a message to her from the afterlife. After a change in the medication treating her hereditary heart condition causes the hallucinations to cease, Chanthaly must decide whether or not to risk succumbing to her terminal illness to hear her mother's last words.

== Cast ==
- Amphaiphun Phimmapunya as Chanthaly
- Douangmany Soliphanh as Father
- Soukchinda Duangkhamchan as Thong
- Khouan Souliyabapha as Bee
- Soulasath Souvanavong as Keovisit
- Mango as Moo

== Production ==
The entire film was shot at director Mattie Do's house in Vientiane, Laos.

== Entering into public domain and "open sourcing" ==
During a crowd funding campaign for Do's second feature film Dearest Sister, Do and Larsen, who are the sole owner of the copyright, offered to enter the film into the public domain if a US$30,000 goal was reached. After reaching the goal, in addition to releasing the copyright, all raw footage and other production material was made available through the Internet Archive and the torrent site EZTV, thus "open sourcing" the entire project.

Do put forth a "community challenge", inviting fans to re-edit the film using the material.
