= Dearest Sister =

- Theatrical release poster
- Directed by: Mattie Do
- Written by: Christopher Larsen
- Starring: Amphaiphun Phimmapunya; Vilouna Phetmany; Tambet Tuisk; Manivanh Boulom; Yannawoutthi Chanthalungsy; Maluly Chanthalangsy; Brandon Hashimoto; Naliphone Siviengxay; Douangmany Soliphanh; Mango
- Release dates: 25 September 2016 (Fantastic Fest); 11 May 2017 (Laos)
- Countries: Laos; France; Estonia
- Languages: Lao; Estonian; Thai

Dearest Sister (Lao: ນ້ອງຮັກ) is a 2016 Lao horror film that was released in the US on September 25, 2016 and Laos on May 11, 2017. It is the second feature film directed by Mattie Do. It was selected as the Laotian entry for the Best Foreign Language Film at the 90th Academy Awards, the first time that Laos has submitted a film for consideration in this category, but it was not nominated.

The film is about a Lao village girl who travels to Vientiane to care for her rich cousin who has mysteriously lost her sight, and somehow gained the ability to communicate with the dead. Matters are further driven by the cousin’s ambivalent marriage with an Estonian white migrant, who has his own dark secrets to hide. Do has cited the 19th century ballet La Bayadère as a source of inspiration for the film.

== Plot ==
Nok is a naive village girl who travels to Vientiane to take care of her cousin Ana, made wealthy from her marriage to a foreigner, who is suddenly ill.

Jakob has asked Nok to come since Ana has been struck by a mysterious illness which not only blurs her vision but enables her to see the recently dead. After one of her visions Ana recites numbers, numbers which she can't remember but which Nok uses to play the lottery. She wins and buys a new phone. After the mother of one of the supermarket venders has a stroke, Ana has another vision and Nok once again wins the lottery, only to have her winnings stolen by Ana's servants who threaten to tell Ana that Nok has been stealing from her. Meanwhile Ana and Nok become close and Ana begins to treat her more as a friend, calling her little sister and buying her clothes.

Ana has a vision that her mother has died and collapses on the floor chanting numbers. When she calls her mother she is fine, but she dies a few hours later after being the victim of a hit and run. After hearing that Ana predicted her mother's death before reciting numbers Ana's father correctly guesses that the numbers were related to the lottery. However Nok gives Ana's father the incorrect number and pockets the winnings for herself. Shortly after Ana receives a phone call from Nok's parents complaining that they have not been receiving any money from Nok. Nok admits that she spent the money on herself and that the numbers Ana had been reciting were correct lottery numbers causing a rift between the two.

Ana goes to Thailand to have an operation to "correct" her vision. While she and Jakob are away the servants hold a drunken revelry destroying the house. Upon their return Ana and Jakob fire the servants and Jakob leaves Ana in Nok's care while he goes to attend to his failing business.

Ana is essentially blind upon her return since her eyes are bandaged and must be cleaned and kept covered for a week. Nok refuses to tend to Ana and begins starving her and rearranging the furniture so she cannot get around. Ana manages to steal Nok's cellphone and lock her in the washroom while she calls Jakob begging for his help. Shortly after she has a vision where he "appears" to her only to disappear and cause her to recite more numbers which Nok overhears from the bathroom.

Jakob arrives at the compound intending to rescue Ana but is struck in the head by the servants who are angry about being fired and have returned to steal what they can. They lock Ana and a slowly dying Jakob in the washroom with Nok.

In the washroom Nok complains about the way Ana treated her while Ana claims that she was always kind to Nok. Taking her bandages off, Ana has a final vision of both her and Nok both of them fatally injured. Nok, gathering up a knife asks Ana what she is looking at, while Ana, picking up a blade, answers "Nothing."

== Cast ==
The film stars Estonian actor Tambet Tuisk (The Poll Diaries, December Heat), Lao music and radio personality Vilouna Phetmany, and Amphaiphun Phommapanya, the lead from Do's directorial debut Chanthaly.

== Funding ==
An Indiegogo campaign collected 40,141 USD by July 2, 2014, raising 134% of the targeted 30,000 USD. The film had its world premiere at Fantastic Fest in Austin in September 2016 as well as at the Lund International Fantastic Film Festival in October 2016 in Sweden.

== See also ==
- List of submissions to the 90th Academy Awards for Best Foreign Language Film
- List of Laotian submissions for the Academy Award for Best Foreign Language Film
