= Edmund Yeo =

Singaporean-born Malaysian filmmaker (born 1984)

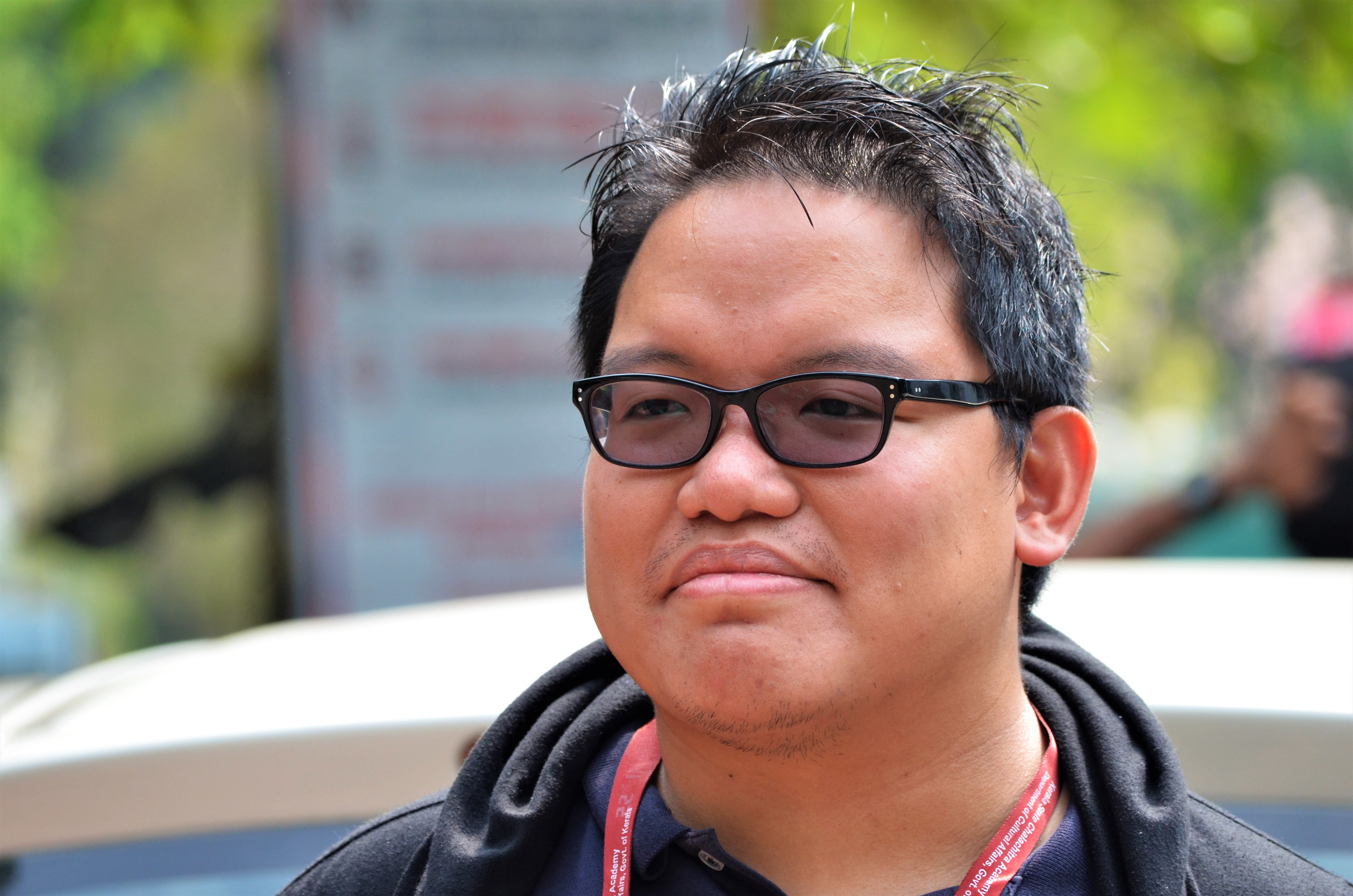
- Yeo in 2017
- Born: 6 March 1984 (age 42); Singapore
- Citizenship: Malaysia
- Occupations: Screenwriter; director; producer
- Years active: 2007–present
- Edmund Yeo's voice recorded at the IFFR 2015

Edmund Yeo (Chinese: 杨毅恒; pinyin: Yáng Yìhéng; born 6 March 1984) is a Singaporean-born Malaysian filmmaker, screenwriter and producer. He first received international acclaim in 2009 when his Japanese-language short film, Kingyo, premiered at the Venice Film Festival.

Since 2009, Yeo has written and directed fourteen short films and feature films to date and has won international awards, including the Best Director Award at the Tokyo International Film Festival for Aqérat (We, The Dead) in 2017.

== Early life ==
Yeo was born in Singapore. His father, Eric Yeo, is a film critic and a former exec of Polygram Records, where he produced the albums of the band Alleycats. His mother, Chik Soon Come, was a pop singer. Yeo moved to Petaling Jaya, Malaysia with his parents when he was 2.

He completed his Bachelor in Commerce at Murdoch University in Perth in 2005, majoring in Marketing and minoring in English Literature. Yeo then chose to enrol in a one-year graduate diploma course in media production at the same university.

== Career ==
In 2007, Yeo joined Greenlight Pictures, the production company of Malaysian filmmaker Woo Ming Jin, and took over producing and editing duties for Woo's film The Elephant and the Sea during post-production.

Yeo began writing and directing short films in 2008. His first short film, Chicken Rice Mystery, was made in March 2008, just before he moved to Tokyo to continue his Masters (and later, a PhD) in Waseda University. The short received a Best Acting Performance award for its lead actress Kimmy Kiew, and also an honourable mention at Malaysia's BMW Shorties 2008 from a jury that included Filipino filmmaker Raymond Red, Malaysian filmmaker Tan Chui Mui and actress Ida Nerina. A few months later, Yeo made an experimental short, Fleeting Images, a homage to Sans Soleil by French director Chris Marker. The short won the Grand Prix at the 6th CON-CAN Movie Festival in 2009 from an international jury headed by Japanese filmmaker Naomi Kawase.

He began rising to prominence in 2009 by writing and directing Love Suicides and Kingyo, two short films loosely adapted from the works of Yasunari Kawabata. Love Suicides had its world premiere at the Festival Paris Cinéma 2009 and won the Best Director award at the China Mobile Film Festival 2009. Kingyo, his first Japanese-language short, was selected for competition at the 66th Venice International Film Festival and won at Larissa Mediterranean Festival of New Filmmakers. Yeo was the youngest Malaysian filmmaker to ever compete in the prestigious film festival. Kingyo later received the Silver Grand Prix and Best New Creator awards at Japan's Eibunren Awards 2009. At the same year, he produced and edited Woo Ming Jin's Woman On Fire Looks For Water, which was also screened at the 66th Venice International Film Festival.

In 2010, Yeo produced, co-wrote and edited Woo Ming Jin's The Tiger Factory, which premiered at the 2010 Cannes Film Festival. He directed numerous short films of his own on the same year. Yeo was one of the eight filmmakers for Prada's Yo Video! Project, directing a one-minute short film called NOW that was streamed on Prada's official website.

Yeo also directed a short film spin-off of The Tiger Factory called Inhalation. A heavily improvised work adapted from a two-page script, Inhalation won the Sonje Award for Best Asian Short Film at Busan International Film Festival. The film was played together with The Tiger Factory at certain festival screenings, like Vancouver, Tokyo, Jakarta and Cinemanila International Film Festivals.

His short film Exhalation premiered in competition at the Dubai International Film Festival and screened at the 40th edition of the Rotterdam International Film Festival.

In 2014, Yeo's debut feature film River of Exploding Durians premiered in competition at the Tokyo International Film Festival. It was the first ever Malaysian film to be invited to the main competition section of the festival.

He returned to Tokyo International Film Festival in 2017 with two films, his sophomore film Aqerat (We, The Dead) in main competition, and a documentary Yasmin-san. He won the Best Director award for Aqerat (We, The Dead).

His 2020 film, Malu, is a Japanese-Malaysian co-production starring Malaysian and Japanese actors like Sherlyn Seo, MayJune Tan, Masatoshi Nagase and Kiko Mizuhara.

== Filmography ==
=== Director ===
Year	Title
2008	Chicken Rice Mystery
2008	Fleeting Images
2009	Love Suicides
2009	kingyo
2010	The White Flower
2010	Afternoon River, Evening Sky
2010	NOW
2010	Inhalation
2010	Exhalation
2011	Last Fragments of Winter
2014	River of Exploding Durians
2017	Yasmin-san
2017	Aqérat (We, The Dead)
2020	Malu
2021	Moonlight Shadow

=== Producer ===
Year	Title
2007	The Elephant and the Sea
2009	Woman On Fire Looks For Water
2010	The Tiger Factory
2014	The Second Life of Thieves
2022	Stone Turtle
2025	The Fox King
