= Liew Seng Tat =

Malaysian filmmaker

Chinese name
- Traditional Chinese: 劉城達
- Simplified Chinese: 刘城达
- Hanyu Pinyin: Liú Chéngdá
- Pha̍k-fa-sṳ: Liù Sàng-tha̍t
- Jyutping: Lau4 Sing4 Daat6
- Hokkien POJ: Lâu Sêng-ta̍t

Liew Seng Tat (born 30 September 1979) is a Malaysian filmmaker based in Kuala Lumpur, Malaysia.

== Early life ==
Liew Seng Tat was born in an area of Kuala Lumpur called Jinjang. He graduated from the Multimedia University in Cyberjaya, majoring in 3D animation.

== Film career ==
Seng Tat has been actively involved in the Malaysian independent film scene since 2003. His first live-action short film "Bread skin with Strawberry Jam" garnered much attention and won at the 8th Malaysian Video Awards. In 2004, he set up Da Huang Pictures with Amir Muhammad, James Lee, and Tan Chui Mui.

In 2007, his first feature film Flower in the Pocket made its world premiere at the 12th Pusan International Film Festival and won the New Currents and the KNN Audience Awards. The film has also won the VPRO Tiger Award at the 37th International Film Festival Rotterdam 2008, "Le Regard d’Or" (Golden Gaze) Award at the 22nd Fribourg International Film Festival 2008, and the Jury prize (Lotus du Jury) at the 10th Deauville Asian Film Festival 2008.

== Filmography ==
=== Feature films ===
- Flower in the Pocket (2007; New Current and KNN Audience Awards, 12th Pusan International Film Festival, 2007; VPRO Tiger Award, 37th International Film Festival Rotterdam, 2008; "Le Regard d’Or" Award, 22nd Fribourg International Film Festival, 2008; Jury prize "Lotus du Jury", 10th Deauville Asian Film Festival, 2008)
- Men Who Save the World (2014)

=== Short films ===
- Daughters (2006, Malay, Drama; Commissioned by 36th Rotterdam Film Festival, as part of Meet the Maestro Gus Van Sant programme).
- Man in Love (2006, Malay, Comedy Drama; 36th Rotterdam Film Festival)
- Matahari (2006, Documentary; 36th Rotterdam Film Festival)
- Tudung (2005, Malay, Documentary; 24th Los Angeles Asian Pacific Film Festival)
- Flower (2005, Mandarin & Malay, Comedy Drama; Opening film at the 2006 Busan Asian Short Film Festival; 35th Rotterdam Film Festival; 2004, 9th Malaysian Video Awards (MVA) Best Short Film Drama (Open) Silver; 2005, 9th Malaysian Video Awards Best ASEAN Short Film Bronze)
- Not Cool (2004, Cantonese & Malay, Comedy Drama; 2004, 9th Malaysian Video Awards Best Short Film Drama(Open) Gold; 2004, 9th Malaysian Video Awards Best ASEAN Short Film Gold)
- Bread Skin With Strawberry Jam (2003; 2003, 8th Malaysian Video Awards Best Short Film Drama (Open) Gold; 2003, 8th Malaysian Video Awards Best ASEAN Short Film (Below 60 min) Silver)
- Don't Play Play (2002, Hokkien & English, 3D animation, Comedy Drama; 4th Mise-en-scene Genre Film Festival 2005; Short Shorts Film Festival Asia, Japan 2004; 26th Asian American International Film Festival, New York 2003; 9th International Animation Festival in Japan, Hiroshima 2002)
- The Good and the Evil, 2000 (3D animation)
- Citizens, (2017), co-written and co-directed with Pete Teo
