= Anida Yoeu Ali =

Cambodian-American artist

Anida Yoeu Ali is a Cambodian-American artist. Her works include span performance, art installation, videos, and images. Installation art is an artistic genre of three-dimensional works that often are site-specific and designed to transform the perception of a space.

== Early life and education ==
Anida Yoeu Ali is a Muslim-Khmer woman. She was born in 1974 in Battambang, the capital city in north western Cambodia, and soon after her family fled the war after Vietnam invaded. Her family stayed in a refugee camp in Thailand starting in 1979, then moved to Malaysia to stay with family before finally coming to the United States. She grew up in Chicago and then moved to Phnom Penh in 2011. Ali first obtained her bachelor's degree in Fine Arts (B.F.A) at the University of Illinois in 1996. In 2010, she finished her master's degree of Fine Arts (M.F.A) at the Art Institute of Chicago. She also has a B.F.A in Graphic Design from the University of Illinois Urbana- Champaign.

== Career ==
Ali was an assistant professor in International Studies at Trinity College from 2015 to 2016. Ali's work with the group "I Was Born With Two Tongues" (1998–2003) is archived with the Smithsonian Asian Pacific American Program. Ali co-founded and was executive producer of the Mango Tribe (2000–2006), an alternative performance collective to voice the stories of Asian and Pacific Islander American women. History of the Mango Tribe is archived at the University of Chicago Special Collections Library in the Queer Asian American collection. She has received grants from the Rockefeller Foundation, Ford Foundation, the National Endowment of the Arts, and the Illinois Arts Council. She is a collaborative partner with Studio Revolt, a trans-nomadic artist run media lab. At the University of Washington Bothell, Ali does research as an Artist-in-Residence, while also teaching courses in literature, fine arts, and performance at the university. She focuses her research on artistic storytelling and how people can make their stake in the world through doing so.

Ali has worked with filmmakers to create "1700% Project: Mistaken for Muslim" to address an increase in violence toward the Muslim community after the 9/11 terrorist attack. Worked on with her husband, a Japanese video producer named Masahiro Sugano, the video depicts a poet, dancer, angel, and prisoner speaking out against anti-Muslim hate crimes. This is also reinforced with images of hate crimes taking place, to show the disturbing nature of such discourse.

In 2017, Ali's artwork The Red Chador disappeared after she was strip-searched and detained by immigration during a trip to Palestine. She discovered the artwork missing from her luggage once arriving in the USA. As a follow-up artwork, she announced The Red Chador as dead to make a statement about rising anti-Muslim sentiments, as well as other human rights violations and forced disappearances.

=== Buddhism in Artwork ===
Anida Yoeu Ali's work The Buddhist Bug, Into the Night (2015) and her earlier works, including "The Old Cinema" (2014), extends from her Buddhist Bug series of photographs, videos and live performances. In these works, the artist playfully inhabits a sinuous, caterpillar-like costume whose color references the robes of Buddhist monks, in which the bug is also not given a specific gender to be "hybrid in nature". Ali's bug was inspired by her fascination with Buddhism and the exploration of diasporic identities. The project developed when Ali returned to her birthplace of Cambodia as a means of inhabiting and recording Cambodia's changing rural and metropolitan landscapes, and of negotiating her culturally mixed background. The series depicts an art deco cinema, Golden Temple, to make reference to what was known as the "Golden Era" of Cambodian Cinema, a period which the younger generation looks back on fondly and is depicted as so in the series, in which the Buddhist Bug tries to find identity and "otherness". The bug finds instead an emptiness, a "loss in a glorious past", and finally a shadow of him/herself. In a series of social encounters in locations around Phnom Penh, Ali's bug impassively occupies central stage among communities, schools, cinemas, restaurants, bars, and urban and rural landscapes undergoing rapid change and development, in order to challenge religious intolerance, difference in others, and a globalizing world.

=== Awards ===
In 2015, Anida Yoeu Ali won the Sovereign Asian Prize in Hong Kong. The Sovereign Asian Art Prize was launched in 2004 and aims at encouraging Asian promising artists while acting as a fundraiser for charities. Her winning piece is called Spiral Alley - a photographic print from The Buddhist Bug. Ali was also the $20,000 grand prize recipient in the Millennium Park music festival's online video contest, with her work titled, "1700% Project: Mistaken for Muslim".
