= Flower in the Pocket =

- Film poster
- Directed by: Liew Seng Tat
- Written by: Liew Seng Tat
- Produced by: Yen San Michelle Lo
- Starring: Wong Zi Jiang; Lim Ming Wei; Amira Nasuha Shahiran; James Lee; Azman Md. Hasan
- Cinematography: Albert Hue See Leong
- Edited by: Liew Seng Tat
- Production company: Da Huang Pictures
- Release date: 20 December 2007
- Running time: 97 minutes
- Country: Malaysia
- Languages: Mandarin; Cantonese; Malay
- Budget: RM 64,000
- Box office: RM 11,000

Flower in the Pocket (Chinese: 口袋裏的花) is a 2007 Malaysian independent film written and directed by Liew Seng Tat. The film was produced by Da Huang Pictures.

== Plot ==
Li Ahh and Li Ohm grow up motherless. Their father Sui is a workaholic who spends most of his time mending broken mannequins. Sui is an outsider to the two boys, the only legacy left by the woman he loved, or still loves.

While he shuts himself out from the world, the two brothers grow up with all the freedom of neglected children. They roam the streets; get into fights and other trouble in school. Along the way, they adopt a stray puppy, which becomes the most important thing in their lives.

When the puppy is sent away for being a nuisance, the boys are devastated. Sui is very much affected by his boys' strong emotional attachment to the puppy. For the very first time, he realises that he is still able to love and he's going to do something about it before it's too late.

== Cast ==
- Wong Zi Jiang as Ma Li Ohm
- Lim Ming Wei as Ma Li Ahh
- Amira Nasuha Shahiran as Atan/Ayu
- James Lee as Ah Sui, Li Ohm and Li Ahh's father
- Azman Md. Hasan as Mamat

== Awards ==
- New Currents Award, 12th Pusan International Film Festival 2007
- KNN Audience Award, 12th Pusan International Film Festival 2007
- VPRO Tiger Award, 37th International Film Festival Rotterdam 2008
- "Le Regard d’Or" (Golden Gaze) Award, 22nd Fribourg International Film Festival 2008
- Jury prize (Lotus du Jury), 10th Deauville Asian Film Festival 2008

== Screenings ==
“Flower In The Pocket is constantly, quietly, astonishing. A little film with big, deep pockets, Flower is equal parts childhood idyll, absurdist comedy, gentle social satire and family mystery." commented Shelly Kraicer, film programmer of Vancouver Film Festival.

"A touching and humanistic storythat tells a neglected father-and-sons relationship with a sense of humour, while using a simply and beautifully composed cinematic style.”, said Dariush Mehrjui, head of th jury of 12th Pusan International Film Festival.

== Reception ==
Screen Anarchy commented, "Upon closer scrutiny, the film would probably yield some insights into racial divides or the lack thereof, or the absence of an authority figure, but as a film alone, it is the most entertaining work to come out of the Malaysian independent cinema. It is also a fitting debut feature that is a perfect introduction to the wildly offbeat world of Liew Seng Tat." A review in Variety was more mixed about the film, stating, "Certain moments of humor may work best at home, but enough comes through to help pass over the longueurs. Liew takes more care than many of his colleagues in offering reasonable digital quality, though use of music is both inconsistent and poorly integrated."
