= The Long Walk (2019 film) =

2019 film

- Film poster
- Directed by: Mattie Do
- Written by: Christopher Larsen
- Produced by: Mattie Do; Justin Deimen; Christopher Larsen; Annick Mahnert; Abhi Rastogi; Douangmany Soliphanh
- Starring: Yannawoutthi Chanthalungsy; Vilouna Phetmany; Por Silatsa; Noutnapha Soydara
- Cinematography: Matthew Macar
- Edited by: Zohar Michel
- Music by: Anthony Weeden
- Release date: 4 September 2019 (Venice)
- Country: Laos
- Language: Lao

The Long Walk (Lao: ບໍ່ມີວັນຈາກ) is a 2019 Laotian drama film directed by Mattie Do, and her third feature film overall. It premiered in the Giornate degli Autori section of the 76th Venice International Film Festival. It also screened in the Contemporary World Cinema section at the 2019 Toronto International Film Festival.

== Plot ==
An old Laotian hermit discovers that the ghost of a road accident victim can transport him back in time fifty years to the moment of his mother's painful death.

== Cast ==
- Yannawoutthi Chanthalungsy as The Old Man
- Vilouna Phetmany as Lina
- Por Silatsa as The Boy
- Noutnapha Soydara as The Girl
- Chanthamone Inoudome as The Mother
- Brandon Hashimoto as Kenji

== Release ==
The Long Walk was given favourable reviews from critics. On Rotten Tomatoes the film received a 96% positive rating based on 48 reviews, with the consensus stating that the film "may require patience from some viewers, but they'll be rewarded with a thoughtful and alluringly atmospheric ghost story."
