= Woo Ming Jin =

Malaysian film director

- Occupations: Film director, writer and producer

Woo Ming Jin is a Malaysian film director, writer and producer. His films have screened in film festivals such as Cannes, Berlin and Venice. He is also the co-founder of Greenlight Pictures, a film and television production house based in Kuala Lumpur.

== Biography ==
=== Early career ===
Woo Ming Jin was born and raised in Malaysia. At 19 years old, he went to the United States to study business in Boston but he had always wanted to be a filmmaker. He was then accepted to San Diego State University and earned a Master's degree in Film and Television Production.

=== Monday Morning Glory ===
His first film Monday Morning Glory (2005) screened at the Berlin and Locarno Film Festivals, while his second, Elephant and the Sea (2007), won awards in Torino, Cinema Digital Seoul, Portugal and Spain film festivals. Woman on Fire Looks for Water (2009) premiered at the Venice International Film Festival, and has played in Busan, Rotterdam, Los Angeles and the Pompidou Center in Paris, among many others. The film is about a group of men arrested for the terrorist bombing of a nightclub have to reenact their actions for the police and media.

=== The Tiger Factory ===
The Tiger Factory (2010), only the third film in Malaysian history to be selected to the Cannes Film Festival, premiered at the Directors' Fortnight, and won the Special Jury Mention at the Tokyo Film Festival in 2010. The film is about a girl named Ping Ping who wants to go to Japan to start a better life. She shuffles between two jobs; working in a pig farm, and cleaning dishes in a rundown restaurant. The film is described as a "rather uplifting tale about a young girl who is forced to rely on herself because she has no real support system".

=== KL Zombi ===
In 2011, he conceived the idea for a zombie horror thriller titled Zombijaya. The book, which was written by Adib Zaini for Buku FIXI, tells the tale of a slacker who becomes a reluctant hero when a zombie outbreak robs him of the only life he knows. It would later evolve into a film in 2013 titled KL Zombi, in which Woo became the film director. The film adaptation became a box office success and one of the highest VOD films of the year. The film was also screened at the 18th Bucheon International Fantastic Film Festival from the 17th until the 24th of July 2014.

=== The Second Life of Thieves ===
The Second Life of Thieves (2014), premiered at the Busan International Film Festival and has been supported by the Hubert Bals Fund of Rotterdam, and the Vision Sud Est Fund. The film is about Mr. Tan, the village chief, discovers his wife has disappeared with his good friend Mr. Lai. Forming an unlikely friendship with Mr. Lai's daughter Sandy, both of them embark on an emotional journey that will open old and new wounds alike. Juxtaposing between present day and 30 years in the past, the film is a meditation on love, lost, and regret. The story is inspired by Woo's late uncle and the secret life that he reportedly led.

=== Return to Nostalgia ===
In 2015, he was commissioned by the Busan International Film Festival and KBS Studios to make a documentary on Malaysia's cinematic history. The resulting film, Return To Nostalgia, premiered at the festival, and was the opening film for the “Power of Asian Cinema” series.

Woo and his crew travelled across the peninsula of Malaysia and Singapore in search of the lost film Seruan Merdeka (1947). Seruan Merdeka is the first post-World War II film made in Malaya. It is also the first film in the history of Malaysian cinema to feature a biracial cast of Malays and Chinese. While gradually uncovering information about the lost film, a doorway into one of Malaya's most turbulent times – the Japanese Occupation – is revealed.

Stone Turtle

Stone Turtle screened in the Main Competition section in the Locarno International Film Festival. It won the Fipresci Prize. The film is a time bending revenge thriller interspersed with animation, centering on a mysterious woman who encounters a man whom she'd had a past with. Variety called it a "Stunning Malaysian Mystery Puts a Supernatural Twist on Real-World Trauma". The film stars Asmara Abigail and Bront Palarae. It played in more than 50 film festivals internationally and was an Amazon Prime exclusive film.

The Fox King

The Fox King stars Indonesian superstar Dian Sastro, along with Idan Aedan, Hadi Putra, Chew Kin Wah, and Amerul Affendi. The film premiered at the 50th Toronto International Film Festival. The film tells the intimate story of a set of fraternal twins whose relationship cracks with the appearance of their beautiful new teacher.

== Greenlight Pictures ==
Greenlight Pictures is founded by Woo alongside Edmund Yeo who has produced all of Woo's films, including Woman on Fire Looks for Water, and The Tiger Factory, which premiered at the Venice and Cannes film festivals. In 2012, its co-production with CPH-Dox, Girl in the Water, won Denmark's Academy Award for best short film. Locally, Greenlight Pictures produces various content for television and the internet, from commercials to TV programs and drama series. Autumn Di Hatiku 1 & 2, made for Tonton Digital, received nominations for best digital show in the Asia TV Awards in 2014.

Greenlight Pictures also worked on KL Zombi, which was a box office hit in 2013. Other film credits include Mamak Cupcake, and two upcoming features in 2015/2016. Double, a horror short, was executive produced by Justin Lin, premiered on YouTube in 2012.

In 2014, Greenlight Pictures produced two feature films, The Second Life of Thieves and River of Exploding Durians, which was accepted for Competition at the Tokyo International Film Festival – the first ever Malaysian film to do so.

== Filmography ==
=== Selected filmography ===
Year	Title	Roles	Notes
2025	The Fox King	Director/Writer/Producer	Toronto International Film Festival
2024	Indera	Director/Writer/Producer	Bucheon International Fantastic Film Festival
2022	Stone Turtle	Director/Writer/Producer	Locarno International Film Festival
2021	Zombitopia	Director/Writer/Producer	
2015	Return to Nostalgia	Director/Writer	Busan International Film Festival
2014	Second Life of Thieves	Director/Writer/Producer	Busan International Film Festival Singapore International Film Festival Rotterdam International Film Festival Torino Gay and Lesbian Film Festival Minneapolis St. Paul International Film Festival
2014	Mamak Cupcake	Director	
2014	Autumn Di Hatiku (Autumn in My Heart)	Director/Writer	Digital Webseries for Tonton Digital Nominated for Best Digital Series in the Asian Television Awards
2013	KL Zombi	Director	Puchon International Film Festival ASEAN International Film Festival
2012	Double	Director/Writer/Producer (Short Film)	Short film commissioned by Justin Lin (Fast 5) for his YOMYOMF YouTube channel
2011	60 Seconds of Solitude in Year Zero	Director	Anthology film consisting of 60 directors
2011	Girl in the Water	Director (Short Film)	Best Short Film, Roberts Award (Denmark) Rotterdam International Film Festival CPX Film Festival Warsaw International Film Festival
2011	Seru (Resurrection)	Co-director/Co-writer	Puchon International Film Festival 2011
2011	Hatiku Di Kinabalu (My Heart in Kinabalu)	Director	Television Movie, Astro
2010	The Tiger Factory	Director/Writer/Producer	Cannes Film Festival, Directors' Fortnight Tokyo International Film Festival (Special Jury Mention, Winds of Asia) Busan International Film Festival Hamburg Film Festival Vancouver Film Festival Warsaw Film Festival Hawaii Film Festival Mumbai Film Festival Mostra de São Paulo Gijon Film Festival Tallinn Black Nights Film Festival Nantes 3 Continents Cinemanila Film Festival Kerala Film Festival Rotterdam International Film Festival (2011) Geneve Black Movie Film Festival 2011 Fribourg Film Festival Las Palmas de Gran Canaria 2011 Canberra Cinematheque 2011 Los Angeles Asian Pacific FF 2011 Pittsburgh Silk Screen Film Festival 2011 Mexico Distrital Film Festival 2011 St Petersburg Kinoforum 2011 South East Asian Film Festival Singapore (2011)
2009	15Malaysia	Director/Editor	Directed/edited the Slovak Sling short film segment
2009	Woman on Fire Looks for Water	Director/Writer/Producer	Venice Film Festival (Horizons) Busan Film Festival Cinemanila Film Festival (Special Mention Award) Rotterdam International Film Festival (2010) Hong Kong Asian Independent Film Festival Open Doek Film Festival (2010) New Era Horizons (2010) San Francisco Film Festival (2010) Los Angeles Film Festival (2010) Denmark CPH:PIX (2010) World Film Festival Amsterdam L’Alternativa Film Festival Films From the South FF Asian American Film Festival New York Haifa International Film Festival Vienna International Film Festival Southeast Asian Film Festival Hawaii Focus on Asia Film Festival Pyongyang Film Festival Munich Film Festival Buenos Aires International Film Festival (BAFICI) Malaysia Cinema Focus in Rio de Janeiro CineJeune Film Festival South East Asian Film Festival Singapore (2011)
2008	Kurus (Days of the Turquoise Sky)	Director/Writer	Bangkok International Film Festival (Special Jury Prize, Golden Kinaree Awards)
2007	Blue Roof	Director/Writer (Short Film)	Busan International Film Festival (Three Colours of New Malaysian Cinema Program)
2007	The Elephant and The Sea	Director/Writer/Producer/Editor	Torino International Film Festival Winner: Special Jury Prize Cinema Digital Seoul Film Festival Winner: Best Director Award Critics Award DIBA Barcelona Film Festival (2008) Winner: Best Director Lisbon Village Film Festival (2008) Winner: Grand Prize, Best Film Rotterdam International Film Festival Los Angeles International Film Festival Seattle International Film Festival Karlovy Vary International Film Festival Asian American International Film Festival Hong Kong International Film Festival Santiago International Film Festival Vancouver International Film Festival Flanders International Film Festival Warsaw Film Festival Blackmovie Film Festival Geneva Las Palmas International Film Festival
2005	It's Possible Your Heart Cannot Be Broken	Director/Writer	Singapore International Film Festival (2006) Los Angeles Asian Pacific Film Festival (2006) Hawaii International Film Festival (2006)
2005	Monday Morning Glory	Director/Writer/Producer/Editor	Berlin International Film Festival, Forum (2006) Locarno International Film Festival (2006) San Francisco Int’l Film Festival Tokyo Int’l Film Festival Pusan Int’l Film Festival Bangkok International Film Festival Osian's Film Festival
