= Fantastic Fest =

Annual film festival held in Austin, Texas, U.S.

- Status: Active
- Genre: Film festival
- Location: Austin, Texas
- Country: United States
- Inaugurated: 2005; 21 years ago
- Most recent: September 17–24, 2026
- Organizer: Alamo Drafthouse
- Website: fantasticfest.com

Fantastic Fest is an annual film festival held in Austin, Texas, specializing in fantasy, horror, science fiction, action and cult films. Founded in 2005 by Tim League, founder of Alamo Drafthouse, the festival is regarded as one of the leading genre film festivals in the United States and internationally.

Lisa Dreyer is the festival director, while Annick Mahnert serves as head of programming.

== History ==
The festival takes place in September at the Alamo Drafthouse South Lamar, filling eight screens for eight days and hosting many writers, directors, and actors, either well-established or emerging. The festival has become known as a launch-pad for genre films, where critical acclaim at the fest can lead to big box office returns.

A notable feature of this festival is the inclusion of "secret screenings". For these screenings, the audience often does not know what the film will be until seated, moments before it begins. It also features many themed parties, outings, film-themed "feasts", and other events that are hallmarks of the original Alamo Drafthouse Cinema.

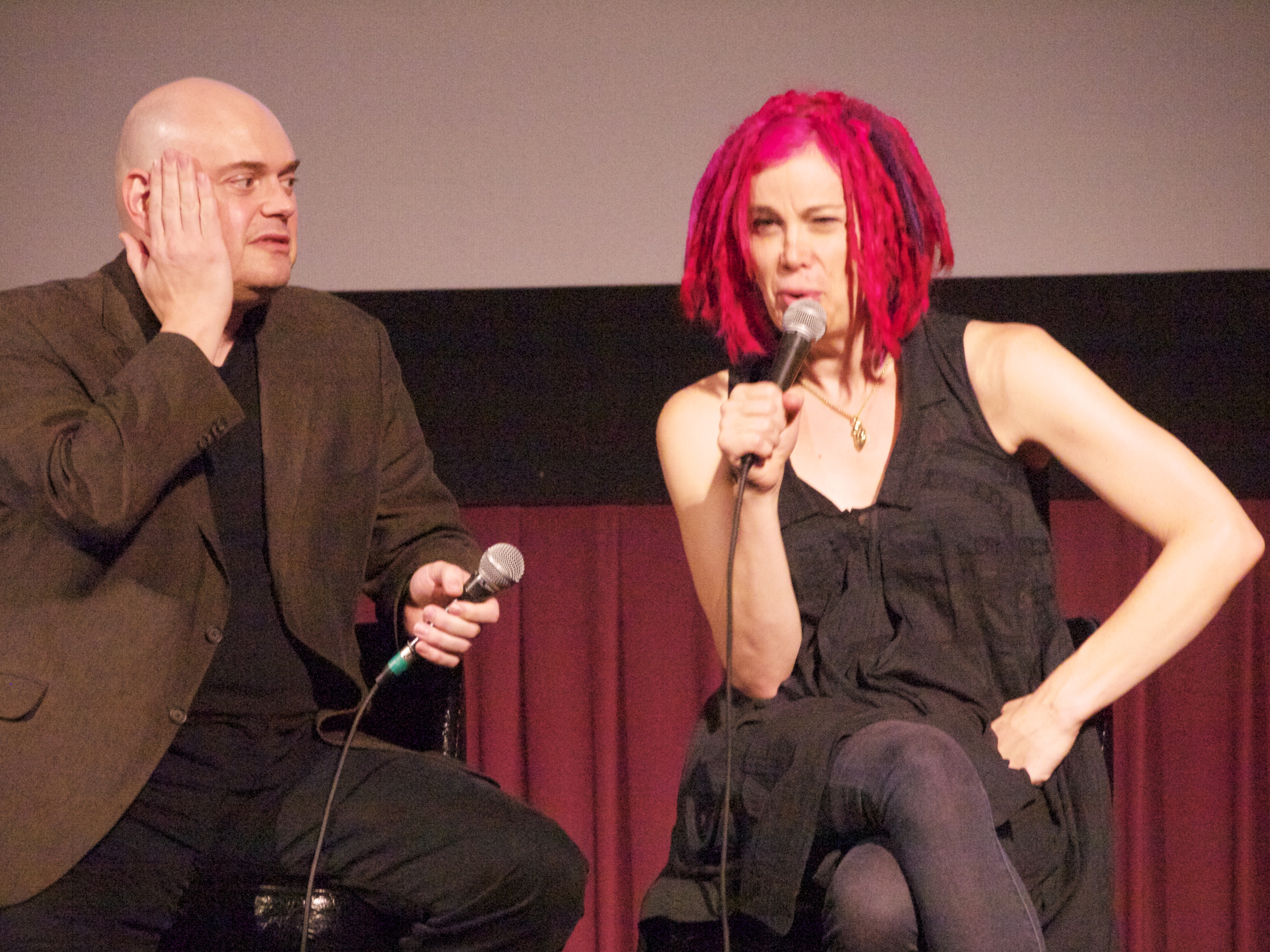
The Wachowskis at Fantastic Fest 2012

In 2007, Variety publisher Charles Koones included Fantastic Fest as one of "Ten Festivals We Love". In 2008, MovieMaker named it one of "The 25 Film Festivals Worth the Entry Fee". In 2017, MovieMaker included the festival on its list of "The 25 Coolest Film Festivals in the World."

In 2022, an online-exclusive section of programming was created called "Burnt Ends", which was said to showcase "the weirdest, wildest, most fringe films out there."

== See also ==
- List of fantastic and horror film festivals
