= Mattie Do =

Laotian film director

- ແມດດີ ໂດ
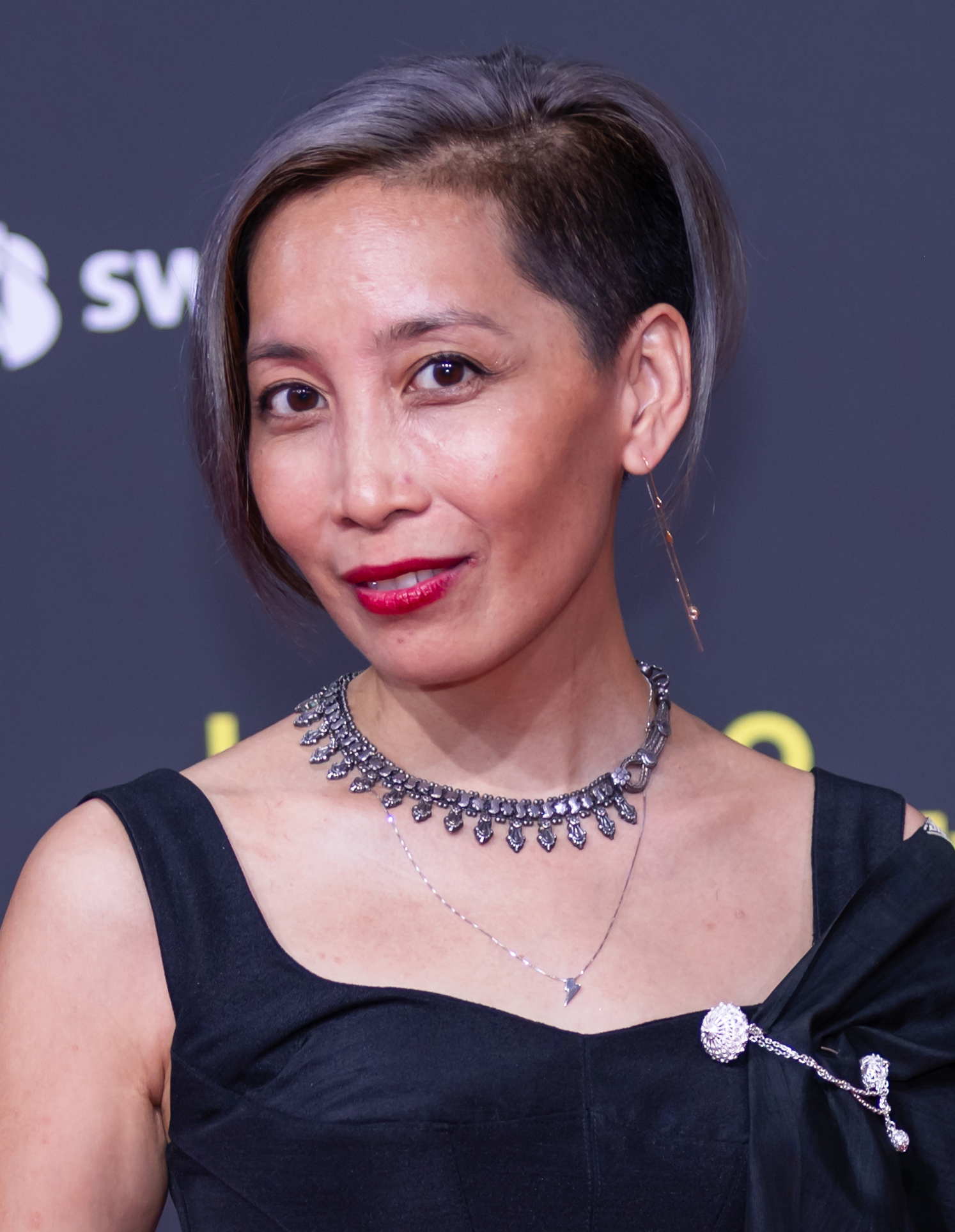
- at the 2025 Locarno Film Festival
- Born: Los Angeles, California, U.S.
- Occupations: Film director; film producer
- Years active: 2012–present

Mattie Do (Lao: ແມດດີ ໂດ) is a Laotian film director. She is Laos's first and only female film director and the first horror film director from Laos.

== Personal life ==
Do was born in Los Angeles, California, to immigrant parents who left Laos during the communist revolution. Do returned to Vientiane in 2010 with her husband to take care of her retired father. She trained originally as a make-up artist and worked on film productions in Europe and America before becoming a consultant to the oldest film company in Laos, Lao Art Media, upon her return in 2010. She, her husband and their dog Mango live in Vientiane, Laos.

== Career ==
=== Chanthaly ===
Her directorial debut, Chanthaly (Lao: ຈັນທະລີ) (2012), was the first horror film written and directed entirely in Laos, as well as the first to be screened at major film festivals outside of Southeast Asia like the 2013 Fantastic Fest.

=== Dearest Sister ===
Do's second feature film, Dearest Sister (2016), (Lao: ນ້ອງຮັກ) was chosen to attend the 2014 Cannes Film Festival as part of the La Fabrique des Cinémas du monde program and was selected as the Laotian entry for the Best Foreign Language Film at the 90th Academy Awards, the first time that Laos submitted a film for consideration in this category. It was screened at more than 20 film festivals and was selected by Laos as its first Oscars submission for Best Foreign Language Film.

=== The Long Walk ===
Her third feature, The Long Walk (Lao: ບໍ່ມີວັນຈາກ) (2019), premiered in the Giornate degli Autori section of the 76th Venice International Film Festival. She won Best Director at the 45th Boston-Science Fiction Film Festival.

== Filmography ==
=== Feature films ===
Year	Title	Director	Writer	Producer	Notes
2012	Chanthaly	Yes	No	Yes	Also; makeup artist, sound editor
2015	River	No	No	Executive producer	
2016	Dearest Sister	Yes	No	Yes	Also makeup artist
2016	Bangkok Nites	No	No	Co-producer	
2019	The Long Walk	Yes	No	Yes	

=== Television ===
Year	Title	Director	Writer	Producer	Notes
2021	Creepshow	No	Yes	No	Episode: "Drug Traffic"

=== Short films ===
Year	Title	Director	Writer	Producer	Notes
2020	The Tuk Tuk of the Fifth Kind	No	No	Yes	
2025	The Sleeping Beauty	Yes	No	No	Premiered at the Locarno,

== Awards and nominations ==
Award	Year	Category	Nominated work	Result	Ref.
Venice Film Festival	2019	Venice Days	The Long Walk	Nominated	
Sitges Film Festival	2019	Best Director	The Long Walk	Won	
Sitges Film Festival	2019	Best Motion Picture	The Long Walk	Nominated	
Oldenburg International Film Festival	2021	Tribute	Mattie Do	Won	
Lusca Fantastic Film Fest	2019	Best International Director	The Long Walk	Won	
QCinema International Film Festival	2019	Asian Next Wave	The Long Walk	Nominated	
