= Southeast Asian cinema =

Southeast Asian cinema is the film industry and films produced in, or by natives of Southeast Asia. It includes any films produced in Brunei, Cambodia, East Timor, Indonesia, Laos, Malaysia, Myanmar, the Philippines, Singapore, Thailand and Vietnam. The majority of the films made in this region came from the Philippines, Thailand, and Indonesia where its filmmaking industries in these countries are already well-established with film directors such as Lino Brocka, Apichatpong Weerasethakul, and Joko Anwar are well-known outside of the region. Notable production studios in Southeast Asia include Star Cinema, Viva Films, TBA Studios and Reality Entertainment in the Philippines, GDH 559 and Sahamongkol Film International in Thailand, Rapi Films in Indonesia, Astro Shaw in Malaysia, Encore Films in Singapore, Studio 68 in Vietnam and LD Entertainment KH in Cambodia.

The history of cinema in the region started in Manila, Philippines, when the first ever movie theater in the country and in the region opened on January 1, 1897 at the Salon de Pertierra. It hosted public screenings for mostly imported foreign films including Espectaculo Scientifico. By late, the first ever Filipino film Dalagang Bukid (1919) was released and more local films followed.

Southeast Asian cinema is a sub-section of continental Asian cinema, which in turn comes under the umbrella term of World cinema, a term used in some anglophone countries to describe any foreign language films.

Map of Southeast Asia

== Key figures ==
=== Cambodia ===
- Davy Chou - Contemporary Cambodian director (Diamond Island, Return to Seoul)
- Kavich Neang - Contemporary Cambodian director (White Building)
- Haing S. Ngor – Academy Award-winning Cambodian-American actor (The Killing Fields)
- Rithy Panh – French-schooled filmmaker (Rice People, The Missing Picture, Graves Without a Name and Meeting with Pol Pot)
- Tim Pek -Australian film producer.
- Tea Lim Koun – Director of the highly acclaimed film The Snake King's Wife and The Snake King's Wife Part 2.
- Leak Lyda - Contemporary Cambodian director The Clock: Spirits Awakening, Rent Boy (2023 film) and The Night Curse of Reatrei.
- Semsak Visal - director The Ritual: Black Nun.
- Un Bunthoeurn - director Wishing Lollipop.
- Diep Sela - co-director The Night Curse of Reatrei and Mannequin Wedding.
- Diep Sovanndara - co-director Rent Boy (2023 film), Single Dad (film) and Crush Pu.
- Sok Leng - director Beheading (film).
- Huy Yaleng - director Fathers (film) and Vikaljarek.
- Kou Darachan - director Z-Mom.
- Nop Sombat - director The Weird Villa.
- Heng Tola - director The Haunted House (2005 film), Ghost Banana Tree and The Forest (2005 film).
- Inrasothythep Neth - director Tenement (2024 film).
- Mao Ayuth - director The Crocodile (film).
- Hui Keung - director Crocodile Man and Tida Sok Puos.
- Lim Bun Lun - director Chompa Toung.
- Fai Sam Ang - director The Snake King's Child, The Snake King's Grandchild, Moranak Meada and Preah Vesandor.
- Kam Chanty - director Nieng Arp.
- Uon Kon Thuok - director Thavory Meas Bong and Peil Dael Truv Yum.
- Biv Chai Leang - director Teav Aek and Kong Kam Kong Keo.
- Yvon Hem - director Abul Kasame, Shadow of Darkness, Chek Deth, Sovann Pancha, Ynav Bosseba and Sovannahong.
- Dy Saveth - director Sdach Domrei Sor,
- Ly Bum Yim - director An Euy Srey An, Sangkum Banh Loloke and Puthisen Neang Kangrey.
- So Min Chiv - director Dav Bakdong Meas, Cha'ung Dai Ovpuk and Ream Chbong Yeung.
- Tea Lum Kang - director Pov Chouk Sar.
- Chea Nuk - director Panhjapor Tevi.
- Saravuth - director Neang Champameas.
- Tat Somnang - director Kompull Boros Mok 2.
- Vann Vannak - director Chheam Entri Khmau.
- Sinn Sisamouth - director Chamrieng Et Preang Tuk.
- Tom Som - director Vanished (2009 film) and Staying Single When.
- Lay Nguon Heng - director Tep Sodachan.
- Norodom Sihanouk - director See Angkor and Die, My Village at Sunset, The Mysterious City, Twilight (1969 film) and Apsara (film).
- Ly You Sreang - director Preah Peay Phat.
- Ly Kim Srun - director Prasna Reatrey.
- Nop Nem - director Pkai Dos Kuntuy.
- Sok Min Chi - director Pkah Thgall Meas.
- Parn Puong Bopha - director Kone Prosa Srey, Mae Ombao Meas and Pdei L'a.
- Kulikar Sotho - director The Last Reel.
- Caylee So - director In the Life of Music.

=== Indonesia ===
- Usmar Ismail – The Father of Indonesian Cinema, Initiator of Indonesian Film Festival, Veteran director
- Djamaluddin Malik - The Father of Indonesian Cinema Industry, Initiator of Indonesian Film Festival, Veteran movie producer
- Ratna Asmara - Indonesian First Female Director (Sedap Malam)
- Teguh Karya – Director (Badai Pasti Berlalu, Ibunda)
- Bing Slamet – Veteran actor / The Father of Indonesian Comedy (Bing Slamet Koboi Cengeng).
- Benyamin Sueb – Veteran actor (Benyamin Biang Kerok).
- Christine Hakim – Veteran actress (Whispering Sands, Tjoet Nja Dien).
- Slamet Rahardjo Djarot - Veteran actor ( Badai Pasti Berlalu, Whispering Sands, Tjoet Nja Dien)
- Dono, Kasino, Indro – Veteran comedian group (Maju Kena Mundur Kena).
- Dian Sastrowardoyo – Popular actress (Whispering Sands).
- Garin Nugroho – Director (Opera Jawa, Memories of My Body).
- Sjumandjaja – Director (Si Doel Anak Modern).
- Aria Dewa – Director (Identitas).
- Riri Riza – Director (Petualangan Sherina, Gie, What's Up With Love?, Laskar Pelangi).
- Joko Anwar – director of several commercially successful horror films (Forbidden Door, Dead Time, A Copy of My Mind, Halfworlds, Satan's Slaves)
- Teddy Soeriaatmadja – Director (Lovely Man, Something in the Way)
- Iko Uwais – Martial-Arts Actor (Merantau, The Raid : Redemption, The Raid 2 : Berandal)
- Kamila Andini - Female director (The Mirror Never Lies, Yuni)
- Timo Tjahjanto - director of several commercially successful horror films (V/H/S/2, May the Devil Take You, The Night Comes for Us)
- Kimo Stamboel - director of several commercially successful horror films (V/H/S/2, The Night Comes for Us, Dancing Village: The Curse Begins)
- Adinia Wirasti - Actress (Ada Apa dengan Cinta?)
- Happy Salma - Actress (Before, Now & Then)
- Wregas Bhanuteja - Cannes-prize winning director (Prenjak, Photocopier, Andragogy)
- Yayan Ruhian - Martial-Arts Actor (The Raid : Redemption, The Raid 2 : Berandal, Beyond Skyline, John Wick: Chapter 3 - Parabellum)
- Angga Dwimas Sasongko - Director (One Day We'll Talk About Today, Stealing Raden Saleh, 13 Bombs in Jakarta)
- Nicholas Saputra - Popular actor ( Joni's Promise, Gie, Aruna & Her Palate)
- Reza Rahadian - Popular actor (Habibie & Ainun, Firegate, My Stupid Boss)

=== Laos ===
- Som Ock Southiponh – Independent director, producer and screenwriter (Red Lotus).
- Mattie Do – Independent Lao-American director and producer (The Long Walk, Dearest Sister, Chanthaly)
- Anysay Keola – Independent Lao director and founder of Lao New Wave Cinema (Expiration Date, Noy – Above it All, At the Horizon)

=== Malaysia ===
- P. Ramlee – Leading man, screenwriter and director
- Saloma - Actor, wife of P. Ramlee
- U-Wei Bin Haji Saari - Director and screenwriter
- Abdul Razak Mohaideen – Director
- Yasmin Ahmad – Director (Sepet)
- Michelle Yeoh - Malaysian-Chinese Academy Award Best Actress (Crazy Rich Asians, Everything Everywhere All at Once)
- Henry Golding – Actor (Crazy Rich Asians, Snake Eyes (2021 film))
- Amanda Nell Eu - Director (Tiger Stripes)

=== Myanmar ===
- Min Htin Ko Ko Gyi – Burmese film director and founder of the Human Rights Human Dignity International Film Festival. (Beyond the Dream and The Last Poem)
- Kyi Soe Tun – Myanmar's most prominent director. His films include Upstream and Blood.

=== Philippines ===
- José Nepomuceno – The Father of the Philippine Cinema
- Rogelio de la Rosa – Pre-World War II matinee idol
- Brillante Mendoza – Cannes Film Festival Best Director (Kinatay)
- Jaclyn Jose – Cannes Film Festival Best Actress (Ma' Rosa)
- John Arcilla – Venice Film Festival Best Actor (On The Job: The Missing 8)
- Lav Diaz – Venice, Berlinale, and Locarno prize-winning director (The Woman Who Left, A Lullaby to the Sorrowful Mystery, From What Is Before)
- Ronnie del Carmen – Academy Award-nominated animator (Inside Out)
- Raymond Red – Cannes prize-winning director (Anino)
- Dolly de Leon - Golden Globe-nominated Actress (Historya ni Ha, Triangle of Sadness)
- Nora Aunor – Internationally award winning actress (Himala, Thy Womb)
- Lino Brocka – Internationally acclaimed director (Tinimbang Ka Ngunit Kulang, Maynila: Sa mga Kuko ng Liwanag)
- Erik Matti – Internationally acclaimed director (On the Job, On the Job: The Missing 8, Seklusyon)
- Eddie Romero – Awarded National Artist of the Philippines
- Eddie Garcia – Veteran actor and director
- Fernando Poe Jr. - Veteran actor and director (Ang Panday, Iyo ang Tondo, Kanya ang Cavite, Ang Probinsyano)
- Vilma Santos – Veteran actress (Anak)
- Jay Ilagan - Veteran actor (Soltero,Sister Stella L.)
- Christopher de Leon - Veteran actor (Hindi Nahahati ang Langit, Cain and Abel)
- Charo Santos-Concio - Veteran actress (Aguila, Kakabakaba Ka Ba?)
- Ishmael Bernal – Director (Himala)
- Gerardo de Leon – Director (Banaue)
- Mike de Leon – Director (Kisapmata, Batch '81)
- Marilou Diaz-Abaya – Director (Moral, José Rizal, Muro-Ami)
- Maryo J. de los Reyes – Director (Magnifico).
- Jerrold Tarog – Director (Heneral Luna, Goyo: Ang Batang Heneral)
- Isabel Sandoval – Filipino director (Aparisyon, Lingua Franca)
- Avid Liongoren – Animator (Saving Sally, Hayop Ka!)
- Petersen Vargas – Director (2 Cool 2 Be 4gotten, An Inconvenient Love)
- Antoinette Jadaone - Director (That Thing Called Tadhana, Fan Girl, Sunshine)
- Jun Robles Lana – Director (Die Beautiful, About Us But Not About Us)
- Chai Fonacier - Actress (Patay na si Hesus, Nocebo)
- Elijah Canlas - Actor (Kalel, 15)
- Maris Racal - Actress (Sunshine)

=== Singapore ===
- Anthony Chen – Director and producer (Ilo Ilo, Wet Season, The Breaking Ice)
- Boo Junfeng – Director and screenwriter (Sandcastle, Apprentice)
- Eric Khoo – Director and producer (Mee Pok Man, 12 Storeys)
- Jack Neo – Actor and director (I Not Stupid, Ah Boys to Men)
- K. Rajagopal – Director and screenwriter (A Yellow Bird)
- Kirsten Tan – Director and screenwriter (Pop Aye)
- Royston Tan – Director and producer (15, 881)
- Sandi Tan – Critic and director (Shirkers)
- Tan Pin Pin – Documentarian (To Singapore, With Love)
- He Shuming – Director and screenwriter (Ajoomma)

=== Thailand ===
- Apichatpong Weerasethakul – Cannes-prize winning Thai avant garde director (Blissfully Yours, Tropical Malady, Uncle Boonmee Who Can Recall His Past Lives, Memoria).
- Chatrichalerm Yukol – Veteran director (The Legend of Suriyothai, King Naresuan).
- Nonzee Nimibutr – Director and producer who influenced the Thai industry's pan-Asian directions (Nang Nak, Jan Dara).
- The Pang Brothers – Although born in Hong Kong, these twin-brother filmmakers got their start in Thailand and made Bangkok Dangerous in 1999 and The Eye, a pan-Asian co-production in 2002.
- Pen-Ek Ratanaruang – "New wave" director (Last Life in the Universe, Invisible Waves).
- Wisit Sasanatieng – "New wave" director (Tears of the Black Tiger, Citizen Dog).
- Banjong Pisanthanakun – director of several commercially successful horror films, including Shutter, Pee Mak and The Medium.
- Nawapol Thamrongrattanarit - independent director of contemporary films such as 36, Mary Is Happy, Mary Is Happy and Happy Old Year.
- Petchara Chaowarat – iconic leading lady of Thai films in the 1960s and '70s.
- Tony Jaa – Action star (Ong-Bak: Muay Thai Warrior, Tom-Yum-Goong).
- Pimchanok Luevisadpaibul – contemporary Thai actress.
- Chutimon Chuengcharoensukying – contemporary young Thai actress known for her role in Bad Genius.
- Mario Maurer – young actor of Chinese and German lineage, widely known in Asia for his performance in The Love of Siam.
- Sunny Suwanmethanont – contemporary Thai actor of French and Singaporean descent.

=== Vietnam ===
- Tran Anh Hung – French-trained expatriate director of Cyclo and other films.
- Nguyen Vo Nghiem Minh – (Buffalo Boy)
- Dang Nhat Minh – (Girl on the River, Guava Season)
- Tony Bui – (Yellow Lotus, Green Dragon)
- Ringo Le – Vietnamese-American film director ("Saigon Love Story")
- Dustin Nguyen – Vietnamese-American actor.
- Johnny Tri Nguyen – Vietnamese-American stuntman and actor (Tom-Yum-Goong, Saigon Eclipse)
- Veronica Ngô – Vietnamese-Norwegian actress and singer (Furie)
- Hong Chau – Academy Award-nominated Vietnamese-American actress (The Whale)

== See also ==
- Cinema of the world
- World cinema
- Asian cinema
- East Asian cinema
- South Asian cinema
- Middle Eastern cinema
