= Tep Rindaro =

Cambodian actor and singer

- ទេព រិនដារ៉ូ
- Born: 1963 (age 62–63); Battambang Province, Cambodia
- Occupations: Actor; singer
- Years active: 1987–present

Tep Rindaro (Khmer: ទេព រិនដារ៉ូ [teːp rɨnɗaroː]; born 1963) is a Cambodian actor and singer. He started acting in 1987. With his career spanning more over 30 years, he is one of the longest starring actors in Cambodia since the fall of the Khmer Rouge in 1979.

== Early life ==
Rindaro was born in the village of Samrong, Battambang Province, in northwestern Cambodia and developed a passion for films at an early age. As a child, he went to the movies a lot and always dreamed of one day appearing on the big screen. Life was peaceful and tranquil in Samrong, relatively speaking, until the Cambodian Civil War intensified, affecting even tranquil Samrong. In 1975 the country finally fell to the communists and the nation was plunged into turmoil and chaos. The country's movie industry dissolved overnight and life drastically and irreversibly changed for everyone. At age twelve the young boy was sent to a work camp to do hard labor for the next three and a half years. Somehow, Rindaro managed to survive this terrible period though tragically, his father and several other family members did not survive the Khmer Rouge era. Afterward, though he still dreamed of becoming an actor, he wanted to honor his father's wishes for him to be a doctor, a prestigious position in Cambodian society. Rindaro chose to study something more practical and decided instead to become an airplane mechanic. In 1981 he received a government scholarship to study in Russia as an airplane mechanic, though he never lost his dream of stardom. He worked as a mechanic mainly out of respect for, and in order to honor his now deceased father's wishes. In 1984, he returned to Cambodia from Russia with flying qualifications. Since there were no employment opportunities available at the Pochentong Airport of Cambodia, now Phnom Penh International Airport, Rindaro decided to leave for Vietnam and work at Ho Chi Minh City's airport for three years.

== Career ==
=== Early success ===
Upon returning home from Ho Chi Minh City in 1987, he was stopped by another driver who was an owner of film production company. He knew Rindaro from Battambang province. Because his look was similar to a certain Cambodian actor who was famous at that time, he was offered a role in a film Secret Tears in the Quiet Purple Night. With no acting training, his ability to act naturally came merely from other films he watched and his own imagination. Although he had been promised to, Rindaro in fact never got paid for his acting in his first film. The film did not end up successful, but Rindaro gathered attention of other producers. He was later offered roles in other films such as Bopha Phnom Penh by Fai Sam Ang or Arkambang Kechsanya. In later films, he for the first time met actress Ampor Tevi, who then became his most common acting partner for more than decade. During the early 1990s, he starred in more than ten movies per year. In 1994, he was cast in Peasants in Distress, a drama film written and directed by the ruling king Norodom Sihanouk. As one of the most famous Cambodian celebrities of that time, Tep Rindaro with some other local celebrities attended a tour to the United States of America, which has a large community of Cambodians who fled during the Khmer Rouge era.

=== Later career ===
During the late 1990s, Cambodian cinema suffered from lack of funding and interest from producers, Tep Rindaro started to act in karaoke music videos. Some of them were with Dy Saveth, one of the most popular actresses of pre-Khmer Rouge cinema. Until 2001, all films made in Cambodia were cheap productions released directly as videotapes; however, this changed when Fai Sam Ang directed a Cambodia-Thai horror film The Snake King's Child, based on a famous Khmer legend about Snake King. This first-ever full-length feature film for cinema to be produced in Cambodia since 1975 featured Thai leading man Winai Kraibutr, and Tep Rindaro was offered a role of Snake King, with his longtime acting partner Ampor Tevi as his lover. This was also the last collaboration of this famous pair on screen, as Ampor Tevi sometime after release ended her acting career and moved to the USA. After a big success of The Snake King's Child, Tep Rindaro continued acting in more films and karaoke videos, and was offered a role in some Norodom Sihanouk productions, like a comedy film Lon Nol Lon Non Lonnoliens, and dramas Arsina, Le Cid Khmer and La Chatelaine de Banareath. Since 2010, he starred in some Khmer Mekong Films TV series, such as AirWaves, Beauty of Life, and My Family My Heart.

== Personal life ==
Tep Rindaro got married in 1987, a marriage arranged by parents of both sides. They had one daughter, but the relationship lasted for only one year, before the couple got divorced in 1988. Shortly after that, his ex-wife and daughter left Cambodia and are now living abroad. He never got married again, but he has been taking care of two children of his deceased sister.

== Awards ==
In 2005, he was awarded with a Certificate of Appreciation from Princess Bopha Devi on behalf of the Ministry of Culture and Fine Arts and also received Royal Officer rank called Sina. Later, he was promoted by the King Norodom Sihamoni to a higher rank of Sina Mony Sophon. In 2012, he acquired Empire of Star Award.

== Other activities ==
He is the owner of a coffee bar in the town of Siem Reap in western Cambodia.

== Partial filmography ==
Year	Movie	Role	Other notes
1987	Secret Tear in the Quiet Purple Night		
1990	Ark Kambang Kech Sanyar		
1991	Bong'aem Jivit		
1992	Jam Bong Komloss Sen		
1992	Kat Besdong Deumbey Bong	Pisitt	
1992	Kdam Srae		
1992	Pich Min Tonn Chnai		
1992	Som Hauy Loke Pdei		
1993	Chan Krefah		
1993	Chnam Oun 16		Musical skit "1 Kumpleang Anuksavary" alongside Pisith Pilika
1993	Jrolom Knhom Heuy		
1993	Kakei		
1993	Kmouch Beisach Nei Propun Jea Tee Snaeha Roboss Knhom		
1993	Pov Malis Lea		
1993	Preah Vesandor	Preah Vesandor	
1993	Rehu Chap Chan		
1993	Sak Meul Sen		
1993	Sman Ta Kronn		
1993	Sronoss Klen Srae Maóm		Musical Skit "Robam Kane" alongside Pisith Pilika
1993	Tam Ton Chon Kaeng		
1994	Bopha Puos Vaek		
1994	Cheung Mek Dach Sroyal		
1994	Chong Sroll		
1994	Kon Krok Vetamean		
1994	Ondeuk Meas		
1994	Ondat Doh Chaúng		
1994	Promat Promong		
1994	Peasants In Distress(Directed by King Norodom Sihanouk)		
1995	Pka Angkeabos		
1995	Preah Moha Monkoline		
1995	Prolung Areak Ontheak Nesai		
2001	The Snake King's Child		
2002	Neak Mdai		
2002	Neang Sok Kra'op		
2002	Meayea Satrey		
2002	Mea Yeung		18 minutes long excluding songs
2002	A Kwak A Kwen		
2002	Pka Dos Leu Tmaw		
Sovann Ten On		15 minutes long excluding songs	
2003	Poumakris Chomlaek (The Weird Villa)		
2004	Att 3(3 Ace)		
2004	Mea Yeung		Tep Rindaro's second version in full length
2004	Snae Muoy Meun Snae(Love 10,000 Times)		
2004	Mohetjata		
2005	Osschja Nah Loke Pdey		
2005	Teuk Chet Ovpuok (The Love of a Father)		
2006	The Blind and The Crippled		
2006	Sromoul Snae Sitha		
2006	Teacher's Heart		
2006	Neay Tong Neay Sanh		Comedy Skit
2006	Ruos Nov Rit Tae Ossjah		Comedy Skit
2007	Boross Jak Smok		
2008	Komnum Pi Adetacheat		
2008	Scales of Justice 1 (Khmer: ជញ្ជីងគ្មានស្រមោល ១)	Chamnan	Edutainment Series produced by the Women's Media Centre of Cambodia (WMC)
2009	Srov Krao Srae		series
2009	Pka Ma'om		series
2009	Scales of Justice 2 (Khmer: ជញ្ជីងគ្មានស្រមោល ២)	Chamnan	Edutainment Series produced by The Women's Media Centre of Cambodia (WMC)
2010	Scales of Justice 3&4 (Khmer: ជញ្ជីងគ្មានស្រមោល ៣&៤)	Chamnan	Edutainment Series produced by the Women's Media Centre of Cambodia (WMC)]
2019	The Clock: Spirits Awakening	Doctor	LD Entertainment KH
2022	Single Dad (film)	Father	LD Entertainment KH
2022	My Hero Teacher	Father	
2022	Choub Soy 3	Father	LD Entertainment KH
2023	Wishing Lollipop	Doctor	LD Entertainment KH
2023	Give My Last Hello	Father	LD Entertainment KH
2023	Single Dad 2	Father	LD Entertainment KH
2023	Rent Boy (2023 film)	Father	LD Entertainment KH
2024	Neath's Love Story: Post Angkor Youth	Father	LD Entertainment KH
2025	Grandpa 21	Son and Father	LD Entertainment KH
2025	Her Deadly Eyes	Daddy	Tiny Film Production
2025	The Mirror	Daddy	Mediaload Pictures
2025	Sugarcane Baby	Doctor	J3 Studio
2026	The Old Man (2026 film)	Ta Ro	LD Entertainment KH
2026	The Shelterless	Father	Unifilm

== Tv Show Appearance ==
- Angkorwat Show-with Sim Solika (2008)
- Lakoun Kropeu Charavan-with Chon Chan Leakenna (2008)
- Yup Kondal Tngai-Night During Daytime(A Story Depicting the Khmer Rouge Years) with Chon Chan Leakenna(2008)
