= Angkor DC =

Cambodia video streaming service

- Screenshot
- Website type: OTT streaming platform
- Headquarters: Phnom Penh, Cambodia
- Country of origin: Cambodia
- Area served: Worldwide
- Founders: Leak Lyda (Chairman and founder); Sok Lin (Chief executive officer)
- Products: Streaming media; digital distribution
- Website: angkordc.com
- Registration: Required
- Launched: July 1, 2021; 5 years ago
- Current status: Active

Angkor Digital Cinema (abbreviated to ADC or Angkor DC, Khmer: អង្គរ ឌីស៊ី), is a Cambodian streaming service. It is the first digital company in Cambodia and features various films, including The Clock: Spirits Awakening, Rent Boy, The Night Curse of Reatrei and Mannequin Wedding.
