= Blood Border: Cambodia's 2nd Killing Fields =

2026 film by Leak Lyda

- សោកនាដកម្មភ្នំខ្មោច
- Directed by: Leak Lyda
- Screenplay by: Leak Lyda; Say Veacha; Nuon Molin
- Based on: Dangrek Mountain... unforgettable by Mengly J. Quach
- Produced by: Leak Lyna
- Production companies: LD Entertainment KH; LD Picture Production
- Running time: 100 minutes
- Country: Cambodia
- Languages: Khmer; Thai; English

Blood Border: Cambodia's 2nd Killing Fields (Khmer: សោកនាដកម្មភ្នំខ្មោច) is an upcoming Cambodian biographical drama thriller film based on the memories of Mengly J. Quach, who was forced down the Dângrêk Mountains by Thai soldiers in 1979. The film is directed by Leak Lyda. A film about the second Killing Fields in Cambodia during the Dangrek Incident.

== Premise ==
After the fall of the Khmer Rouge in 1979, tens of thousands of Cambodians fled to the Thai border hoping to resettle in a third country. Tragically, Thai soldiers drove the refugees to the Dângrêk Mountains and forced them down a steep gorge into minefields, resulting in thousands of deaths.

== Cast ==
- Nov Dana
- Vath Vaheang
- Laurence Hamilton
- Sou Rathanak

== Production ==
In January 2026, it was announced on the first day of filming that production costs would total $25,556.

Mr.Rath Sreang, Deputy Commander of the Royal Cambodian Military Police and Commander of the Phnom Penh Royal Cambodian Military Police, provided firearms, specialized equipment, and a team of experts to support the filming.

The production of Blood Border: Cambodia's 2nd Killing Fields drew significant criticism from various Thai media outlets during its filming.

The film was shot in Kirirom National Park from January to April 2026.

== Release ==
The film will release in all theaters across Cambodia this November 2026. When the scheduled release date arrived, the film was not released. Mr. Leak Lyda posted an emotional message about the situation without explaining why the screening was canceled. The screening of this film has been postponed due to technical issues.

== Reception ==
On July 15, 2026, director Leak Lyda released the film's teaser, which garnered massive support and amassed 1 million views in just 24 hours.The site is the subject of the 2020 documentary film Ghost Mountain: The Second Killing Fields of Cambodia, produced by the Preah Vihear Foundation. In 2026, LD Entertainment released a feature film, Blood Border: Cambodia's 2nd Killing Fields, based on the same location.
