= The Old Man (2026 film) =

2026 film by Somchanrith Chap

- ចាស់កំព្រា
- Directed by: Somchanrith Chap
- Screenplay by: Say Veacha
- Produced by: Leak Lyna
- Production companies: LD Entertainment KH; LD Picture Production
- Release date: March 12, 2026 (Cambodia)
- Running time: 98 min.
- Country: Cambodia
- Language: Khmer
- Box office: $850,000

The Old Man (Khmer: ចាស់កំព្រា, Chas Kom Prea; transl. Lonely Old Man) is a 2026 Cambodian drama comedy film directed by Somchanrith Chap in his directorial debut and written by Say Veacha.

The Old Man has become the most pre-booked movie of 2026. The film was released theatrically on March 12 and received positive reviews from critics for its powerful performances.The film became Cambodia's highest-grossing of 2026. The Old Man won several accolades at the 2026 Legend Awards, including Best Film.

== Plot ==
When a lonely widower realizes his grown children have phased him out of their lives, he stages an elaborate deception to lure them back to their childhood home, forcing a confrontation with the family's fractured past.

== Cast ==
- Tep Rindaro
- Bun Kevan
- Taing Meng
- Bella Danith
- Hailey Pheng
- Som Sary
- Lucci Lucci

== Release ==
=== Theatrical ===
The film's first release date is March 12, 2026. The film ran in theaters for 42 days, the longest run for a Cambodian film.

== Screenings ==
The Old Man was selected to screen at the closing ceremony of the 15th Cambodia International Film Festival.

The film was selected to be screened at the China-Cambodia Film & Cultural Exchange Week 2026 in Fuzhou, China.

The film was officially selected for the 12th Cambodia Town Film Festival in Long Beach, California and 5th Lowell Asian American Film Festival in Lowell, Massachusetts.

The 14th Asian Film Festival Barcelona, held in Spain, selected the film for its competition lineup in the NETPAC Section.

The film was selected as part of the 17th Kota Kinabalu International Film Festival's Cinebalu Screenings in Malaysia.

The film was officially selected for the 2026 Minsk International Film Festival Listapad in Belarus.

This film has been selected for the 8th Lancang-Mekong International Film Week in Laos.

== Awards and nominations ==
Year	Award	Category	Recipient	Result
2026	Legend Awards	Best Film	Somchanrith Chap	Won
2026	Legend Awards	Best New Director	Somchanrith Chap	Won
2026	Legend Awards	Best Script	Veacha Say	Won
2026	Legend Awards	Best Actor	Tep Rindaro	Won
2026	Legend Awards	Top Performance International Award	Somchanrith Chap	Won
2026	Legend Awards	Audience Choice	Somchanrith Chap	Nominated
2026	Cambodia Town Film Festival	Best Feature Film	Somchanrith Chap	Won
2026	Lancang-Mekong International Film Week (Golden Elephant Honor)	Outstanding Film	Somchanrith Chap	Won

== Reception ==
The Cambodia Oscar Selection Committee (COSC) founder Mariam Arthur pointed to a wider field than usual this year, saying there are typically only one or two eligible films. Highlighting Chap Somchanrith’s The Old Man as a notable entry, Arthur called it “a huge step forward that Khmer filmmakers are willing to invest in drama and romance genres.
