= Diep Sela =

Cambodian film director

- ឌៀប សិលា
- Born: February 6, 1993 (age 33); Siem Reap province, Cambodia
- Occupation: Film director
- Years active: 2012-present
- Known for: Mannequin Wedding and The Night Curse of Reatrei

Diep Sela is a Cambodian filmmaker. He is the director of Mannequin Wedding and The Night Curse of Reatrei. These two films have become the highest-grossing Khmer films in Cambodia.

== Films ==
- Maly
- The Night Curse of Reatrei
- The Ritual Soul
- Dear Mother Ghost
- Unwelcome Home
- The Last Home
- Mannequin Wedding
- Book of Evil
- The Ladies
- Hotel 2005
- The Ghost Who Stayed to Get Married

== Film Festival ==
- The Night Curse of Reatrei was official selected to participate in the 13th Cambodia International Film Festival, 2nd Cambodia Town Film Festival, 10th Cambodia Asian Film Festival and 11th Luang Prabang Film Festival.
- Mannequin Wedding was official selected to 3rd Cambodia Asian Film Festival. The film officially selected as Cambodia’s entry for the prestigious Golden Petrel Award at 2nd Asian Art Film Festival in Macau. The film has been officially selected for the 15th Cambodia International Film Festival.
