= Neath's Love Story: Tomorrow Again =

Cambodia romance comedy film

Neath's Love Story: Chapter 2 Tomorrow Again
- ប្រវត្តិស្នេហ៍នាងនាថ វគ្គ២ ជើងមេឃពណ៌ស្វាយ
- Directed by: Leak Lyda
- Written by: Leak Lyda; Diep Sovanndara
- Produced by: Leak Lyna
- Starring: Paing Takhon; Mélia Constantin; Ngoun Soben; Chea Sovannorea
- Cinematography: Him Thideth
- Production companies: LD Entertainment KH; LD Picture Production
- Release date: 19 September 2024 (Cambodia)
- Running time: 106 min.
- Country: Cambodia
- Language: Khmer

Neath's Love Story 2 (Khmer: ប្រវត្តិស្នេហ៍នាងនាថ វគ្គ២, Pro Wat Sneh Neang Neath; transl. Neath's Love Story) is a 2024 Cambodian romance comedy film directed by Leak Lyda and written by Diep Sovanndara. It is a sequel to Neath's Love Story: Post Angkor Youth.

The first Khmer film to be produced has three sequels completed at a cost of $1 million.

== Plot ==
Neang Neath was accused by the villagers of being involved with the bandits after her husband went to hide. Leader Vong attempted to assault her until she died, while Dao was hiding until he was victorious.

== Cast ==
- Paing Takhon
- Mélia Constantin
- Ngoun Soben
- Chea Sovannorea
- Dj. Kaka
- Sorn Piseth
- Chem Chanra
- Choronai Pich

== Awards and nominations ==
Year	Award	Category	Recipient	Result	Ref.
2026	Cambodia Asian Film Festival (Golden Rumdul Awards)	Best Cinematographer	Him Thydet	Won	
