= Un Bunthoeurn =

Cambodian film director

- អ៊ុន ប៊ុនធឿន
- Born: April 5, 1990 (age 36); Battambang province, Cambodia
- Occupation: Film director
- Years active: 2012-present
- Known for: Wishing Lollipop

Un Bunthoeurn is a Cambodian filmmaker. He is the director of Wishing Lollipop, a Khmer-language feature film and head post production at LD Entertainment KH.

== Films ==
- Hammock
- Hello Neighbor
- Wishing Lollipop
- Give My Last Hello
- Photocopy
- Mr.Goodman
- Pacha
- Junior Camper
- Alone in the Darkness
- Sleeping on Mother's Grave

== Producer ==
- Sugarcane Baby

== Film Festival ==
His film 'Wishing Lollipop' was official selected to participate in the Cambodia International Film Festival and Lancang-Mekong International Film Week.
