= The Night Curse of Reatrei =

Cambodia horror film

- Theatrical release Poster
- បណ្ដាសានាងរាត្រី
- Directed by: Leak Lyda
- Written by: Nuon Molin; Vuth Oudom
- Produced by: Leak Lyna
- Starring: Norodom Jenna; Paing Takhon; Shin Yubin; Tharoth Sam; Sahrah Pich Manika
- Cinematography: Alex Dacev
- Edited by: Ken Simpson; Diep Sela; Sam Oudom
- Music by: Chap Khun Heng
- Production companies: LD Entertainment KH; LD Picture Production; Real Bros Production
- Distributed by: Exponenta Film (Russia and CIS); Cai Chang International (Taiwan); MVP (Indonesia and Timor-Leste); Real Bros Production (Myanmar)
- Release dates: March 14, 2024 (Cambodia); September 12, 2024 (Russia); June 14, 2024 (Taiwan)
- Running time: 95 min.
- Countries: Cambodia; Myanmar
- Language: Khmer
- Budget: $380,000
- Box office: $2 million

The Night Curse of Reatrei (Khmer: បណ្ដាសានាងរាត្រី, Bon Das Sa Neang Reatrei; transl. The Curse of Lady Night) is a 2024 Cambodian horror mystery film directed by Leak Lyda and written by Nuon Molin.

It is a Cambodia-Myanmar venture produced by LD Picture Production and Real Bros Production. Starring Tharoth Sam, princess Norodom Jenna and Paing Takhon and distributed by Skyline Media, a leading Vietnamese studio.

It made a record of being the highest-grossing Cambodian horror film of 2024, the highest-grossing foreign film of 2024 in Myanmar, the highest-grossing Cambodian film of all time in Taiwan, and the second highest-grossing Cambodia film in Russia.

== Plot ==
1993, After moving into an abandoned orphanage, they realize that the whole building was cursed by a vengeful spirit, Reatrei. Tragedies start to happen one after another until they find what her curse wants.

== Cast ==
=== Main ===
- Norodom Jenna as Gechly
- Paing Takhon as Paing
- Shin Yubin as Dalin

=== Supporting ===
- Tharoth Sam as Pisey
- Money Reaksa as Reatrie
- Sahrah Pich Manika as Nika
- Ieb Brospich as Pheak
- Sim Sopheakmoney as Tra
- Oum Vuthychey as Soum

=== Others ===
- Sokhey Botthida as Nita (Girl)
- Duang Chansopeaktra as Veacha
- Keo Somaly as Yim
- Keo Rotha as Kru

=== Special appearances ===
- Nov Dana as Nita (Woman)
- Ear Sinan as Phat

== Screenings ==
Variety Skyline Media, a leading Vietnamese studio, bring The Night Curse of Reatrie to Marché du film 2024 with a string of sales on its local and Southeast Asian film sales slate. Since appearing at FilMart in Hong Kong in March, Skyline has licensed the Cambodian horror title The Night Curse of Reatrei to Taiwan's Cai Chang International and to Exponenta Film for the Commonwealth of Independent States. The Night Curse of Reatrei was released in Myanmar, Taiwan, Timor Leste, Indonesia, Russia, Uzbekistan, Tajikistan, Kyrgyzstan, Belarus and Kazakhstan.

The Night Curse of Reatrie was included as part of "Scary Worlds" at the 13th Cambodia International Film Festival.

The film was selected as the Cambodian entry for the "Golden Rumdul Award" at the 2nd Cambodia Asian Film Festival, and made the July shortlist (CAFF).

The film has an official selection at the 10th Cambodia Town Film Festival (CTFF), Cambodia Town, Long Beach, California.

The film was presented at Asian Contents & Film Market (ACFM) 2024 in South Korea.

The film has an official selection at the 11th Blue Chair Film Festival 2024 in Luang Prabang, Laos.

The film has secured a spot on the March shortlist for the main competition at the 2nd Asian Art Film Festival in Macau, having been officially selected as Cambodia’s entry for the prestigious Golden Petrel Awards.

== Release ==
=== Theatrical ===
- The film's first release date is March 14, 2024. It made a record of being Cambodia's highest-grossing horror film of all times.
- May 3, 2024. It made a record of being the highest-grossing foreign film of 2024 in Myanmar.
- Film is set to be widely released in theaters in Taiwan June 14, 2024 and being the first Khmer movie, it made $NT1 Million in Taiwan, surpassing Thai film Love You to Debt and Sting
- June 26, 2024 released only in theatre Platinum Cineplex Indonesia and Timor Leste, same day with A Quiet Place: Day One.
- September 5, 2024 released in theaters in Uzbekistan.
- September 12, 2024 released in theaters in Russia, Tajikistan, Kyrgyzstan and Belarus.
- September 19, 2024 released in theaters in Kazakhstan.

=== Home media ===
The film was available on Apple TV+, Google Play, MyVideo and HamiVideo in Taiwan.

The film was available on Apple TV+, OKKO and Wink in Russia.

The film was released for digital download, on Ultra HD Blu-ray, Blu-ray, and DVD by Cai Chang International.

The film was released on Angkor DC.

The film was released on Canal+ (Myanmar).

== Awards and nominations ==
Year	Award	Category	Recipient	Result	Ref.
2024	2nd Cambodia Asian Film Festival (Golden Rumdul Awards)	Best Actress	Shin Yubin	Won	
2024	2nd Cambodia Asian Film Festival (Golden Rumdul Awards)	Best Newcomer	Norodom Jenna	Won	
2024	10th Cambodia Town Film Festival	Rising Star Award	Norodom Jenna	Won	

== Reception ==
The Cambodian horror film The Night Curse of Reatrie is adapted from real events, and its horror atmosphere is comparable to It (2017 film) and The Conjuring. Expanding its reach, LD Productions has screened films in over 10 countries, adding three more destinations this year. Since the success of The Clock: Spirits Awakening. It received a high score of 8.7 on IMDb. . References
