= Norodom Jenna =

Cambodian princess and actress (born 2012)

Norodom Jenna នរោត្តម ចេណ្ណា
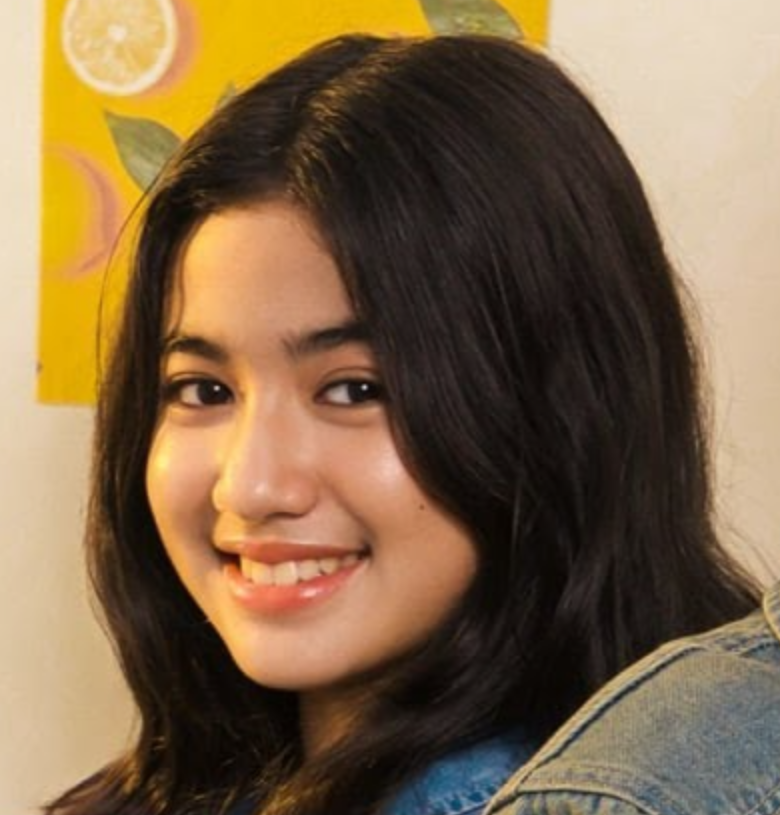
- Jenna in 2022
- Born: 11 March 2012 (age 14); Paris, France
- House: Norodom
- Father: Unknown
- Mother: Norodom Bophary
- Religion: Theravada Buddhism
- Occupation: Princess; actress; singer; dancer; model
- Norodom Jenna's voice Norodom Jenna singing You Da One at a live concert Recorded in late 2022 Musical career
- Labels: NCJ Empire Studio - Record Label (until 2021); K've Entertainment (2022–2024); Independent (2025–)

Styles of Norodom Jenna
- Reference style: Her Royal Highness
- Spoken style: Your Royal Highness

Norodom Jenna (Khmer: នរោត្តម ចេណ្ណា, Nôroŭttâm Chénna [nɔroːɗɑm ceːnnaː], often spelled នរោត្តម ជេនណា on social media; born 11 March 2012) is a member of the Cambodian royal family. She is the grandniece of King Norodom Sihamoni, the second daughter of Princess Norodom Bophary and great-granddaughter of King Norodom Sihanouk. Jenna is also an actress, singer, dancer, model, and former Cellcard's Royal Brand Ambassador. King Norodom Sihamoni elevated Princess Norodom Jenna to the title of Her Highness Princess Norodom Jenna (Khmer: អ្នកអង្គម្ចាស់ក្សត្រិយ៍ នរោត្តម ចេណ្ណា).

== Biography ==
Norodom Jenna was born on 11 March 2012 in Paris. She is the second daughter of Princess Norodom Bophary, a granddaughter of Prince Norodom Chakrapong and a great-granddaughter of King Norodom Sihanouk.

In 2015, she and her family returned to Cambodia. She has command of four languages including her native Khmer, as well as English, French and Chinese.

Jenna has denied rumours of joining the K-pop scene, preferring to focus on projects that benefit Cambodians.

== Achievements ==
- Royal Brand Ambassador of Cellcard Telecommunications Company (Cambodia).
- Royal Brand Ambassador of Marie Regal (Indonesia).
- Royal Brand Ambassador of R&F Properties (China).
- Royal Brand Ambassador of Cambodia's Dance Sport Federation (Cambodia)
- Actress on CTN Television Drama Series.
- Royal Brand Ambassador - OPPO Cambodia
- Royal Brand Ambassador - ZEEKR Cambodia
- Space Creative Marketing - Talent Management (Cambodia)
- Royal Ambassador- Miss Cosmo Cambodia
- Best Newcomer Actress - Cambodia Asian Film Festival 2024
- Role model Hall of Fame - HOFS Awards 2025

== Filmography ==
=== Television ===
Year	Title		Network	Ref.
Year	English	Original	Network	Ref.
2020	Tep Thida Pkol Meas	ទេពធីតាព្កុលមាស	CTN	
2021	Golden Kingdom	នគរមាស	CTN	

=== Films ===
Year	Title		Network	Ref.
Year	English	Original	Network	Ref.
2024	The Night Curse of Reatrei	បណ្ដាសានាងរាត្រី	LD Entertainment	

== See also ==
- House of Norodom
- Family tree of Cambodian monarchs
