= Paing Takhon =

Burmese model, actor, and singer (born 1996)

- ပိုင်တံခွန်
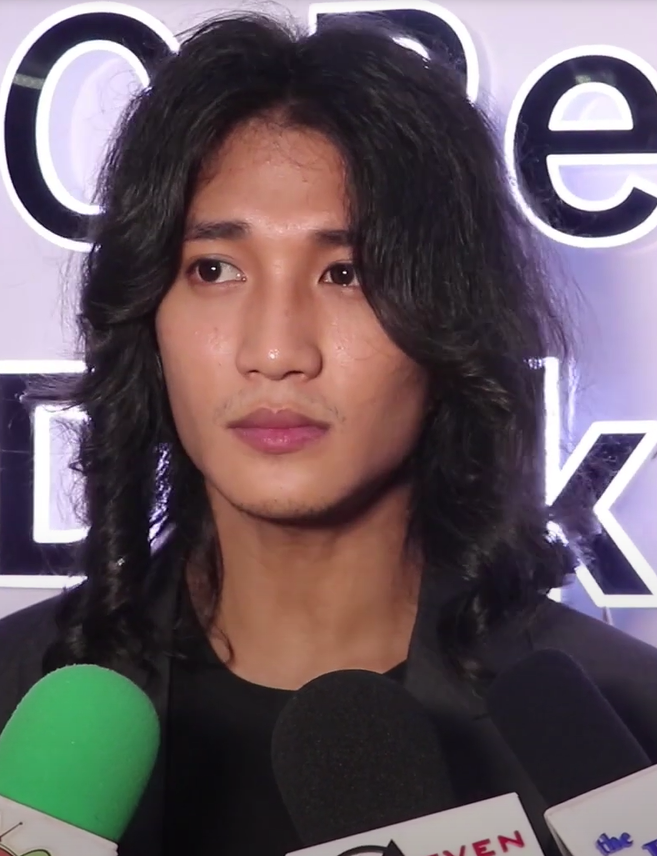
- Paing Takhon in 2019
- Born: Sit Ko Paing စစ်ကိုပိုင် 17 September 1996 (age 30); Kawthaung, Myanmar
- Education: University of Distance Education, Yangon
- Occupations: Model; actor; singer
- Years active: 2014–present

Paing Takhon (Burmese: ပိုင်တံခွန် [pàɪɰ̃ dəgʊ̀ɰ̃]; born 17 September 1996) is a Burmese model, actor, and singer. He began his entertainment career in 2014 as a runway model. He is also one of the few Burmese celebrities with an international profile, given the country only began opening up to the outside world over the last decade.

In 2018, Paing Takhon featured on the BuzzFeed's "23 Stunning South Asian Men That Are Too Gorgeous For Words". In 2019, he was listed on The Myanmar Times "Top 10 Actors".

== Early life and education ==
Paing Takhon was born Sit Ko Paing (Burmese: စစ်ကိုပိုင်) on 17 September 1996 in Kawthaung, Tanintharyi Region, Myanmar, to Tun Moe and his wife, Khin Kyu. He grew up in Khamaukgyi. He is the fourth child of six siblings, having an elder brother, two elder sisters and two younger brothers. He graduated high school from Basic Education High School No. 1 Khamaukgyi. In 2014, he moved to Yangon to become a model. In 2017, he began studying psychology at the University of Distance Education, Yangon.

== Career ==
He joined John Lwin's model training program in 2014 and subsequently received professional training in modeling and runway walking. He began his career as a runway model with John Lwin's Star & Model International Modeling Agency, participating in numerous fashion shows and advertisements. This led to opportunities in television and DVD commercials. He has also appeared in various music videos and featured as a fashion model on magazine covers. His work in modeling and commercials gained attention from the film industry, leading to acting opportunities in movies.

In 2016, he traveled to Indonesia to participate in the "ASEAN Celebrity Explore Quest Malaysia 2016" (ACEQM) alongside Nan Su Yati Soe as a representative from Myanmar. The event brought together well-known celebrities and models from various Southeast Asian countries. As part of the event, they performed the U Shwe Yoe and Daw Moe dance.

Rising to fame in 2017, he received film offers and signed contracts for three films.

He starred in the web films Thaman Kyar (Weretiger) in 2018 and Bal Thu Lal (WHO) in 2019, which was released online and aired on Sky Net DTH for free. In 2019, he participated in the documentary TV program Kha Yee Thwar Kauk Kyaung (Traveller's Notes) alongside Thinzar Wint Kyaw.

By 2019, he had gained popularity in Thailand, which was rare for a celebrity from Myanmar. On 3 August 2019, he hosted a grand fan meeting in Bangkok, Thailand, drawing a large crowd of supporters. He also appeared in several commercial endorsements and soap operas in Thailand. Additionally, he served as an ASEAN Economic Community ambassador. On 21 September 2019, he was appointed as Myanmar's tourism ambassador to Thailand by the Myanmar Tourism Marketing Association in collaboration with the Myanmar Tourism Federation. He was ranked No. 10 on TC Candler's list of the "100 Most Handsome Faces of 2020".

In January 2021, Paing Takhon gained international attention after a viral Instagram photo showed him with a shaved head and wearing a saffron robe during a 10-day stint as a monk, which led to him being dubbed the "hot monk" and significantly increased his follower count to 1.1 million in a short time. In December 2021, he was ranked #1 in "The 100 Most Handsome Faces of 2021" list issued by TC Candler.

He made his big-screen debut in the 2022 film Dark Fall. However, the film was not widely screened in cinemas due to the political turmoil and situation following the 2021 Myanmar coup d'état. His second big-screen film, Kan Kaung, explores the deep bond of compassion between a dog and a human. The film was a major box office success in Myanmar, earning him a nomination for the Myanmar Academy Award for Best Actor and winning three Myanmar Academy Awards in 2023, along with several international film awards. It has also been screened overseas, including in Thailand, Cambodia, Vietnam, and South Korea. Paing Takhon received praise for his performance in the film and won the Best Actor award at the SEA International Film Festival 2024.

He made his foreign film debut in the 2023 Cambodian film Rent Boy, followed by The Night Curse of Reatrei in 2024. The film became the highest-grossing Cambodian horror film of 2024, the highest-grossing foreign film of the year in Myanmar, and the highest-grossing Cambodian film of all time in Taiwan. Following this success, five of his Cambodian films were screened in 2024.

== Music career ==
Paing Takhon began his singing career in 2017 and released his debut solo album "Chit Thu" (Lover) on 16 September 2017. He donated all the proceeds from album sales to support orphaned children at Ananda Metta Orphan School.

== Brand ambassadorships ==
He is also known as the face of many brands. His first brand worked as the ambassador for Pond's Myanmar in 2014. In 2019, he started working as brand ambassador for major brands such as Oppo Myanmar, Telenor Myanmar, Sunkist Myanmar, T247 energy drink, MG Vehicles Myanmar and Sailun Tire Myanmar.

== Business ==
Paing Takhon is a business partner and share holder of the United Amara Bank. He is also the founder of a beauty product company.

== Political activities ==
Following the 2021 Myanmar coup d'état, Paing Takhon was active in the anti-coup movement both in person at rallies and through social media. Denouncing the military coup, he has taken part in protests since February. He joined the "We Want Justice" three-finger salute movement. The movement was launched on social media, and many celebrities have joined the movement.

On 7 April 2021, warrants for his arrest were issued under section 505 (a) of the Myanmar Penal Code by the State Administration Council for speaking out against the military coup. Along with several other celebrities, he was charged with calling for participation in the Civil Disobedience Movement (CDM) and damaging the state's ability to govern, with supporting the Committee Representing Pyidaungsu Hluttaw, and with generally inciting the people to disturb the peace and stability of the nation.

On 8 April 2021, he was arrested and taken into custody in the North Dagon area of Yangon at 5:00 am from his mother's home, according to local media reports. He was suffering from cerebral malaria and congenital diseases including coronary heart disease and asthma at the time when he was arrested. He was sentenced to three years of hard labor. He was released from Insein Prison under a state pardon on 2 March 2022 after agreeing to collaborate with the military. In April 2023, Takhon performed for the military at Myanmar Thingyan Festival and was subsequently boycotted.

== Personal life ==
On 29 December 2024, Paing Takhon became engaged to his longtime partner, Linn Myat Phu, after four years together. Linn Myat Phu, a private citizen, is the daughter of San Linn, an oil tycoon and chairman of the Myanmar Edible Oil Dealers' Association (MEODA).

== Filmography ==
=== Film ===
| Year | Film | Role | Notes | Ref. |
|---|---|---|---|---|
| 2022 | Dark Fall | | Debut film | |
| 2023 | Kan Kaung | | | |
| 2023 | Rent Boy | | | |
| 2024 | Shwe Phoo Sar | | | |
| 2024 | The Night Curse of Reatrei | | | |
| 2024 | Neath's Love Story: Post Angkor Youth | | | |
| 2024 | Neath's Love Story: Tomorrow Again | | | |
| 2024 | Neath's Love Story 3 | | | |

=== Web Film ===
| Year | English title | Burmese title | Notes |
|---|---|---|---|
| 2018 | Thaman Kyar | သမန်းကျား | English: "Weretiger" |
| 2019 | Bal Thu Lal | ဘယ်သူလဲ | English: "WHO" |

== Discography ==
=== Solo albums ===
- Chit Thu (Lover (ချစ်သူ) (2016)

== Awards and nominations ==
| Year | Award | Category | Nominated work | Result |
|---|---|---|---|---|
| 2023 | Myanmar Academy Award | Best Actor | Kan Kaung | Nominated |
| 2024 | SEA International Film Festival | Best Actor | Kan Kaung | Won |
