= Single Dad (film) =

Cambodia comedy film

Single Dad (2022 film)
- លោកប៉ាមហាកូរ
- Directed by: Diep Sovanndara
- Written by: Diep Sovanndara
- Produced by: Leak Lyna
- Starring: Tep Rindaro; Bros Khouch; Heng Chantha; Oum Sovankiri
- Cinematography: Sok Leng
- Production companies: LD Entertainment KH; LD Picture Production; DreamTeam Pictures
- Release date: 21 July 2022 (Cambodia)
- Running time: 87 min.
- Country: Cambodia
- Language: Khmer

Single Dad (Khmer: លោកប៉ាមហាកូរ, Lok Pa Moha Ko; transl. Single Dad) is a 2022 Cambodian romantic comedy film directed and written by Diep Sovanndara.

The film's first release date is July 21, 2022. It made a record of being Cambodia's highest-grossing Rom-Com film of all times.

== Plot ==
A single 30 year old boy is still living with his parents, living with them like friends. His dad wants to help him find a girl. The father-son relationship seems to be a little broken when the son refuses to have any girlfriend. His dad decides to do everything to help his son find a girl and become his seduction teacher.

== Cast ==
- Tep Rindaro
- Pros Khouch
- Heng Chantha
- Oum Sovankiri
- Kong Somanita

== Sequel ==
"Single Dad" really received a lot of support, so we created the second part of the story, "Single Dad II," in which the child has to repay the gratitude, care, and fulfill the wishes of the father.

== Screening ==
The film also was screened at the 11th Cambodia International Film Festival.
