= Dangrek Incident =

1979 Thai-Cambodian border incident

Dangrek incident
- Part of Cambodian–Vietnamese War, and Cambodian humanitarian crisis
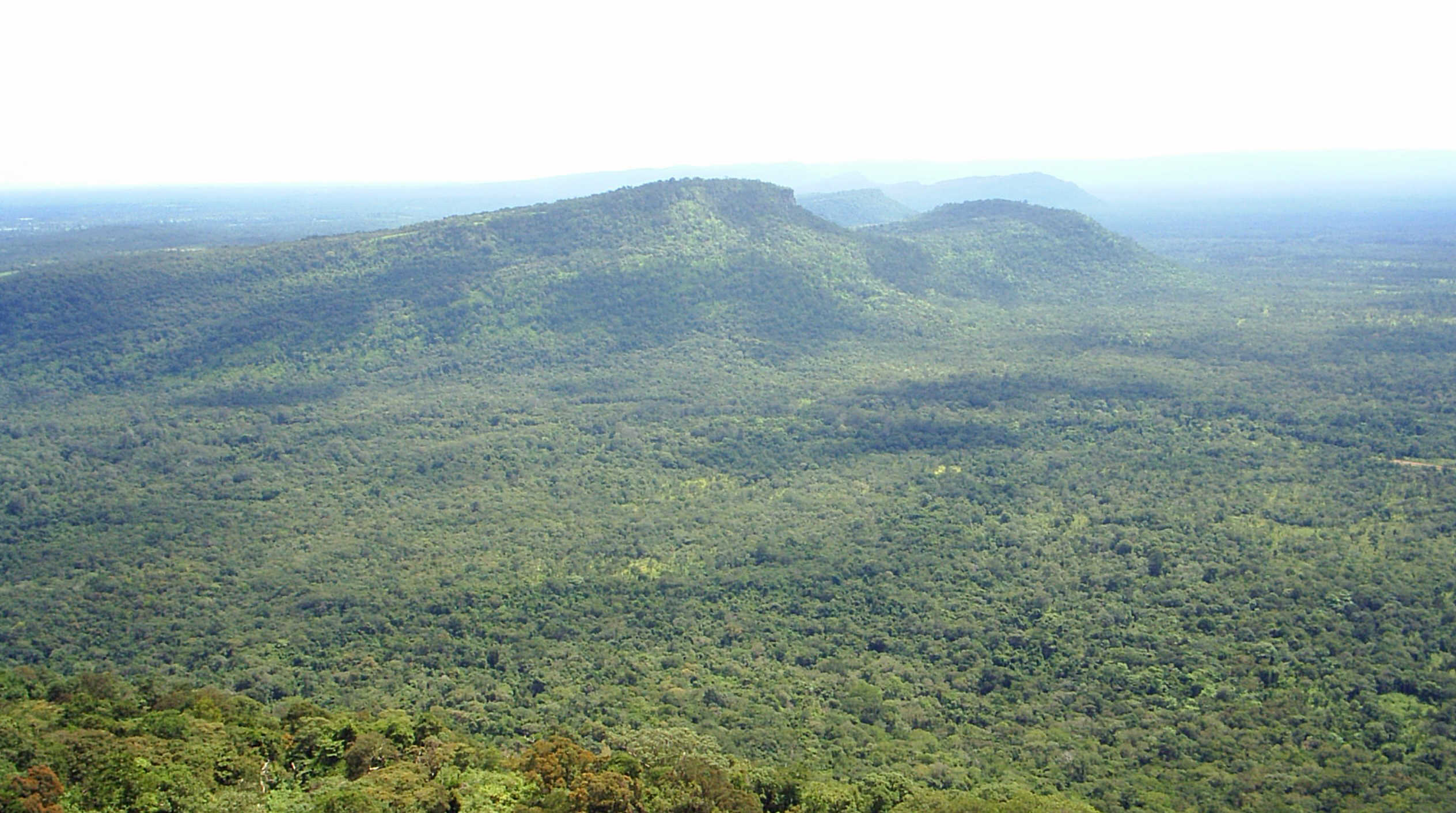
- Dangrek Mountain Range
- Location: Cambodia–Thailand border, Dângrêk Mountains
- Date: 8-15 June 1979
- Target: Cambodian refugees in Thailand
- Attack type: Death March, massacre
- Deaths: 3,000-10,000+
- Perpetrators: Royal Thai Armed Forces, Thai border authorities

The Dangrek Incident, also known as the Preah Vihear Massacre, or Preah Vihear massacre, was the June 1979 systematic, forced repatriation of 42,000–45,000 Cambodian refugees (mostly women and children) by the Thai military. It resulted in from 3,000 to over 10,000 deaths from landmines, shootings, falls off cliffs, exposure, and disease. Transpiring near Cambodia's 11th–12th century Khmer Preah Vihear temple in the Dângrêk Mountains, Thai soldiers robbed the refugees before forcing them at gunpoint down a vertical cliff, through and into active minefields the military were aware were present. Thai soldiers carried out mass shootings against groups and individuals who refused to descend or attempted to climb back to escape the minefields. Thousands of refugees who survived the initial descent remained trapped in minefields below the cliff into July, where more perished.

In January 1979, Vietnam overthrew Pol Pot's deadly regime in Cambodia, forcing the Khmer Rouge west where they were supported by Thailand at its border. Confronted with a country in ruins and also a famine, an estimated 140,000 Cambodian refugees fled to Thailand between the spring and early fall of 1979. Between approximately June 8th and June 15th of 1979, Thai soldiers used deception and violent coercion to corral Cambodian refugees from multiple encampments onto the buses bound for Preah Vihear, to be marched through minefields back into Cambodia. Some refugees were rescued before the buses drove off, and the Thais refused to halt the process.

Thai officials defended the operation as a national security move in response to a lack of resettlement assistance from Western nations, and insisted the Preah Vihear area offered the best chance for survival despite acknowledging there were boobytraps and landmines. US embassy staff and United Nations High Commissioner for Refugees workers later acknowledged their failure to act or attempt any meaningful protest. UNHCR official Dennis McNamara called the failure a "low" point in the agency's history. Some survivors went on to share their experiences in books, and the first film to document the atrocity, called Ghost Mountain: The Second Killing Fields of Cambodia, was released in 2019.

Production on a second film began in January of 2026. Directed by Leak Lyda, Blood Border: Cambodia's 2nd Killing Fields will be released in Cambodia in November of 2026.

== Background ==
=== Vietnam War spillover ===
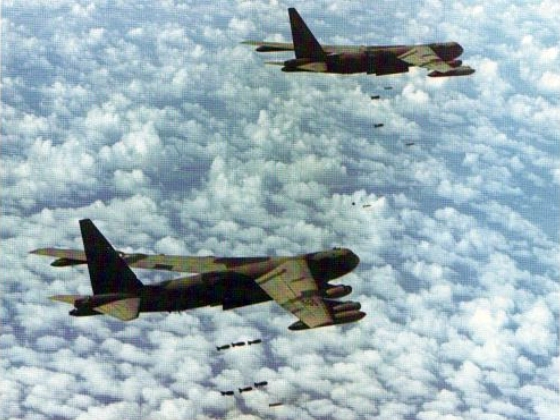
U.S. B-52D bombers over Cambodia, 1970.

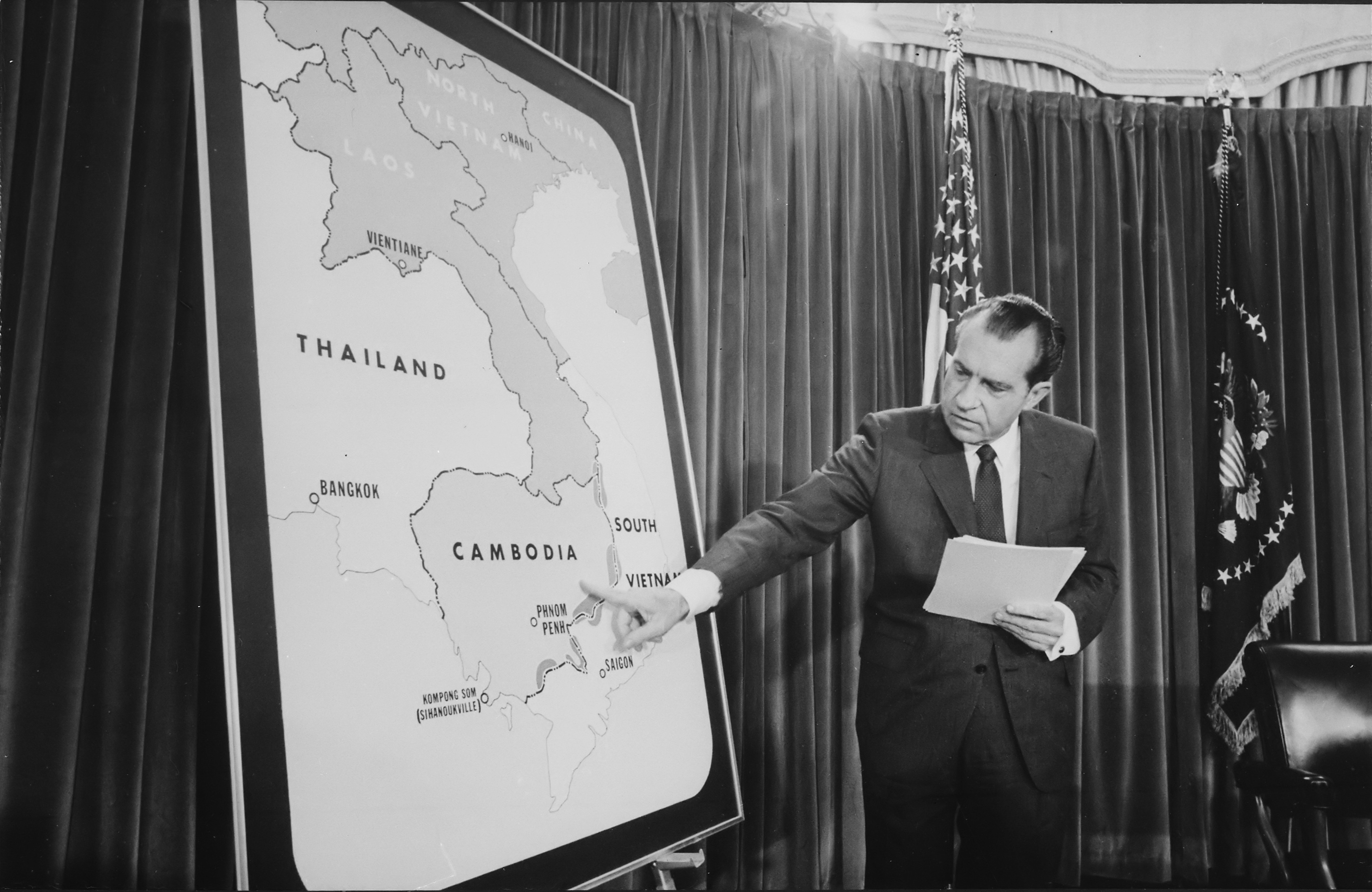
Nixon announces the Cambodian invasion to Americans, 1970.

During the Vietnam War, Thailand’s military government allowed access to Thai airbases from which the United States bombed Indochina, including locations within Cambodia. The USA pumped $1.1 billion+ in economic and military aid into Thailand, along with the construction of infrastructure connecting Thai cities to the countryside. At the war’s peak, about 50,000 US military personnel were stationed in Thailand.

From 1969 to 1973, the United States heavily bombed neutral Cambodia, an operation authorized by US president Richard Nixon and Secretary of State Henry Kissinger that was initially not disclosed. The bombing’s devastation, and then the subsequent April 1970 US ground invasion into eastern Cambodia, disrupted rural life and displaced over a million Cambodians.

The destruction and civilian casualties destabilized Cambodia, and was weaponized by the Khmer Rouge to radicalize rural Cambodians. The once-small guerrilla faction grew into a large army that seized control of the country on April 17th, 1975.

=== Vietnam invades Democratic Kampuchea ===
On 25 December 1978, supported by exiled Cambodian dissidents, Vietnam invaded Kampuchea (Cambodia) and captured capital Phnom Penh within weeks. Ousted and driven into the northwest area bordering Thailand were the Khmer Rouge, whose regime caused the deaths of up to 2.8 million Cambodians from exhaustion, starvation, disease, lack of medical care, or execution. Thailand viewed Vietnam's victory as a political threat and strengthened ties with the Khmer Rouge and China, a Khmer Rouge ally opposed to Vietnam. Thailand allowed a weapons flow from China to the Khmer Rouge, who funded themselves by smuggling gems and timber across the Thai border. China in turn ceased support for Thai communists and awarded the Thai military with cheap arms. The ousted Khmer Rouge were permitted entry into Thailand to escape and recover from attacks by the Vietnamese, before returning to Cambodia. The entry of civilian refugees was blocked as much as possible.

Most Cambodian survivors of the Khmer Rouge had lost family and most personal property, their homes, and had no means of survival. Some feared further persecution from the Vietnamese whom they perceived as a historical enemy. Now also facing famine, hundreds of thousands of Cambodians fled as 1979 advanced, seeking refuge at the Thai border. Thailand laid land mines to stop the anticipated influx of Cambodian refugees, then closed its borders, prompting refugees to gather in camps dotting the Cambodian side. Thailand's approach to Cambodian refugees was harder than to Hmong, Lao, Vietnamese, and Sino-Vietnamese due to a perception that "millions" could arrive.

=== Denial of refugee status ===
The UNHCR and scholar-practitioner Dr. Fiona Terry reported that between April 21st and 26th of 1979, 6,000 Cambodian refugees were pushed back to Cambodia from Ta Phraya district in Thailand by authorities. Dr. W. Court Robinson wrote that an additional 1,700 Cambodian refugees were pushed back in April from Aranyaprathet's Wat Koh area.

On May 5th, former New York Times foreign correspondent Henry Kamm reported that 200 "wan and apathetic" starving Cambodian refugees, mostly women and children, would be pushed back to Cambodia to "nearly certain death within seven days." In Ban Laem, a poor village about 50 miles northeast of Chanthaburi, Thai military authorities decided the refugees were healthy enough to be expelled back to Cambodia, despite acknowledging they may be killed by the Khmer Rouge. Officially no Cambodian refugees were to be forced back involuntarily, in practice Thai military officials said all Cambodian refugees would be denied refuge and pushed back to Cambodia. Thai military sources referred to foreigners opposed to this as "bleeding hearts." Thailand refused to recognize the fleeing Cambodians as refugees despite the UNHCR's offer to fund food for Cambodian refugees permitted entry. The Thai official said the refugees' fate was not a concern, adding, "I don't care. But if the American Embassy wants to come here and take them to America, they can."

Between the 18th and 23rd of May, some 1,000-3,000 more Cambodian refugees were pushed back to Cambodia from Nong Chan, north of Aranyaprathet. During a three-week pause on push backs, a minimum of 15,000 Cambodian refugees entered Thailand. This pause from late April to mid-May may have been performative as Secretary-General of the United Nations Kurt Waldheim was scheduled to visit in May. Once Waldheim arrived, the International Committee of the Red Cross (ICRC) and UNHCR convinced him to visit the refugees camped at Wat Koh. In response to pleas from the loved ones of refugees pushed back in April, Waldheim tried convincing Thai prime minister Kriangsak Chamanan to allow the refugees to remain.

=== Rumors and New York Times report ===
On June 5, Frenchwoman Yvette Pierpaoli traveled to the border from her Bangkok home upon rumors Thai officials planned to forcibly repatriate a large number of Cambodian refugees. Seeing Cambodians detained behind barbed-wire, she returned to Bangkok to organize an emergency response. British journalist and former foreign correspondent William Shawcross wrote that 110 buses arrived early Friday June 8th to a Cambodian refugee border encampment at Nong Chan. Thai soldiers told refugees they'd be moved to another camp; some refugees didn't believe this. Emptying the camp took three days and then Thai officials continued to other sites.

On June 12th, Henry Kamm reported that over the previous days, Thai officials bused tens of thousands of Cambodian refugees to the Preah Vihear area of the Dangrek Mountains to be forced at gunpoint down a cliff back into Cambodia. A Thai military officer said that more present and arriving Cambodian refugees would be forced back the same way. The officer said this area was the best chance for survival, then acknowledged the presence of "mines and booby traps" that cause casualties.

=== Protest and rescue attempts ===
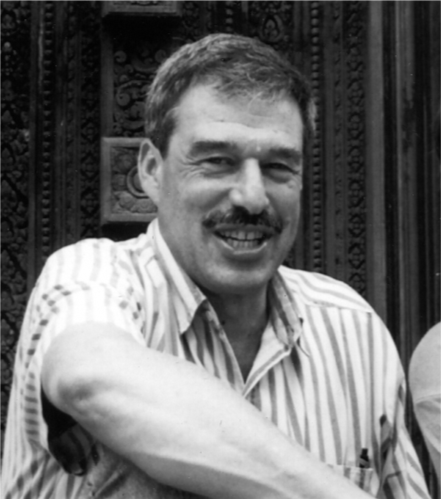
Lionel Rosenblatt (1943 – 2026), Angkor Wat, Cambodia, 1998.

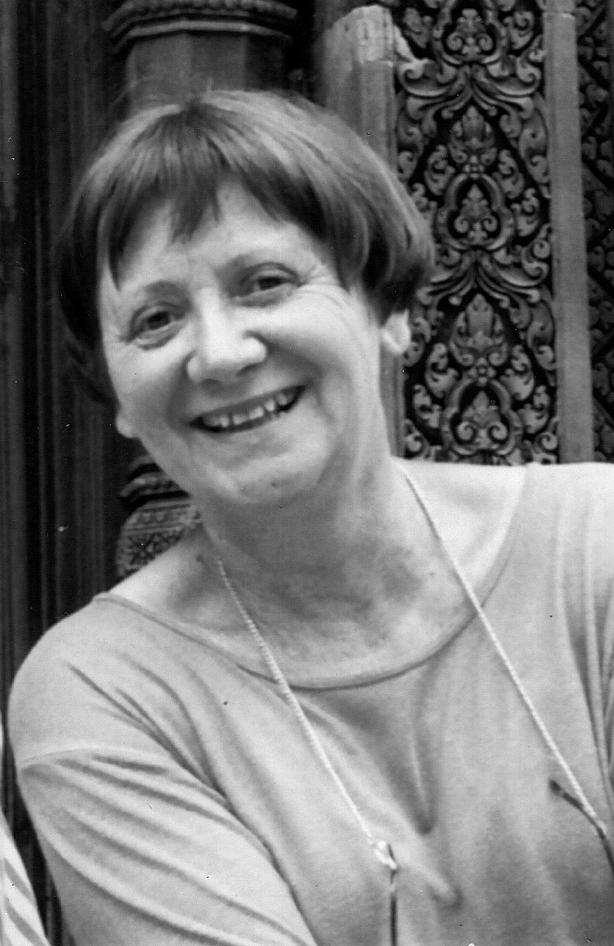
Yvette Pierpaoli (1938 – 1999), Angkor Wat, Cambodia, 1998.

The Thais arrived with Preah Vihear-bound buses to corral the Cambodian refugees at Aranyaprathet's Wat Koh area. Relatives of many refugees contacted their embassies after hearing that family members, whom they had just learned had survived the Khmer Rouge, would now be forced back into Cambodia. French journalist Roland‐Pierre Paringaux reported that a Khmer New Zealander trailed a convoy carrying a dozen of his family members with documentation securing their safety. He pleaded with the Thai officers at each stop before his family was driven off to Preah Vihear.

On June 12th, barb-wire blocked Pierpaoli, American diplomat Lionel Rosenblatt, John Crowley, and Rich Kocher from the Buddhist temple Wat Koh's enclosure, where "panic-stricken" Cambodian refugees were held, when they arrived with buses in a rescue-attempt. For three hours, from outside the camp, they read names aloud from a list of refugees approved for resettlement. There were translation problems reading the names and some named refugees were skeptical, while others trusted the foreigners over the Thai soldiers. The foreigners also "picked out" refugees. Noticing the one soldier near her, Pierpaoli "simulated a dead faint" into his arms, the distraction allowing a woman and child to board the foreigners' bus and three male refugees to run off. 1,500 listed refugees were saved; most refugees listed were taken to Preah Vihear. The Thais expelled the foreigners, and informed refugees they'd be transported to resettlement camps. Thai soldiers used physical violence to force a number of refugees onto the buses.

Pierpaoli, Rosenblatt, and others brought the rescued Cambodian refugees to Bangkok's Lumpini Transit Center. The Thais initially objected so USAID worker MacAlan "Mac" Thompson got the officials drunk and they relented. Thompson also attempted to trail the buses and was stopped by a Thai Army roadblock, though he correctly reported to Rosenblatt that the caravan was headed towards Preah Vihear.

International Committee of the Red Cross (ICRC) delegation head Francis Amar protested a day after the first group was taken to Preah Vihear, saying the refugees may die or end up in the same situation that first led them to flee. As a consequence, Amar was forced to return to Geneva, and replaced.

== Massacre at Preah Vihear ==
=== Forced descent at gunpoint ===
After 14 hours, the buses arrived to the Preah Vihear area in the dark. The Thai forces secured the spot from any possible outside observation. Children and women were the majority of passengers. The Thais handed out small amounts of rice, and then told the refugees: "Thai money will not be valid in Kampuchea. We ask you make a voluntary contribution to our military." Thai soldiers confiscated money and personal property they discovered on the refugees. At gunpoint, refugees were forced to descend a mined trail "down the nearly vertical mountainside," into the minefield that lay at the foot. Refugees were told they'd run into Vietnamese soldiers at the other end. The Thai military was aware there were mines in the path.

=== Mass shootings and landmine detonations ===
Shawcross reported that a group of refugees combined their valuables and held a white flag while returning towards Thai soldiers, who then took the items before they "opened fire on" the group. In what she calls the Preah Vihear Massacre, Dr. Khathaleeya Liamdee reported that those who refused to descend were shot. In To Bear Any Burden by Al Santoli, survivor Kassie Neou reported that Thai soldiers shot and killed a widowed mother who begged to stay. According to Neou, after soldiers ordered someone to take the woman's baby "out," he then discovered the deceased infant on a rock as he descended the cliff, and noted that a whole family had been killed.

Neou further reported hearing explosions regularly as he climbed down the cliff with his children. He "walked over" a separate pile of bodies belonging to an entire family, including parents, a grandmother, an uncle, and multiple infants, noting that another entire family had also been killed. Many attempting to return were shot and killed by Thai soldiers. In her oral history and memoir, survivor Teeda Butt Mam describes witnessing two boys attempting to fight their way back up the overhanging cliff. According to Mam, Thai soldiers shot one child between his eyes and shot the other child's head off, causing her young nephew to drop his bag of rice. Thompson reported that former Lon Nol soldiers were the first forced down. Once their bodies cleared a path through the minefield, refugees behind them "stepped over" the dead. According to Neou, most dead in the minefields belonged to the people forced down on June 8th; the refugees in his group walked in each other's footsteps.

Dr. W. Courtland Robinson wrote that approximately two-thirds of the refugees were ethnic Chinese.

=== Survivors stranded in minefields ===
Some 10,000 Cambodian refugees remained trapped in the minefields beneath Preah Vihear for over a week, into July. According to Teeda Butt Mam, the refugees "lay beside, stepped over, ate near, and slept with the mutilated dead" while trapped in the minefields. Refugees were fearful of setting off the mines if they resumed their journey. Water and food were scarce, and some refugees who ventured out in search of food and water were killed by landmines. Refugees hunkered against the mountains survived on rice sold at "usurious prices" by Thai soldiers. Some refugees received food sent by Vietnamese soldiers through de-mined trails. Some survivors were led to safety by Vietnamese soldiers. Traversing the minefields took three days, and when some survivors attempted to return to Thailand, they were shot by Thai soldiers. Some refugees died of disease and exposure.

Swedish ambassador Jean-Christophe Öberg was permitted by Thai authorities to bring supplies to the surviving Cambodian refugees via the Swedish Red Cross. Vietnamese authorities agreed at first before changing their minds, saying aid must go through Phnom Penh's government instead of across the border. This aid would never reach the refugees in time.

On June 30th, Pierpaoli was granted permission by Thailand to bring 21 tons of rice to stranded refugees. She and Rosenblatt were unsuccessful at getting the rice into the hands of the survivors. The pair received numerous notes, written by stranded Cambodian refugees, through Thai farmers and sympathetic Thai soldiers near the border. The Thai government responded by allowing the rice to be distributed, then agreed in July under world and UN pressure to readmit 1,000 of the surviving Cambodian refugees named on a list provided by Pierpaoli and Rosenblatt "who can still be saved," with help from UNHCR and the U.S. Embassy. This was permitted on the condition that the refugees be resettled elsewhere. The refugees were forced to return over the minefields and ascend the cliff to safety.

=== Fatalities ===
Shawcross wrote that 43,000-45,000 Cambodian refugees were forced down the cliff, and Dr. Courtland Robinson wrote the number was more than 42,000 by June 15th. Robinson wrote that the first people forced down the cliff, and the last to escape the minefields below Preah Vihear, suffered the worst casualties.

The 1991 report Land Mines in Cambodia: The Coward's War by Human Rights Watch & Physicians for Human Rights said "thousands" died at Preah Vihear, the majority from dehydration, mines, and diarrhea.

In her 1992 book Disposable People?: The Plight of Refugees, academic and former Chairwoman of the Women's Refugee Commission Judy A Mayotte said an official death count did not exist and that 10,000 refugees dead from shootings and mines alone "is considered a conservative estimate."

A 2017 UNHCR report said a minimum of 3,000 Cambodians died from "being shot by the soldiers, falling down cliffs, or stepping on landmines," while, according to Larry Thompson in 2010, it's unknown by the UNHCR how many of the refugees who survived the initial descent and became trapped, made it out alive.

Dr. Khathaleeya Liamdee, whose focus includes Thai-Cambodian border relations, wrote in 2024 that "over 10,000" of 43,000 died from landmines, injuries, starvation, and malaria in the "Preah Vihear Massacre."

== Aftermath ==
=== Geneva Conference ===
After the massacre at Preah Vihear, a meeting among representatives of 65 countries was held July 23rd at UNHRC's Geneva headquarters to address the issue of Indochinese refugees. US Vice President Walter Mondale likened the refugees to victims of 1930's fascist Germany and urged nations to take in the refugees. Thai Foreign Minister Uppadis Pachariyangkun stated that the mass influx of "land" refugees into Thailand was due exclusively to the Cambodian conflict and that withdrawal of Vietnamese troops was the only solution. However, the Vietnamese "boat people" were the main focus; the Cambodian refugees were barely mentioned.

=== Thailand establishes border camps and collaborates with Khmer Rouge ===
In a visit to the border in October, the "misery" had Prime Minister Kriangsak visibly distressed. This, and world outcry over Thailand's treatment of Cambodian refugees, resulted in Sa Kaeo Refugee Camp's creation "almost overnight;" conditions were poor and unsanitary. Rosalynn Carter visited Ban Kaeng camp in November. In November 1979, the largest camp, Khao-I-Dang, was opened. More Khmer refugees came fleeing the K5 Plan run by the Vietnamese occupation army.

Thailand was officially "neutral" regarding the Vietnamese rulers of Cambodia and the Khmer Rouge and other resistance groups. In practice, Thailand used the latter and the numerous Cambodian refugees as a buffer against the Vietnamese. Thailand transferred weapons and funded guerrilla groups, and was adamant that the resistance, particularly the Khmer Rouge, must approve and dictate on their terms any international aid to Cambodian refugees.

=== Border closure and "evacuees" policy ===
The Thai border was closed again in January 1980 as Thai officials worried the abrupt influx of refugees was leading to a demographic shift as well as a geopolitical conflict with Vietnam. The Thai government created a new word, evacuees, in order to signify that the refugees would only be welcomed temporarily and that they had to be relocated elsewhere as soon as possible. Thai officials developed a policy of "humane deterrence" in order to reduce of the number of Indochinese refugees in those camps. Those arriving by land were no longer referred to as refugees but as illegal immigrants. The camps were provided only with the bare necessities and interviews with international representatives for possible third-country resettlement were banned for new refugees.

=== Retrospect assessment ===
In the aftermath, several mid-level UNHCR Bangkok workers sent letters of protest to Geneva as the massacre proved that the agency's policy of making sure to not offend Thai authorities didn't work. Shawcross wrote that the silence over the April push backs had emboldened Thai authorities.

The US government, according to Shawcross, was the sole authority capable of stopping the move. British UNHCR representative Leslie Goodyear attempted to convince the US embassy to act. US embassy staff later admitted their reaction was "too weak." US ambassador Morton Abramowitz explained the "weak" response as a fear of "undermining" Kriangsak," saying:

We asked the Thais to stop. They refused. We took the view that if the government had been forced to stop in midstream, Kriangsak could have been brought down by the military. Also we hoped that the refugees would be able to get back. We didn't realize how awful the geography was.

UNHCR advisor Dennis McNamara later called UNHCR's failure to "formally or publicly protest must be seen as one of the low points of its protection history."

Shawcross wrote that, at the same time of the events at Preah Vihear, the Khmer Rouge were permitted by Thailand to "remain in well-hidden enclaves" on Thailand's southern border area.

== Causes ==
=== Thailand's "refugee burden" ===
Thai General Kriangsak Chomanan, 1976.

Henry Kamm reported that a Thai military official explained the decision as a result of the West's perceived failure to accept Cambodian refugees swiftly enough for what Thailand viewed as a security-risk. Thai authorities stated that the location in the Dangrek mountains near Preah Vihear offered the best chance for survival, despite landmines and other hazards.

In response to ICRC delegation head Francis Amar's protest, an infuriated Kriangsak justified the decision as Thailand's "business" and carried out "to protect national interest."

During a June 14th lunch with Jean-Christophe Öberg, Kriangsak was "pleased" the world was acknowledging Thailand's refugee issue because of the massacre. Kriangsak later told diplomat Ilter Turkmen that Thai "public support" backed the decision and only a promise that all the Cambodian refugees would be resettled outside of Thailand would stop it.

Larry Thompson wrote that Thailand had been pushing back Cambodian refugees "daily" in a "simple process" compared to the "elaborate and dramatic" busing of numerous Cambodian refugees to Preah Vihear specifically. Noting the Thais allowed Pierpaoli's group to save some refugees, demonstrating secrecy was unimportant, he cites Dr. Court Robinson and those who agree that Thailand was telling the world that it wouldn't shoulder the Cambodian "refugee burden" alone:

"Help, or watch Cambodians pushed back to die," was the message.

=== Thailand's loss of Khmer Preah Vihear ruins ===
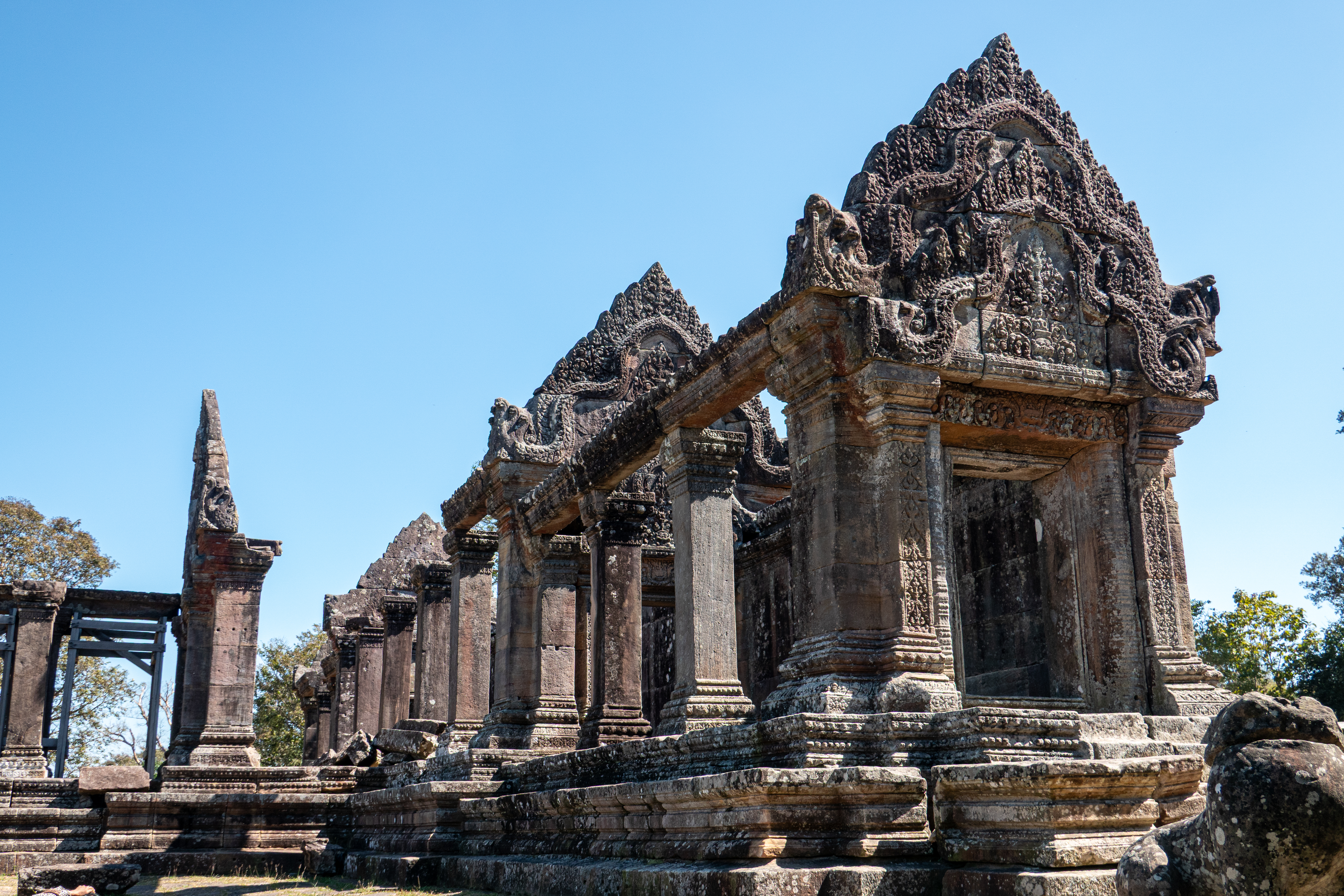
Preah Vihear temple.

The Franco-Siamese Treaty of 1904 mapped this Dangrek Mountain border along a watershed, and final demarcation was assigned to a Mixed Commission and not the watershed principle itself. The French and Siamese surveyed the area and Siam requested the French perform the topography. The Franco-Siamese Treaty of 1907 map placed Preah Vihear in Cambodia, prompting Siamese officials to request and distribute multiple copies. Documents from 1911 show Siamese officials knew the Annex I map put Preah Vihear in Cambodia, and Prince Damrong and Devawongse accepted the map as authoritative in shaping Siam's foreign policy. It was decades later, when Siamese irredentist Plaek Phibunsongkhram ascended in the late 1930s, that Siam objected.

Thailand's (Siam until 1938) strongman Phibunsongkhram, whose regime was heavily run along fascist lines, framed Thailand's "loss" of the ancient Khmer ruins as an example of "Western imperialism." Cambodian leaders framed Thailand's claims to Preah Vihear as part of a long pattern of Siamese imperialism in Southeast Asia. Prominent Thai figures fabricated an "extinct" ethnicity from the term "Khom," falsely claiming the Khom, not the Khmer, built Preah Vihear. Instead, the Khmer were falsely claimed as descendants of a "Thai family tree" to justify Thai nationalist claims over Preah Vihear and "perhaps even more" Cambodia.

The International Court of Justice ruled in 1962 that Thailand was bound by the map it long accepted, thus affirming Preah Vihear was located in Cambodia. In 2011, Dr. Peter Vail wrote that the choice of the Preah Vihear area for the 1979 atrocity may have been "a cruel revenge" for the ICJ's 1962 ruling. In 2026, historian Dr. In Sophal also expressed that the Preah Vihear massacre was "nationalist revenge" stemming from Thailand's loss of the Khmer temple in the 1962 ICJ ruling.

=== Perpetrators ===
The New York Time's Henry Kamm described his military source as "well-placed" and an "officer." Though pleased that Thailand was finally receiving attention, Kriangsak told Jean-Christophe Öberg that the decision came from the Supreme Command, now called the Royal Thai Armed Forces. In Land Mines in Cambodia: The Coward's War, Human Rights Watch & Physicians for Human Rights also identifies the Royal Thai Army as the perpetrators.

== Survivors and media ==
=== Memoirs and oral histories ===
Teeda Butt Mam, who was about 19 at the time, describes her experience starting on page 250 of her 1989 book To Destroy You Is No Loss. Kassie Neou shares his ordeal on page 268 in the 1986 oral history To Bear Any Burden by Al Santoli. Mengly Jandy Quach details his family's forced descent in his 2018 biography Dangrek Mountains: Unforgettable. Survivor Sari Touv's account is shared on page 46 in Dr. Court Robinson's Terms of Refuge: The Indochinese Exodus and the International Response. In 2023, survivor Bunseng Taing released his memoir called Under the Naga Tail.

=== Film ===
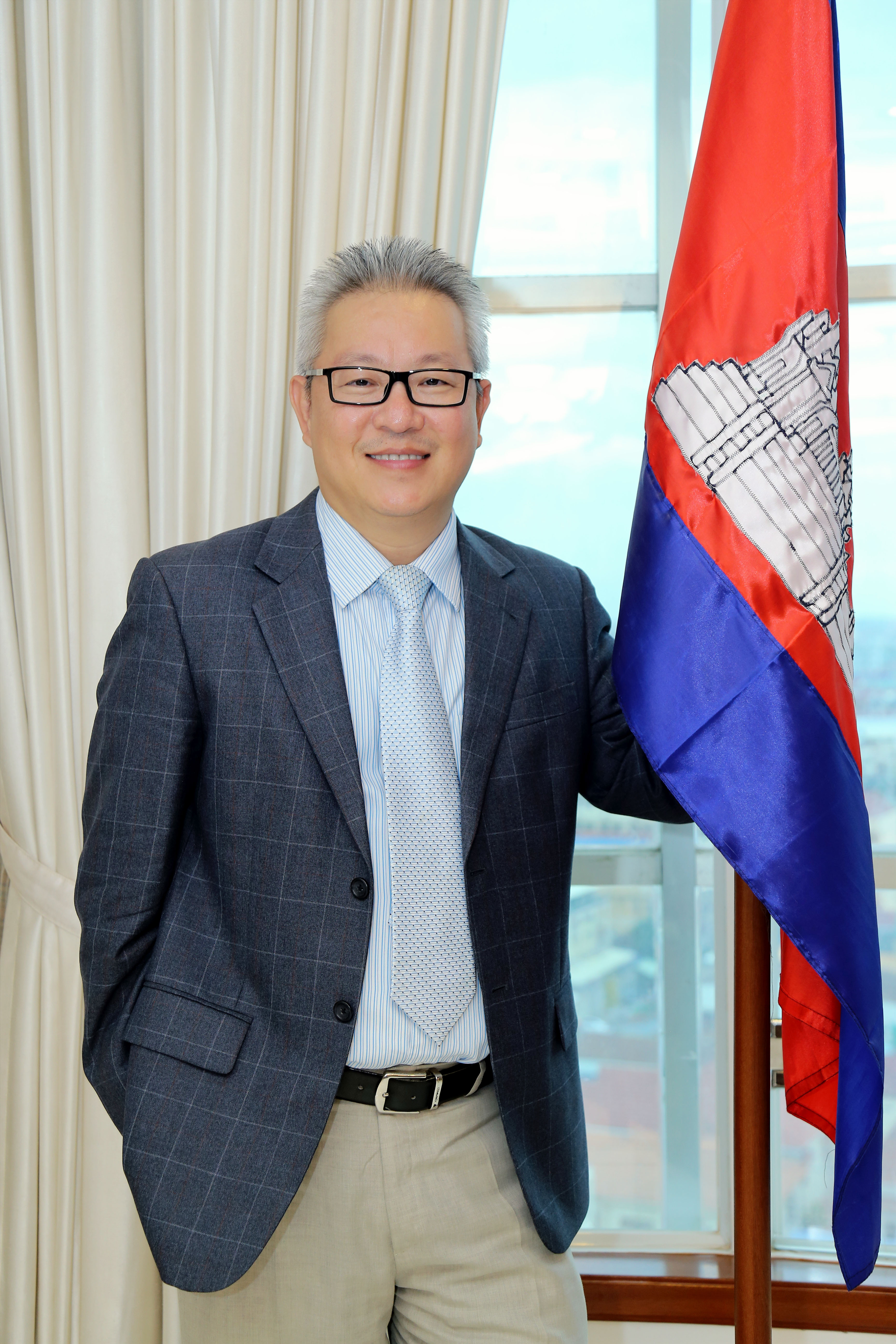
Survivor Dr. Mengly J. Quach, 2015.

The first film to document the massacre at Preah Vihear, called Ghost Mountain: The Second Killing Fields of Cambodia, follows Cambodian refugee Bunseng Taing, a survivor now living in Connecticut (USA), as he returns to the Dangrek Mountains in Cambodia to tell his story. The documentary debuted at the Sedona Film Festival in 2019.

In January of 2026, LD Productions began shooting Blood Border: Cambodia's 2nd Killing Fields, a feature film chronicling the massacre at Preah Vihear based on survivor Dr Quach Mengly's experience recounted in his book. Production also drew from the accounts of other survivors. Historian Vong Sotheara expressed that there's consistency across the testimony of survivors, saying, "When people from different places tell the same story, it is not fabrication. And there are many written records and consistent accounts describing these sufferings."

== Legacy ==
=== Anti-Siamese sentiment among the Khmer ===
Because tens of thousands of Khmers had been forced by famine to find refuge in Thailand, the violent response by the Thai authorities left a mark on the modern conscience. More specifically, the inhumane treatment of Khmer refugees has fuelled anti-Siamese sentiment in Cambodia. The anti-Thai riots of 2003 in Cambodia were filled with the memory of the violence inflicted on the refugees in Dangrek mountains. The Dangrek events fuelled not only anti-Siamese sentiment but also anti-Vietnamese as the Khmer Rouge used the atrocities in Dongrek as a platform for lobbying against the Vietnamese occupation.

=== Demining along the border ===
In the aftermath of war, it has taken decades to take out the landmines left behind by the Khmer Rouge, Thai and Vietnamese soldiers in the Dangrek mountain range, and more generally across Cambodia.

== Bibliography ==
- Van, Ly; Ly, Van Aggadipo (2010). O! Maha Mount Dangrek: Poetry of Cambodian Refugee Experiences. Cambodian Expressions. ISBN 978-1-4507-0519-6.
