= Wishing Lollipop =

Khmer film

- Khmer: អំណោយស្នេហ៍ ថ្ងៃណាត់ជួប
- Directed by: Un Bunthoeurn
- Written by: Noun Molin
- Produced by: Long Sovantha
- Starring: Vy Yaro; Chen Chen; Sveng Socheata; Tep Rindaro; Kit Monorom
- Cinematography: Jean Chhor
- Edited by: Seng Bunsor; Un Bunthouern
- Production companies: LD Entertainment KH; LD Picture Production
- Distributed by: Westec Media Limited
- Release dates: 19 January 2023 (Cambodia); 31 May 2023 (CIFF)
- Running time: 125 min.
- Country: Cambodia
- Languages: Khmer; Sign language

Wishing Lollipop (Khmer: អំណោយស្នេហ៍ ថ្ងៃណាត់ជួប, Amnaoy Snae Thngai Nat Chuop) is a 2023 Cambodian drama film directed by Un Bunthouern and written by Noun Molin. Wishing Lollipop has been screened in Cambodian cinemas and on the Angkor DC App. Wishing Lollipop was included as part of "Stories in Cambodia" at the 12th Cambodia International Film Festival.

== Premise ==
The plot revolves around Kay and Norea. The mother of the first is deaf and lying in a hospital bed and he faces issue paying her medical bills. Kay has an accident and drowns but he soon can come back among the living by switching bodies with Norea but going back in time 30 days before his death.

== Cast ==
- Vy Yaro as Kay
- Chen Chen as Norea
- Sveng Socheata as Kay's mom
- Tep Rindaro as doctor

== Screenings ==
The film also was screened at the Cambodia International Film Festival in 2023 and The 5th Lancang-Mekong International Film Week in 2023 at Kunming city of the province of Yunnan, China.

== Awards and nominations ==
Year	Award	Category	Recipient	Result	Ref.
2023	5th Lancang-Mekong International Film Week	Un Bunthouern	Honor Award	Won	

== Reception ==
A review found that the film was "not your typical romantic comedy. The movie centers on the relationship between the character Norea, played by Chen Chen, and the character Kai, played by Vy Yaro. Their relationship brings a whole new level to the meaning of “self-love.”
