= Leak Lyda =

Cambodian film director

- លៀក លីដា
- Born: July 3, 1983 (age 43); Kampong Thom Province, Cambodia
- Occupation: Film director
- Years active: 2009–present
- Known for: The Clock: Spirits Awakening, Rent Boy (2023 film) and The Night Curse of Reatrei
- Spouse: Gech Prak
- Children: 4

Leak Lyda (Khmer: លៀក លីដា; born July 3, 1983) is a Cambodian film director, LD Entertainment KH's CEO and Angkor DC. Best known for his feature The Clock: Spirits Awakening, Rent Boy (2023 film) and The Night Curse of Reatrei.

== Background ==
Hailing from Kampong Thom province, Leak Lyda is a self-taught film producer and director that has been in the entertainment industry for more than a decade, producing films spanning the horror, romance and comedy genres.

== Career ==
The festival and marathon opening doors for Cambodian films were judged by Leak Lyda.

Leak Lyda, owner of LD Picture Productions, said ‘The Clock’ is his first movie being “exported” to other countries. He called it a very huge opportunity for a Cambodian movie to be screened internationally.

The Angkor DC app, the first app for paying to watch Cambodian movies, has been launched by Leak Lyda.

Leak Lyda founded the CFA (Cambodia Filmmaker Association). This association's main objective is to make the Cambodian film industry a viable industry.

CNSFF hosts seminar on how to sell Cambodian films to the international market. Leak Lyda, a distinguished guest leading the seminar, was an acclaimed film director.

“It is really important to help the youth enter the film industry, to help young talents becoming professionals” said Leak Lyda, a Cambodian filmmaker and jury member in Chaktomuk Short Film Festival.

The Night Curse of Reatrei was co-produced by Leak Lyda and a Burmese production company, making it the first production between Cambodia and Burma. It made a record of being the highest-grossing Cambodian horror film of 2024, the highest-grossing foreign film of 2024 in Myanmar, the highest-grossing Cambodian film of all time in Taiwan, and the second highest-grossing Cambodia film in Russia.

LD Entertainment CEO Leak Lyda discussed his historical drama Blood Border: Cambodia’s 2nd Killing Fields, based on Mengly J. Quach’s memoir about the 1979 Dangrek Mountains refugee tragedy. Told through a child's eyes, the ambitious film aims to bring international awareness to this lesser-known chapter while elevating Cambodian cinema to global standards.

== Filmography ==
Year	Title	Director	Writer	Notes
2012	Arb Wear Helmet	Yes	No	
2013	Arb Wear Helmet 2	Yes	No	
2014	Jar	Yes	No	
2015	Two Fathers	Yes	No	
2018	Ghost Ring	Yes	No	
2019	The Clock: Spirits Awakening	Yes	Yes	screenplay
2023	12E	Yes	No	
2023	Rent Boy (2023 film)	Yes	No	
2024	The Night Curse of Reatrei	Yes	No	
2024	Neath's Love Story: Post Angkor Youth	Yes	story	
2024	Neath's Love Story: Tomorrow Again	Yes	story	
2024	Neath's Love Story: Dead Mama	Yes	story	
2026	Blood Border: Cambodia's 2nd Killing Fields †	Yes	Yes	screenplay
2027	My Daughter, My Mom †	Yes	No	

== Awards and nominations ==
Year	Film	Award	Category	Result
2019	The Clock: Spirits Awakening	Cambodia National Film Festival	Best Film	Won
2019	The Clock: Spirits Awakening	Cambodia National Film Festival	Best Director	Won
2020	The Clock: Spirits Awakening	Horror Bowl Movie Awards	Best Direction	Won
2020	The Clock: Spirits Awakening	13 Horror Movie Awards	Best Film	Nominated
2022	The Clock: Spirits Awakening	Cambodia International Film Festival	Director Producer Award of the Year	Won
