= Private Love =

Cambodia comedy film

- ស្នេហា Private
- Directed by: Diep Sovanndara
- Written by: Diep Sovanndara
- Produced by: Leak Lyna
- Starring: Neay Kroeun; Keo Monyta; Nou Ousaphea
- Production companies: LD Entertainment KH; LD Picture Production
- Release date: 14 April 2022 (Cambodia)
- Running time: 90 min.
- Country: Cambodia
- Language: Khmer

Private Love (Khmer: ស្នេហា Private, Sneha Private; transl. Private Love) is a 2022 Cambodian romantic comedy film directed and written Diep Sovanndara.

== Plot ==
The relationship between Nadeth and Netra is at a stage where there are no incoming and outgoing calls, no greetings, and no dates.
