= LD Entertainment KH =

Cambodia film production company

- Type: Subsidiary
- Industry: Film production
- Predecessor: LD Picture Production
- Founded: 1 July 2010; 16 years ago
- Headquarters: Phnom Penh, Cambodia
- Area served: Worldwide
- Key people: Leak Lyda (Chairman and founder) Leak Lyna ( Executive producer and founder )
- Products: Motion pictures
- Parent: LD Picture Production
- Subsidiaries: LD (film studio); Angkor DC (streaming)
- Website: www.ldentertainmentkh.com

LD Entertainment Co., Ltd. (Khmer: អិលឌី អេនធើធេនមែនធ៍), doing business as LD, is a film studio subsidiary of the Cambodia entertainment. LD had released films of various genres such as romance, comedy, horror and drama as well as the hit films The Clock: Spirits Awakening, Rent Boy (2023 film), The Night Curse of Reatrei, Mannequin Wedding and The Old Man (2026 film).

== History ==
LD Entertainment was founded in 2010 under the name LD Pictures. It was legally incorporated on September 25, 2019.

== Filmography ==
As of 2021, the majority of the LD film catalogue is now available on streaming in Angkor DC App.

=== LD Films ===
Year	Movie Title	Director	Writer	Genre	Release date(s) (Cambodia)
2012	Arb wear helmet part 1	Leak Lyda	Diep Sovandara	Horror Comedy	12 March 2012
2013	Arb wear helmet part 2	Leak Lyda	Diep Sovandara	Horror and Comedy	10 April 2013
2013	Somnerch Nak Psong Preang Tang 4	Diep Sovanndara	Diep Sovandara	Comedy	12 December 2013
2014	Silly Son in Law	Diep Sovanndara	Diep Sovanndara	Comedy and Horror	7 February 2014
2014	Jar	Diep Sovanndara	Diep Sovanndara	Horror and Comedy	3 April 2014
2014	Two Fathers	Pek Mi	Pek Mi	Comedy and Drama	21 November 2014
2015	Bangkol Krak	Diep Sovanndara	Diep Sovanndara	Horror and Comedy	6 January 2015
2015	God fall from the sky	Diep Sovanndara	Diep Sovanndara	Comedy and Drama	26 February 2015
2015	Nak Leng Cherng Kvea	Diep Sovanndara	Diep Sovanndara	Comedy	15 March 2015
2015	Two Brothers	Pek Mi	Pek Mi	Comedy and Drama	30 July 2015
2016	Kompol Neak Somtean Job Sne	Long Sovantha	Long Sovantha	Comedy and Drama	31 March 2016
2016	Neay Kvak Neay Kven Chhlong Phob	Diep Sovanndara	Diep Sovanndara	Comedy	12 May 2016
2016	Hello Phnom Penh	Preeda Watana	Preeda Watana	Comedy	1 June 2016
2016	Trokol Nak Brodal	Pek Mi	Pek Mi	Comedy	13 October 2016
2016	The Mummy	Pek Mi	Pek Mi	Horror and Comedy	29 December 2016
2017	Job Soy 1	Kreoun	Kreoun	Comedy and Drama	13 April 2017
2017	Thort Kun	Kreoun	Kreoun	Comedy	19 October 2017
2017	Silly Man	Diep Sovanndara	Diep Sovanndara	Comedy	28 December 2017
2018	Jar 2	Diep Sovanndara	Diep Sovanndara	Horror and Comedy	18 March 2018
2018	Somnerch Snea Niseth Pet	Va Sokheng	Va Sokheng	Romance and Comedy	12 April 2018
2018	The Ghost Ring	Leak Lyda	Pek Mi	Horror and Comedy	31 May 2018
2018	The Unborn Baby	Pek Mi	Pek Mi	Thriller and Comedy	7 November 2018
2018	Proleng Mnus Ros	Diep Sovanndara	Diep Sovanndara	Horror and Comedy	25 December 2018
2019	Hammock	Un Bunthoeurn	Heng Narong	Horror and Drama	5 February 2019
2019	My Hubby	Pek Mi	Pek Mi	Comedy and Drama	7 March 2019
2019	Where is ghost?	Ronan Channa	Ronan Channa	Horror and Comedy	21 March 2019
2019	Job Soy 2	Kreoun	Kreoun	Comedy and Drama	11 April 2019
2019	The Clock: Spirits Awakening	Leak Lyda	Nuon Molin; Leak Lyda	Horror and Drama	21 November 2019 (Cambodia); 26 December 2019 (Thailand and Laos); 6 August 2020 (Singapore); 13 August 2020 (Malaysia and Brunei); 2 November 2022 (Indonesia)
2019	My Wife is Tomboy	Diep Sovanndara	Diep Sovanndara	Romance and Comedy	19 December 2019
2020	The Last Tag	Seng Chanvisal	Nuon Molin	Horror and Drama	23 January 2020
2020	Somrach Kon Ta Sak 5	Pek Mi	Pek Mi	Horror and Comedy	13 February 2020
2020	The Last Smile	Diep Sovanndara	Diep Sovanndara	Romance and Drama	7 July 2020
2021	Passion	Kreoun	Kreoun	Comedy	18 November 2021
2022	Private Love	Diep Sovanndara	Diep Sovanndara	Romance and Comedy	14 April 2022
2022	Bangkol Krak 2	Diep Sovanndara	Diep Sovanndara	Horror and Comedy	12 May 2022
2022	Single Dad (film)	Diep Sovanndara	Diep Sovanndara	Comedy and Drama	21 July 2022
2022	Hello Neighbor	Un Bunthoeurn	Nuon Molin	Comedy and Drama (LGBT)	25 August 2022
2022	My Hubby 2	Pek Mi	Pek Mi	Comedy	22 September 2022
2022	Job Soy 3	Kreoun	Kreoun	Comedy	2 November 2022
2023	Wishing Lollipop	Un Bunthoeurn	Nuon Molin	Drama	19 January 2023
2023	Crush Pu	Diep Sovanndara	Nuon Molin	Romance and Comedy	2 March 2023
2023	Jar 3	Diep Sovanndara	Diep Sovanndara	Horror and Comedy	23 March 2023
2023	Give My Last Hello	Un Bunthoeurn	Nuon Molin	Romance Drama (LGBT)	13 April 2023
2023	Grade 12E	Leak Lyda; Diep Sovanndara	Nuon Molin	Horror and Mystery	4 May 2023
2023	Maly	Diep Sela	Nuon Molin	Horror and Mystery	22 June 2023 (Cambodia); 25 August 2026 (Prime Video in North and South American)
2023	Ghost Possession	Huy Yaleng	Huy Yaleng	Horror and Drama	27 July 2023
2023	Single Dad 2	Diep Sovanndara	Diep Sovanndara	Comedy and Drama	17 August 2023
2023	Photocopy	Un Bunthoeurn	Nuon Molin	Horror and Thriller	14 September 2023
2023	Rent Boy (2023 film)	Leak Lyda; Diep Sovanndara	Diep Sovanndara	Romance and Comedy	9 November 2023 (Cambodia); 25 January 2024 (Laos); 21 March 2024 (Thailand); 26 July 2024 (Myanmar)
2024	Mr.Goodman	Un Bunthoeurn	Nuon Molin; Say Veacha	Romance and Comedy	11 January 2024
2024	The Night Curse of Reatrei	Leak Lyda; Diep Sela	Nuon Molin; Vuth Oudom	Horror and Mystery	14 March 2024 (Cambodia); 3 May 2024 (Myanmar); 14 June 2024 (Taiwan); 26 June 2024 (Indonesia and East Timor); September 2024 (Russia and CIS)
2024	The Ritual Soul	Diep Sela	Nuon Molin; Vuth Oudom; Por Pisith	Horror and Comedy	9 May 2024
2024	Dear Mother Ghost	Diep Sela	Nuon Molin; Por Pisith	Horror and Comedy	13 June 2024
2024	Neath's Love Story: Post Angkor Youth	Leak Lyda; Diep Sovanndara	Leak Lyda; Diep Sovanndara	Romance and Comedy	1 August 2024
2024	Unwelcome Home	Diep Sela	Nuon Molin; Pao Makara	Horror and Drama	29 August 2024
2024	Neath's Love Story: Tomorrow Again	Leak Lyda; Diep Sovanndara	Leak Lyda; Diep Sovanndara	Romance and Comedy	19 September 2024
2024	Neath's Love Story: Dead Mama	Leak Lyda; Diep Sovanndara	Leak Lyda; Diep Sovanndara	Horror and Comedy	7 November 2024
2024	Pacha	Un Bunthoeurn	Nuon Molin; Por Pisith; Vuth Oudom	Horror and Comedy	28 November 2024
2024	Only Mom	Sok Leng	Nuon Molin; Say Veahca	Horror and Drama	25 December 2024
2025	Beheading (film)	Sok Leng	Nuon Molin; Say Veacha; Vuth Oudom; Por Pisith	Horror and Thriller	9 January 2025
2025	Grandpa 21	LD Picture	Nuon Molin; Por Pisith	Comedy and Family	23 January 2025
2025	14 February	Alex Dacev	Leak Lyda; Nuon Molin; Por Pisith	Horror and Drama	13 February 2025 (Cambodia); 20 October 2026 (Prime Video in North and South American)
2025	The Last Home	Diep Sela	Nuon Molin; Vuth Oudom; Say Veacha; Por Pisith	Horror and Mystery	6 March 2025
2025	Mannequin Wedding	Diep Sela	Nuon Molin; Vuth Oudom; Nou Yang Kuo	Horror and Drama	20 March 2025
2025	Book of Evil	Diep Sela	Nuon Molin; Vuth Oudom; Nou Yang Kuo	Horror and Mystery	8 May 2025
2025	The Neighbor	Bopha Neng	Nuon Molin; Por Pisith; Vuth Oudom	Thriller and Mystery	29 May 2025
2025	Junior Camper	Un Bunthoeurn	Say Veacha; Chhun Tonas	Horror and Comedy	10 July 2025
2025	The Ladies	Diep Sela	Por Pisith; Vin Pivorn	Comedy and Family	11 September 2025
2025	Hotel 2005	Diep Sela	Nuon Molin; Vuth Oudom; Nou Yang Kuo	Horror and Thriller	24 October 2025
2025	Angry Uncle vs Crazy Nephew	Diep Sovannadara	Diep Sovannadara	Comedy and Family	20 November 2025
2026	Alone in the Darkness	Un Bunthoeurn	Nuon Molin and Say Veacha	Horror and Thriller	17 February 2026
2026	The Old Man (2026 film)	Somchanrith Chap	Say Veacha	Drama and Family	12 March 2026
2026	The Ghost Who Stayed to Get Married	Diep Sela	Nuon Molin and Nou Yang Kou	Horror and Comedy	04 June 2026
2026	The Legend of Moranak Meada’s Mother	Sok Leng	Por Pisith	Drama and Family	02 July 2026
2026	Sleeping on Mother's Grave	Un Bunthoeurn	Nuon Molin and Nou Yangkou	Horror and Drama	03 December 2026

=== Top Grossing Films ===
Year	Movie Title	Director	Writer	Genre	Box Office
2019	The Clock: Spirits Awakening	Leak Lyda	Nuon Molin and Leak Lyda	Horror and Drama	
2022	Single Dad (film)	Diep Sovanndara	Diep Sovanndara	Comedy and Family	
2023	Rent Boy (2023 film)	Leak Lyda	Diep Sovanndara	Romance and Comedy	
2024	The Night Curse of Reatrei	Leak Lyda and Diep Sela	Nuon Molin	Horror and Mystery	$2 million
2024	Neath's Love Story: Post Angkor Youth	Leak Lyda	Diep Sovanndara	Romance and Comedy	
2025	Mannequin Wedding	Diep Sela	Vuth Oudom and Nou Yangkou	Horror and Drama	$1 million
2025	Junior Camper	Un Bunthoeurn	Say Veacha and Chhun Tonas	Horror and Comedy	
2025	Hotel 2005	Diep Sela	Vuth Oudom and Nou Yangkou	Horror and Thriller	$500,000
2026	Alone in the Darkness	Un Bunthoeurn	Nuon Molin; Say Veacha	Horror & Thriller	
2026	The Old Man (2026 film)	Somchanrith Chap	Say Veacha	Drama & Family	$850,000

=== J3 Studio Films ===
Year	Movie Title	Director	Writer	Genre	Release date(s) (Cambodia)
2025	Sugarcane Baby	Alex Dacev	Alex Dacev	Drama and Thriller	15 October 2025
2026	The Hatred Spirit	Sok Leng	Nuon Molin and Pao Makara	Horror and Drama	01 January 2026

=== Television series ===
Year	Title	Director	Writer	Original Network
2017	អាពាហ៍ពិពាហ៍ចម្លែក	Leak Lyda	Chhay Somaly	CTN
2017	ម៉ែដោះក្រមុំ	Chom Vichet	Va Arun	Bayon TV
2018	មន្តស្នេហ៍ក្រមុំបាយឆា	Leak Lyda and Ny Vantha	Chhay Somaly	CTN
2019	ក្រមុំបេះដូងដែក ប៉ះអង្គរក្សចិត្តខ្លាំង	Leak Lyda and Ny Vantha	Chhay Somaly	CTN
2019	ប្រពន្ធអ្នកឆ្លាត	Khat Dararith	Va Arun	PNN
2020	គូស្នេហ៍បម្រុង	Leak Lyda and Un Buntheurn	Ei Manith	CTN
2020	គ្រាប់បាល់អង្រួនបេះដូង	Leak Lyda and Ny Vantha	Chhay Somaly	CTN
2020	អ្នកម៉ាក់វ័យក្មេង វគ្គ១	Ny Vantha	Sam Sina	PNN
2021	គ្មានថ្ងៃបញ្ចប់	Leak Lyda and Ny Vantha	Chhay Somaly	CTN
2021	ថ្ងៃមុនស្អប់ ថ្ងៃនេះស្រឡាញ់	LD	Ei Manith	PNN
2021	ចំណងអាពាហ៍ពិពាហ៍	Ny Vantha and Un Buntheurn	Ei Manith	PNN
2022	អ្នកទី៣	Mongkol	Chhay Somaly	PNN
2022	អ្នកម៉ាក់វ័យក្មេង វគ្គ២	Ny Vantha	Sam Sina	PNN
2022	លោកប្តី៣៦៥ថ្ងៃ	Ny Vantha	Sam Sina	PNN
2023	លួចស្នេហ៍គូដណ្តឹង	Ny Vantha	Ei Manith	PNN
2023	ចុងភៅក្លែងកាយចៅហ្វាយក្លែងចិត្ត	Mongkol	Chhay Somaly	PNN
2024	រងើកភ្លើងអនឡាយ	Diep Sela	Chhay Somaly and Ei Manith	PNN
2024	ដឹកបេះដូងរកស្នេហ៍	Diep Sela	Pon Phoung Kanha	PNN
2025	ហេតុអ្វីជាពួកយើង	Un Buntheurn and Sok Leng	Ei Manith and Por Pisith	PNN
2025	គ្រួសារបង្គង	Diep Sela	Pon Phoung Kanha	PNN
