= Crush Pu =

Cambodia comedy film

Crush Pu (2023 film)
- Release poster
- លង់ស្នេហ៍ពូ
- Directed by: Diep Sovanndara
- Written by: Noun Molin
- Produced by: Leak Lyna
- Starring: Neay Kroeun; Saray Sakana; Chea Sovannorea
- Cinematography: Sok Leng; Sok Seiha
- Production companies: LD Entertainment KH; LD Picture Production; DreamTeam Pictures
- Release date: 2 March 2023 (Cambodia)
- Running time: 83 min.
- Country: Cambodia
- Language: Khmer

Crush Pu (Khmer: លង់ស្នេហ៍ពូ, Long Sne Pu; transl. Crush Him) is a 2023 Cambodian romantic comedy film directed Diep Sovanndara and written by Noun Molin.

== Plot ==
Niroth, after breaking up, decided to go on a mission and met Mr. Dao. They fell in love but did not dare to confess.

== Cast ==
- Neay Kroeun as Dao
- Saray Sakana as Niroth
- Chea Sovannorea
- Dj Kaka
- Ngoun Soben
- Lim Chealay
- Neay Krouch
- Mao Reachana
- Pou Khlaing
