= The Ritual: Black Nun =

Cambodia horror film

- កំណើតអរូប
- Directed by: Semsak Visal
- Written by: Semsak Visal
- Starring: Sveng Socheata; Kirsty-Marie Day; Brendan Gallagher; Dylan Neou Janowski
- Production company: Wonder Film Entertainment
- Release date: 6 April 2023 (Cambodia)
- Running time: 106 min.
- Country: Cambodia
- Language: Khmer
- Budget: $300,000

The Ritual: Black Nun (Khmer: កំណើតអរូប, Komnert Arob; transl. The Birth of a Demon) is a 2023 Cambodian horror film directed and written by Semsak Visal.

It made a record of being the highest-grossing Cambodian horror film of 2023.

== Plot ==
An expat in Cambodia accidentally causes a pregnant woman's death, leading her husband to curse him and his family. Years later, the curse afflicts his daughter-in-law who must undergo a ritual to give life to the unborn child.

== Release ==
=== Theatrical ===
The Ritual: Black Nun was released in Europe,Vietnam, Russia, Thailand, Laos and India.

=== Home media ===
The film was available on Prime Video, Apple TV+ and Tubi in the North America and United Kingdom.
