= Neath's Love Story: Post Angkor Youth =

Cambodia romance comedy film

Neath's Love Story: Chapter 1 Post Angkor Youth
- ប្រវត្តិស្នេហ៍នាងនាថ វគ្គ១ យុវវ័យក្រោយសម័យអង្គរ
- Directed by: Leak Lyda
- Written by: Leak Lyda; Diep Sovanndara
- Produced by: Leak Lyna
- Starring: Paing Takhon; Mélia Constantin; Tep Rindaro; Ngoun Soben; Chea Sovannorea
- Cinematography: Him Thideth
- Production companies: LD Entertainment KH; LD Picture Production
- Release date: 1 August 2024 (Cambodia)
- Running time: 106 min.
- Country: Cambodia
- Language: Khmer

Neath's Love Story (Khmer: ប្រវត្តិស្នេហ៍នាងនាថ, Pravoat Snae Neang Neat; transl. "Neath's Love History") is a 2024 Cambodian romance comedy film directed by Leak Lyda and written by Diep Sovanndara.

The first Cambodian film to be produced has three sequel completed at a cost of $1 million.

== Cast ==
- Paing Takhon
- Mélia Constantin
- Tep Rindaro
- Ngoun Soben
- Chea Sovannorea
- Dj. Kaka
- Sorn Piseth
- Saray Sakana
- Chem Chanra
- Sinon Loresca
- Choronai Pich
- Reth Tiger as Stunt Man
