= Mannequin Wedding =

Cambodia horror film

- Theatrical release Poster
- ភ្លើងឆេះក្លឹបក្រោមដី
- Directed by: Diep Sela
- Screenplay by: Vuth Oudom; Nou Yang Kuo
- Story by: Nuon Molin
- Based on: A Fire Accident at Underground Club in Siem Reap
- Produced by: Leak Lyna
- Starring: Chea Sorphea; De Laa Chhin; Kun Kaknika; Sovanlita Ngeth
- Production companies: LD Entertainment KH; LD Picture Production
- Release date: March 20, 2025 (Cambodia)
- Running time: 100 min.
- Country: Cambodia
- Language: Khmer
- Budget: $50,000
- Box office: $1 million

Mannequin Wedding (Khmer: ភ្លើងឆេះក្លឹបក្រោមដី, Phler Chhes Kleb Krom Dey; transl. A Fire Accident at Underground Club) is a 2025 Cambodian mockumentary supernatural horror film directed by Diep Sela and screenplay by Vuth Oudom and Nou Yang Kuo. Based on the true events.

The film was released theatrically on March 20 and received positive reviews from critics for its powerful performances. A sequel, Hotel 2005, was released in October 2025.

== Plot ==
Based on a true event in late 2021 at Siem Reap. After a fire consumes an underground club, a victim's family is haunted by a terrifying presence, unraveling the dark truth behind his death.

== Cast ==
- Chea Sophear as Pisey
- De Laa Chhin as Nun
- Sovanlita Ngeth as Sari
- Bun Kaven as Samnang
- Kun Kaknika as Minea
- No Farida as Lisa
- Sok Somaly as Tan
- Chhouen Bozz Piseth as Sokleng
- Phat Veasna as Chhean
- Vath Vaheang as Chhart

== Release ==
=== Theatrical ===
- The film's first release date is March 20, 2025.It made a record of being Cambodia's highest-grossing film on its opening day in 2025. It is one of the highest-grossing Cambodian film of all time in Cambodia.
- The film was re-released in Cambodia on September 20, 2025.

== Screenings ==
The film was officially selected as Cambodia’s entry for the prestigious Golden Rumdul Award at the 3rd Cambodia Asian Film Festival and was included in the July shortlist for the main competition.

Mannequin Wedding has been officially selected for the 15th Cambodia International Film Festival. The event will take place in Phnom Penh on March 24, 2026.

The film has secured a spot on the February shortlist for the main competition at the 2nd Asian Art Film Festival in Macau, having been officially selected as Cambodia’s entry for the prestigious Golden Petrel Award.

The film has been officially selected for the Panorama of Asian Cinema at the 4th Da Nang Asian Film Festival in Vietnam.

The film has been officially selected for Focusing on ASEAN Fantastic Films at the 13th Bakunawa Fest in the Philippines.

== Sequel ==
LD announced a sequel, and shortly afterward, another film production announced one as well. The sequel, Hotel 2005, is inspired by a true story that happened on the same land back in 2005, and it’s hitting theaters on October 24, 2025.

After its release, Hotel 2005 earned only half of its expected revenue compared to Mannequin Wedding, as Cambodia was at war with Thailand at the time. Many Cambodians refused to watch the film in the Thai-owned Major Cineplex theaters in Cambodia.

LD plans to produce its final film, The Red Devil, which tells the story of the famous, red-robed devil in Siem Reap.

== Awards and nominations ==
Year	Award	Category	Recipient	Result	Ref.
2025	Cambodia Asian Film Festival (Golden Rumdul Awards)	Best Leading Actress	Chea Sophear	Won	
2025	Cambodia Asian Film Festival (Golden Rumdul Awards)	Best Director	Diep Sela	Nominated	
2026	Asian Art Film Festival (The Golden Petrel Awards)	Best Supporting Actress	Chea Sophear	Nominated	
