= Women's Media Centre of Cambodia =

- អង្គការមណ្ឌលព័ត៌មានស្ត្រីកម្ពុជា
- Founded: January 1993
- Founders: H.E Chea Sundaneth; Ms. Som Khemra; Ms. Yim Chan Davy; Ms. Nuth Rasy; Ms. Tive Sarayeth Executive Director (2020-2023): Dr. Chanthol Oung Current Executive Director (2024-present): Mrs. Sawada Chan Krisna
- Type: Media Organization, Non-governmental organization, Nonprofit organization
- Purpose: Media Organization (Non-profit)
- Headquarters: Phnom Penh
- Location: Phnom Penh, Cambodia
- Region served: Nationwide
- Method: Donations and Grants, Self-Generated Income
- Executive Director: Sawada Chan Krisna
- Employees: 70+10 Volunteers (2012)
- Website: www.wmc.org.kh
- Formerly called: Cambodian Women's Committee for Non-Violence and the Election (CWCNVE) (1993–1995)

The Women's Media Centre of Cambodia (Khmer: មណ្ឌលព័ត៌មានស្ត្រីកម្ពុជា), commonly known as WMC is a Cambodian non-governmental, non profit media organization. WMC delivers national awareness and informative programs on a diverse range of issues affecting contemporary Cambodia, with a special focus on the roles and rights of Cambodian women. This organization is best known for its radio channel Women's Radio, FM103.5 (Khmer: វិទ្យុស្ត្រី អេហ្វអឹម ១០៣.៥).

Updated to today, WMC still runs through traditional media and broadcasting on social media such as Facebook:https://www.facebook.com/WMCwomenradio, website: https://wmc.org.kh/ and other platforms like Tiktok, YouTube and Telegram Channel as well.

== Background ==
During the UN-backed 1993 elections in Cambodia, a coalition of women formed the Cambodian Women's Committee for Non-Violence and the Election (CWCNVE). Their mission was to increase the participation of women in the democratic processes of voting and drafting the constitution. In collaboration with the United Nations Transitional Authority in Cambodia (UNTAC), and with CWCNVE launched advocacy and media campaigns and produced radio programs about voting. They collaborated with the NGO MediaTies to train a group of women in video production skills in order to document the election from a non-partisan perspective.

The momentum continued during the drafting of the Constitution of Cambodia. Through workshops, they gathered ideas from rural women and presented them to the Constituent Assembly. One outcome of those workshops was the production of a seven-minute video. It was called 'The Rights of Women To Be Guaranteed' and was broadcast nationally as the Constitution was being drafted.

Some of the coalition members recognized the need to continue to promote the rights of women even after the elections and UNTAC. They recognized the power of the media in promoting and protecting these rights as well as raising pressing development issues in the country. This core group of women went on to become the founders of the Women's Media Centre of Cambodia, and officially established it as a non-profit, non-governmental organization in January 1995.

Since 1995 ‘Women's Media Centre of Cambodia’ (WMC) continues acknowledging the power of media in promoting social change in Cambodian society. WMC is committed towards promoting gender equity, women's empowerment, and raising gender awareness in Cambodian society by discussing and bringing different issues that are often being not discussed openly and considered less important by various stakeholders. We have given voice and tried to unfold hidden and untold stories by discussing issues of developmental debates of decentralization and poverty together covering the issues like HIV and AIDS, trafficking, elections and domestic violence. WMC encourages promoting inclusive and optimistic media environment equally to all of its members and to the Cambodian community.

== Women's radio, FM103.5MHZ ==
Women's Radio FM 103.5 (Khmer: វិទ្យុស្ត្រី) produces educational radio programs designed for all sectors of Cambodian society, especially women in rural areas.

We potentially reach out to 75 percent of the population through a 10 kW antenna located in Phnom Penh, four relay stations in Kampong Thom province, Svay Rieng province, Battambang province, and Kampong Cham Province and via extensive partner radio networks throughout the country.

Radio Free Asia rated Women's Radio as the most popular radio station in Cambodia in 2010. The Cambodian Sentinel Survey carried out by BBC World Service Trust from 2007 to 2009 consistently rated Women's Radio as one of the top two leading radio stations in Cambodia. Unlike the other leading stations, Women's Radio is more popular with female audiences than men.

Women's Radio does not advertise spots promoting tobacco, alcohol, cosmetic and a few other items which may cause health concern to consumers.

== TV Unit ==
TV team is shooting for the drama "មេឃក្រហម-Red Sky"

WMC does not have its own TV Channel, but it has a TV unit which cooperates with local and international NGOs to produce television programs on social issues in Cambodia. This unit also produces weekly TV dramas, comedies and documentaries, which explore pressing social issues in the country. WMC does not own a TV station; thus, its programs are broadcast on SEA (South East Asia) TV, TVK (National Television—Television Kampuchea) and CTN (Cambodian Television Network) and through contact provinces, which enables the programs to be available to the general public.

The TV unit researches and examines “hot topics” in Cambodia and produces and broadcasts high-quality weekly TV programs as well as Edutainment Videos in response to these topics. Through popular television genres of drama, comedy, documentaries, and vox-pop, WMC positively impacts national audiences by covering the following topics;

- Violence against women and children: anti-domestic violence, anti-sexual trafficking, prevention of rape, drug and child labor;
- Human rights issues, including women’s rights, gender and the law relating to women and children;
- Family and community development;
- Health, birth control and spacing, maternal health;
- Education, advocating the importance of children’s education; and
- Women’s rights in community development;

In March 2006, the TV unit was selected by the Women's Film Festival Committee in Paris, to screen a WMC drama called "Live" which focused on human trafficking of Cambodian women. This was a huge achievement for WMC.

To broaden the TV unit's capacity to produce more educational programs on demand, WMC has two TV teams, the weekly TV team (WTV) and the edutainment video team (ETV), respectively. Both teams of TV unit are managed by women. Key members of these teams including manager, editor, script writers, camera operators are also women. Most of the men involved in the teams are to help in manual work.

== Mobile Broadcasting Units ==
Villagers are watching WMC programs through the MBU in Ouddor Mean Chey province in 2008

WMC launched its first Mobile Broadcasting Units (MBUs) in 2002 to educate and inform rural communities residing in “media black spots” across Cambodia where mainstream broadcast signal could not reach or the communities have no electricity and lack financial means to purchase televisions or radios.

On average, each MBU viewing attracts 300 villagers, of which 50 percent are women. Using LCD projector, DVD player, wide screen and speakers, MBUs broadcast the radio programs and TV programs at popular meeting places in the community. This usually takes place in the evening after working hours. MBU facilitators also effectively engage the audience by discussing about the key messages of the programs through question and answer activities. This reinforces the key messages and encourages the community to carry out the advocated “call to action”. Relevant learning materials, such as posters, brochures and fliers to reinforce messages are also provided.

== Listeners' and Viewers' Clubs ==
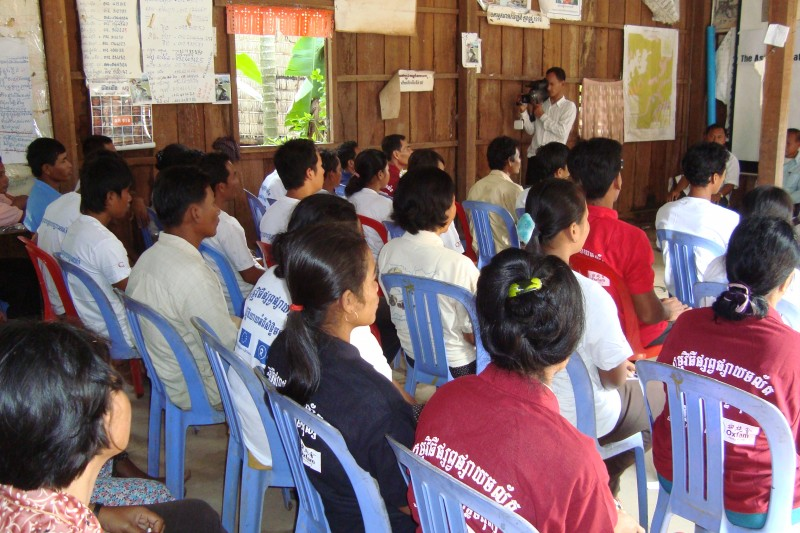
Launching Listeners' and Viewers' Clubs in Pursat province
