= Rent Boy (2023 film) =

Cambodian comedy film

- ប្រុសលក់ខ្លួន
- Directed by: Leak Lyda
- Written by: Diep Sovanndara
- Produced by: Leak Lyna
- Starring: Paing Takhon; Pich Votey Saravody; Khat Vaihang; Tep Rindaro; Kohtee Aramboy; Sudarat Butrprom
- Cinematography: Jean Chhor
- Production companies: LD Entertainment KH; LD Picture Production
- Distributed by: Skyline Media
- Release date: 4 November 2023 (Cambodia)
- Running time: 113 min.
- Countries: Cambodia; Myanmar
- Language: Khmer

Rent Boy (Khmer: ប្រុសលក់ខ្លួន, Bros Lak Khloun; transl. Rent Boy) is a 2023 Cambodian romance comedy film directed by Leak Lyda and written by Diep Sovanndara.

Starring Cambodian Pich Votey Saravody, Khat Vaihang,Tep Rindaro. Myanmar actor Paing Takhon. Thailand Sudarat Butrprom, Kohtee Aramboy and Vietnam Kieu Trinh.

== Plot ==
In Rent Boy, Paing plays Pai, a country boy raised by a stingy uncle, who comes to Phnom Penh to pursue higher education for a better future. To support his studies, Pai finds work at a bar, which soon leads him to a career as a gigolo.

== Cast ==
- Paing Takhon
- Pich Votey Saravody
- Tep Rindaro
- Khat Vaihang
- Sudarat Butrprom
- Kohtee Aramboy
- Kieu Trinh

== Release ==
- The film's first release date is November 9, 2023 It made a record of being Cambodia's highest-grossing Rom-Com film of all times.

== Screenings ==
The film was screened in Laos, Thailand and Myanmar.

The film was screened at first Macao International Comedy Festival (MICF) in Macao.

The film has an official selection at the 6th Lancang-Mekong International Film Week kicked off here in Phnom Penh, capital of Cambodia.
