= The Clock: Spirits Awakening =

Cambodia horror film

- Release poster
- នាឡិកាដាស់វិញ្ញាណ
- Directed by: Leak Lyda
- Written by: Noun Molin; Leak Lyda
- Produced by: Ear Sinan; Leak Lyna; Leak Lyda
- Starring: Sorn Piseth; Nov Dana; Yem Sreypich; Khul Samanta; Piseth Vandy; Nou Ousaphea
- Cinematography: Jean Chhor
- Edited by: Diep Sovanndara; Ny Vantha
- Production company: LD Picture Production
- Distributed by: LD Entertainment KH
- Release date: 21 November 2019 (Cambodia)
- Running time: 120 min.
- Country: Cambodia
- Languages: Khmer; French
- Budget: $350,000

The Clock: Spirits Awakening (Khmer: នាឡិកាដាស់វិញ្ញាណ, Nealeka Das Vinhnhean; transl. The Clock: Spirits Awakening) is a 2019 Cambodian horror drama film directed by Leak Lyda and written by Noun Molin.

At the 6th Cambodia National Film Festival, in 2019, the film received six nominations: "Best Film of the Year", "Best Director of the Year", "Best Editing Award", "Best Sound Engineering Award", "Best Actress" and "Best Actor". It won the first four of these awards.

== Plot ==
Cheata, a young girl, falls under the influence of the spirit of a deceased French lady who committed suicide decades before. This spiritual presence happens to be dwelling in the clock of the house.

== Cast ==
- Sorn Piseth as Virak
- Nov Dana as Chanda
- Yem Sreypich as Monika
- Khul Samanta as Cheata
- Lar Boomsma as Jean Batise
- Charlotte Van Hollekebe as Julie
- Nou Ousaphea as Sai
- Sem Sonita as Roth
- Keo Rotha as Synod
- Somol Minea as Lyly
- Piseth Vandy as Kanal
- Ban Sahrah Pich Monika as Nana
- Seoun Vita as Noun
- Vong Angila as Sin

== Production ==
According to Leak Lyda, production lasted one year for a budget of 400,000$.

== Awards and nominations ==
Year	Award	Category	Nominated work	Result
2019	Cambodia National Film Festival	Best Film	Leak Lyda	Won
2019	Cambodia National Film Festival	Best Director	Leak Lyda	Won
2019	Cambodia National Film Festival	Best Editor	Diep Sovanndara; Ny Vantha	Won
2019	Cambodia National Film Festival	Best Sound	Pea Nit	Won
2019	Cambodia National Film Festival	Best Actor	Sorn Piseth	Nominated
2019	Cambodia National Film Festival	Best Actress	Khul Samanta	Nominated
2019	Legend Cinema 2019	Best Actress	Yem Sreypich	Won
2020	Horror Bowl Movie Awards	Best Direction	Leak Lyda	Won
2020	Horror Bowl Movie Awards	Best Film of the Editor	Diep Sovanndara; Ny Vantha	Won
2020	Horror Bowl Movie Awards	Best Actor - Male	Sorn Piseth	Won
2020	13 Horror Movie Awards	Best Film	Leak Lyda	Nominated
2022	Cambodia International Film Festival	Director Producer Award of the Year	Leak Lyda	Won

== Screenings ==
The Clock: Spirits Awakening was screened in Brunei, Laos, Malaysia, Indonesia, Singapore.Thailand and China.

The film also was screened at the Luang Prabang Film Festival in 2022 and at the Cambodia International Film Festival (CIFF) in 2022.
