= CamboFest, Cambodia Film Festival =

CamboFest is an international film festival in Cambodia started in 2007 by Camerado. It is Cambodia's first internationally recognized film festival, and one of the first regular international movie events in Cambodia since the Khmer Rouge era.

The event, which is privately funded, showcases "international and local film and video makers in order to help revive a bona fide cinema industry and movie culture in Cambodia." The festival also serves to "promote awareness of IP (Intellectual Property) practices in the Cambodian media and motion picture sector by securing public performance permissions for every movie we screen from copyright holders."

CamboFest's Grabay Meas ('Golden Waterbuffalo') Award, held by Mr. Phun Sokunthearith, with Narin Hoo (back) and CamboFest founder Jason Rosette (right)

The CamboFest's award is the 'Grabay Meas' (Golden Waterbuffalo) trophy.

In its first two years, CamboFest was held in Phnom Penh and Siem Reap. A dedicated, 'YouTube'-style online video portal was also utilized for the 2007 and 2008 editions as an online venue, but this component was abandoned later due to bandwidth and user access (Digital Divide) limitations.

The third (2009) edition of CamboFest took place in the vintage Cambodian 'Royal' cinema hall, in Kampot, Cambodia, which was re-discovered by CamboFest staff who were scouting reputed vintage cinema houses in the area. Only a handful of older local Cambodians knew of the 'Royal', which had lain unused since 1989 after a brief post Khmer Rouge comeback.

Despite the efforts of foreign movie pirates who attempted to stymie the 2009 event with a series of phony press releases and fake classified ads in the Phnom Penh Post, the 2009 historically significant 'Royal' edition of CamboFest was held as planned, from December 4–6, 2009, reviving the once-defunct Cambodian cinema house with a custom screen and power plant installation.

Enduring a lack of institutional support following the 3rd edition's challenges at the hands of expatriate pranksters and movie pirates, individual contributors stepped in to fill the gap instead and CamboFest's fourth edition took place in Kampot, Cambodia on March 2–6, 2011. Dates were publicly listed as March 1–9 to render potential pranks and last minute Cambodian government 'variances' less problematic for the event. (*no notable interference was sustained at the 4th edition)

Notable undertakings at the festival's 4th edition included the training of a local Cambodian youth group, the Youth Association for Human Resource Development (YAHRD) , who set up and operated all equipment, changed screeners, greeted and informed guests, conducted outreach and publicity, and essentially ran the entire event. Their efforts culminated in the long-awaited official Cambodian premiere of Robert Flaherty's 'Nanook of the North' , with live Khmer narration provided by the youth group. The film screened in Cambodia 88 years after its initial release with the permission of the Robert Flaherty Film Seminar

In 2011, CamboFest commenced an international traveling festival edition, with its first stop in North America taking place in New York City courtesy of New Filmmakers. . This marks the first time a Cambodian film festival will travel internationally, with further host venues around the world sought and welcomed on an ongoing basis.
