= List of Cambodian films of the 2000s =

This is an incomplete, chronological list of films produced in the Khmer language in the 2000s.

The decade included blockbusters such as The Snake King's Child (2001), Tum Teav (2003), Neang Neath (2004), The Crocodile (2005), and The Snake King's Grandchild (2006). More than 400 Cambodian films were released in this period of time. Following the 2003 Phnom Penh riots, fueled by rumors that Thailand claimed Angkor Wat, Thai television series and movies were absent from Khmer channels until 2008. During that period nearly 60 Khmer movies were released each year.

== 2000 ==
Title	Director	Cast	Genre	Notes
2000
The Land of the Wandering Souls	Rithy Panh		Drama	
Puthisen Neang Kongrei		Hum Chora, Suos Sothera, Chan Leakenna	Legendary	

== 2001 ==
Title	Director	Cast	Genre	Notes
2001
Decho Domdem			Legendary	
The Snake King's Child	Fai Som Ang	Wanai Kraibutr, Pich Chan Boremei, Ampor Tevi, Tep Rundaro	Legendary	
Que la barque se brise, que la jonque s'entrouvre	Rithy Panh		Drama	

== 2002 ==
Title	Director	Cast	Genre	Notes
2002
Domnok Tuk Cheam Nov Kraom Tuk Pleang		Eng Rithy, Keo Pich Pisey, Chai Ly Dalene	Drama, Comedy	
Jruos Snae Pich Nil		Eng Rithy	Romance	
Mapuyungkeo		Suos Sotheara	Legendary	
Mea Yeung		Tep Rundaro, Chan Leakenna, Heng Dary, Pov Somnang	Legendary	The movie would be 20 minutes long if songs were excluded from the film.
Preah Ong Jey			Legendary	
The King's Sugary Melon		Meas Somavatei	Legendary	
Pka Dos Leu Tmor			Drama	
Raja Bori	Norodom Ranariddh	Ouk Phalla, Chea Samnang	Historical	
Sappsitt			Legendary	
Sovann Ten On		Tep Rundaro, Chan Leakenna	Legendary	The movie would be 15 minutes long if songs were excluded from the film.
Yeay Eun Komris Ta Sis Komnanh		Yeay Eun, Song Sis	Comedy	

== 2003 ==
Title	Director	Cast	Genre	Notes
2003
Gratefulness	Heng Tola		Drama	
Jao Srotop Jek		Danh Monika	Legendary	
Momee Prolaeng Pleung			Drama	
Miyea Satrey		Tep Rundaro, Suos Sotheara	Drama	
Niyeat Puos			Horror	
Good Husband	Parn Puong Bopha	Sim Solika, Keo Pich Pisey, Khieu Sompeth, Neun Chanteun	Comedy	
S-21: The Khmer Rouge Killing Machine	Rithy Panh		Documentary	Screened at the 2003 Cannes Film Festival
Tiyen Ahp			Horror	
Tngai Osdangkut		Eng Rithy, Chai Ly Dalene, Ouk Somarima	Legendary, Drama	
The People of Angkor	Rithy Panh		Drama	
Tuk Jet Mdai	Parn Puong Bopha	Tep Rundaro, Dy Saveth	Drama	
Tum and Teav:Romeo and Juliet	Fai Som Ang	Sok Sophea, Danh Monika	Legendary, Romance	

== 2004 ==
Title	Director	Cast	Genre	Notes
2004
3 Ace	Parn Puong Bopha	Eng Rithy, Tep Rundaro, Hum Chora, Dy Saveth, Sim Solika, Keo Pich Pisey, Danh Monika, Veth Rattana, Veng Sreynou, Ek Puthong, Nop Bayarith	Drama	
Ah Lev		Sovann Makura, Suos Sotheara, Danh Monika	Legendary	
The Blood of an Orphan		Suos Sokunthea, Toung Tharith	Drama	
Keo Long Keo Lai		Keo Pisey	Legendary	
Kong Kam Kong Keo		Eng Rithy, Keo Pich Pisey	Romance	
Mae Ombao Meas		Suos Sotheara	Romance	
Mea Yeung	Nop Sombath	Tep Rundaro, Prum Ratha	Drama	
Min Yoke Te Pdei Jass Saóp Nass Pdei Kmeng	Parn Puong Bopha	Tep Rundaro, Yu Disco, Suos Sotheara, Sim Solika	Romance	
Mohetjata	Meng Sarun	Tep Rundaro	Legendary, Horror	
Moranak Meada	Fai Som Ang		Legendary	
Neang Neath			Horror	
Nieng Arp			Horror	
Ossja Nass Loke Pdei		Tep Rindaro, Neun Chanteun	Comedy	
Oun Cheu Jet Nass			Drama	
Popoke Kmao		Eng Rithy, Keo Pich Pisey	Drama	
Picheyvongsa		Heng Bunleap, Danh Monika	Legendary	
Preah Sothun Neang Keo Manorea		Sok Sophea	Legendary	
Preah Toung Neang Neak		Yuthara Chany, Keo Pisey, Meas Somavatey	Legendary	
Preay Krola Pleung			Horror	
Pume Drachan			Action	
Snae 10,000 Snae			Romance	
Tep Songva	Chea Vanna	Sok Sophea, Eng Rithy, Veth Rattana	Legendary	
The Weird Villa		Suos Sokunthea, Tep Rundaro, Sim Solika	Suspense	

== 2005 ==
Title	Director	Cast	Genre	Notes
2005
Angareak Runteas Aek Putong		Ae Phuthong	Action	
Ah Jey Neang Krod			Legendary	
The Blind and the Crippled		Tep Rundaro	Legendary, Comedy	
Aso Oun Pong		Eng Rithy, Veth Rattana	Drama	
Athitvongsa Sisoriyavong		Keo Pisey, Heng Dary, Meng Bunlo, Danh Monika	Legendary	
Beisach Klach Kmouch			Horror	
Boremei Preah Borima Meas		Danh Monika	Legendary	
Ghost Banana Tree	Heng Tola	Sang Posda, Ly Taro	Horror	
Klaeng Aek			Legendary	
Kmouch Preay Asorakai			Horror	§
Kone Prosa Puos			Legendary	
Ktum Moranak			Horror	
Neak Ta Kleang Meung		Yuthara Chany, Keo Pich Pisey	Legendary	
"Phyea Bat"		Meas Soksophea, Aok sokunkanha	Horror	
Neang Keo Nama Tida Muk Ses		Heng Bunleap, Danh Monika	Legendary	
Neang Macha		Ly Chan Siha	Legendary	
Pka Angkeabos		Danh Monika	Legendary	
Pleung Ches Ahp			Horror	
Prasna Reatrey	Ly Kim Srun	Sok Sophea, Veth Rattana	Legendary	
Preah Ko Preah Keo		Tep Rindaro, Suos Sothera	Legendary	
Preah Leak Sinavong Neang Pream Kesor		Heng Bunleap, Keo Pisey, Prum Ratha	Legendary	
Reamke		Sok Sophea, Keo Pich Pisey	Legendary	
Sdach Domrei Sor		Chan Leakenna	Legendary	
Snam Monkol Snae			Romance	
The Burnt Theatre	Rithy Panh		Drama	Screened at the 2005 Cannes Film Festival
The Crocodile	Mao Ayuth	Preap Sovath, Sim Solika, Neay Prek, Dy Saveth Legendary		
The Forest (2005 film)	Heng Tolda			
The Haunted House (2005 film)	Heng Tola	Huy Yalong, Chan Nary	Horror	
The Motherless			Horror	
Tuk Jet Ovpuk		Tep Rundaro	Drama	
Tuk Rom Pka Rom		Eng Rithy, Meng Bunlo, Keo Pisey	Legendary	
Veal Srey Sronoss		Veth Rattana	Legendary, Romance	
Vengeance		Veth Rattana	Horror	
Bandasa sneha Kropeur Charavan		Yuk Tith Ratha	Legendary	

== 2006 ==
Title	Director	Cast	Genre	Notes
2006
Amatak Snae		Cheun Edom	Romance	
Besdong Neak Prodal	Parn Puong Bopha		Action	
Bondasa		Sarai Sakana	Legendary, Romance	
Boremei Phnom Jruke		Sok Sophea, Keo Pich Pisey	Legendary	
Buffalo Protecting Child			Action	
Domrei Kbal 3 Kundung Sam Pon		Veth Rattana	Legendary	
Jao Sok Jao Sanh			Legendary	
Jumneu Kmouch			Horror	
Jumno Pume Bakprea		Sarai Sakana	Romance	
Jumnuonh Prumajarey		Meas Somavatey	Drama	
Kaék Prot Bongkong		Eng Rithy, Ouk Somarima	Legendary, Romance	
Kmouch Neang Tey			Legendary, Horror	
Kmouch Propun Ah Tuy			Horror	
Komheng Kmouch Tuk			Horror	
Komloss Steu Kae Snae Neak Memai		Sok Sophea, Sim Solika	Comedy	
Kompull Kbach Kun			Action	
Konsaeng Krohom		Danh Monika	Legendary, Romance	
Majass Bumnul Gam	Mong Kineth	Sok Sophea, Meas Sorika	Legendary	
Mjass Tonle Mekong			Legendary, Romance	
Mjass Sok Gam			Legendary	
Mek Nov Mean Punleu			Drama	
Mr.Mao			Comedy	
Neang Badaja			Romance	
Neang Jann			Legendaray	
Neang Pumary		Yok Tith Ratha	Horror	
Neang Puon		Tep Rindaro, Veth Rattana	Action	
Nokor Srey Lavor		Sok Sophea, Keo Pich Pisey	Legendary	
Ok Prot Tronum		Sovann Makura, Veth Rattana	Legendary, Romance	
Pey Neang Leak		Keo Pisey	Legendary	
Pka Roy Jaol Klen			Romance	
Pleung Snae Yuvekvey			Romance	
Prey Taihoung			Horror	
Propun Pa Songsa Kone		Sok Sophea	Comedy	
Prum Daen Duong Jet			Romance	
Prumliket			Drama	
Reatrey Leak		Veth Rattana	Legendary	
Roduv Rongea		Duch Sophea	Romance	
Sang Snae Knung Soben		Keo Pich Pisey	Romance	
Sarai Neang Andeth		Danh Monika	Legendary	
Shadow of the Violin			Romance	
Snaeha Srok Srae		Eng Rithy, Veth Rattana	Romance	
Sompong Sok Tum			Legendary	
Soniya		Duch Sophea	Romance	
Soriya Lngeach Tngai		Dy Saveth, Heng Bunleap, Danh Monika	Legendary, Romance	
Sromoul Snae Sita		Tep Rindaro, Suos Sotheara	Legendary	
Stung Tuk Pneik			Legendary	
Teayeat Aseurapeus			Horror	
The Golden Voice			Drama	
The Red Sense	Tim Pek		Thriller	
The Snake King's Grandchild	Fai Som Ang	Meng Bunlo, Chan Leakenna	Legendary	
The Wall of Love			Romance	
Tuk Pneik Srey Peusya		Meas Somavatey	Drama	
Tunakam Snaeha		Sok Sophea, Keo Srey Neang	Romance	
Tun Daek Khum Jivit			Romance	
Turasap Pdach Prolung		Khat Sokhim	Horror	
Veasna Srey Kmao			Romance	
Vetamun Preah Ko		Sovann Makura	Legendary	
Villa Horror	Heng Tola		Horror	
Wat Jeung Korp		Sim Solika	Horror	

== 2007 ==
Title	Director	Cast	Genre	Notes
2007
A Teacher's Heart	Hun Sen	Tep Rindaro, Suos Sotheara	Horror	
Bokator (film)	Tim Pek	Antonio Graceffo	Legendary	
Bop Soniveas	Mong Kineth	Sok Sophea, Meas Sorika	Legendary	Sequence to Majass Bomnul Gam
Bromatt Bromong			Legendary, Horror	
Boremei Jomnieng Pteas			Horror	
Chao Kombet Buntos		Sovann Makura	Legendary	
Chet Reusya		Ouk Somarima	Romance	
Ethipol		Sarai Sakana	Legendary	Sequence to Bodasa
Holly (film)	Tim Pek		Drama	
Jompa 4 Daum		Heng Bunleap	Legendary	
Jomrieng Neak Srae		Eng Rithy	Drama, Suspense	
Jruos Moranak			Horror	
Kong Dai Alai Snae		Eng Rithy	Drama	
The Kontong Kiev Witch			Horror	
Kromum Jole Malup		Heng Bunleap	Legendary	
Kumlang Nung Veasna		Veth Rattana	Horror	
Kumnum Junjien Morodok		Heng Bunleap	Suspense	
Kumnum Pi Adetajear		Eng Rithy, Tep Rindaro, Keo Pich Pisey	Suspense	
Kun Chang Kun Paen		Sok Sophea, Veth Rattana	Legendary	
Lbech Leu Lbech		Suos Sokunthea, Veth Rattana	Comedy	
Le papier ne peut pas envelopper la braise	Rithy Panh		Drama	
Majass Vimean Atgombang		Sok Sophea, Keo Pich Pisey	Legendary	
Nesai Snae Gam			Horror	
Nona Komnot		Tep Rindaro, Veth Rattana	Drama	
Peak Hun Besdong			Action	
Pka Sropone		Heng Bunleap	Romance	
Pno Satya		Sim Solika	Horror	
Preah Moha Monkaline		Sovann Makura, Danh Monika	Legendary	
Prolung Kmouch		Veth Rattana	Horror	
Pukol Koma		Heng Bunleap	Legendary	
Puje Muoy Truoy 2		Yu Disco	Drama	
Reachany Puos		Keo Pich Pisey	Legendary	
Sok Krodanh		Eng Rithy	Horror	
Snae Min Chneas Chnet		Sok Sophea	Comedy	
Srok Srae Snae Knhom		Khieu Sompeth, Danh Monika	Romance	
Sromoul Atgombang			Suspense	
Sromoul Kraom Pneik		Keo Pich Pisey	Comedy	
Staying Single When		Meng Bunlo, Sarai Sakana	Romance, Comedy	
Tep Tida Kondao Sor		Eng Rithy, Danh Monika	Legendary	
Tngai Reas Banhjras Teus		Veth Rattana	Romance	
Tropeang Peay		Heng Bunleap, Danh Monika	Legendary	
True Love			Romance	
Secret Well		Tep Rindaro, Suos Sokunthea	Suspense	
Palace of Dreams		Sarai Sakana	Romance	
Vinhean		Sovann Makura, Veth Rattana	Horror	

== 2008 ==
Title	Director	Cast	Genre	Notes
2008
Annoyed	Tim Pek		Horror	
Boros Jak Smok		Tep Rindaro	Romance	
Jontem Kann Kmouch	Kem Chanthy		Horror, Comedy	
Kolap Bak Tong		Tep Rindaro, Rith Tida	Romance	
Keo Pneik Somnob Jet		Toung Thraith, Dy Saveth	Horror	
La'eng Kum Prolung		Heng Bunleap, Keo Pich Pisey	Legendary	
Maóm Srae		Tep Rindaro, Ly Marina	Drama	
Neang Sombo Meas		Danh Monika	Legendary	
Popeay Phat		Eng Rithy, Veth Rattana	Legendary	
Preay Puos	Kem Chanthy		Horror	
Sombot Sak Sit		Eng Rithy, Meas Sorika	Romance	
Un barrage contre le Pacifique	Rithy Panh		Drama	

== 2009 ==
Title	Director	Cast	Genre	Notes
2009
Ahp Kalum	Pov Pumngea	Sokun Darayu	Horror, Comedy	Produced by Classic Production
The Bravery Dies Under a Seven colored Flag		Yuthara Chany	Legendary	
Enemies of the People	Teth Sombath	Teth Sombath, Nuon Chea	Documentary	
Kmouch Luong Pass Sok	Pov Pumngea	Sokun Darayu	Horror	Produced by Classic Production
Pume Neak Klahan	Lim Sokhon	Yuthara Chany	Legendary	
Residue	Tim Pek		Suspense	
The Twin Diamonds	Davy Chou		Suspense	Produced by Kun Khmer Kone Khmer
Vanished	Tom Som	Saray Sakana, Chea Vannarith, Pov Kisan, Nop Sophorn, Pich Serey Rath	Thriller	Produced by Khmer Mekong Films

== See also ==
- List of Khmer entertainment companies
- List of Khmer film actors
- List of Khmer film directors
