= List of Cambodian film actors =

This list of Cambodian actors is incomplete. The list consists of Cambodian actors particularly from the 1950s through the present day.

== B ==
- Norodom Buppha Devi (1960s)

== C ==
- Chum Kèm (1960s)

== D ==
- Danh Monica (2001–present)
- Dy Saveth (1962–1975, 1993–present)

== H ==
- Hin Channiroth (2007–present)
- Huy Yaleng (2000s)
- Huy Sann (1960s-1970s)

== K ==
- Keo Montha (1960s)
- Keo Pich Pisey (2000s)
- Kong Som Eun (1960s and 1970s)
- Kong Som At (1970s)
- Kong Ni-Yo (1960s)

== M ==
- Mak Sensonita (2010–present)
- Mean Sonyta (2009–present)
- Meas Sam-El (1960-1975)

== N ==
- Nary Hèm (1960s)
- Norithia (1960s)
- Nob Nèm (1960s-1970s)
- Norodom Sihanouk (1960s)

== O ==
- Ompor Thevy/Ampor Tevi (1980s and 1990s)
- Ao Dum (1960s-1970s)

== P ==
- Peng Phan (1990s)
- Péch Saloeurn (1960s-1970s)
- Pisith Pilika (1980s and 1990s)
- Preap Sovath (2000s)

== R ==
- Rosanara (1960s)

== S ==
- Saksi Sbong (1960s and 1970s)
- Saom Bopha (1970s)
- Saom Vansodany (1960s and 1970s)
- Saravuth (1970s)
- So Hean (1960s and 1970s)

== T ==
- Tep Rundaro (1980s–present)
- Tit Vichara-Dany (1960s–1970s)

== V ==
- Vann Vannak (1960s and 1970s)
- Veth Rattana (2000s)
- Virak Dara (1960s and 1970s)

== Y ==
- Yeun Savuth (2014–present)
