= Matthew Baylis =

British novelist, screenwriter and journalist

- Born: 1971 (age 54–55); Nottingham, England
- Other names: Matt Baylis, M. H. Baylis
- Occupations: Novelist, screenwriter and journalist

Matthew Baylis (born 1971), also known as Matt Baylis and M. H. Baylis, is a British novelist, screenwriter and journalist.

== Early life ==
Baylis was born in Nottingham. He was educated at Merchant Taylors' Boys' School, Crosby, and Trinity College, Cambridge, and spent most of his early years in Southport, Merseyside.

== Career ==
A former storyliner on BBC One's flagship soap opera EastEnders, he adapted Catrin Collier's novel Hearts of Gold, set in the 1930s, for the screen, and this was broadcast as a two-parter on BBC One in July 2003.

He subsequently went with former EastEnders executive producer Matthew Robinson to Kenya, where he co-created, co-storylined and trained a team of local writers for a six-part drama pilot. Robinson later invited him to Cambodia, to do the same on Taste of Life, a major Cambodian drama series funded by the BBC World Service Trust and the Department for International Development.

Continuing his involvement in Cambodia, Baylis scripted Palace of Dreams, a BBCWST-funded romantic comedy film, aimed at younger audiences; Vanished – a film-noir thriller made by Robinson's company Khmer Mekong Films, which showed to great acclaim across Cambodia in 2009, and has been shown at the Pyongyang International Film Festival; and he co-created, and wrote scripts for AirWaves, a contemporary drama series funded by the U.S. government, which aired on Cambodia's TV channel CTN.

The author of two comic novels, Stranger than Fulham and The Last Ealing Comedy he was the television critic for the Daily Express from September 2005 until August 2018 and has also written on television and other subjects for The Guardian, The Sunday Times, The Daily Telegraph, Independent on Sunday, Daily Mail and The Jewish Chronicle

His third novel A Death at the Palace is a crime thriller set in Tottenham - the first in the Rex Tracey series - and it was published by Old Street on 13 March 2013.

After being awarded a first class degree from Cambridge, in the disciplines of anthropology and theology, Baylis began describing himself as an 'amateur anthropologist' and his 2013 book Man Belong Mrs Queen gives an account of his time on Tanna Island, Vanuatu, researching the Prince Philip Movement . In December 2013 and January 2014 the book was BBC Radio 4's Book of the Week.

Baylis was interviewed by a number of media outlets following the death of HRH Prince Philip, on 9 April 2021. In an interview with Sally Guyoncourt for i-News on 10 April 2021, he suggested that the late Duke's grieving followers might transfer their allegiance to Prince/King Charles.

He was also interviewed on 12 April 2022 by the BBC's Chief International Correspondent Lyse Doucet for the daily programme Newsday, endeavouring to give listeners a snapshot of the Philip movement's history and explaining his own, personal connection to the late Duke.

Baylis's fourth novel, and the second in the Rex Tracey series of Haringey-set crime thrillers, is The Tottenham Outrage published on 15 July 2014 by Old Street. As well as a contemporary mystery on the streets of North London, this book presents a fact-based, but fictionalized re-imagining of the real Tottenham Outrage, a bungled robbery attempt by Russian anarchists in January 1909.

His fifth novel, and the third in the Rex Tracey series of Haringey-set crime thrillers is Black Day At The Bosphorus Café, which was published by Old Street on 28 May 2015. It concerns a pair of suspicious deaths in the multi-cultural melting pot of Rex's beloved 'manor', Wood Green: one, a young Kurdish activist, the second, a council whistleblower. Whilst reporting the story, and following his suspicions, Rex ventures into a dangerous landscape of honour-killings, high level corruption and clashing traditions.
