= Peay =

Peay is a surname. Notable people with the surname include:

- Austin Peay (1876–1927), Governor of Tennessee from 1923 until his death in 1927
- Clint Peay (born 1973), retired U.S. soccer defender and head coach
- Francis Peay (born 1944), retired American football offensive tackle and head coach
- J. H. Binford Peay III (born 1940), retired four-star General from the United States Army
- John H. Peay (born 1935), American politician

== See also ==
- Austin Peay State University, accredited public university located in Clarksville, Tennessee
- Austin Peay Governors, the above school's athletic program
- Preah Peay Phat, 1971 Khmer film directed by Ly You Sreang starring Kong Som Eun and Vichara Dany
- Tropeang Peay, 1970 Khmer film starring Kong Som Eun and Vichara Dany
