= List of Khmer entertainment companies =

This is a list of notable companies and people of the Cambodian film and entertainment industry.

== Companies ==
=== Founded in the 1960s ===
- TVK (Khmer) (since 1966), Cambodia's original broadcasting station; broadcast in black and white until 1986

=== Founded in the 1970s ===
- Pisnoka (1970-1975), owned by actor Vann Vannak, and all films of which he plays the leading male role
- Sovann Kiri (1972-1984), a now-defunct Khmer-Thai joint film company owned by movie stars Dy Saveth and Hui Keung; ran in Cambodia 1972-1975; ran in Hong Kong 1975-1984

Film and entertainment companies founded after the fall of the Khmer Rouge in 1979 include:

=== Founded in the 1980s ===
- CM (international film) (since 1985), owned by Sem Sovandeth

=== Founded in the 1990s ===
- Angkorwat films (since 1990), owned by Yvette Som
- Reksmey Hang Meas (since 1990)
- SM (since 1990), owned by Mai Sameth

=== Founded in the 2000s ===
- Khmer Entertainment Inc. (since 2005), CEO Lim Cheang; an entertainment promotion company targeting Cambodian Americans; sponsors high-profile singers in Cambodia and holds large scale performances in various US cities
- Khmer Mekong Films (since 2006); a film and television production company based in Phnom Penh, the capital of Cambodia

== People ==
Notable Cambodian film producers and directors include:

- Fey Som Ang (1989–present), Cambodian film director; also associated with Thai film productions
- Parn Puong Bopha (1989–present), Cambodian film director
- Kong Buncheun, novelist; music composer, producer, and director since the 1950s
- Tea Lum Kang, Chinese-Cambodian film director of the 1970s; directed the Cambodian film Pos Keng Kang
- Huy Kung, Chinese-Cambodian film director of the 1970s and 80s
- Brendan Moriarty (2003-present), American-Cambodian director and producer
- Rithy Panh (1988–present), French-trained Cambodian producer
- Ieu Pannakar (b. 1931 – d. 2018), film director from the 1950s
- Channy Peakdey, film director since 1989; directed the 1994 version of Promatt Promong
- Tim Pek (1975–present), Australian-Cambodia film director and producer
- Matthew Robinson, British-Cambodian founder of Khmer Mekong Films
- Dy Saveth, film producer and actress from the 1970s; also associated with Thai film productions
- King Norodom Sihanouk, former king; directed more than 46 Khmer films, 43 of which were produced after his abdication in 1955
- Yvette Som (1990–present), producer of Angkorwat studio films
- Mao Somnang, Cambodian novelist and screenwriter of the 1980s and 90s
- Tat Somnang, Cambodian, singer, producer, and film director of the 1970s
- Vann Vannak, film director and actor from the 1970s
