= Vikaljarek =

- Directed by: Huy Yaleng
- Written by: Huy Yaleng, At Sotheavy, Svay Leemeng, Soung Mak, Soung Brosbrathna
- Starring: Huy Yaleng; Vandy Piseth; Vathtey Chhom
- Distributed by: PuPrum Entertainment
- Release date: 2 December 2016
- Country: Cambodia
- Language: Khmer

Vikaljarek is a Khmer horror film directed by Huy Yaleng. It stars Huy Yaleng, Vandy Piseth and Vathtey Chhom. At the time of its release, it was one of the few Khmer films that were in the horror genre.

== Background ==
The title of the film translated means psychosis. It was released on 2 Dec 2016. The locations it was filmed in include, Central Market, on Monivong Boulevard, also the post office. A month after its screening in China, it was set to go to Thailand. General Manager of PuPrum Entertainment revealed that his company was working with Westec Media Limited to export it to Laos. In 2005 Huy Yaleng was assistant director at CamPro Films, and worked on the film Pteah khmaoch tinh. Along with Welcome to Hell, Diamond Island and Love to the Power of 4, it was one of four PuPrum Entertainment films that had their trailers shown at a press conference held at the VIP Lounge of Major Cineplex, 2nd Floor AEON Mall on September 19, 2016.

=== Story ===
Sopheap is a man works on a building site in Phnom Penh . When he was a child, he lost his family. They were killed. He also suffers from psychotic episodes. Vichet is his friend. he is suffering from bullying at his work place as well as people he comes across. One day the bullies start to die.

== Reception abroad ==
The film attracted attention in China. One of the very few horror films to come out of Cambodia, it got an exclusive screening at The First Lanmei International Film Week, held in Nanjing, China in December 2016. It managed to pick up the "Screening Award" there. Director Yaleng was also asked for permission for his film to be shown at schools in Nanjing as well as it be shown at the Ministry of Arts. Local film makers had also expressed interest in buying the rights to the film so it could be remade.

== Specs ==
Running Time: 1 Hour 25 Minutes Distributor: PuPrum Entertainment
