= Ghost Banana Tree =

Cambodian movie based on a ghost story

Ghost of Banana Tree
- Poster for "Ghost of Banana Tree"
- Directed by: Heng Tola
- Written by: Mao Samnang
- Produced by: Heng Tola
- Starring: Sang Posda; Ly Taro
- Distributed by: Campro production
- Release date: 24 July 2004 (Cambodia)
- Running time: 120 minutes
- Country: Cambodia
- Language: Khmer

Ghost of Banana Tree (Khmer: ខ្មោចដើមចេកជ្វា, romanized: Khmaôch Daeum Chék Chvéa) is a 2004 film. It is a Cambodian horror film based on a Cambodian ghost story about a vengeful ghost haunting a banana tree and killing her husband. It is the fourth horror film by Campro Production, following Neang Neath, The Forest, and The Haunted House.

== Plot ==
The story is based on a Khmer tale. A man goes abroad for business. While he is away, his wife falls ill and dies. Her vengeful spirit begins to haunt the people of the village. The husband returns and believes his wife's ghost is actually his living wife until her ghost's arm grows unnaturally long. He flees the house for help, but, even after a proper Khmer burial, his wife's ghost follows him to a Buddhist monk's house, where he has sought safety. As he recites prayers, his wife's ghost climbs one of the many nearby banana trees to enter the house through a window. (It is traditionally considered inauspicious by the Khmer to grow banana trees close to a house, especially near a window.) She kills her husband, and the film ends with the couple's spirits flying to begin their next life together.

== Origins ==
The film is based on a Cambodian legend, marketed by Campro Production as a true event, which occurred at least during the 16th century. A folk belief, which many Khmer still follow, stems from this legend, forbidding people from planting banana trees next to their houses as a ghost spirit could enter the house by climbing in on a banana leaf. If there was already a banana tree growing close by, all of the banana tree's leaves touching or near the house would be cut off for safety. This centuries-old tradition is most common in more remote areas today.

== See also ==
- Nang Tani
- List of ghost films
