= Campro Production =

Cambodian film and karaoke production company

CamPro Production (CP) the full word is (Cambodia Production) was a Cambodian film and Karaoke production company based in Phnom Penh that operated from 2003 to 2007.

== History ==
The company was founded in early 2003 by Cambodian Mr.Heng Tola company that imported Asian horror films. Heng Tola was the producers and Director. The company was formerly the owner of Kirirom Cinema, which closed in 2007 and was turned into a nightclub.

Their first film, Gratefulness, was inspired by the true life story of a young girl. The film has many similarities to the Thai 1980s drama Walli.

The next movie was a period horror film called Neang Neath, which performed well at the Cambodia box office. The film was a remake of the Thai film Nang Nak. The company made several Karaoke as well in this period, but discontinued in late 2004 to concentrate on making movies.

The next projects were successful horror genre films such as The Forest, The Haunted House, and Ghost Banana Tree, the highest grossing film for the company.

CamPro Productions received coverage for their highly professional work and quality productions.

Despite the current taste for horror movies, Heng Tola believes a more serious trend is emerging, prompted in part by the resentment many Cambodians feel about their colonial past and toward domineering neighbours such as Thailand and Vietnam. The company produced some dramas and comedies, including Gratefulness, Motherless, Mr. Mao, The Wall of Love, and The Painter' (film) but most failed at the box office. The Wall of Love was pulled from the screen after being screened for less than a week. The Painter was a minor success at the box office.

CamPro Films closed in 2007, amid declining film viewership in the country.

== Awards ==
Some of the films, including Gratefulness and The Forest, were nominated for awards at the Khmer national film festival.

== Filmography ==
- កត្តញ្ញូ Gratefulness (2003)
- នាងនាថ Neang Neath (2004)
- ព្រៃអាគម The Forest (2005)
- ផ្ទះខ្មោចទិញ The Haunted House (2005)
- កូនអត់ម្តាយ Motherless (2005)
- ខ្មោចដើមចេកជ្វា Ghost Banana Tree (2005)
- ម៉ៅស្វិត Mr. Mao (2005)
- ភូមិគ្រឹះខ្មោច Villa Horror (2006)
- ល្បែងសួរខ្មោច The Game (2006)
- កំពែងស្នេហ៍ The Wall of Love (2006)
- ព្រាយកន្ទោងខៀវ The Konthong Keav Witch (2006)
- ខ្លាចអីញោម What Do You Scare Of (2007)
- រន្ធត់២៤ម៉ោង Shock 24 Hours (2007)
- ជាងគំនូរ The Painter (2007)
- កូនអើយម្តាយខ្មោច The Mother (2017)
