= Taste of Life (disambiguation) =

Taste of Lifeis a Taiwanese drama television program

Taste of Life may also refer to:

- Ruos Cheat Jivit (Taste of Life), Cambodian medical drama series and soap opera
- Una botta di vita (Taste of Life), 1988 Italian comedy film
