= Huy Yaleng =

Cambodian film director

- ហ៊ុយ យ៉ាឡេង
- Born: 1979 (age 46–47); Banteay Meanchey, Thai-Cambodian border
- Other names: Kaktha Chey
- Occupations: Director; producer; writer; actor
- Years active: 2000-present
- Known for: Banana Tree Ghost, Vikaljarek, The Witch, Fathers

Huy Yaleng is a Cambodian film director and actor. As an actor, he acted in The Haunted House. He worked on Vikaljarek in the capacity of actor and director. Other films from his country that he has worked on include Banana Tree Ghost and Mao Svet (Stingy Person).

== Background ==
Yaleng was born around 1979 and spent time in a refugee camp.

== Career ==
=== Director ===
In the 2000s Yaleng was assistant director at CamPro Films.

He directed the film Vikaljarek, which was released on December 2, 2016. It was one of four PuPrum Entertainment films with their trailers shown at a press conference held at the VIP Lounge of Major Cineplex, 2nd Floor AEON Mall on September 19, 2016. It attracted positive attention in China and picked up "The Screening Award" there.

In December 2016, he voiced his displeasure with seeing foreign films getting more attention in his country than locally made films.

=== Actor ===
He acted alongside Chan Nary and Prak Sambath in the Heng Tola directed Pteah khmaoch tinh, which was released in 2005. In his film Vikaljarek, he played the part of Sopheap, a Phnom Penh building site worker who suffers from psychotic episodes, and also suffers from bullying at his work with the bullies starting to die.

== Filmography (selective) ==
- Pteah khmaoch tinh (aka The Haunted House)
- Ghost Bought a House
- Ghost is on the Banana Tree
- Mao Svet (Stingy Person)
- Vikaljarek
- The Torment of Ghost
- The Witch
- Fathers
- Ghost Possession
