= Mak Sensonita =

Cambodian actress (born 1994)

- ម៉ាក សែនសូនីតា
- Born: 14 March 1994 (age 32); Kandal Province, Cambodia
- Other name: Tota (តូតា)
- Occupations: Actress; fashion model
- Years active: 2010-present

Mak Sensonita (Khmer: ម៉ាក សែនសូនីតា) is a Cambodian actress. Sensonita is also a model for some magazines. She began her entertainment career in 2010.

== Filmography ==
- 2016: នាយខ្វាក់នាយខ្វិនឆ្លងភព
- 2016: Chantrei
- 2017: កូនពស់កេងកង
- 2017: ព្រាយកន្ទោងខៀវ

== See also ==
- List of Khmer film actors
