= Mean Sonyta =

Cambodian actress and fashion model (born 1990)

- មាន សូនីតា
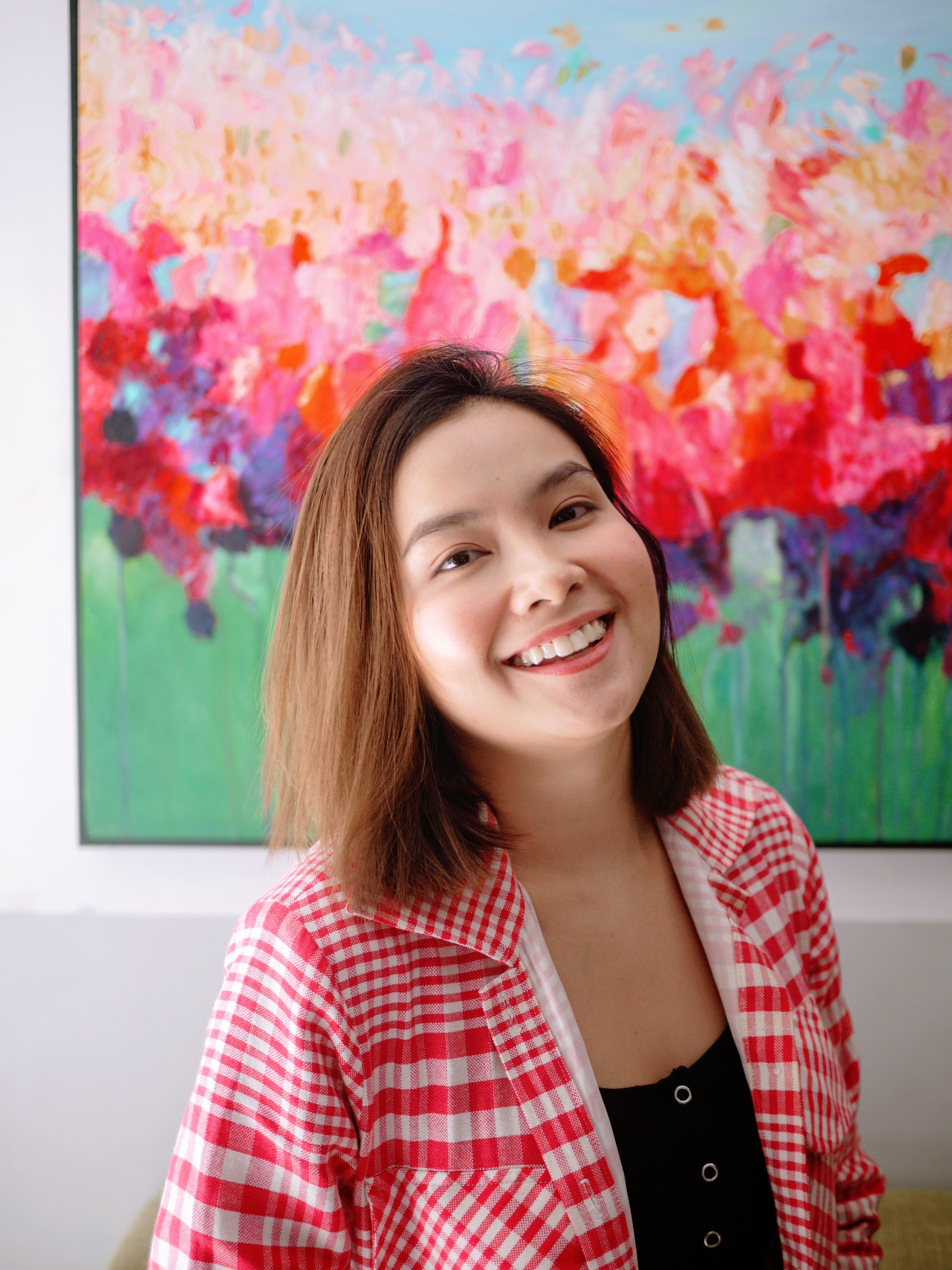
- Mean Sonyta at Story Coffee Roasters, Phnom Penh.
- Born: 10 February 1990 (age 35); Kampong Cham Province, State of Cambodia
- Occupations: Actress; fashion model
- Years active: 2009–present
- Website: www.meansonyta.com

Mean Sonyta (Khmer: មាន សូនីតា; born 10 February 1990) is a Cambodian actress and fashion model. Sonyta joined a local beauty contest Freshie Girls & Boys (season 8) 2009. She was a 3rd runner up with an award of Miss Popular. She began her career in 2009. She entered the film industry and starred in her debut film បេះដូងអ្នកការពារ which was a lead to local audiences. Then her big hit on screen was a series of Loy9 and Love9 film by BBC Media Action Cambodia.

== Films ==
- 2009: បេះដូងអ្នកការពារ
- 2012: នាយឡប់ជំពប់ស្នេហ៍
- 2013: អ្នកមានគុណ
- 2014: ស្នេហ៍៩
- 2017: ស្នេហ៍ស្វ័យគុណ៤
- 2018: ផ្កាថ្ម

== Awards and honours ==
- 2009: Freshie Girls & Boys (season 8) 3rd runner up
- 2013: Miss Popular Magazine Cover

== See also ==
- List of Khmer film actors
