= Hin Channiroth =

Cambodian MC and actress

- ហ៊ិន ចាន់នីរ័ត្ន
- Born: 15 April 1990 (age 35); Phnom Penh, State of Cambodia
- Occupations: MC; actress
- Years active: 2007-present
- Website: www.bayontv.com.kh

Hin Channiroth (Khmer: ហ៊ិន ចាន់នីរ័ត្ន; born 15 April 1990) is a Cambodian MC and actress. She is an MC on Bayon Television for a program called Cha Cha Cha and also a model for some magazines. Channiroth began her entertainment career when she was only 17.

== Filmography ==
=== Film ===
Year	English title	Khmer title
2017	The Witch	ធ្មប់

=== Television show ===
Year	Title	Network
2010- present	Cha Cha Cha	Bayon TV
2015- 2017	The Style	Bayon TV

== Awards and honours ==
- 2009: Freshie Girls & Boys (season 8) Winner
- 2011: ASEAN TELEVISION CHARM
- 2012: Anachak Dara: Most Popular Female MC

== See also ==
- List of Khmer film actors
