= Sorya Shopping Center =

Shopping mall in Phnom Penh, Cambodia

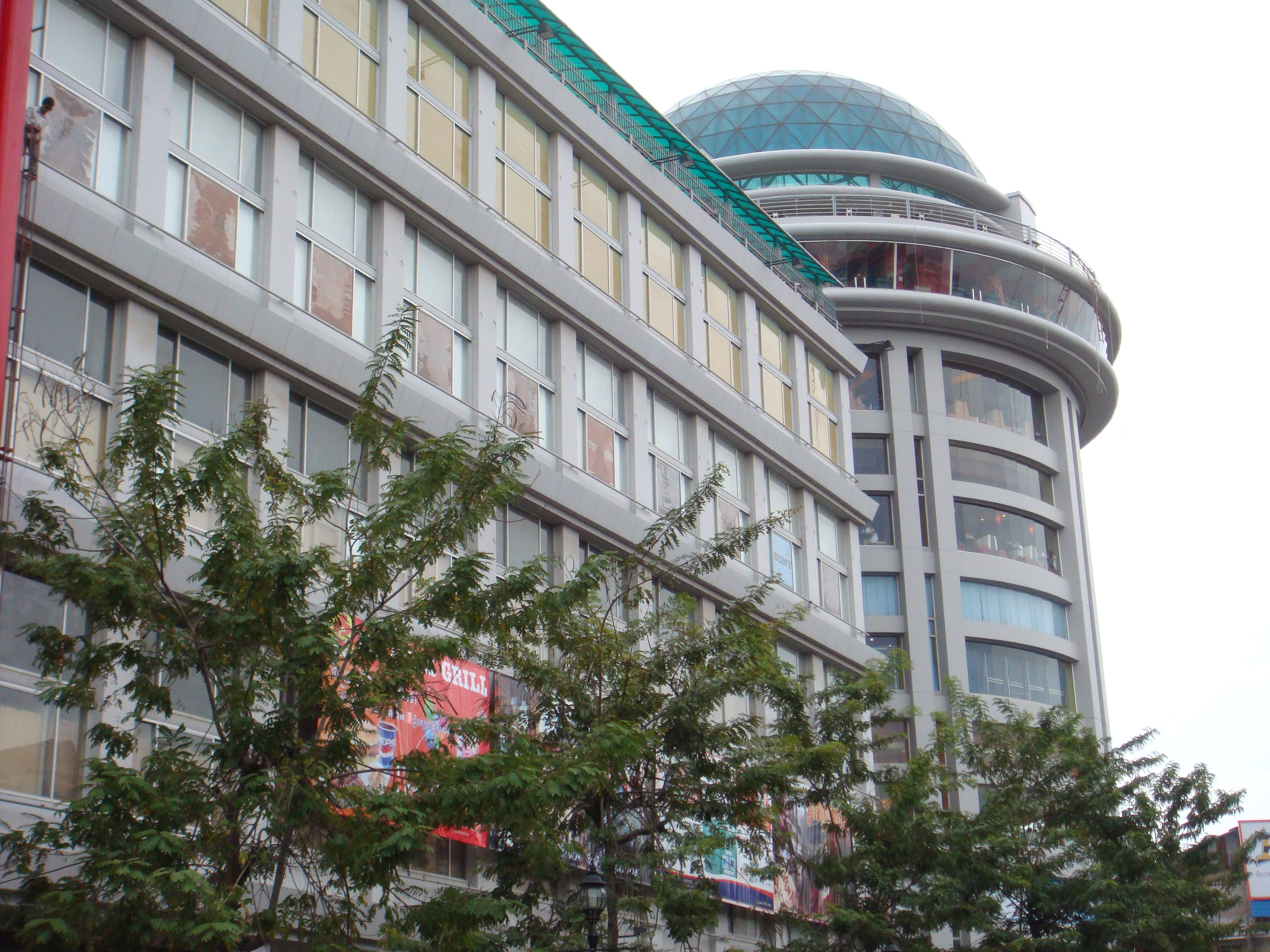
- Side view of Sorya Shopping Center
- Location: Preah Trasak Ph'em St. (63), Phnom Penh
- Coordinates: 11°34′3″N 104°55′15″E
- Opened: 2002
- Floors: 8

Sorya Shopping Center (Khmer: ផ្សារទំនើបសូរិយា, Phsar Tumneub Sorĭyéa) is a Western-styled shopping mall in Phnom Penh, Cambodia. It has 8 stories, 180 stores and a food court, including brands such as Lucky Supermarket and The Pizza Company. When it opened in 2003, it was considered to be the first western-style shopping mall in Cambodia, being the first exposure to escalators for many Cambodians. At the time it was well frequented by local youth, especially teenagers.

Since then, the mall has faced a drop in popularity due to increasing competition from newer shopping malls such as AEON and Chip Mong, prompting a $5 million renovation in 2017.

== Gallery ==
Inside the mall

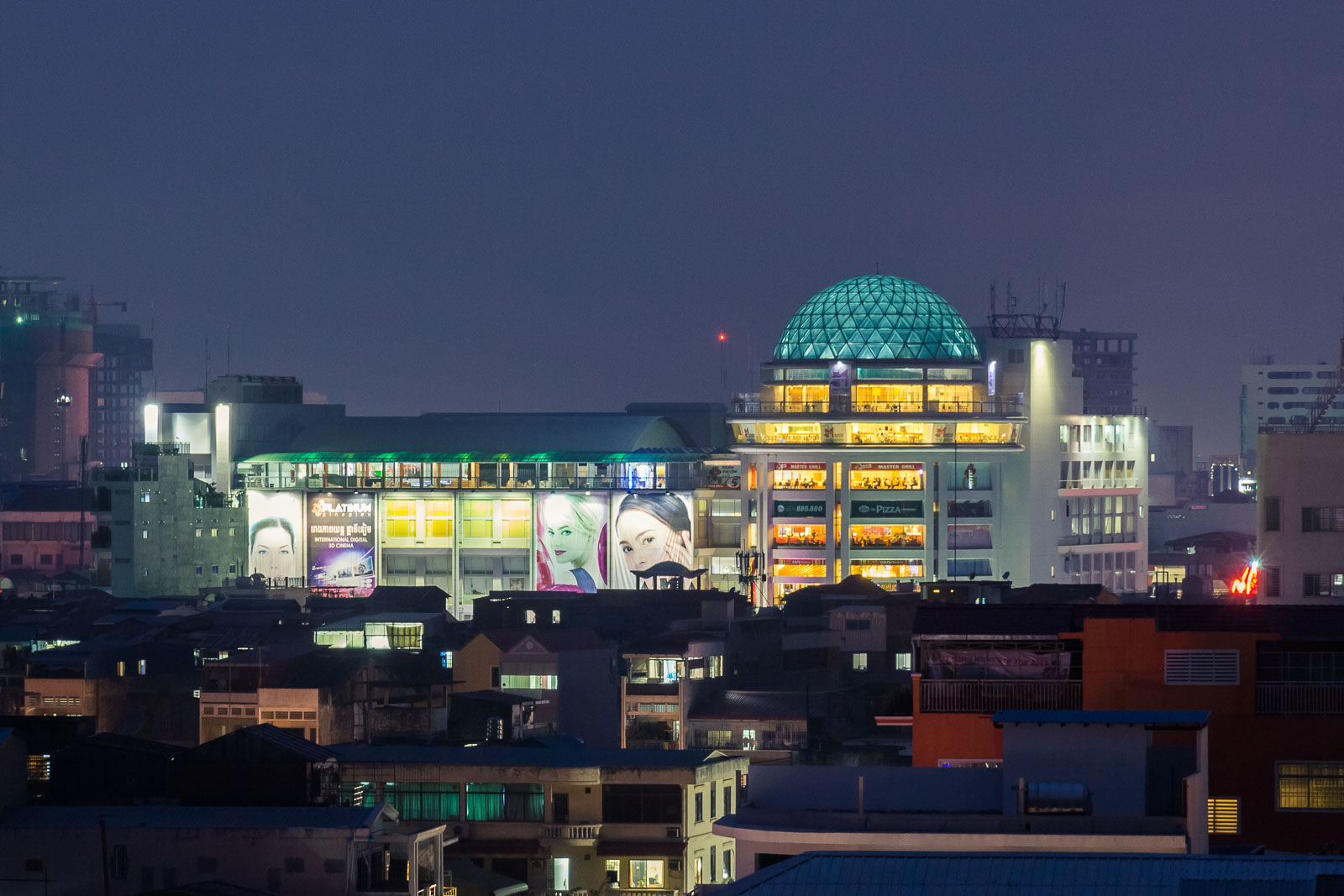
Sorya Shopping Center, Phnom Penh
