= Winai Kraibutr =

Thai actor (1969–2024)

- วินัย ไกรบุตร
- Born: June 16, 1969; Ko Lanta, Krabi, Thailand
- Died: March 20, 2024 (aged 54); CGH Saimai Hospital, Bangkok, Thailand
- Other names: Hatsanai Kraibutr; Mek
- Education: Suan Sunandha Rajabhat University
- Occupation: Actor
- Notable work: Nang Nak; Bang Rajan
- Height: 180 cm (5 ft 11 in)
- Spouse: Onchanya Kraibutr (née Chonrada Saenrangsi)

Winai Kraibutr (Thai: วินัย ไกรบุตร, RTGS: Winai Kraibut; June 16, 1969 – March 20, 2024) was a Thai actor. He appeared in a number of films that achieved significant success at the Thai box office. He was considered a bankable star in Thailand and achieved minor international exposure through the international release of Bang Rajan. Despite his considerable success in his home country, he also appeared in a joint Khmer-Thai low-budget film from Cambodia titled The Snake King's Child.

== Life ==
He came from a fishing family on Ko Lanta, Krabi province, in the Andaman coast of southern Thailand. Kraibutr entered the entertainment industry in 1992 as a model and actor, but had not achieved much success or fame until 1998, when two of his consecutively released films Nang Nak and Bang Rajan were very successful, earning more than 150 million baht and earning him the nickname "Hundred Million Hero".

In education, he received bachelor's and master's degrees from Suan Sunandha Rajabhat University.

In early 2005, shortly before the upcoming general election of the same year, he gave an interview to Nation Weekend, a weekly magazine in the Nation group, saying that he wanted to run for election in his hometown of Krabi Province under the Thai Rak Thai Party, even though he had no background in politics at all.

Kraibutr died on March 20, 2024, due to a drop in blood pressure over an infection in the bloodstream, after suffering from bullous pemphigoid for five years. He was raised Muslim, but his funeral was also held in Buddhist tradition. His son was ordained as a Buddhist novice.

== Filmography ==
- Nang Nak, 1998
- Bangrajan, 2000, international title: Bang Rajan
- Krai Thong, 2001
- Kuon puos keng kang, 2001, international title: The Snake King's Child
- Immortal Enemy, 2003
- Plon naya, 2004, alternative English and international title: Spicy Beauty Queen of Bangkok
- Queens of Langkasuka, international DVD title Pirates of Langkasuka, 2008
- Yamada: The Samurai of Ayothaya, 2010
