= PuPrum Entertainment =

Cambodian-produced films distributor

PuPrum Entertainment is a major distributor of Cambodian produced films.

== Background ==
It is a joint venture between distributors, Sabay MVP and Westec Media Ltd. The joining of Savay MVP and Westec took place in February 2016. The name is a type of combination of Ta Prohm and "Pou", which means uncle.

The task of film distribution for the organization is made easier due to the fact that Westec and Sabay have their own cinemas in Cambodia.

According to a Cinema Online article by Chantrea Kim, the aim of the organization is to enhance the quality of Khmer films which don't appear abroad. They have plans to export Khmer films as well.

== Films distributed ==
Four PuPrum Entertainment films that had their trailers shown at a press conference held at the VIP Lounge of Major Cineplex, 2nd Floor AEON Mall on September 19, 2016. They were Vikaljaret, Welcome to Hell, Diamond Island and Love to the Power of 4 The planned release for the four films was for the fourth quarter of that year.
