= The Weird Villa =

- Cover DVD
- Directed by: Nop Sombat
- Written by: Mao Samnang; Pan Pobopha
- Produced by: Nop Sombat
- Starring: Nop Bayyareth; Danh Monica
- Edited by: Heng Tola
- Distributed by: Angkorwat Production
- Release date: 8 February 2004
- Running time: 120 minutes
- Country: Cambodia
- Language: Khmer

The Weird Villa (Khmer: ភូមិគ្រឹះចម្លែក, romanized: Phumĭkrœ̆h Châmlêk) is a 2004 Khmer psychological thriller that was advertised as being based on actual events which took place during the French colonial period of Cambodia's history.

== Influences ==
With a plotline steeped in psychological horror, the movie echos the styles and themes of numerous classic foreign thrillers such as the South Korean horror film A Tale of Two Sisters, a movie which features the appearance of a similar stepmother character. The film's setting also resembled the American-Spanish The Others (2001). Some poltergeists and paranormal occurrences during the climax of the movie appear to be a nod to several scenes from M. Night Shyamalan's The Sixth Sense.

== Box office ==
The Weird Villa did well at the Cambodian box office.
