= Fathers (film) =

2020 film

- Film poster
- Directed by: Huy Yaleng
- Starring: Chy Chhenhlin
- Release date: 30 January 2020
- Running time: 110 minutes
- Country: Cambodia
- Language: Khmer

Fathers (Khmer: ដើម្បីកូន, Daeumbei Kon; lit. 'For Children') is a 2020 Cambodian drama film directed by Huy Yaleng. It was selected as the Cambodian entry for the Best International Feature Film at the 93rd Academy Awards, but it was not nominated.

== Cast ==
- Chy Chhenhlin
- Sonyta Mean
- Kong Sophy
- Huy Yaleng

== See also ==
- List of submissions to the 93rd Academy Awards for Best International Feature Film
- List of Cambodian submissions for the Academy Award for Best International Feature Film
