= Staying Single When =

- Cinema poster
- Directed by: Tom Som
- Written by: Anji Lowman Field
- Produced by: Matthew Robinson
- Starring: Meng Bunlo; Duch Sophea
- Cinematography: Bill Broomfield & In Ath
- Edited by: Sao Yoeun
- Music by: Simon Etchell; Jerry T Jones
- Distributed by: Khmer Mekong Films
- Release date: March 2007
- Running time: 100 minutes
- Country: Cambodia
- Language: Khmer
- Budget: $45,000

Staying Single When is a Cambodian romantic comedy released in March 2007. Produced by Khmer Mekong Films (KMF), the film premiered on the popular Cambodian TV channel CTN in October 2007.

In Staying Single When, KMF utilized the practice of "real voices". This contrasted with the standard Cambodian filmmaking practice of overdubbing all actors' lines with a staple group of six Phnom Penh voice-over performers, regardless of their suitability for the characters' ages or emotional performances.

The film also includes English subtitles.

== Plot ==
Beach House Hotel Manager, Sarun, attended the grand opening for the hotel in Kep. Sarun just earned a big pay raise and can now afford to get married. However, he is unsure of whom to marry.

Sarun's career is all-consuming, he has little free time for dating or even meeting new women. Other than waitresses at restaurants and the assistant manager at the hotel, Somalie, he has few women in his life. Somalie is already arranged to be wed to Neang, a family friend.

Aunt Towen and Aunt Lye step in. They lift Sarun's spirits after promising his mother on her deathbed that they would find him true love. At first, they appear to have struck gold when they introduce Sarun to a rich friend's alluring daughter, Rythika. Rythika appears to reciprocate Sarun's instant attraction. However, she turns out to be a disaster, marking the beginning of a series of unsuitable potential matches for Sarun.

Sarun's accident-prone friend Otdom, the maintenance man at the hotel, is a self-proclaimed expert in marriage; he has two wives of his own. With the aunts’ efforts backfiring, Otdom takes it upon himself to find the perfect wife for his friend, employing increasingly desperate measures along the way, but none succeed. Sarun takes matters into his hands, but to no avail.

Somalie watches from the sidelines, trying to help Sarun find happiness, but at the same time hiding hesitations about her own wedding. Gradually, she falls in love with Sarun while she is still expected to marry Neang. While Sarun's attraction for Somalie begins to grow, he never allows himself to completely fall for her because of her looming marriage.

Sarun meets Vanny, who is perfect for him, but he still isn't interested. When it dawns on him that he truly loves Somalie, he realizes he has to flee the town of Kep before her wedding because if he sees her become the wife of another man, he will be heartbroken.

== Cast ==
- Meng Bunlo as Sarun
- Duch Sophea as Somalie
- Pov Kison as Otdom
- Chhin Sotheary as Rithika
- Saray Sakana as Vanny
- Ol Samnang as Neang
- Khem Bophavy as Aunt Lye
- Talong Kanaro as Aunt Towen

== Production ==
The original title - "Finding a Wife" (Khmer: តាមរកប្រពន្ធ) - was changed to "Staying Single When" after the producers realized the parallels between the movie's plot line and a 1960s song of the same name by a famous Cambodian singer, later a victim of the Khmer Rouge. The movie was first scheduled for production in August 2006, but due to climate challenges in Kep, in which half the story is set, shooting was abandoned after two days. The production was rescheduled for October and November 2006 and continued to completion without further obstacles.
