= Vanished (2009 film) =

- Theatrical release poster
- Directed by: Tom Som
- Written by: Matthew Baylis
- Produced by: Matthew Robinson
- Starring: Saray Sakana; Chea Vannarith
- Cinematography: Bill Broomfield
- Edited by: Sao Yoeun
- Music by: Simon Etchell; Jerry T Jones
- Distributed by: Khmer Mekong Films
- Release date: September 2009
- Running time: 98 minutes
- Country: Cambodia
- Language: Khmer
- Budget: $70,000

Vanished (Khmer: Bakluon) is a 2009 Cambodian thriller film directed by Tom Som and starring Saray Sakana and Chea Vannarith. Set in the capital city, Phnom Penh, the movie tells a contemporary murder story. The two main themes deal with trust and the independence of young people in a rigidly hierarchical society.

Filmed in August and September 2008, with post-production completed in July 2009, this is the second movie from the Cambodian film and TV production company Khmer Mekong Films (KMF).

It was released in Phnom Penh's twin screen Sorya cinema, simultaneously with being screened at the Baray Andet cinema in Siem Reap, a popular tourist resort. The movie's original language is Khmer supplemented with English subtitles.

The movie attracted 13,000 within the first 10 days in Phnom Penh, generating critical acclaim in Hollywood's Variety (the first-ever Variety review of a Cambodian film filed from Cambodia) and Cambodia's Phnom Penh Post.

== Plot ==
Radio show presenter Maly deals with the personal problems of young Cambodians on a controversial nightly phone-in show. In quick succession, her co-host and producer are found dead. Maly is terrified her own life is in danger, even under police protection. As the threats mount and she feels increasingly at her wits’ end, the question for her and the audience is – will she crack before the murderer is caught?

== Cast ==
- Saray Sakana - Maly
- Chea Vannarith - Rith
- Pov Kisan - Heng
- Nop Sophorn - Chantha
- Pich Serey Rath - Kim
- Meng Savuth - Leap
- Lim Techmong - Sokhum
