= The Forest (2005 film) =

- The Forest poster.
- Directed by: Heng Tola
- Written by: Moa Samnang
- Produced by: Heng Tola
- Starring: Tan Nosar; Koa Mony Neath
- Distributed by: Campro Productions
- Release date: February 15, 2005
- Running time: 130 minutes
- Country: Cambodia
- Language: Khmer

The Forest (Khmer: ព្រៃអាគម, romanized: Prey Akôm) is a 2005 Cambodian monster thriller film directed by Heng Tola, the director of Khmer Blockbuster films, such as Gratefulness and Neang Neath. It was nominated for many awards in the Khmer national film festival, and won for best use of special effects.

== Plot ==
A group of young archaeologists go into the deep forest in Ratanakiri province to search for the old temple that was abandoned many years ago. As they go through the forest, at first they arrive at a local village but when one female Archeologist has a vision that the group of archeologist are involved in the ambush she warns the others of her vision, but they fail to listen. Later they are given a tour guide to help them find their way through the forest, but guide dies of a mysterious snake bite. The archeologists get lost and one archeologist (Asay) dies when he goes to urinate and falls into a pit of scorpions. After the group built a grave for him later, they meet a group of robbers who want to find the treasure also while exploring.

The robbers use the archeologist as a map when one robber dies by falling in a pit of snakes and a snake going into his mouth and coming out of his heart. There is no danger until they awaken a giant snake and many other monsters that existed there for hundreds of years because of a curse of a queen who was lost in the waterfalls while trying to evade traitors led by a treacherous commander who wanted her treasure. The female archeologist that had the vision is choked to death by the large snake. Later, another robber dies by the same fashion when the team is split into three groups. One male archeologist is caught in vines in a grotesque fashion: all his limbs fall off and are cut off as an arm is removed when a female wanted to help him out.

Later, a robber is eaten when the group meets up. The robber leader accuses the lead archeologist of causing the death of his men, when the snake appears. They build a raft and try to sail away but the snake catches up to them and the robber leader and an archeologist are strangled while the raft falls down a waterfall, a female was stabbed by bamboo through the stomach, and dies while the last male dies. Only one selfless female lives at the end it says happiness stems from not being greedy.

== Production ==
This is the first Khmer monster film and also the first graphic film. It was produced and distributed by Campro Production, one of the best Khmer production companies.

The film's plot is about the journey to Ratanakiri, but the footage was shot in part of Mondulkiri Province as there also were the appearance of indigenous peoples in this film.

In this film, the giant snake is actually a python, but they used special effects to make it look giant-sized. Several scenes of the film use professional computer, graphic, and sound effects techniques to make everything seem unbelievable. This production is seen as the first strong special effects film for Cambodia.

== Release ==
The film was released in only one cinema in Cambodia competing against another famous Khmer film, The Snake King's Grandchild, the sequel of Snaker which was released in four cinemas on the same date. But The Forest still grossed well in the Khmer box office as all the tickets were sold out in its opening weekend. It is considered to be one of the most successful films of early 2005 in Cambodia and was received well critically, especially on www.khmer.org which rated it 9.5 out of 10 for a job done well.

== Award ==
This film is one of four Campro Production films that were nominated for many awards at the Khmer National Film Festival. It received one award for the Best Special Effects and another Campro production's film, Gratefulness, received three awards for Best Young Actress, Best Cinematography, and the Iron award for Good Pictures went to The Crocodile by Hang Meas Production.
