= Soniya =

Soniya can be a feminine given name or a middle name. Notable people with the name include:

== Given name ==
- Soniya Akula, Indian actress
- Soniya Bhatta (born 2002), Nepalese judoka
- Soniya Dabir (born 1980), Indian cricketer
- Soniya Nityanand, Vice Chancellor of King George's Medical University, Lucknow

== Middle name ==
- Ngangbam Soniya Chanu (born 1980), Indian weightlifter

== See also ==
- Sonia (name)
