= Kong Kam Kong Keo =

- Directed by: Biv Chai Leang
- Produced by: Biv Chai Leang
- Starring: Chea Yuthon; Y Kim Sua
- Release date: 1964
- Country: Cambodia
- Language: Khmer

Gong Gam Gong Geo (Khmer: កងកម្ម កងកែវ) is a 1964 Khmer film directed by Biv Chai Leang starring Chea Yuthon and rising actress Y Kim Sua.

== Cast ==
- Chea Yuthon
- Y Kim Sua
- Kim Nova

== Release ==
Y Kim Sua died while making this film. Due to her eye tragedy after performing a scene in the movie, this film was never released; But instead, it was completed as a novel while the film was used as an archive.

== Soundtrack ==
Song	Singer(s)	Notes
Jivit Kong Kam	Sinn Sisamouth	
Troung Anetha	Keo Setha	

== Remakes ==
This film has been remade in 2004. The latest version of this film, released in 2004, stars Eng Rithy and Keo Pich Pisey.

== Sources ==
- "Nostalgie films khmers avant 1975". nostalgie-films-khmers-avant-1975.kazeo.com (in French). 2010-04-02. Archived from the original on 2010-04-02.
