= Tum Teav (film) =

2003 film

Tum and Teav
- Tum Teav Logo
- Directed by: Fan Sam Ang
- Written by: Bhikkhu Som
- Produced by: Kan Socheat
- Starring: Danh Monika; Son Sophea; Chan DaraThy
- Distributed by: SSB Production
- Release date: 12 July 2003
- Running time: 120 minutes
- Country: Cambodia
- Language: Khmer

Tum Teav (Khmer: ទុំទាវ) is a 2003 Romance-tragedy Cambodian film portraying the tragedy of the star-crossed lovers Tum and Teav.

The film was inspired by a love story - Tum Teav - which has been told throughout Cambodia since the 19th century, and revived an old Cambodian proverb that says "The cake is never bigger than the basket" (នំមិនធំជាងនាឡិ), meaning that the daughters (cake) were thought that they would not find a good husband without the help of their mothers (basket).

The 2003's film of this traditional story became very popular that year in Phnom Penh, selling full box-office in all the capitals' theaters for a full season, getting good reviews to the point of being called the "fuel revival" of the long defunct Cambodian Cinema industry.

== Tagline ==
The story is summed in some verses from an old Sanskrit language translation that the original writer had used at the end of the conclusion, accompanied by few ancient alphabet and words that reveals an educational tone for this popular traditional love story:

This sin of love! The blood wash in tears!
True love! Life sacrifice in braveness against old odds
The incomparable enormous power it accomplishes
Thus, the wealth or nobility or honor still become the loser

== Plot ==
The film starts with Tum, (Son Sophea) a talented novice monk, with his friend, Pich, who are going to a village to sing a classic song. Meanwhile, Teav, (Danh Monica) the daughter of a rich woman in a village, hears some news about the handsome monk with the beautiful voice from her waitress (Kong Socheat). So she asks her mother, Pai, (Chan Daraty) to invite him to sing for at their home.

As Tum sings at the Teav's house, both fall in love at first sight. Then Teav offers Tum betel nuts and a blanket as evidence of the feelings she had for him and prays to Buddha that the young monk will be with her for eternity. Tum accepts the offer with delight to see that she feels the same as he does.

Back to the Monastery, Tum cannot stop stop thinking in Teav. The feeling grows stronger and eventually he persuades Pich to quit the monkshood. Both of them meet the abbot and talk about their intention. The abbot says that Pich can leave, but he prevents Tum of that, because he could get a bad fate if he insists. Although the advice, Tum is decided to leave in order to meet Teav. The abbot tells them that if they insist, they must defrock by themselves in the middle of the jungle and so they do.

Now as laity, they visited in secret the house of Teav, although she is "in the shade" (ក្នុងម្លប់), a traditional period of few weeks where young ladies are secluded at their home, especially far from the contact of males, in order to gain in virtue as a woman. But Teav accepts Tum in his house, hidden from her mother and they even sleep together with the complicity of the waitress, who has also feelings for Pich. As the Teav's mother is back home, Tum manages to show up as he just comes to visit the family and to announce that he is not more a monk. The mother never realizes the love affair of her daughter with the ex-monk.

The Tum's reputation for his voice as a singer reaches the King and he is invited to the royal palace to perform. The King is so amazed with his voice that names him the royal singer. At the same moment, Teav's mother is informed about the love of Teav for Tum and thus hurries to arrange an early wedding with Ngoun, the son of the Province's governor, who is a handsome but arrogant young man, who thinks he should married the most beautiful woman in town, just because he is the son of a powerful lord.

However, the village is visited by a chief of the royal guard, who sees Teav and thinks she would be a good new wife for the King. He meets the village and asked Teav and her mother to go with him to the Palace to be introduced to the King. It angers Ngoun and his father, who thinks that Pai, the Teav's mother, has deceived them. Pai cried in front of the governor claiming that it was not her idea and that she cannot do nothing, because it is a royal order. The two women are brought to the Palace and introduced to the King.

The King likes Teav very much, who seems completely upset of this new change of destiny. To her horror the King calls Tum, the royal singer, to sing a song as a celebration. Tum sings obediently in front to a crying Teav and the King notices the situation. At the end, he asked Tum why he sang that new, beautiful but sad song and why Teav was crying too much. Then, suspicious, he asked if both of them had any love affair, because if it is true, he could not take her as his wife. Tum stands honestly in front of the King and confesses his love for Teav, with her confirmation. Then the King says that he will not be an obstacle to such a love and ordered that both become marriage to the evident upset of Pai.

Back to the village, now without her daughter, Pai feels miserable, while the Governor insults her for deceiving Ngoun, his son. She feels ill and alone, but at the end creates a plan to lure Teav out of the Palace and, at her return to the village, to celebrate the wedding with Ngoun. Teav gets a message at the Palace that she must return immediately to her mother's home, because Pai is sick. When both say goodbye expecting to meet soon for their marriage, something fall to the ground and they feel it is a bad omen of separation.

When Teav is back home, she discovers with horror that her mother has arranged her immediate wedding with Ngoun. Teav cries and shouts that she is a bad mother, but Pai is determined to conclude the affair over the feelings of her daughter.

The news of the forced wedding reaches the Palace and Pich gives a message to Tum right at the moment he is going to sign for the King. When the King realizes that his Royal Order to marriage Tum and Teav will be challenged by the Governor, he becomes furious and sends an Edict in order to stop the wedding.

Tum brings the message alone and runs to the wedding, but instead of presenting the Edict, he drinks and becomes drunk, then singing in the party for Teav and kissing her in public. His behavior upsets everybody, especially Ngoun and his father, who ordered to bring Tum out of the village. Pich arrives too and tries to prevent the expulsion shouting that he has a Royal Edict, but the father of Ngoun does not hear him and expelled him too. At the same moment, Pai asked Teav to stay at home and order her guard.

Tum fights with the men who want to expel him from the village, making them more violent and led by the governor, he is persecuted and brutally beaten. At the end, due to the persistence of Tum to go back to the wedding, the governor plunges a sword in his chest, while telling him to stay away from the life of his son. Tun dies in the field, under a banyan tree before the powerless eyes of his friend, who then runs back to the wedding to communicate the event to Teav.

Teav becomes hysteric and runs to the field, while her mother cries out, trying to stop her. She runs through the jungle and finds easily the dead body of her lover. She is followed by her loyal mistress. She embraced Tum and then removes the sword and commits suicides with it. The mistress, then, terrorized, follows her example. Few minutes after Pai, Nguon, his father and villagers arrived to the place. Only in that moment the Governor finds the Edict in the dead body of Tun and feels afraid for what he has done.

In the last scene, all villagers are brought in front to the King, held in stocks. For the King, all the village was guilty of disobeying the Edicts, including children. Following the advises of his Royal Council, most villagers are condemned to die and the rest to be sold into slavery, while a wider area is crippled with heavy taxes.

== Origins ==
=== Author ===
Tum and Teav's story is originally based on the poem written by the Venerable Botumthera Som, but it was popularized by writer George Chigas and has been a compulsory part of the Cambodian secondary national curriculum since the 1950s. In fact, the earliest manuscript was done by the nineteenth-century court's poet, Santhor Mok but then found in a bad condition. This lead Botumthera som who was a monk and a poet, tried to recover the story by adding his own idea. There's been several debates for local scholar to analyse the official author to this famous story.

=== Time period ===
As with any oral tradition, pinning down the origins of the story is an elusive task. The story is believed to have originated in the 17th or 18th century and is set in Kampong Cham around a century earlier. However, in some versions the king in question is purported to be the Rea-mea who reigned in the mid-17th century, coming to the throne through an act of regicide and subsequently converting to Islam. The most popular time period for the story is known as Lovek era, a former capital where King Naresuan of Siam had intruded and looted to the ground during 1594. The story setting also deal with some real places such as Tbuong Kmoum District, Krouch Chhmar District and Kampong Chhnang Province.

=== Similarity to foreign folklore ===
The story had been viewed to resemble William Shakespeare's famous tragedy, Romeo and Juliet and was deemed as a Khmer version. The main similarity has got to be its melodramatic ending, but what the two stories strongly share in common is the role of family participation which bonds a contention for the final dramatic and sad premise. Compared to the dispute of Montague and Capulet which influence between their children matters, there are no accounts of the male protagonist's parent to be mention in the Khmer version. It is further interesting to note that the two epics additionally confronted a same fate by inspired to the play form during their days. While Romeo and Juliet ranks as one of Shakespeare's most-performed plays, Tum Teav had developed by Pich Tum Kravel into Yike, a Khmer form of theatre which become the most popular play in the Yike repertoire. To the same case, Tum Teav also become a sort of Cambodian Tristan and Iseult, their narrative poem and death conclusion prove the claims.

== Historical inaccuracies ==
- In a part when Tum was singing in Teav's house, Teav impatiently leave her room for Tum confrontation contrast with original Khmer tradition at that period to kept away their daughter from male sight under guardance.
- During lovek period, notable class people surround the palace likely to used some technique to write, unlike what feature in the film that Tum used Chicken feather to write his poem.
- There is a false scene took place around Teav's wedding with governor son which tells that Tum try to meet Teav through the front door. It opposite to the truth which record that Tum actually encounter promise with Teav through the backdoor and at least in secret.

== Release ==
This film is the first Khmer film ever to be released in more than 4 theatres in Cambodia including the biggest theatre in Cambodia. It opened with full audiences per theatre. The film has subtitles for foreign audience members. This film dropped after its release in more than four months (the longest release time film in Cambodia's history but now it is The Crocodile); the film was released again in December of the same year. This film is a successful film in Cambodia because of its positive gross in Khmer's box office.

== Book release ==
A 2005 book of Tum Teav was released as a monograph containing the author's translation of the Venerable Botumthera Som's version. It also examines the controversy over the poem's authorship and its interpretation by literary scholars and performers in terms of Buddhism and traditional codes of conduct, abuse of power, and notions of justice.

== Culture ==
A Khmer proverb states that The cake is never bigger than the basket. Nowadays, most Khmer families document it in the cultural education, so that people don't repeat the mistake that Teav's mother made. That is, love is truly based on each individual, not on the wishes of parents alone.
