= Mae Ombao Meas =

The Golden Butterfly
- Directed by: Parn Puong Bopha
- Starring: Suos Sotheara
- Distributed by: Angkorwat
- Release date: 2004
- Country: Cambodia
- Language: Khmer

The Golden Butterfly is a 2004 Khmer language romance film directed by Parn Puong Bopha. The film was distributed by Angkorwat Productions. It stars Suos Sotheara.

== Cast ==
- Suos Sotheara
