= Moranak Meada =

- Khmer DVD cover
- Directed by: Fai Sam Ang
- Written by: Fai Sam Ang; Pi kon Ann
- Starring: Ly Chan Siha; Danh Monika; Heng Bun Leap
- Distributed by: Prisean Meas Production; SSB productions
- Release date: 2004
- Running time: 120 minutes
- Country: Cambodia
- Language: Khmer

Moranak Meada (Khmer:មរណមាតា) (English - Mother Death) is a Khmer 2004 fantasy/drama film which received several awards in Khmer film festival including second prize of silver award for best movies. The film is based on Khmer old folk tales, written in verse by Dhamma Panha Ouk in 1877, which is similar to the European fairy tale Cinderella.

== Plot ==
After her mother is killed by her father during a fishing trip, Komarey gets a new name from the mother's death meaning Moranak Meada. Moranak Meada works hard every day as her life is full of sadness and misery. She is also abused by her cruel, lazy stepmother and stepsisters and her uncaring father. However, her mother's body turns into a catfish to take care of her when she is sad. But the stepmother knows and starts a plan to kill the poor catfish by using her daughter who has a face and appearance identical to Moranak Meada to lure the catfish into the trap and kill it for food. Moranak Meada finds out and cries alone under the house but a talking duck gives her the fin of her mother, so she could plant it and later that night miraculously turns into the eggplant. The stepmother cuts out the eggplant and grills it for food again but Moranak Meada finds the plant's leaf and buries it far away from the house as it suddenly grows as a little golden banyan tree which could talk to her every time she wants it to.

Many years later, Moranak Meada grows up as a beautiful and kind girl. Meanwhile, a Young King visits the village and loves the golden banyan tree and orders his servants to take it but they couldn't until he asks Moranak Meada for it as well as he crowns her as his Queen. However, the stepmother and stepsisters start a plan to kill her and manage to get her daughter as Moranak Meada but the king knows and punishes the fake Moranak Meada by killing her and chopping her into food, sent to her mother. The mother and family are afraid and try to run but they are killed by a cobra.

Now, Moranak Meada is turned into a bird by a fairy and flies to live with her husband for waiting for becoming human again, but one of the king's girls hates the bird and wants to kill it. But the bird is rescued by a white king mouse which then kills the king's girl by biting her nose.

Three years later, the king finds Moranak Meada as a human and now with a three-year-old son. They finally return to the palace and live happily ever after.
