= Pdei L'a =

- Directed by: Parn Puong Bopha
- Starring: Sim Solika; Keo Pich Pisey
- Distributed by: Angkorwat
- Release date: 2003 (Cambodia)
- Country: Cambodia
- Language: Khmer

Pdei L'a (Khmer: ប្ដីល្អ, pronounced [pɗəj lʔɑː]; lit. 'Good Husband') is a 2003 Cambodian comedy film directed by Parn Puong Bopha. The film was distributed by Angkorwat Production. It stars Sim Solika and Keo Pich Pisey.

== Plot ==
After underestimating the effort of his wife, a husband wakes up only to find himself in the shoe of a woman. He then experiences the work, worries, and pain the average household wife usually encounters.

== Cast ==
- Sim Solika
- Keo Pich Pisey
- Neun Chanteun
- Khieu Sompeth
- Yu Disco
- Andy
- Aok Sokun Kanha
