= John H. Peay =

American politician (born 1935)

Member of the Tennessee House of Representatives
- In office 1963–1968

Personal details
- Born: April 22, 1935 (age 91) Clarksville, Tennessee, U.S.
- Party: Democratic
- Education: University of Tennessee

John H. Peay (born April 22, 1935) is an American politician. He served as a Democratic member of the Tennessee House of Representatives.

== Life and career ==
Peay was born in Clarksville, Tennessee. He attended the University of Tennessee.

Peay served in the Tennessee House of Representatives from 1963 to 1968.

Peay was a state appellate court judge.
