= Mao Samnang =

Cambodian author

- ម៉ៅ សំណាង
- Born: Mao Samnang; 1959, Cambodia
- Occupation: Writer
- Children: Mao Chanraksmey
- Writing career
- Pen name: Rabbit (ទន្សាយ)
- Language: Khmer
- Years active: 1981–present
- Notable works: The Haunted House, The Snake King's Child

Mao Samnang (khmer: ម៉ៅ សំណាង) as known as Rabbit "ទន្សាយ" is a Cambodian author who has written stories for films such as The Weird Villa, The Snake King's Child and The Haunted House. She is considered to be one of the country's most popular authors.

== Background ==
Samnang started her writing around 1981. By 2016 she had more than 100 of her novels published. According to her, many of her novels have a message in them. The messages were aimed at the youth to remind or educate them about what comes of drug use. Around 2009, she was earning around US$500 for each novel which took about a month to write. As a screenwriter, the films she has scripted for are seen regularly around Phnom Penh.

== Film ==
One of her stories put to film was Snaker, released in 2001. It was directed by Fai Sam Ang and starred Winai Kraibutr, Pich Chanbormey, Tep Rindaro, and Om Portevy.

== Later years ==
Samnang Samnang stopped writing around 2014. This was due to her not being able to get a publishing deal that would allow her to write for Khmer readers. Another reason was because of problems with copyright violations.
