= Yeun Savuth =

Cambodian singer

- Born: យឺន សាវុទ្ធិ (Yeun Savuth); August 19, 1993 (age 32); Kampong Chhnang Province, State of Cambodia
- Origin: Phnom Penh, State of Cambodia
- Genres: Rap; Pop
- Occupations: Singer; songwriter; Digital Content Creator
- Instrument: Guitar
- Years active: 2015–present
- Website: savuth.digital hangmeasfm.com

Yeun Savuth (Khmer: យឺន សាវុទ្ធិ, born August 19, 1993) is a male singer in Cambodia. He records for Cambodian production company Rasmey Hang Meas. He started his career as a singer in 2015. Many people known him as well after he showed his talent in The Voice Cambodia.

== Discography ==
=== Solo albums ===
- 2014: Stung Treng Meas Bong Ery
- 2015: Yeak Laom Banlung
- 2016: Socheata Meas Bong
- 2017: Tuek Phos Sneh Knhom

== Films ==
- 2016: Kromon Siem Reap
- 2017: Love Story at Olympic Stadium

== TV Show ==
- The Voice Cambodia (season 1) 2014 on Hang Meas HDTV
- Cambodia's Got Talent (season 1) 2015 on Hang Meas HDTV
- Cambodian Idol (season 1) 2015 on Hang Meas HDTV
