= Lucky Supermarket =

Supermarket chain in Cambodia

- Company type: Supermarket chain
- Industry: Retail
- Founded: March 1993; 33 years ago in Phnom Penh, Cambodia
- Founders: Heng Hang Meng
- Headquarters: No. 01, Street 55P, Sangkat Ou Baek K’am, Khan Sen Sok, Phnom Penh, Phnom Penh, Cambodia
- Area served: Cambodia
- Products: Groceries, fresh produce, household goods, electronics
- Brands: Lucky Supermarket, Lucky Mini-market, Lucky Burger
- Website: www.luckysupermarket.com.kh

Lucky Supermarket (សុប្បត្តិភាព សុប៊ើម៉ាឃែត) is a western-style supermarket chain in Cambodia. It is one of the largest supermarket chains in the country, operating multiple branches primarily in Phnom Penh and other major cities. They mainly stock products imported from western countries, targeting expatriate communities.

== History ==
Lucky Supermarket began operations in Cambodia in March 1993, when the Lucky Market Group (LMG) opened a store on Preah Sihanouk Boulevard in Phnom Penh.

By 2012, Lucky Market Group operated 6 supermarkets and 9 fast-food outlets including Lucky Burger. In March, Dairy Farm International acquired a 70% stake in the business for US$33.2 million, forming the joint venture DFI Lucky Private Limited. The original LMG retained the remaining 30% ownership; the deal was effective 8 March 2012.

The business has grown by introducing mini-mart locations. In March 2026, DFI Lucky opened its 100th store in Tuol Pong.
