= Veth Rathana =

Cambodian actress (born 1986)

Veth Rattana
- Born: 1986 (age 39–40); Phnom Penh, People's Republic of Kampuchea (now Cambodia)
- Years active: 2003–2007

Veth Rathana (born 1986) was a Cambodian actress whose popularity rose in the mid-2000s from 2003 to 2007. She was among the most successful Cambodian actresses of the 2000s alongside Danh Monika, Keo Pich Pisey, Sim Solika, and Suos Sotheara. In 2006, she married Tuk Vandy and in 2007 Rattana fled to The United States of America with her husband. In that same year she left, the Cambodian film industry had a downfall.

== Filmography ==
| Year | Film | Role | Other notes |
|---|---|---|---|
| 2004 | 3 Ace | | Action, Drama |
| 2004 | Pume Darachan | | Action, opposite of Hum Sothanith |
| 2004 | Tep Songva | | Folktale, opposite of Eng Rithy and Sok Sophea |
| 2004 | Vinhean | | Horror |
| 2005 | Aso Oun Pong | | Romance, opposite of Eng Rithy |
| 2005 | Prasna Reatrey | | Folktale, opposite of Sok Sophea |
| 2005 | Veal Sreey Sronoss | | Folktale, opposite of Sok Sophea |
| 2005 | Vengeance | | Horror |
| 2006 | Domrei Kbal 3 Kundung Sam Pon-Three Headed Elephant | | Folktale, opposite of Eng Rithy |
| 2006 | Ok Prot Tronum | | Folktale, opposite of Sovann Makura |
| 2006 | Neang Puon | | Action, joint production with Laos |
| 2006 | Reatrei Leak | | Folktale, opposite of Heng Bunleap |
| 2006 | Snaeha Srok Srae | | Drama, opposite of Khieu Sompeth |
| 2006 | Tngai Reas Bunjras Teus | | Drama, |
| 2007 | Faith Versus Strength | | Horror |
| 2007 | Kun Chang Kun Paen | | Folktale, opposite of Sok Sophea |
| 2007 | Lbech Leu Lbech | | Comedy |
| 2007 | Neak Toss Duong Jet | | Drama |
| 2007 | Nona Komnot | | Drama |
| 2007 | Popeay Phat | | Folktale, opposite from Heng Bunleap |
