= Keo Pich Pisey =

Cambodian actress, model and dancer

- Born: 17 May 1982 (age 43); Phnom Penh, People's Republic of Kampuchea (now Cambodia)
- Modeling information
- Height: 5 ft 4 in (163 cm)
- Hair color: Brown
- Eye color: Brown

Keo Pich Pisey (Khmer: កែវ ពេជ្រពិសី, born 17 May 1982) is a Cambodian actress, model, and former dancer.

She is best known for her portrayal of San Chhay in the F4 Cambodian film series. She has also appeared in karaoke DVDs and TV commercials since 2003 and she is considered one of the top Cambodian movie stars.

Some of her films are Tokchet Ovpuk (Father’s Heart), Ath Bey, Kong Kam Kong Keo, Ros Cheat Chivith, Domnok Cheam Chong Krouy, Samoth Tok Sap, and recently Pka Thkol Sor and Sromol Krom Pnek.

She is an incarnated angel of kampuchea krom, in the true story of Pok Phak Rop, author of ‘'The stream of a true story through my karma’’ (in khmer: Kamneut Chias Chivit Thmey, 2008, Ed. Angkor Phnom Penh, Cambodia).

== Filmography ==
Year	Film	Role	Other notes
2002	Domnok Tuk Cheam Nov Kraom Tuk Pleang	Pisey	Drama
2002	Jet Mdai (A Mother's Heart)		Drama
2003	Good Husband (Pdei L'a)		Comedy
2004	3 Ace		Action, Drama
2004	Kong Kam Kong Keo		Drama, opposite of Eng Rithy
2004	Mek Nov Mean Punleu		Drama, opposite of Eng Rithy
2005	Neak Ta Kleang Meung		Folktale, opposite of Yuthara Chany
2005	Reamke	Neang Seda	Folktale, opposite of Sok Sophea
2005	Tuk Jet Ovpuk		Drama
2006	Boremei Pnhom Jruke		Folktale, opposite of Eng Rithy
2006	Mjass Vimean Atkombang		
2006	Nakor Srey Lavor		Folktale, opposite of Eng Rithy
2006	Sang Snae Knung Soben		Romance
2007	Reachany Puos		Folktale, opposite from Sok Sophea
2007	Sromoul Kraom Pneik	Pissey	Comedy
2008	Kumnum Pi Adetacheat		Romance
2008	Laéng Kum Prolung		Horror

== Television ==
Year	Film	Role	Other notes
2004	Ruos Jeat Jivit		Drama
2008	The Great of Love		Romance
2009	Pka Tkol Saw		Romance
