= Danh Monica =

Cambodian actress

- Born: 4 November 1986 (age 38); Phnom Penh, People's Republic of Kampuchea (in present-day Cambodia)
- Occupation(s): Dancer, actress
- Years active: 2001–present

Danh Monica (born 4 November 1986) is a Cambodian-born actress, dancer and entrepreneur based in Australia. Classically trained in Cambodian ballet and opera, Monica started her career as a child actor, starring in The Snake King's Child (2001). She was one of the first television soap opera stars in Cambodia.

== Early life ==
Monica's mother, Men Chennary, was a court dancer when the Khmer Rouge seized power, and later became a teacher at the dance academy.

At the age of 8, Monica started studying classical Cambodian dance and opera at the Royal Academy of Fine Arts. She and her mother sometimes performed, side by side, for King Norodom Sihanouk.

At the age of 13, Monica was cast in her debut film, The Snake King's Child. According to director Fai Sam Ang, she was chosen for the starring role for her beauty, acting skill, and calm demeanor around snakes.

== Career ==
In the 2000s, Danh Monica starred in a large number of films, including Tum Teav (2003) directed by Fai Sam Ang. Monica featured as Teav, a role which her mother had performed in stage productions throughout the 1960s.

She later moved to Australia, where she started her own international online business.

== Filmography ==
Year	Film	Role	Other notes	Ref.
2001	The Snake King's Child	Soriya	Won for best child actress	
2002	Jao Srotop Jek		Folktale	
2002	Jet Mdai (A Mother's Heart)		Modern	
2003	Tum Teav	Neang Teav	Folktale, opposite of Sok Sophea	
2003	Ah Lev			
2004	3 Ace		Modern	
2004	Ah Lev		Folktale, opposite of Sovann Makura	
2004	Athitvongsa Sisoriyavong		Folktale, opposite of Sok Sophea	
2004	Moranak Meada	Neang Moranak Meada	Folktale, opposite of Heng Bunleap	
2004	Nieng Arp	Neang Ahp	Horror, opposite of Sovann Makura	
2004	Nieng Leak	Neang Leak	Folktale	
2004	Picheyvongsa	Neang Mahouri	Folktale, opposite of Heng Bunleap	
2005	Athitvongsa Sisoriyavong		Folktale, opposite of Meng Bunlo and Heng Dary	
2005	Boremei Preah Bodima Meas		Horror	
2005	Neang Keo Nama Tida Mok Ses	Double role as Keo Nama and Moni Rattana	Folktale	
2005	Tep Tida Kondol Saw		Folktale, opposite of Eng Rithy	
2005	Vimean Chan	Neang Vimean Chan	Folktale, opposite of Heng Bunleap	
2006	Konsaeng Krohom			
2006	Pka Angkeabos	Neang Pka Angkeabos		
2006	Soriya Lngeach Tngai	Soriya	Folktale, opposite of Heng Bunleap	
2007	Preah Moha Monkoline		Folktale, opposite from Sovann Makura	
2007	Sarai Andeth	Sarai Andeth		
2007	Sompov Meas		Folktale, Actor Unknown	
2007	Srok Srae Snae Knhom		Modern, Country, opposite of Tep Rundaro	
2007	Tropeang Peay		Folktale, opposite of Heng Bunleap	
2009	Klen Pka 3 Po		Modern, TV Series	
2009	Peus Snae		Folktale, TV Series	
