= Ly Chan Siha =

Cambodian actress

Ly Chan Siha is a Cambodian actress. She starred in the movies Gratefulness (2003) and Moronak Meada (2004). She won the award for Best Actress for playing the title role in Moronak Meada.
