= Tropeang Peay =

- The Cambodian film poster
- Starring: Kong Som Eun; Vichara Dany
- Music by: Sinn Sisamouth
- Release date: 1970
- Country: Cambodia
- Language: Khmer

Tropeang Peay (Khmer: ត្រពាំងពាយ) is a 1970 Khmer film starring Kong Som Eun and Vichara Dany.

== Novel ==
The film was originally written as a novel by Ly Taly in the late 1960s before it was produced as a film in 1970.

== Remakes ==
The film was remade in 2007 by KPV Productions. The 2007 version stars Heng Bunleap and Danh Monika.

== Cast ==
- Kong Som Eun
- Vichara Dany
- Bun Chan Sophea

== Soundtrack ==
Song	Singer(s)	Notes
Tropeang Peay	Sinn Sisamouth	
Tropeang Peay	Ros Serey Sothear	
