= Ruos Cheat Jivit =

- Also known as: Taste of Life
- Genre: Medical drama, soap opera
- Created by: Matthew Robinson
- Written by: Tom Som (Head writer)
- Country of origin: Cambodia
- No. of episodes: 100

Production
- Executive producer: Matthew Robinson
- Running time: 22 minutes

Original release
- Network: Cambodian Television Network
- Release: 2004

Ruos Chea Jivit (in Khmer: រស់ជាតិជិវិត in English: Taste of Life) is a Cambodian medical drama series and soap opera.

== History ==
It was created and produced by Matthew Robinson, a former director and producer/executive producer of the BBC television series Byker Grove and EastEnders, and its production costs were met by the United Kingdom's Department for International Development as part of a £3 million plan to combat the spread of HIV/Aids and decrease infant mortality in Cambodia, a country with the highest infection rates in South-East Asia and where a third of all children were dead before their fifth birthday.

It was the first-ever Khmer production to use actual voice without dubbing. The series began a trend in Cambodian films of using actors' real voices without being dubbed.
