= Khmer Mekong Films =

Cambodian film and television company

- Industry: Motion pictures, television production
- Founded: 2006
- Headquarters: Phnom Penh, Cambodia
- Key people: Matthew Robinson (executive producer and owner); Millan Lov (head of production)
- Products: Films, television programs
- Website: www.cambodiafilms.com

Khmer Mekong Films (KMF) is a Cambodian film and television production company based in Phnom Penh, the capital city of Cambodia. Founded by Matthew Robinson, a former director and executive producer of the BBC Television series Byker Grove and EastEnders, KMF aims to help develop the Cambodian film industry, which was left moribund after the country was devastated by the Cambodian Civil War (1967–75), the Khmer Rouge regime (1975–79) and occupation by Vietnam (1979–89).

== History ==
Khmer Mekong Films grew out of the team created and trained by the BBC in 2004 to make a 100-episode TV drama about HIV for Cambodian television. Taste of Life was funded by the UK government through the Department for International Development and managed by the BBC World Service Trust. With funding finished in 2006, producer Matthew Robinson stayed in Cambodia to form KMF with the Taste of Life Khmer production team.

KMF has produced dozens of television dramas, documentaries, information films, educational films, television commercials and public service TV spots. The company has also produced nine Cambodian cinema films, Staying Single When (2007), Vanished (2009), Palace of Dreams (2010), the three-part Day in the Country (2015-2019), Price of Love (2016), King Selfie (2017), Fear (2018), Move Out (2019) and 360 Degrees (2019). A tenth movie, Dance Till You Drop, had to be abandoned halfway through shooting in March 2020 due to the dangers to cast and crew of COVID-19.

== Filmography ==
Year	Title	Release date(s) (Cambodia)
2007	Staying Single When	March 2007
2009	Vanished	September 2009
2010	Palace of Dreams	August 2010
2015-2019	Day in the Country	TBA
2016	Price of Love	April 2016
2017	King Selfie	May 2018
2018	Fear	May 2019
2019	Move Out	December 2019
2022	360 Degrees	4 August 2022

== Awards ==
In 2015/16 the first part of Day in the Country won a number of awards at four international film festivals: Hollywood International Moving Pictures Film Festival; Los Angeles International Film Festival; New York City Indie Film Awards (including 'Best Actor' and second Best Foreign Feature Film); and the Canada International Film Festival. In 2015 at the fourth Cambodian National Film Festival, Vanished won an award for 'Second Best Film' as well as 'Best Sound'. In 2016 Price of Love won four awards at the Hollywood International Moving Pictures Film Festival. In 2017 at the fifth Cambodian National Film Festival, Price of Love won four top awards including 'Best Film', 'Best Actress' and 'Best Production'.
