= Heng Tola =

Cambodian film director (born 1977)

Oknha Heng Tola
- Born: 31 October 1977 (age 48); Cambodia Battambang
- Education: Graduated From Law and Economics Science University in Phnom Penh Year 1999
- Occupations: Film director, Producer and Developer
- Years active: 2000s -
- Spouse: Lim Lyna
- Children: 1 daughter 2 sons
- Parents: Khun Heng (father); Sok Lang (mother)

Heng Tola is a Businessman, Developer, Cambodian film director and producer. He was born in 1977 in Battambang Province, Cambodia. He started to do business in year 2000. He was renovated Kirirum Cinema and operated on 22 December 2002. Because of the problem between Khmer anti Thai in 2003 cinema can't screen Thai Fim that force him to produce Khmer movies. He started to produce Khmer films in 2003 production name CamPro Production Co., Ltd. He has produced 15 titles include Gratefulness 2003, Neang Neath 2004, The Forest 2005, The Haunted House 2005, Motherless 2005, Villa Horror 2005, Ghost of Banana Tree 2005, 24 Hours Horror 2006, The Wall Of Love 2006, Mr. Mao 2006, The Game 2006, The Painter 2006, Neang Khiev 2006, Klach Ei Nhom 2006, The Mother 2017.

In 2007 till now he started in real estate business and developer he operated the Gas Station, Hotel, Cinema, Golf Course, Boxing Arena, Fitness Center, Night Market, Restaurant and Housing Project in his hometown Battambang Province.

== Background ==
Tola founded the film production company CamPro Production in 2003. He was also the managing director of Kirirom Cinema which was located on Sihanouk Boulevard. He is the president of RSB Ek Phnom Cinema which is located at Borey Raksmey, Battambang Province. operated in December 2017 till now and in 2024 he is built one more cinema is RSB Phnom Sampov Cinema that is going to open in December 2024.

== Career ==
His film Gratefulness which starred Ly Chan Siha was an award winning film. His film Ghost Banana Tree, released in 2004 was the fourth Campro production film. The 2005 horror film, The Forest received several award nominations at the Khmer National Film Festival. It managed to pick up the Best Special Effects award. Also that year, Pteah khmaoch tinh aka The Haunted House was released, starring Chan Nary, Prak Sambath and Huy Yaleng.

Tola has commented on the fluctuation of the Cambodian film industry, and how they could make it last.
