= The Snake King's Child =

2001 Cambodian-Thai horror film by Fai Sam Ang

The Snake King's Child (កូនពស់កេងកង)
- Cambodian film poster.
- Directed by: Fai Sam Ang
- Written by: Fai Sam Ang; Mao Samnang
- Produced by: Thunya Nilklang
- Starring: Winai Kraibutr; Pich Chanbormey; Ampor Tevi; Tep Rindaro
- Cinematography: Saray Chan
- Distributed by: Siam Film Development; Studio Bangkok
- Release dates: February 2001 (Cambodia); March 2001 (Thailand)
- Running time: 108 min
- Countries: Cambodia; Thailand
- Language: Khmer

The Snake King's Child (Khmer: កូនពស់កេងកង, Koun Puoh Kengkang, also known as Snaker and Ghost Wife 2) is a 2001 Cambodian-Thai horror film directed by Fai Sam Ang, based on a Cambodian myth about the half-human daughter of a snake god. It was produced as a sequel to the 1970 movie The Snake King's Wife. It is the first full-length feature film for cinema to be produced in Cambodia since before the Khmer Rouge era. The special effect of the lead character's head being full of writhing snakes was achieved by gluing live snakes to a cap worn by the actress.

== Plot ==
Neang Nhi (Ampor Tevi), a woman neglected by her abusive husband, Manop, is working in the fields one day when she accidentally loses her hoe in some shrubbery and encounters a giant python. The snake speaks to Nhi, and says he will return her hoe if she agrees to have sex with him. That night, the snake transforms into a man (Tep Rindaro), brings back the hoe, and has sex with Nhi, a union that results in Nhi's pregnancy.

Manop eventually finds out that it was the python who impregnated his wife, so he beheads the python and then stabs his wife in the stomach. Nhi is killed by the blow, but dozens of small snakes pour out of her abdomen and into a nearby stream. Manop chases after the baby snakes, killing each one, but slips on a rock and is killed.

A surviving baby snake transforms into a human infant, who is then found by a wandering monk. The monk names the baby girl Soraya and raises her. She grows into a beautiful teenage woman (Pich Chanbormey), but has living serpents instead of hair. The monk, however, is able to fashion a magical ring that allows her to keep the snakes at bay and appear to have normal hair.

One day, Soraya is bathing at a waterfall when she encounters a young man, Wae-ha (Winai Kraibutr), who has fallen into the pool after a fight with another man over a woman. Wae-ha is nursed back to health and he and Soraya fall in love. Wae-ha then takes Soraya back to his home to meet his family. One of Wae-ha's friends attempts to rape Soraya, during which her ring comes off and the snakes appear in her hair and bite the man, killing him with their venom.

It is further revealed that if Soraya's virginity is broken, she will permanently turn into a snake.

== Cast ==
- Winai Kraibutr as Wae-ha
- Pich Chanbormey as Soraya
- Tep Rindaro as Snake god
- Ampor Tevi as Nhi

== Origins ==
The Snake King's Child is a popular myth in Cambodia and has been depicted on film many times, one of the most famous being a 1960s version, Pos Keng Kang (Snake Woman) that starred Dy Saveth. In 2000, Cambodian director Fai Sam Ang decided it was time to try to make the first feature-length film for cinema in Cambodia since before the Khmer Rouge era, and he chose the oft-told tale in hopes that it would be a commercial success. The film was made as a co-production with investors from Thailand, and featured Thai leading man Winai Kraibutr, veteran Cambodian soap opera actress Ampor Tevi and 17-year-old debut Cambodian actress Pich Chanbormey.

== Special effects ==
No digital effects are used in the film, as they could not be afforded by the production. To achieve the effect of Soraya's head full of writhing snakes, live snakes were glued to a cap worn by actress Pich Chanboramey.

"Sometimes the snakes would leap off her head, and we'd have to chase them around the set," director Fai Sam Ang said in an interview. He also said he had trouble convincing the actress to wear the cap. "When she first saw the snakes, she cried and cried," Fai Sam Ang said. "But I told her she had to be professional. In the end, it was no problem. The snakes would just give her little kisses on the cheek."

For another scene, a 4.5-meter python borrowed from a Buddhist temple was placed on top of actress Ampor Tevi to depict her character's sex scene with the snake king.

== Release ==
At the time of the film's release, war-ravaged Cambodia did not yet have any commercial cinemas suitable to premiere the film, so it was screened at the French Cultural Center and outdoors in the courtyard of a local television station in Phnom Penh. The film also opened in wide release in Thai cinemas.

Due to Winai Kraibutr's presence in the cast, the film was marketed in Hong Kong and other Asian markets as Ghost Wife 2 in an attempt to cash in on the popularity of the 1999 Thai ghost film Nang Nak (Ghost Wife), which Winai had starred in.

== Sequel ==
In 2006, Fai Sam Ang directed sequel called The Snake King's Grandchild (Khmer: រឿងចៅពស់កេងកង, Chaos Puos Keng Kang, also Snaker 2 and Snake's love), which continues the story of Wae-ha and Soriya.
