= The Haunted House (2005 film) =

- Khmer poster
- Directed by: Heng Tola
- Written by: Mao Samnang
- Produced by: Huy Yaleng
- Starring: Huy Yaleng; Chan Nary; Prak Sambath
- Distributed by: Campro Production
- Release date: May 20, 2005
- Running time: 120 minutes
- Country: Cambodia
- Language: Khmer

The Haunted House (Cambodian title: Pteah khmaoch tinh, Khmer: ផ្ទះខ្មោចទិញ), released in the United States as House of Haunted, is a 2005 Khmer horror film that was directed by Heng Tola and is the fifth film produced by Campro Production. The movie is based on an urban legend in Kampong Chhnang purporting that a large deserted home found along Nation Road #5 was haunted. It stars Huy Yaleng, Chan Nary and Prak Sambath.

== Plot ==
In 1993 a couple purchases a new home in the Kampong Chhnang Province with the intent to live there and eventually sell the home for a profit. Soon after they move in, the pair dream that an old man offered them gold in exchange for the purchase of their house and the next morning the find the gold waiting for them. They keep the gold but remain in the home until one morning they wake up and are horrified to find that themselves in the field beside the home. The couple flees the house and go to live with relatives, but this did not satisfy the spirits residing in the home. Bad things continue to happen, not only to anyone who stays in the home but also to anyone who chooses not to believe that it is haunted. Eventually the villagers grow so terrified that they hire a ghostbuster, who persuades the ghosts to stop haunting people in exchange for arranging for people to stop coming to the house. The village becomes quiet and happy again and the abandoned house became part of the local mythology, which endures into the present day.
