= Nang Nak =

Thai horror film (1999)

- Theatrical release poster
- Directed by: Nonzee Nimibutr
- Written by: Wisit Sasanatieng
- Produced by: Visute Poolvoralaks
- Starring: Intira Charoenpura; Winai Kraibutr
- Cinematography: Nattawut Kittikhun
- Edited by: Sunij Asavinikul
- Music by: Chartchai Pongprapapan; Pakkawat Vaiyavit
- Distributed by: Tai Entertainment
- Release date: 23 July 1999
- Running time: 100 minutes
- Country: Thailand
- Language: Thai

Nang Nak (Thai: นางนาก) is a 1999 Thai supernatural horror film based on the Thai legend of Mae Nak Phra Khanong. It was directed by Nonzee Nimibutr and released in 1999 by Buddy Film and Video Production Co. in Thailand. It depicts the life of a devoted ghost wife and her unsuspecting husband.

== Plot ==
In a rural village east of Bangkok, Mak (Winai Kraibutr) is conscripted and sent to fight in the Siamese-Vietnamese War (1831–1834). He has to leave behind his pregnant teenage wife, Nak (Intira Charoenpura). Mak is wounded and barely survives. He eventually returns home to his beloved wife and their child.

A friend visits and sees Mak living with Nak. The villagers, knowing she had died months earlier, realize Mak is spellbound by her ghost. But those who attempt to tell him are killed in the night by Nak's ghost, who is desperate to stay with her husband. When Mak confronts Nak about the rumours, she lies and says the villagers disliked her after he left for the war. She claims they are also telling lies about their son not being Mak's. Mak believes her and lashes out at anyone who tells him she is dead.

Mak eventually discovers the truth. Crawling under their house one night to retrieve an item, he trips on something sticking up from the dirt. Curious, he digs it up and finds a corpse making him wonder why Nak would always prevent him from going down there. Looking up through the creaks of the wood floor, he sees Nak sitting and brushing her hair. Dropping the comb through a crack, her arm eerily extends all the way to the ground to retrieve it. Mak covers his mouth to stifle a scream and continues observing Nak. Nak picks up her crying baby, who Mak realises is a corpse as well. A series of flashbacks reveal that Nak had a difficult childbirth and both mother and child died from complications. Mak flees in terror to the local temple to hide. Nak follows him and attempts to win him back, but he is too frightened of her. The villagers attempt to drive out Nak, burning down her house and at last summoning an exorcist. Nak refuses to leave unless Mak returns to her. Mak pleads with her to leave to the netherworld. He loves her, but they can't be together since she is dead. He tells her that he is going to cut his hair and become a monk in order to pray for her sins and allow her spirit to find peace. She still refuses.

The kingdom's most respected Buddhist monk, Somdej Toh, intervenes and, in a tearful farewell, Nak repents, leaving her husband for this life. The monk has the centre of her corpse's forehead cut out, thus releasing her spirit, and makes a girdle brooch of it. The epilogue states it later came into the possession of Prince Chumbhorn Ketudomsak. It was thereafter handed down for generations, with its current owner unknown.

== Cast ==
- Intira Charoenpura as Nak
- Winai Kraibutr as Mak

== Background ==
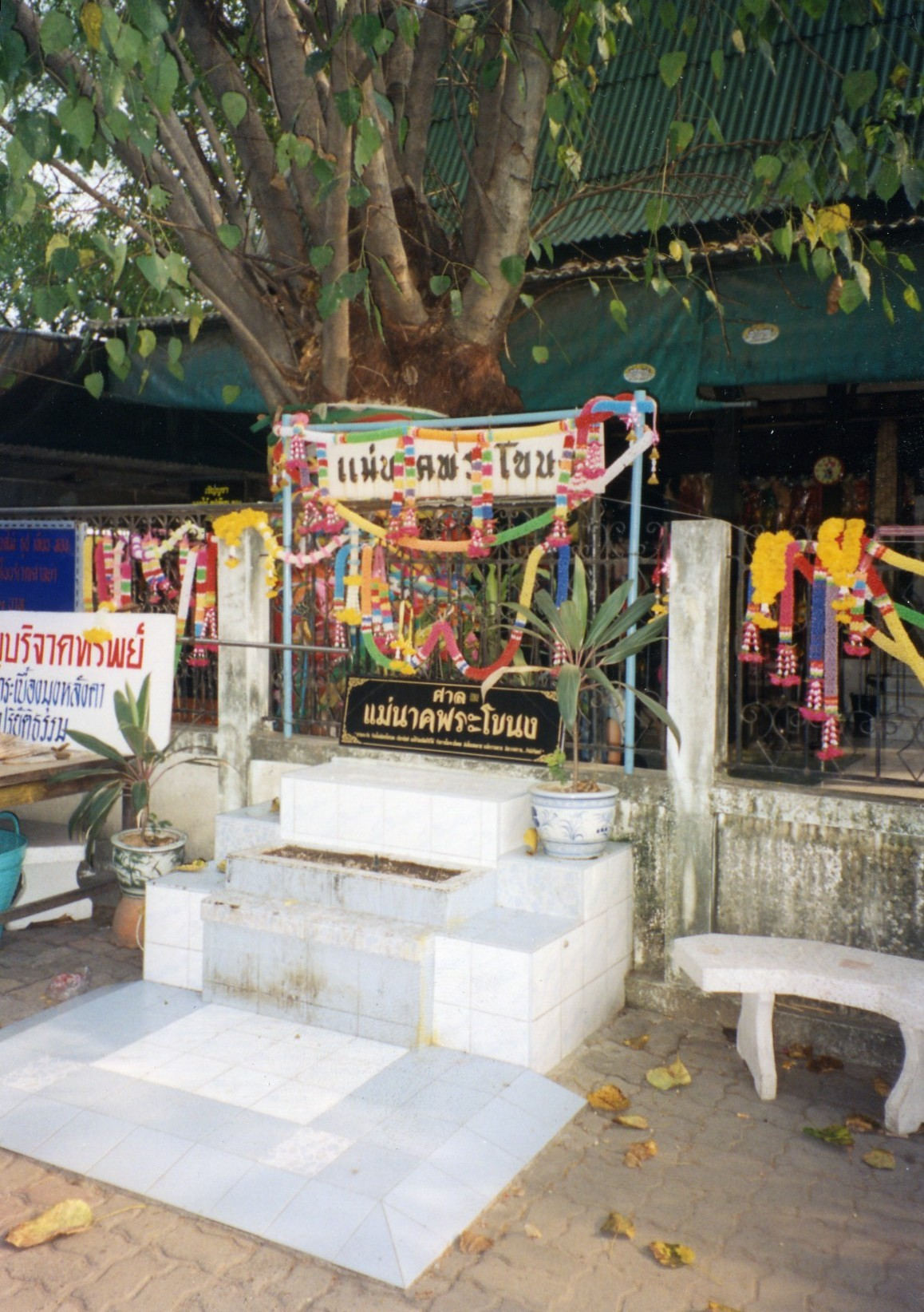
Shrine to Mae Nak at Wat Mahabut, Sukhumvit Soi 77, Suan Luang District, Bangkok

The allegedly true story of Mae Nak Phra Khanong is Thailand's most popular ghost tale. A popular shrine dedicated to her at is at On Nut, Sukhumvit Soi 77 in Bangkok's Suan Luang (formerly Phra Khanong) District.

The old tale has been depicted on film many times since the silent era, one of the most famous being Mae Nak Pra Kanong in 1958. British filmmaker Mark Duffeld directed a version in 2005 called Ghost of Mae Nak. There also is an opera, Mae Nak, by Thai composer Somtow Sucharitkul.

Another retelling of the Nak legend is Pee Mak Phrakanong (2013), a film directed by Banjong Pisanthanakun, which relates the story from the husband's viewpoint. The film surpassed one billion baht in box office revenue, Thailand's highest grossing film to date.

== Release ==
The film opened in cinemas on 23 July 1999. It was wildly popular and became the first Thai film to earn 100 million baht at the box office. In an era of 100 baht cinema tickets it would go on to earn more than 150 million baht. In 2019, on the 20th anniversary of its original release, it was re-released in digital format to select cinemas.

== See also ==
- List of ghost films
