= Matthew Robinson (producer) =

British and Cambodian producer and director (born 1944)

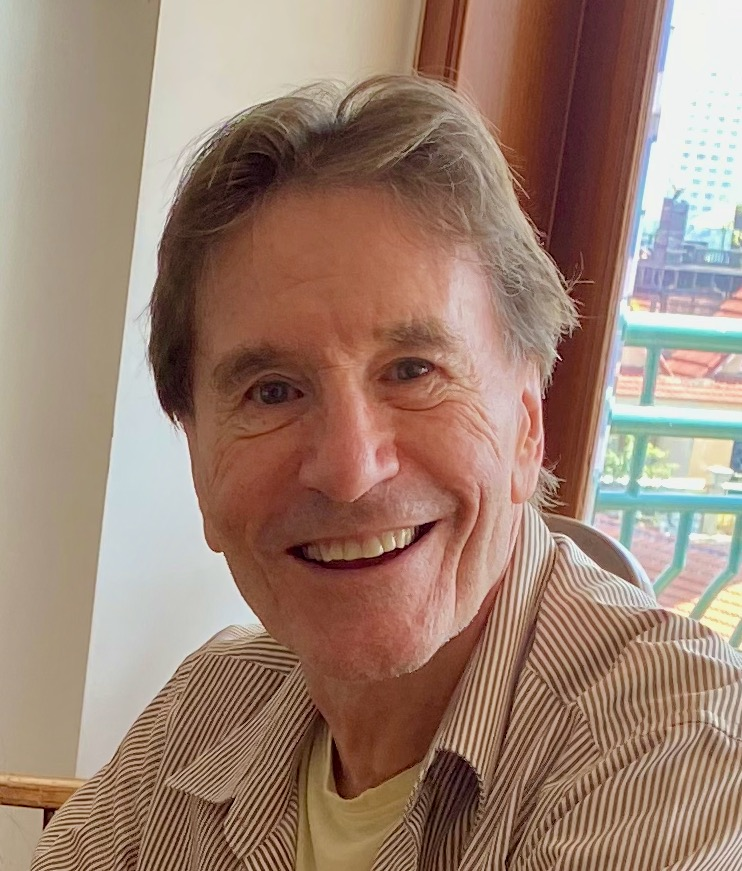
- Robinson in 2020
- Born: 27 July 1944 (age 82); London, England
- Citizenship: Cambodian (since 2020)
- Education: King's College, Cambridge
- Occupations: Television and film producer, director, writer
- Years active: 1966–present
- Television: The Money Programme; 24 Hours; Nationwide; Play for Today; Second City Firsts; Bergerac; Howards' Way; Shadow of the Noose; Doctor Who; Coronation Street; EastEnders; Byker Grove
- Relatives: Tom Robinson (brother)

Matthew Robinson (born 27 July 1944) is a British and Cambodian television and film executive producer, producer, director and writer. After graduating from the University of Cambridge, he directed many episodes of popular British television dramas and soap operas in the 1970s and 1980s. He became the first producer (and later became the executive producer) of the series Byker Grove (1989–1997), and was also made the executive producer of EastEnders (1998–2000).

Robinson finished his British television career as the Head of Drama for BBC Wales. Since 2003, he has been based in Cambodia, where he runs his own production company, Khmer Mekong Films.

== Early life ==
Robinson was educated at Huntingdon Grammar School (1955–58), Friends' School in Saffron Walden (1958–63) and King's College, Cambridge (1963–66), where he studied economics, edited student newspaper Varsity and graduated with a master's degree.

== Career ==
=== Early work ===
Robinson's first job in television was as a researcher on the weekly consumer affairs programme On the Braden Beat made by ATV in 1966. He started directing in BBC Current Affairs (1969–73) on The Money Programme, 24 Hours and Nationwide. This was followed by many episodes of popular TV drama including Softly, Softly: Task Force, Play for Today, Z-Cars, Emmerdale, Crown Court, Coronation Street, Angels, Brookside, Howard's Way and Bergerac. Robinson had a "reputation as an action director", and was employed to direct two Doctor Who adventures, Resurrection of the Daleks (1984) and Attack of the Cybermen (1985). He was also responsible for casting Terry Molloy as Davros, who went on to play the role twice more on television and in further audio dramas.

=== EastEnders ===
Producer Julia Smith, who had worked with Robinson on Angels, employed him to be lead director of BBC1's soap opera EastEnders when it launched in 1985. Having previously worked with Leslie Grantham in the theatre in a play written by Robinson, as well as casting him in a guest role in Doctor Who, Robinson recommended him for the role of Den Watts in EastEnders.

=== Byker Grove ===
From 1989 to 1997 Robinson produced and part-directed the BBC's teenage drama series Byker Grove. His casting included Ant McPartlin and Declan Donnelly, who made their names on the series. Robinson told them to "stay together through any row you have, whatever it is, be together and you could be the future Morecambe and Wise. I think they have proved that in many ways." According to the BBC, Byker Grove tackled "many controversial issues" including a gay storyline which led The Sun to call for Robinson to be sacked at the time.

=== Return to EastEnders ===
Between 1998 and 2000 Robinson served as executive producer of EastEnders, during which time it won the BAFTA for "Best Soap Opera" in 1999 and 2000.

=== BBC Wales and move to Cambodia ===
Robinson left EastEnders to become Head of Drama at BBC Wales. In 2003, while in that position, he responded to an advertisement in the BBC newspaper for the position of executive producer of a HIV/AIDS drama in Cambodia, which became Ruos Cheat Jivit. He subsequently stayed in Cambodia and set up the film and television production company Khmer Mekong Films.

== Personal life ==
Robinson is the older brother of singer-songwriter, bassist, radio presenter and long-time LGBT rights activist Tom Robinson.

In 2020 Robinson received Cambodian citizenship from Prime Minister Samdech Hun Sen following support from the Minister of Culture and Fine Arts.

Media offices
Preceded by Mike Hudson	Executive Producer of EastEnders; 1 June 1998 – 13 April 2000	Succeeded by John Yorke
Preceded by Pedr James	BBC Wales Head of Drama; 2000–3	Succeeded by Julie Gardner
