= List of Cambodian films of the 1990s =

This is an incomplete, chronological list of films produced in the Khmer language between 1990 and 1999.

At least 15 years of film producing were lost in Cambodia due to the Khmer Rouge. At that time, Khmer people in Cambodia preferred Thai dubbed series over watching Khmer movies, but the Khmer people out of the country only watched Khmer movies to remind them of their country.

Title	Director	Actors	Genre	Notes
1990
BetPhnek HekTroung	Yous Bovannak and Ampor Tevi		Romance Film	Director's film, Hoy Poth
Ark Kambang Kech Sanyar (The Secret Promise)	Ses Vong Setha	Tep Rundaro and Ampor Tevi	Suspense/Romance	
Besdong Komloss Somross Duong Jet Kromom		Tep Rundaro and Ampor Tevi	Romance	
Cinéma de notre temps: Souleymane Cissé	Rithy Panh			
Chneah Jet Janh Snae	Pov Pomngea		Romance	Hang Meas Production
Kavei Psong Snae		Som Dara, Sovann Mony, and Sok Sreymom	Romance	
Mek Mee Srotum		Ket Somborith and Jandara Thy	Drama	CM Production
Nis Reu Jivit		Ja Rithy, Suoh Sokunthea	Drama	CM Production
Oh Love			Romance	
Oh My Love		Tep Rundaro	Romance	
Ossja Nass Ov		Neay Kuy	Comedy	Preah Vihear Production
Pisout Snae		Pich Phirun	Romance	Mokott Pich Production
Pjous Kam Lokei		Kai Prasith	Drama	CM Production
Pleung Snae Peakdei		Kai Prasith, Jandara Thy, Keo Koliyan	Romance	Mokott Pich Production
Prenneary Asorss Leak	Yous Bovannak and Oum Sovanny		Romantic drama	
Snae Muoy		Sovann Mony and Sok Sreymom	Romance	
Ta Kon Mae-Grandpa Is Mother's Son			Comedy	
Tngai Na Oun Vil Vinh		Yuthara Chany, Sok Sreymom	Drama	Preah Vihear Production
Tuk Ho Min Trolop		Neay Krum and Oum Sovanny	Romance	
1991
Bong'am Cheevit-Sweetened Life			Romance	Preah Vihea Production
Bopha Prei Phnom		Sok Sreymom and Yuthara Chany	Romance	
Cambodia: Between War and Peace	Rithy Panh			
Chueng Maek Dach Sroyal	Mao Ayuth	Ampor Tevi and Tep Rundaro	Romance	Angkorwat Production
Entinou 3 Por (Three Colored Dragon)		Yuthara Chany and Jandara Thy	Romance	
Jung Srol	Mao Ayuth	Ampor Tevi and Tep Rondaro	Romance	Angkorwat Production
Mae Ombao Kleng Kai		Kai Prasith, Jandara Tee, and Ampor Tevi	Drama	
Mae Ondeuk Chmol Nhee		Aek Omrah, Som Dara, Kai Prasith, and Hok Leakenna	Drama	
1992
1 Kompleang Anuksavary	Kung Veasna	Tep Rundaro and Ampor Tevi	Romance	Angkorwat Production
The Champa Flower
Cheveth Moy Somnang Pi	Yous Bovannak and Ampor Tevi		Drama film	
Jam Bong Komlos Sen (Wait Until I'm a Guy)		Tep Rundaro, Ampor Tevi	Comedy	
Kahek Sor Kleng Khao	Yous Bovannak and Keo Kolyan		Drama film	
Mek Srolas....		Yous Bovannak, Tep Rundaro, Sok Srey Mom, Phorm Phuong Bopha	Drama	
Kbot Nung Veasna		Kai Prasith, Jandara Thy, and Sok Sreymom	Drama	
Kdam Srae		Ampor Tevi, Tep Rundaro, Kai Prasith, and Sok Sreymom	Romance	Angkor Production
Kone Ondauk Meas		Kai Prasith and Sok Sreymom	Romance	
Kromom Khlaeng Kai		Ampor Tevi and Kai Prasith	Romance	
My Village at Sunset	Norodom Sihanouk	San Chariya and Roland Eng		
Neak Ta Kleung Meung		Aek Amra	Legendary	
The Path Separates Into Three		Ampor Tevi, Neary Rothkunthea, and Kai Prasith	Romance	
Pich Min Tonn Chnai	Mao Ayuth	Tep Rundaro, Pisith Pilika, and Ampor Tevi	Comedy	Preah Vihea Production
Prenn Prai Domrai Dench	Yous Bovannak and Keo kolyan		Comedy film	
Sahk Meul Sen (Let Me Try You)	Meng Sarun	Tep Rundaro and Ampor Tevi	Modern, Comedy	Angkorwat Production #8
Somdei Jong Krouy	Mao Ayuth	Ampor Tevi and Tep Rundaro	Romance	Angkorwat Production #47
Som Heuy Loke Pdey (That's Right My Husband)	Mao Ayuth	Ampor Tevi and Tep Rundaro	Comedy	Preah Vihea Production
1993
Beisach Kromom		Pisith Pilika and Som Dara	Folktale	Remake
Chnam Oun 16	Fai Som Ang	Prum Sovuthy, Arun Reksmey, Pich Pirun, and Ampor Tevi	Musical	Angkorwat Production Musical #8
Duong Jet Kmouch		Kai Prasith and Sok Sreymom	Suspense, Comedy	
Jan Greoufah	Fai Som Ang	Tep Rundaro and Hok Leakenna	Musical	Angkorwat Production Musical #5
Jrolom Knhom Heuy	Mao Ayuth	Sok Sreymom, Hok leakenna, Mae Meun, and Tep Rundaro	Modern, Comedy	Angkorwat Production #10
Kakei		Pich Pirun, Sovann Mony, Tep Rundaro, and Ampor Tevi	Musical	Angkorwat Production Musical #9
Kat Besdong Daumbei Bong		Tep Rundaro, Aek Amra and Ampor Tevi	Romance	
Kmouch Beisach Nei Propun Jea Tee Snaeha Robos Knhom		Pich Phirun, Sok Sreymom, Pisith Pilika, Ampor Tevi, Tep Rundaro, Yuthara Chany, Keo Koliyan, Hok Leakenna, Kong Sophy	Romance	
Kromum Leak Kluon		Som Dara and Ampor Tevi	Romance	Som Dara and Ampor Tevi together for the 1st time in film history
Moronak Meada	Fai Som Ang	Pisith Pilika	Musical	Angkorwat Production Musical #7
My Mother's Still a Virgin		Sok Sreymom, Mae Meun, and Tep Rundaro	Modern, Comedy	Angkorwat Production #25
Neang Badaja		Pisith Pilika	Musical	
Preah Vesandor	Fai Som Ang	Tep Rundaro and Pisith Pilika	Folktale, Musical	
Sarika Somlaeng Meah		Sok Sreymom and Yuoh Bovannak	Romance	Preah Vihear Production #?
Sman Ta Kron (You Think You're All That or What?)		Tep Rundaro, Ampor Tevi, Yuos Bovannak, and Keo Kolyan	Romance, Comedy	Preah Vihear Production #?
See Angkor and Die	King Norodom Sihanouk	San Chariya, Roland Eng	Romantic drama	
Teav Aek		Pisith Pilika and Hok Leakenna	Folktale	Angkorwat Production #17
Tuk Pneik Haek Trung		Ampor Tevi	Drama	Reasmei Kampuchea Production
1994
Bopha Puos Vaek	Kong Buncheun	Tep Rundaro, Pisith Pilika, and Sok Sreymom	Legendary	
Bromat Bromong	Parn Puong Bopha	Tep Rundaro, Pisith Pilika, and Sok Sreymom	Folktale, Horror	Reachasei Meas Production
Kach Nas Kul Nas		Tep Rundaro, and Ampor Tevi	Romance	
Kon Jrok Vetamun	Kong Buncheun	Yuthara Chanee, Tep Rundaro, and Sok Sreymom	Folktale, Horror	
Muoy Sapada Nei Peisakakam Kmouch	Mao Ayuth	Som Dara, Kai Prosith, and Sok Sreymom	Suspense, Comedy	Angkorwat Production #29
Ondaht Doh Cha'ung	Mao Ayuth	Kai Prosith and Keo Kolyan, Tep Rundaro, Ampor Tevi	Drama	Angkorwat Production #26
Peasants in Distress	King Norodom Sihanouk	Yuhtara Chanee, Tep Rundaro, Keo Kolyan, Kai Prosith		
Pov Malis Lea		Arun Reksmey and Sok Sreymom	Folktale	USA Production
Preah Leak Sinavong Neang Pream Kesor		Hong Polee Maktura, Pich Saparn, and Oun Sakga	Folktale	Angkorwat Production #5?
Rice People	Rithy Panh	Peng Phan, Mom Soth, and Chhim Naline		Entered into the 1994 Cannes Film Festival
Somlaeng Tror Khmer	Puon Puong Bopha	Hum Chora and Pisith Pilika	Drama	
Tan Teang Bey		Kai Prosith and Keo Kolyan	Romance	Preah Vihea Production #
1995
An Ambition Reduced to Ashes	King Norodom Sihanouk	Keo Kosal, Neary Roth Kunthea, and Mom Soth		Short feature film
Pka Onkeabos		Tep Rundaro and Pisth Pilika	Folktale	Angkorwat Production #4?
Preah Moha Monkoline		Tep Rundaro and Keo Kolyan	Folktale	Remake
The Last Days of Colonel Savath	King Norodom Sihanouk	Kong Sophy, Mom Soth, Chorn Torn		Short film
The Tan Family	Rithy Panh		Documentary	
1996
Bophana: A Cambodian Tragedy	Rithy Panh			
Picheyvongsa		Hong Polee Maktura and Pisith Pilika	Musical	Angkorwat Production, 2 parts, #92 and #93
Prolung Areak Ontheak Neesai	Choum Tull	Tep Rundaro, Keo Kolyan, Yuthara Chanee, and Sok Sreymom	Folktale	
1997
10 Films Against 110 Million Mines	Rithy Panh			
An Apostle of Non-Violence	King Norodom Sihanouk	Khai Prasith, Saroeun Sophirom		Short feature film
Bopha Pailin		Hum Sotanitt and Chan Leakenna		Khmer series from the late 90s
Cheat Satrey	Fey Som Ang	Pich Saparn, Keo Kolyan, Pan Sopanny	Modern	The 1st complete Khmer series. Pich Saparn last film.
Len Toung Koma			Musical	The last Cambodian musical film released by Angkorwat Production as film # 97
1998
BBB (Croatia at the Crossroads)				
One Evening After the War	Rithy Panh	Chea Lyda Chan		
Van Chan, a Cambodian Dancer	Rithy Panh			
1999
Mine Village		Molika	Romance	

== See also ==
- List of Khmer entertainment companies
- List of Khmer film actors
- List of Khmer film directors
