= Yim Guechse =

Cambodian poet and author

Yim Guechse (Khmer: យឹម កិច្ចសែ; born November 20, 1946, in Phnom Penh) is a Cambodian poet and author, who lives in Germany.

== Life and work ==
Guechse Yim went in 1971 to the GDR and studied at the Karl-Marx-Universität in Leipzig in linguistics. In 1976 he went to West-Berlin and studied library science at the FU Berlin until 1981.

Guechse Yim writes in Khmer. Only a few of his poems were translated into the German, French and Spanish languages. In his works, he treats the corporal love, as well as social problems in Cambodia with many references to the khmer-tradition. In 1970 he published the novel "Ramayana in the dramas", followed by a collection of poems "A decade of dreams". In 1986 his social-critical novel "Good by, rose of Phnom Penh" was published, along with two new collections of poems "Life against the stream" and "Creep among the life". 1988 also saw the publication of his novel "Kolab, the cambodiana", and in 1990 another novel "Shared life". Guechse Yim is engaged in the Studiengemeinschaft Kambodschanische Kultur e. V.. Between 1986 and 2003 he was co-editor of the magazine „Kambodschanische Kultur“, for which he wrote some articles.

== See also ==
- Chuth Khay
- Hak Chhay Hok
- Keng Vannsak
- Khun Srun
- Kong Bunchhoeun
- Soth Polin
- Vandy Kaonn
