= Norodom Sihanouk filmography =

Norodom Sihanouk was the King of Cambodia who reigned between 1941 and 1955 and again from 1993 to 2004. Sihanouk was also known as a filmmaker. He often simultaneously produced, directed and wrote the scripts of his films. He also acted in a few of his own films, and produced a total of 50 films throughout his lifetime.

== Filmography ==
| English title | Other title/Original title | Year | Role | Notes | Ref. |
|---|---|---|---|---|---|
| Tarzan Among the Kuoy | | 1940s | Producer, director, scriptwriter | | |
| Double Crime on the Maginot Line | Double Crime sur la Ligne Maginot | 1940s | Producer, director, scriptwriter | | |
| Apsara | អប្សរា | 1966 | Producer and director | First feature film | |
| The Enchanted Forest | La forêt enchantée | 1966-7 | Producer, director, scriptwriter, actor | | |
| The Little Prince | ព្រះប្រជាកុមារ | 1967 | Producer, director, scriptwriter | Won the Golden Apsara Award at the 1968 Phnom Penh International Film Festival | |
| Shadows Over Angkor | Ombre sur Angkor | 1968 | Producer, director, scriptwriter, actor | | |
| The Joy of Life | La Joie de Vivre | 1968 | Producer, director, scriptwriter | | |
| Twilight | Crépuscule | 1969 | Producer, director, scriptwriter, actor | Won the Golden Apsara Award at the 1969 Phnom Penh International Film Festival | |
| Tragic Destiny | Tragique destin | 1969 | Producer, director, scriptwriter | | |
| Rose of Bokor | Rose de Bokor | 1969 | Producer, director, scriptwriter, actor, music | | |
| The Mysterious City | La cité mystérieuse | 1988 | Director, scriptwriter | Filmed in North Korea | |
| Goodbye, My Love | Adieu mon amour | 1988 | Director, scriptwriter | Filmed in North Korea | |
| The Countess of Norkorom | La comtesse de Nokorom | 1989 | Director, scriptwriter | Filmed in North Korea | |
| I Shall Never See You Again, Oh My Beloved Kampuchea! | Je ne te reverrai plus, ô mon bien-aimé Kampuchea! | 1990 | Director, scriptwriter | Filmed in North Korea | |
| The Beacon That Lights Our Way | Le phare qui éclaire notre voie | 1991 | Director, scriptwriter | | |
| My Village at Sunset | Mon village au coucher du soleil | 1992 | Producer, director, scriptwriter | Winner of the Prix Special at the Saint Petersburg Festival | |
| The Champa Flower of Battambang | La fleur Champa de Battambang | 1992 | Producer, director, scriptwriter | | |
| The Phantom of My Beloved Wife | Le fantôme de ma femme bien-aimée | 1993 | Producer, director, scriptwriter | | |
| A Croesus Saviour of Poor Women | Un Cresus sauveteur de femmes pauvres | 1993 | Producer, director, scriptwriter | | |
| The Four Elements | Les quatres éléments | 1993 | Director | Ballet film | |
| See Angkor and Die | Revoir Angkor et mourir | 1993 | Producer, director, scriptwriter | | |
| Fatality | Fatalité | 1994 | Producer, director, scriptwriter | | |
| Peasants in Distress | Un paysan et une paysanne en détresse | 1994 | Producer, director, scriptwriter | | |
| Khmer Robin Hood | Robin des Bois Khmer | 1994 | Producer, director, scriptwriter | | |
| Nostalgia for China | Nostalgie de la Chine | 1995 | Producer, director, scriptwriter | | |
| An Ambition Reduced to Ashes | Une ambition réduite en cendres | 1995 | Producer, director, scriptwriter | | |
| Buddha, Dharma, Sangha, the Sole Refuge | Bouddha, Dharma, Sangha le seul refuge | 1995 | Producer, director, scriptwriter | | |
| The Last Days of Colonel Savath | Les derniers jours du Colonel Savath | 1995 | Producer, director, scriptwriter | | |
| An Apostle of Non-Violence | Un apôtre de la non-violence | 1997 | Director, scriptwriter | | |
| Commander of the Royal Order of Koh Daung | | 2006 | Producer, director | | |
| Four Wives Are Not Such Fun | | 2006 | Producer, director | | |
| Who Doesn't Have a Mistress | | 2006 | Producer, director | | |
| Miss Asina | | 2006 | Producer | Final film | |

== Documentaries ==
- Cambodge 1965 (1965)
- Cortège Royal (1969)
- Norodom Sihanouk, Roi Cinéaste (1997), directed by Jean-Baptiste Martin
- The Curious History of Cambodia's Beloved Kings (2021)

== Bibliography ==
- Chandler, David P. (1991). The Tragedy of Cambodian History: Politics, War and Revolutions since 1945. United States of America: Yale University Press. ISBN 0300057520.
- Osborne, Milton E (1994). Sihanouk Prince of Light, Prince of Darkness. Honolulu, Hawaii, United States of America: University of Hawaii Press. ISBN 978-0-8248-1639-1.
- Jarvis, Helen (1997). Cambodia. University of Michigan, United States of America: CLIO Press. ISBN 1851091777.
