= List of Cambodian films of the 1980s =

This is an incomplete, chronological list of films produced in the Khmer language between 1980 and 1989.

At least 15 years of film producing were lost in Cambodia due to the Khmer Rouge. At this time, Khmer people in Cambodia preferred Thai dubbed series than watching Khmer movies, but Khmer people out of the country only watched Khmer movies then to remind them of their country.

== Cambodian films of the 1980s ==
Title	Director	Actors	Genre	Notes
1980
Kuon Euy Madai Ahp		Jandara Tee	Horror	Successful horror film after the Khmer Rouge
1984
Chet Chong Cham (I Want To Remember)	Mao Ayuth	Kai Prosith	Drama	Angkorwat Production
1985
Naruok 9 Jon (9 Levels of Hell)			Horror	
1986
Roloke Snae			Romance	
1987
Secret Tears in the Quiet Purple Night		Tep Rundaro	Romance	Tep Rundaro 1st film
Tngai Na			Romance	Sayonara Production
1988
Cheam Prolak Keo Pneik	Sem Sovandeth	Ket Somborith and Oum Sovanny	Drama	CM Production
Kraop Tae Klen		Jandarathy	Drama	Preah Vihear Production
Sne Hiek Chiek Vihnean		Sam Vityea and Ampor Tevi	Romance	Ampor Tevi 1st film
1989
Ah Sach June Mdai		Ket Somborith, Kai Prasith, Oum Sovanny	Drama	Mokott Pich Production
Cheam Muoy Domnok			Drama	Kompong Saom Production
Jumno Snae Kbae Mochareach		Oum Sovanny	Romance	
Knanh Knanh	Nop Sombath	Som Dara and Neary Roth Kunthea	Romance	Mokott Pich Production
Opakum Borachei		Hum Chora and Ampor Tevi	Legendary	
Shadow of Darkness	Yvon Hem	Pisith Pilika	Romantic drama	first Cambodian film about the Khmer Rouge period
Tngai Chong Krouy - The Last Night		Yuthara Chanee	Romance	Yuthara Chanee 1st film
Tuk Pneik Dany		Ket Somborith and Oum Sovanny	Musical	Entinou Production
Site 2	Rithy Panh			Television film

== See also ==
- List of Khmer entertainment companies
- List of Khmer film actors
- List of Khmer film directors
