= Khun Srun =

- Born: October 3, 1945; Takéo Province, Cambodia
- Died: December 1978 (aged 33)
- Occupation: Writer
- Writing career
- Language: Khmer
- Notable work: The Accused - The Last Residence

Khun Srun (Khmer: ឃុន ស្រ៊ុន, 1945–1978) was an important Cambodian writer. He was born in Char village (ភូមិចារ), Rorvieng sub-district (ឃុំរវៀង), Samrong district (ស្រុកសំរោង), Takéo province, into a poor Chinese Cambodian family.

When he was eight, his father, Khun Kim Chheng, a Chinese man who had fled Communism, died, and he and his six siblings were raised by his mother, Chi Eng, a small shopkeeper and a devout Buddhist.

He began his schooling during the country's first years of independence, when the doors to higher education and professionalization were inching open to all Cambodians, regardless of their social and economic class. A brilliant student, he studied Khmer literature and psychology at the university in Phnom Penh, becoming widely read in sciences, mathematics, and European literature.

Amid the turmoil of the 1960s, he worked as a professor of mathematics and a journalist while writing fiction and poetry. He also worked as a member of the textbook editorial committee at the Ministry of Education. In less than four years, he published three collections of poems, short tales, and philosophical anecdotes; two collections of autobiographical short stories, The Last Residence and The Accused; and a final volume of poems, For a Woman (this last book was probably never published). He was influenced by both existentialism and Cambodian Buddhism.

In 1971, he was imprisoned during 7 months by the right-wing Lon Nol government for refusing to collaborate, but still refused to align himself with the extreme left. In 1973, after being imprisoned for a second time, he finally joined the communist Khmer Rouge guerrillas. He was only 28, and his life as a writer was finished.

After the Khmer Rouge took power, in 1975, Khun Srun (aka Phoeun - ភឿន) was assigned work as a railway engineer). On 20 December 1978, he, his wife and their two youngest children were victims of the last purges of the Khmer Rouge. They were arrested, transferred to Tuol Sleng prison and probably killed in Choeung Ek, few days before the end of Pol Pot's regime. Only Khun Srun's nine-year-old daughter, Khun Khem, survived, taken by Khmer Rouge cadres and forced to live among them in the forest on the Cambodia–Thailand border.

One of his brothers, Khun Ngoy, was among the intellectuals who returned to Cambodia and disappeared from Dey Kraham (Red Land) camp.

The life and writing of Khun Srun is portrayed in Eric Galmard's documentary film, A Tomb for Khun Srun (2015).

== Books ==
- គណិតសាស្ត្រថ្នាក់ទី៣-៤-៥-៦-៧-៨ (Textbook of Mathematics, third-form to eighth-form classes), under the direction of Uy Vanthon, 1970.
- គំហើញទី១ (My Views 1), 1970.
- គំហើញទី២ (My Views 2), 1970.
- គំហើញទី៣ (My Views 3), 1970.
- សៀវភៅជំទង់អំពីចំណេះ (About Knowledge - For Young People), with Peng Soeung (ប៉ែងសឿង), 1971 (Second Edition, 1973).
- សំរស់ជីវិត (The Beauty of Life), 1971 (republished in 1994).
- សៀវភៅជំទង់អំពីស្នេហា (About Love - For Young People), with Peng Soeung (ប៉ែងសឿង), 1971 (Second Edition, 1973).
- កាព្យសាស្រ្តខ្មែរ (Khmer Poetics), written by Ing Yeng (អឹុងយ៉េង), corrected (ពិនិត្យសំរួល) by Khun Srun, 1972.
- ហ្សង់ប៉ូលសាត្រ និងអាល់ប៊ែរកាមិស (About Jean Paul Sartre and Albert Camus), 1972.
- លំនៅចុងក្រោយ (The Last Residence), 1972. This book is composed of five short stories.

"Srun might have written the first story, ផ្លេកបន្ទោរមួយ (A Flash of Lightning), after reading the short story "Erostratus" from Sartre's book, The Wall. When the narrator, a prisoner, takes a shower on the roof of the police station, he suddenly has the delusion that he wants to kill a woman who happens to be there, just as the hero in "Erostratus" while standing on top of a high building decides to kill someone. The second story, ភេទដែលគេជិន (A Disgusted Nature), deals with the confession of a lady teacher who is distrustful of men. One can draw some comparisons with characters from classical stories such as Neang Kakey, Tum Teav, and Reamker. The lady teacher asserts that men have always exploited women, marriage does not bring women happiness and women have a right not to bear a child. The story raises gender issues that are the same today. In ផ្ទះអន្ទិតសុក (Sok's Home), the hero, Sok, leaves his home village and goes to Phnom Penh where he wanders from house to house as a servant. He sees that a rich family who used to live in an elegant home had come on hard times and finally found a place to live in peace in the simple home of a married couple. សាលាខ្ញុំ (My School) and គ្រូភឿន (Mr. Phoeun, a teacher) describe the sweet memories of Srun's schooldays." (Tomoko Okada, Tokyo University of Foreign Studies)

- ជនជាប់ចោទ (The Accused), 1973 (written after being jailed for the first time by the Lon Nol regime, from 1 February to 6 September 1971) : 1. សំរែកអ្នកសរសេរ 2.ជីវិតជាប់ចោទ 3.ខ្ញុំមិនទាន់យល់ 4.ជនជាប់ចោទ

"Khun’s last novel, The Accused, published in 1973, is narrated by a writer imprisoned by Cambodia’s military government. The accused asserts that he is not a person of politics or even a man of conviction, simply an observer and a writer. He, a lover of literature, wants to flee the country and be part of the wider world; yet he wants, also, to have the courage to risk his life for his principles. Shortly after The Accused was published, Khun left Phnom Penh and joined the Khmer Rouge." (Madeleine Thien, Brick Magazine)

- ចិត្តសាស្ដ្រសំរាប់គ្រប់គ្នា (Psychology For All, 1973, unpublished?)
- ជូននារីម្នាក់ (For a Woman, 1973, unpublished?)

== Translations ==
- The Last Residence (終の住処): phlek bonto muoy いなびかり, phet dael ke chin (男嫌い), phteah antet sok (ソックの家), salaa khnom (学校); translated from Khmer to Japanese by Tomoko Okada, in Modern Short Stories, Cambodian Studies, Tokyo University of Foreign Studies, The Daido Life Foundation, 2001.
- Un homme en examen (extraits) translated from Khmer to French by Christophe Macquet, in Revue Europe, "Écrivains du Cambodge", 81e année, N° 889 / Mai 2003. Republished in Revue bilingue MEET, n°15, bilingual Khmer/French edition, Porto Rico / Phnom Penh, 2011.
- The Accused (excerpt), translated from Khmer to French by Christophe Macquet and from French to English by Daniela Hurezanu and Stephen Kessler, In the Shadow of Angkor: Contemporary Writing From Cambodia, Mānoa, University of Hawaii Press (2004).
- Je déteste le mot et la lettre ត (tâ) translated from Khmer to French by Christophe Macquet, in Revue Europe, "Écrivains du Cambodge", 81e année, N° 889 / Mai 2003.
- I Hate the Word and the Letter ត (Ta), translated from Khmer to French by Christophe Macquet and from French to English by Daniela Hurezanu and Stephen Kessler, In the Shadow of Angkor: Contemporary Writing From Cambodia, Mānoa, University of Hawaii Press (2004).
- Fragments from The Accused, translated from Khmer to French by Christophe Macquet and from French to English by Madeleine Thien, Brick Magazine 97, Summer 2016.
- L'accusé (ជនជាប់ចោទ, The Accused, 1973), translated from Khmer to French and prefaced by Christophe Macquet, Éditions du Sonneur, Paris, April 2018, 128 pages.
- The Accused (excerpt), translated from Khmer to French by Christophe Macquet and from French to English by Madeleine Thien, in Who Will Speak for America?, edited by Stephanie Feldman and Nathaniel Popkin, July 2018.
- From The Accused, translated from Khmer to French by Christophe Macquet and from French to English by Madeleine Thien, Out of the Shadows of Angkor: Cambodian Poetry, Prose, and Performance through the Ages, Mānoa, University of Hawaii Press (2022).
- An Introduction to The Accused, by Christophe Macquet, translated from French by Madeleine Thien, Out of the Shadows of Angkor: Cambodian Poetry, Prose, and Performance through the Ages, Mānoa, University of Hawaii Press (2022).

== Quotes ==
- "I know it's dangerous to live among men." (The Accused)
- "In Solzhenitsyn's novella [Matryona's Place], the widow, Matryona, possesses nothing. Why accumulate goods, she wonders, only to live in fear of dispossession, only to hold fast to our belongings rather than our lives? Hers is in an uncommon way of seeing, certainly, yet I find myself in kinship with her. I have never wanted to possess villas nor land nor wealth because I imagine that, at the moment of my death, my attachment to them would bring me only sorrow. Far better to lead an untethered existence." (The Accused)
- "I do have one hope left, however. A tiny one. I know I am innocent and wrongly accused. So I try to fool myself, I try to be an optimist: the inspector is a Khmer; he has dark skin and the same blood as I do." (The Accused)

== See also ==
- Choeung Ek
- Chuth Khay
- Hak Chhay Hok
- Kang Kek Iew (Duch)
- Keng Vannsak
- Kong Bunchhoeun
- Rithy Panh
- Soth Polin
- Tuol Sleng prison
- Vorn Vet
- Yim Guechse
