= The Burnt Theatre =

2005 film by Rithy Panh

- The theatrical poster
- French: Les Artistes du Théâtre Brûlé
- Directed by: Rithy Panh
- Written by: Rithy Panh; Agnès Sénémaud
- Starring: Bopha Chheng; Than Nan Doeun; Peng Phan
- Cinematography: Prum Mesa
- Edited by: Marie-Christine Rougerie
- Music by: Marc Marder
- Distributed by: Catherine Dussart Productions; Institut national de l'audiovisuel Les Acacias; Arte
- Release date: 15 May 2005 (Cannes)
- Running time: 85 minutes
- Countries: Cambodia; France
- Language: Khmer

The Burnt Theatre (Khmer: មហោស្រពដែលឆេះ, romanized: mhaosrap del cheh, French: Les Artistes du théâtre brûlé) is a 2005 French-Cambodian docudrama directed and co-written by Rithy Panh. A blend of fact and fiction, based on the actual lives of the actors, the film depicts a troupe of actors and dancers struggling to practise their art in the burned-out shell of Cambodia's former national theatre, the Preah Suramarit National Theatre in Phnom Penh.

The Burnt Theatre premiered at the 2005 Cannes Film Festival as an official selection in the out-of-competition main programme, and has been screened at several other film festivals.

== Synopsis ==
While much of Cambodia's cultural heritage was eradicated through the deaths of many artists during the Khmer Rouge era, the country's main theatrical structure, Preah Suramarit National Theatre remained standing throughout the Cambodian Civil War, even occasionally being used by the communist regime for official visits and propaganda pageants. Ironically, it was while the theatre was undergoing repairs in 1994 that it caught fire, was heavily damaged and has never been restored.

It is in this roofless performance hall that a Khmer classical dance troupe continues to practise daily, and a troupe of actors attempts to produce a Khmer-language adaptation of Cyrano de Bergerac on a stage overgrown with weeds.

Around the theatre, Phnom Penh, the nation's capital and largest city, is being rebuilt and redeveloped. Next door, a casino and resort hotel are being built, and the slamming sound of the pile drivers provides a counterpoint to the action in the theatre.

Into the situation comes a journalist, Bopha Chheang, who interviews actor Than Nan Doeun, who portrays Cyrano. He and other actors reflect on the great productions of the past but lament the difficulties they are faced in a society that seems to have forgotten they exist.

Some of the actors receive a small stipend, around $10 to $15 a month, from the government, and supplement their incomes by appearing in karaoke videos and performing at nightclubs.

"Soon people won't know what theatre is," one actor says. "Everyone will be watching ghost films or singing the same lyrics like parrots."

Also interviewed is actress Peng Phan (she appeared in Rithy Panh's One Evening After the War and Rice People), who is racked with Survivor guilt and is overcome by psychosomatic illness.

The reporter's questioning and the activities of the performers are intercut with scenes of men and women sifting through refuse at a garbage dump. At another point, the members of the theatre troupe forage for food in the theatre itself, harvesting bats from the ceiling of the theatre halls and frying the winged mammals in a wok.

== Cast ==
- Bopha Chheng
- Than Nan Doeun
- Peng Phan
- Hoeun Ieng
- Rotha Kèv
- Sok Ly
- Pok Dy Rama

== Production ==
Rithy Panh had co-written the script for The Burnt Theatre, which he then adapted during the shooting of the film to incorporate actual experiences of the performers, blending fact and fiction in a docudrama style.

"The idea at the heart of this film is to gather a group of actors around a project that exemplifies the reality Cambodian people live in: something inside us – dignity, identity – is rotting to shreds. To recover our memory after the tragedy of genocide," the director wrote in a synopsis for the 2005 Cannes Film Festival. "We are in the process of losing our memory. Cambodia is a land of broken dreams. There is no more theatre, no more playhouses."

The film is an urging by the director to restore Cambodia's lost cultural heritage. In comments prepared for the Tokyo Filmex in 2005, Panh wrote:

"When it comes to reconstruction, we must restore our identity first and have some space of cultural expression to do so. In Cambodia, we say: 'When culture vanishes, the nation collapses.' How can we build our country if culture remains confined to survival when transmission of memory's so much at stake? Culture should be a priority because it is so instrumental in healing our wounds, overcoming traumas and building democracy. The situation of the burnt theatre serves as a symbol of Cambodia's situation, just as of many other developing countries'. Are we to reduce culture to its folklore dimension? And yet… To break away with 'culture of survival', and overcome stupor of trauma, we need a link, we need continuity. Artists embody such a link. Through creations, they can avoid breaking up with our past, they can restore dignity of memory."

== Release ==
The Burnt Theatre premiered at the 2005 Cannes Film Festival as an official selection in the out-of-competition main programme. The film was also screened at the Rio de Janeiro International Film Festival, São Paulo International Film Festival, Tokyo Filmex (in competition), the 2006 Bangkok International Film Festival, the San Francisco International Asian American Film Festival, and the Singapore International Film Festival. It has also been broadcast on the Arte television network in Europe.

== Reception ==
Commenting on the film's premiere at Cannes, Variety film critic Jay Weissberg, said the film's hybrid blend of documentary and drama made for a less-than-cohesive film. "Fictional and documentary elements occasionally jostle uncomfortably with each other, especially in scene transitions which can feel overly artificial," he wrote. "Far more powerful are shots of the cavernous theatre itself, where the air is consistently punctuated with the sounds of jackhammers working on an enormous casino nearby. This juxtaposition, between the crumbled theatre and the rising monument to a new-found capitalism, makes a much stronger statement."
