= Keng Vannsak =

Cambodian philosopher and Khmer linguist

- កេង វ៉ាន់សាក់
- Vannsak in Paris, France in 2005
- Born: 19 September 1925; Kampong Cham Province, Cambodia, French Indochina
- Died: 18 December 2008 (aged 83); Montmorency, France
- Citizenship: Cambodia; France
- Education: University of Caen Normandy
- Occupations: Philosopher; linguist
- Political party: Democratic
- Spouse: Suzanne Colleville

Keng Vannsak (Khmer: កេង វ៉ាន់សាក់, Kéng Vănsăk [keːŋ ʋansak]; 19 September 1925 – 18 December 2008) was a Cambodian scholar, philosopher and Khmer linguist. He invented the Khmer typewriter keyboard in 1952. He lived in exile in Paris, France, from 1970 until his death in 2008. He died at the age of eighty-three at the hospital of Montmorency in the outskirts of Paris after suffering from a chronic illness.

In modern Cambodia, Vannsak is known for being one of the influential figures for the next generations of Cambodian scholars and intellectuals. He left behind him a legacy in literature, including two drama plays, short stories, many poems and his research from the 1940s.

Politically left-wing, he was a member of the radical Democratic Party, and stood unsuccessfully as its MP candidate in the 1955 elections. He was also a friend and mentor of Saloth Sar (later known as Pol Pot) while both of them were studying in Paris.

Along with Iv Koeus and Khuon Sokhamphu, Keng Vannsak was one of the three pioneers of Khmer linguistics and grammar.

== Biography ==
Keng Vannak was born in a small village in Kampong Cham province on 19 September 1925, the same year Pol Pot was born. Vannsak mentored Pol Pot while both were in France. Both of them appeared to share an opinion on "original Khmer", considering Buddhism and Hinduism had contaminated the Khmer original culture.

After obtaining his baccalaureate in philosophy in 1946 in Phnom Penh, Vannsak continued his studies in Paris on a scholarship and worked as a Khmer-language assistant at the National School of Modern Eastern Languages (Ecole nationale des Langues Orientales). During his studies, he spent two years teaching Khmer language at the School of Oriental and African Studies, University of London.

He later married Suzanne Colleville, a French national, who shared with him a passion for Eastern languages. She held diplomas in the Cambodian, Lao, and Thai languages, and also obtained a degree in physical science at the University of Caen, as revealed by the (unpublished) writing of Khing Hoc Dy, a former student as well as friend of Keng Vannsak.

== Career ==
In 1952, he returned to Cambodia with his wife and a bachelor's degree which he obtained at the Faculty of Literature and Human Science University of Paris in 1951. He later worked as a teacher at the prestigious Lycée Sisowath and the National Institute of Pedagogy in Phnom Penh, and decided to stay there from 1952 to 1958.

The most radical of his friends began distancing themselves from him. He covered for the president of the Cambodian Students Association when the group was invited to attend "youngsters' world peace celebrations" in Berlin, but was eventually asked not to go with the group just before they were due to leave.

"Half a century later, Vannsak still fulminated" at the simple idea of it, Philip Short says. Keng Vannsak explained to him that the other ones wanted to get rid of him. Short quoted him: "They knew that I was not the tough kind like them. I thought too much. I was not a stubborn person and did not act with fanaticism nor like an extremist. Ieng Sary, a former high school classmate who later became Minister of Foreign Affairs of the Khmer Rouge government himself told me later: 'You are too sensitive. You will never be a politician. In order to make politics, you have to be tough. You will not get there, brother. You are too sentimental'".

== Beliefs ==
Strongly opposed to the Cambodian monarchy, Vannsak was also known for his role as a mentor to Saloth Sar, later known as Pol Pot, who ruled Cambodia from 1975 to 1979. During Pol Pot's rule of Cambodia, at least two million people died from execution, starvation and overwork.

=== A mentor for Cambodian students in Paris ===
Keng Vannsak became one of the key figures of the Cambodian student community in Paris. As described by historian Philip Short in his book titled "Pol Pot – Anatomy of a Nightmare", during the winter of 1950, more exclusive student meetings took place several times every month at Keng Vannsak's flat in Paris “to discuss political issues and more precisely about the future of Cambodia, a country which, for the first time, was directly affected by the war in Vietnam”. The historian explains that the meetings was the beginning of Saloth Sar's political training and more involvement into the Khmer political affairs.

Philip Short also details that at that time communism was not their main concern, and recalls that Vannsak himself was more aware of political reality than most of his fellow-students. Vannsak appeared to offend a young Frenchwoman of the high bourgeoisie by offering her, a year before, to go and spend the afternoon at the Fête de l'Humanité, organised by the French Communist Party.

He said: "I had no idea it was a Communist meeting. I thought it was just a celebration for humanity, that's all." Vannsak's studies group tried to stay away from the political labels as most of the members prefer themselves to be part of a progressist trend.

=== Opposition to Khmerization program ===
Vannsak and French-oriented scholars opposed the Khmerization strategy for capturing French terms in the Khmer language via neologism, promoted by Chuon Nath, and instead preferred to transliterate French words into Khmer using the same pronunciation as much as possible with the Khmer script.

== Legacy ==
In 1952, he invented the Khmer typewriter keyboard. After his death, Prime Minister Hun Sen expressed his regret, saying Cambodia lost a well-known intellectual. Before his death, Vannsak wrote a letter to Premier Hun Sen to let him know that he wanted to visit Cambodia after many years spent abroad since the 1970s. His very close friends said that Vannsak had a very last wish to have his ashes buried inside his mother's stupa in Cambodia.

== See also ==
- Chuon Nath
- Chuth Khay
- Hak Chhay Hok
- Khun Srun
- Kong Bunchhoeun
- Norodom Sihanouk
- Pol Pot
- Soth Polin
- Vandy Kaonn
