= Chhnam Oun 16 (1992 film) =

Chhnam Oun 16 (1993)
- Directed by: Fai Som Ang
- Produced by: Yvette Som
- Starring: Tep Rundaro; Pisith Pilika; Ampor Tevi
- Music by: Sinn Sisamouth
- Release date: 1992
- Running time: 65 minutes
- Country: Cambodia
- Language: Khmer

Chhnam Oun 16 is a 1992 Cambodian musical movie starring Tep Rundaro, Pisith Pilika, Oum Sovanny, Ampor Tevi, and other stars of the time. The film was released as the 8th Som Ang Rathanak's musical film.

== Cast ==
- Tep Rundaro
- Yous Bovannak
- Pisith Pilika
- Ampor Tevi
- Hong Polee Maktura
- Neary Roth Guntea
- Yuthara Chany
- Keo Koliyan
- Hok Leakenna
- Oum Sovanny
- Prum Sovuthy
- Jandarathy
- Bae Vannara
- Chum Achun
- Serey Vichara
- Aek Omrah

== Soundtrack ==
Song	Singer(s)	Notes
Jomrieng Snae	Prum Sovuthy and Un Sophal	Prum Sovuthy and Oum Sovanny
1 Komplieng Anuksavary	Sinn Sisamouth and Ros Serey Sothear	Tep Rundaro and Pisith Pilika
Tep Tida Tan Gondal	Sinn Sisamouth	Chom Achun, Bae Vannara, and Serei Vichara
Chnam Oun 16	Ros Serey Sothear	Ampor Tevi, Prum Sovuthy, Arun Reksmey, Hong Polee Maktura
Jeung Mek Snae	Sinn Sisamouth and Ros Serey Sothear	Bae Vannara, Keo Koliyan, Prum Sovuthy
Neary Borotes	Sinn Sisamouth	Choum Dara Chaya, Oum Sovanny
Jrolom Pdei Ke	Pan Ron	Hong Polee Maktura, Arun Reksmey, Jandarathy
Tearun Duong Jet	Him Sivorn	Prum Sovuthy and Aek Omrah
Choum Chaut Pisey	Sinn Sisamouth and Ros Serey Sothear	Yuthara Chany and Neary Roth Guntea
Kru Kmeng Tnam Khmer	Sinn Sisamouth	Neay Kuy, Hok Leakenna
Soben 3 Yup	Sinn Sisamouth	Hong Polee Maktura and Neary Roth Guntea
