= Soth Polin =

Cambodian writer

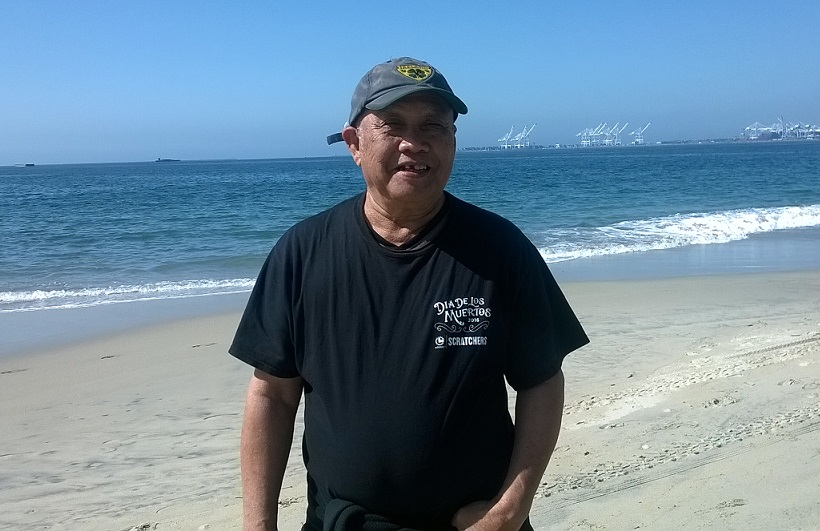
- Soth Polin in Long Beach (April 2017)
- Born: February 9, 1943 (age 83); Kampong Cham Province, Cambodia, French Indochina
- Citizenship: United States
- Occupation: Writer
- Writing career
- Language: Khmer and French
- Notable works: The Anarchist, A Bored Man, We Die Only Once, Dead Heart

Soth Polin (Khmer: សុទ្ធ ប៉ូលីន) is a Cambodian writer. He was born in the hamlet of Chroy Thmar, Kampong Siem District, Kampong Cham Province, Cambodia. His maternal great-grandfather was the poet Nou Kan (who wrote Teav-Ek, ទាវឯក, a version of Tum Teav, the masterpiece of Khmer love poetry). He grew up speaking both French and Khmer. Throughout his youth, he immersed himself in the classical literature of Cambodia and, at the same time, the literature and philosophy of the West.

His first novel, A Meaningless Life, published in 1965 (he was 22 years old), was strongly influenced by Nietzsche, Freud, Sartre and Buddhist philosophy. It was an enormous success. Numerous novels and short stories followed, among them The Adventurer With No Goal, A Bored Man, We Die Only Once, and Dead Heart. He also worked as a journalist in Khmer Ekareach (The Independent Khmer), the newspaper of his uncle, Sim Var, and in the late 1960s, he founded (with Sin Kim Suy) his own newspaper and publishing house, Nokor Thom (នគរធំ / The Great Kingdom). He was a militant nationalist who was both anti-Sihanouk and anti-communist. Through his newspaper, he supported the pro-American government of General Lon Nol before finally distancing himself and suddenly taking refuge in France in 1974, after the assassination of his friend, Thach Chea, the Deputy Minister of Education.

His father and two of his brothers died during the Khmer Rouge regime. He worked in Paris as a taxi driver and published his dark cult novel The Anarchist, written in French. Later he and his two sons moved to the West Coast of the United States, where he now resides. His brother-in-law is Mam Sonando.

== Works ==
=== Novels and novellas (in Khmer) ===
- ជីវិតឥតន័យ (A Meaningless Life, Phnom Penh, 1965; republished by Nokor Thom in the 1970s; republished in Paris by L'Institut de l'Asie du Sud-Est in the 1980s) .
- ខូចសតិព្រោះកាមតណ្ហា (Crazy for Sex, Phnom Penh, 1965).
- ស្នេហ៍អពមង្គល (A Miserable Love, Phnom Penh, 1965).
- អូនជាម្ចាស់ស្នេហ៍ (You Are My Heart, Phnom Penh, 1966; republished by Avatar Publishing, Phnom Penh, 2025).
- ក្ស័យតែម្ដងទេ (We Die Only Once, Phnom Penh, 1967).
- ចំតិតឥតអាសូរ (Fucking/Showing My Ass with No Mercy, Phnom Penh, 1967), banned by Sihanouk authorities and secretly republished under the title ចំតិតទៀតហើយ (Fucking/Showing My Ass Again).
- បុរសអផ្សុក (A Bored Man, Phnom Penh, 1968; republished by Avatar Publishing, Phnom Penh, 2025).
- អ្នកផ្សងព្រេងអារាត់អារាយ (The Adventurer with No Goal, Phnom Penh, 1969; republished by L'Institut de l'Asie du Sud-Est, Paris, 1982)
- អ្នកមេម៉ាយនៅអិល-អេ (The Widow from L.A., Long Beach, 1993).
- ស្នេហាដាច់ខ្យល់នៅឡាសវ៉េហ្គាស (Love Vanishes in Las Vegas, Long Beach, 1995).

=== Collections of short stories (in Khmer) ===
- ឲ្យបងធ្វើអី... បងធ្វើដែរ! (Whatever You Order Me... I Will Do It, Phnom Penh, 1969; republished by Avatar Publishing, Phnom Penh, 2025) : 1.ការទាក់ទងគ្នា... 2.បង្គាប់មកបងចុះអូន!...3.អ្វីៗដែលផ្លាស់ប្ដូ!... 4.ឲ្យបងធ្វើអី... បងធ្វើដែរ!
- មរណៈក្នុងដួងចិត្ត (Dead Heart, Phnom Penh, 1973) : 1.ព្រលឹងប្ដីអើយ... ខ្លួនអូនរហែក... 2.រកគន្លិះប្ដីខ្ញុំ... មិនឃើញសោះ... 3.ពស់ក្បាលពីរ... 4.ក្បាលបោកផ្ទប់នឹងជញ្ជាំង... 5.ស៊ូទ្រាំគ្រាំគ្រាយូរមកហើយ... 6.មរណៈក្នុងដួងចិត្ត...
- ស្ដេចចង់ (The Game of the King's Desire, Long Beach, 1992) : 1.ស្ដេចចង់ 2.កសាងស្រមោលអតិតៈ 3.ក្លិនតណ្ហានៅហ្វ្រេស្ណូ

=== Play (in Khmer) ===
- បាក់ធ្មេញ (Broken Tooth, Long Beach, 1995).

=== Essays, articles and translation (in Khmer) ===
- ស្រុកយើងមានសន្តិភាពមែនឬ?, Nokor Thom, 1974.
- ស្រុកយើងអើយវេទនាដោយសារគេ, Nokor Thom, 1974.
- ជីវប្រវត្តិសង្ខេបនៃទស្សនវិទូក្រិកដ៍ល្បីល្បាញជាងគេក្នុងបុរាណកាល (translation of François Fénelon's book: Abrégé des vies des anciens philosophes), 2004, Angkor Borey.
- Political pamphlets online, Devaraja, 2005.
- Preface of Sang Savat’s novel, The Big Thief at the Border (km:រឿងមហាចោរនៅទល់ដែន) written in 1955 and republished by Nokor Thom in 1973 (Sang Savat was allegedly murdered by government officer in 1958 on Kirirom Mountain).

=== Novel and short stories (in French) ===
- L'Anarchiste (Éditions de la Table ronde, novel, Paris, 1980; republished in 2011, with a preface by Patrick Deville and in 2025, illustrated by Séra).

«The Anarchist flouts the mythology of "la belle France" and takes us to an entrepôt of broken dreams where the trauma of war haunts a Cambodian émigré, whose monologue comprises the second half of the novel. In Paris, weeks after the fall of the Khmer Rouge, the Cambodian taxi-driver Virak unburdens himself of a terrible secret. His audience is fresh road-kill: a young English tourist who is a victim of his distracted driving. Unlike other Europeans in the novel, who impose their own journalistic or ethnographic narratives on Cambodia, she cannot talk back.» (Penny Edwards, Berkeley University).

- Des lunettes pour la frime, short story, Paris (unpublished).
- Du café sans sucre, short story, Paris (unpublished).

=== Essays, articles, and miscellaneous works (in French) ===
- La composition française au DESPC, Phnom Penh, 1964, with Ke Sokhan and To Chhun.
- Contes et récits du Cambodge, Pich-Nil Éditeur, Phnom Penh, 1966.
- Kompong Cham, symbole de notre survie (deux ans de pourrissement / les sauveurs), Nokor Thom, Phnom Penh, 1973.
- Aperçu sur l'évolution de la presse au Cambodge, with Sin Kim Suy, Phnom Penh, 1974 (translated in English and published in Newspapers in Asia: Contemporary Trends and problems, edited by John A. Lent, 219-37, Hong Kong: Heinemann Asia, 1982).
- Dictionnaire Français-Khmer, Phnom Penh, 1974.
- Témoignages sur le génocide du Cambodge (Testimonies of the Genocide of Kampuchea), collected from Cambodian refugees on the border of Thailand; one of the first books to alert the world about the genocide in progress in Cambodia, co-authored with fr:Bernard Hamel, Paris, S.P.L., 1976.
- De Sang et de Larmes: la Grande Déportation du Cambodge, (co-authored with fr:Bernard Hamel, but Soth Polin didn't want to reveal his authorship, because he feared reprisals against his family), Albin Michel, Paris, 1977.
- Petit dictionnaire français-khmer, Boulogne-Billancourt, CAMA [Comité inter-missions pour les réfugiés du Sud-Est asiatique en France], 1980.
- La diabolique douceur de Pol Pot, Le Monde, 1980. Translated from French to English by Jeremy Colvin and Lavonne Leong, Mānoa, University of Hawaii Press, 2004, The Diabolic Sweetness of Pol Pot.
- L’histoire d'une malédiction (ou le malheur d'être cambodgien), Revue universelle des Faits et des idées, Paris, 1980.
- Et le Cambodge bascula dans la guerre, Revue universelle des Faits et des idées, 1980.
- Et Bouddha, le "saccageur de rêves" usurpa le trône divin, fr:Revue universelle des Faits et des idées, Paris, 1981.
- Histoire du jeune moine qui voulut être crocodile, Revue universelle des Faits et des idées, 1981.
- Hari-Hara ou la divinité fondatrice d'Angkor, Revue universelle des Faits et des idées, 1982.
- Les chemins de l'Apocalypse, 350 pages, 1998 (unpublished).

=== Translations of his work ===
- Soth Polin translated and adapted his own novel ចំតិតឥតអាសូរ (Fucking/Showing My Ass with No Mercy, Phnom Penh, 1967) into French, to use it as the first part of L'Anarchiste.
- ひとづきあい Communicate, They Say (ការទាក់ទងគ្នា...) from 僕に命令しておくれ (ឲ្យបងធ្វើអី... បងធ្វើដែរ / Whatever You Order Me... I Will Do It, 1969), translated from Khmer to Japanese by Tomoko Okada (岡田知子), in Modern Short Stories (現代カンボジア短編集), Cambodian Studies, Tokyo University of Foreign Studies, The Daido Life Foundation (大同生命国際文化基金), 2001.
- Communiquer, disent-ils... Translated from Khmer to French by Christophe Macquet, in Revue Europe, "Écrivains du Cambodge", 81e année, N° 889 / Mai 2003. See also Revue bilingue MEET, n°15, Porto Rico / Phnom Penh, 2011.
- Communicate, They Say, translated from Khmer to French by Christophe Macquet and from French to English by Jean Toyama, In the Shadow of Angkor: Contemporary Writing From Cambodia, Mānoa, University of Hawaii Press (2004).
- Demonic Fragrance (ក្លិនតណ្ហានៅហ្វ្រេស្ណូ from ស្ដេចចង់, The Game of the King's Desire, 1992), short story translated into English by his two sons, Bora Soth and Norith Soth (unpublished).
- The Anarchist (extract), translated by Penny Edwards, in Words Without Borders Magazine, November 2015.
- Soth Polin, with an extract of The Anarchist translated by Penny Edwards, in Mekong Review, Volume 1, Number 1, November 2015.
- Génial et génital The four short stories of ឲ្យបងធ្វើអី... បងធ្វើដែរ! (Whatever You Order Me... I Will Do It, Phnom Penh, 1969), translated from Khmer to French and prefaced by Christophe Macquet, Editions Le Grand Os, France, September 2017.
- Nul ne peut faire revivre les morts កសាងស្រមោលអតិតៈ, the second short story of ស្ដេចចង់ (The Game of the King's Desire, Long Beach, 1992), translated from Khmer to French by Christophe Macquet, Éditions Jentayu, magazine of Asian literature in French, Volume 9, 2019.
- L’anarchico translated from French to Italian by Alessandro Giarda, Obarrao Edizioni, in-Asia/Cambogia, 2019.
- Command Me to Exist, translated from Khmer to French by Christophe Macquet and from French to English by Françoise Bénichou, Out of the Shadows of Angkor: Cambodian Poetry, Prose, and Performance through the Ages, Mānoa, University of Hawaii Press (2022).
- From The Anarchist, translated from French by Penny Edwards, Out of the Shadows of Angkor: Cambodian Poetry, Prose, and Performance through the Ages, Mānoa, University of Hawaii Press (2022).
- From The Aroma of Desire in Fresno, translated from Khmer by Bora Soth and Norith Soth, Out of the Shadows of Angkor: Cambodian Poetry, Prose, and Performance through the Ages, Mānoa, University of Hawaii Press (2022).

== See also ==
- Chuth Khay
- Hak Chhay Hok
- Keng Vannsak
- Khun Srun
- Kong Bunchhoeun
- Mam Sonando
- Norodom Sihanouk
- Sim Var
- Vandy Kaonn
