= Pov Malis Lea =

- Starring: Tep Rundaro; Ampor Tevi; Pisith Pilika; Sok Sreymom; Arun Reksmey
- Release date: 1993
- Country: Cambodia
- Language: Khmer

Neang Pov Malis Lea (Khmer: នាងពៅម្លិះលា) is a 1993 Cambodian monster film starring Arun Reksemy, Sok Sreymom, Tep Rundaro, Pisith Pilika, Kai Prasith, Ampor Tevi.

== Premise ==
The plot revolves around a princess who is kidnapped by a monster.

== Cast ==
- Arun Reksemy : the monster
- Sok Sreymom : the princess
- Tep Rundaro
- Pisith Pilika
- Kai Prasith
- Ampor Tevi
- Som Dara
- Neary Roth Kunthea

== Production ==
The film is one of the 6 films in which the Cambodian star Pisith Pilika played in 1993 at what is considered the peak of her acting career.

== Reception ==
The film has been called a "truly extravagant creation"
