= Touch Sunnix =

Cambodian musical artist

Touch Sunnix ទូច ស៊ុននិច
- Also known as: Touch Sreynich
- Born: Phnom Penh, Cambodia
- Genres: Traditional Khmer, rock, romvong, saravan, jazz, bossanova, film
- Occupation: Singer
- Years active: 1989–present
- Label: Rasmey Hang Meas
- Website: Touch Sunnix

Touch Sunnix (ទូច ស៊ុននិច, Tuch Sŭn Nĭch; Khmer pronunciation: [tuːc sun nic]) is a singer from Phnom Penh, Cambodia. She began singing at an early age, and her work embodies key themes in Cambodian culture, such as folk stories, traditional Cambodian dancing, freedom of expression, and democracy in the lyrics of her songs.

== 2003 shooting ==
In October 2003, Sunnix survived an attempted assassination in which she lost her mother. They were shot by four men on motorcycles after a shopping trip in Phnom Penh. She sustained serious injuries and was paralyzed from the neck down as a result of the assault, which remains unsolved. The Cambodian king, Norodom Sihanouk, expressed his deep sadness over the attack on the singer, who had occasionally entertained his royal guests.

After her attempted assassination, Sunnix requested that her fans pray for her quick recovery. In 2005, she moved to Sacramento, California, and later to Long Beach, California, where she currently resides.

== Discography ==
The following is a list of songs by the artist in both English and Khmer.

- Aw On Dǎk Lew Khnâng - អាវអូនដាក់ឡេវខ្នង
- Chǎmrieng Lǒk Phka - ចម្រៀងលក់ផ្កា
- Chĕt Ăprei - ចិត្តអប្រីយ៍
- Chĕt Klach Chĕt - ចិត្តខ្លាចចិត្ត (Duet with Bayarith)
- Chhnam On Dǎp Pram Mouy - ឆ្នាំអូន១៦
- Chǎmpei Sâ - ចំប៉ីស (Duet with Song Veacha)
- Daeum Traeng Yol – ដើមត្រែងយោល - (Duet with Veaja)
- Kǎnsaeng Hut Chiey - កន្សែងហូតជាយ (Duet with Veaja)
- Khnhom Chhmuoh Chei Chet - ខ្ញុំឈ្មោះជ័យជេត (Duet with Pha Sophat)
- Klĕn Phka Krâpum - ក្លិនផ្កាក្រពុំ
- Kom Plech Bŏppha Ângkô - កុំភ្លេចបុប្ផាអង្គរ (Duet with Dara Chlangdane)
- Kǎmpǒng Luong Duong Chĕt - កំពង់លួងដួងចិត្ត
- Krâmŏm Taeng Khluon - ក្រមុំតែងខ្លួន
- Meul Ăvei Mleh - មើលអ្វីម្លេះ
- Piano Băt Khtǒng - ព្យាណូបាក់ខ្ទង់
- Preah Kŭn Mday - ព្រះគុណម្ត឵យ
- Prathna Krǒp Chiet - ប្រាថ្នាគ្រប់ជាតិ (Duet with Veaja)
- Phteah Bĭt - ផ្ទះប៉ិត
- Pi Chhnam Cham Snae - ពីរឆ្នាំចាំស្នេហ៍
- Prâlaom Snae - ប្រលោមស្នេហ៍
- Rietrei Ti Muoy - រាត្រីទីមួយ
- Rôbam Nieri Chie Chuo - របាំនារីជាជួរ
- Rôbam Tep Ăpsăra - របាំទេព្វអប្សរា
- Roǎmvǒng Phsâng Rôk Ku - រាំវង់ផ្សងរកគូ
- Rup Ŏn Mĭn L’â - រូបអុនមិនល្អ
- Sarĕka Kaew Kaeut - សារិកាកែវកើត ( Duet with Noy Vanneth)
- Sdăch Dâmrei Sâ - ស្ដេចដំរីស (Duet with Song Veacha)
- Som Haek Khao Khlei - សុំហែកខោខ្លី
- Sâmleng Kên - សំឡេងគែន (Duet with Phanin)
- Sra Muoy Kaew - ស្រាមួយកែវ
- Srânâh Mlǒp Dong - ស្រណោះម្លប់ដូង
- Thlǎng Tha Mĭn Thlǎng - ថ្លង់ថាមិនថ្លង់
- Thngai S’aek Ka Bâng - ថ្ងៃស្អែកការបង
- Tomnuonh Phka Ângkie Prŏh - ទំនួញផ្កាអង្គារបុស្ស(រង់ចាំសន្យា)
- Viesna Kŏlap Kampŭchie - វាសនាកុលាបកម្ពុជា

== Filmography ==
Her work is also featured on many Cambodian karaoke DVDs.

== See also ==
- Kong Bunchhoeun
- Pisith Pilika
- Tat Marina
