= Chuth Khay =

Cambodian writer and translator

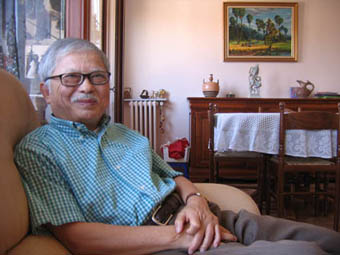
- Born: October 30, 1940 (age 85); Kampong Cham Province
- Occupation: Writer
- Writing career
- Language: Khmer and French
- Notable works: Ghouls, Ghosts, and Other Infernal Creatures

Chuth Khay / ខ្ជិត ខ្យៃ (ហៅ ជុតខៃ) is a Cambodian writer and translator. He was born in 1940 in Koh Somrong, Cambodia, an island on the Mekong about one hundred kilometers north of the capital. The youngest son, he was the only one in a family of ten children to attend a Western school. He pursued primary and secondary studies in Kampong Cham. While working as a teacher of French, he attended classes at the Royal University of Phnom Penh and, in 1968, received his law degree. Opposed to the monarchy, he became a legal advisor to the Ministry of Defense after Sihanouk's removal from power in 1970. From 1973 to 1974, he served as interim dean of the law school. In 1973, he published two successful collections of short stories: Ghouls, Ghosts, and Other Infernal Creatures and Widow of Five Husbands. He also wrote for Soth Polin's newspaper, Nokor Thom (នគរធំ), and published his books and translations with its publishing house. Forced into the countryside by the Khmer Rouge, he miraculously escaped death by pretending to be mute. Granted refuge in France in 1980 and French citizenship, he took the name Chuth Chance, for receiving a second chance in life. He worked for several years as a taxi driver, and is now retired and lives near Paris.

== Publications ==
=== Books (in Khmer) ===
- ខ្មោចព្រាយអសុរកាយ (Ghouls, Ghosts, and Other Infernal Creatures, Phnom Penh, 1973; republished by SIPAR in 2018)
- មេម៉ាយប្ដី ៥ (Widow of Five Husbands, Phnom Penh, 1973; republished by Kampu-Mera Editions in 2022)
- កូនក្របីមានមនោញ្ចេតនា (A Sentimental Baby Buffalo), SIPAR, Phnom Penh, 2010.
- វិប្បដិសារី (Remorse), Angkor Publishing, 2008.
- មេម៉ាយពីរបែប
- ក្មេងសាលាបារាំង (A Young Boy in the French School), SIPAR, Phnom Penh, 2010.
- ក្មេងវត្ត (A Pagoda Kid During the French Time), illustrated by Chan Vitharin, SIPAR, Phnom Penh, 2010.
- ៣២ឆ្នាំក្រោយមក (Thirty-two Years Later), Angkor Editions, Phnom Penh, 2018; republished by Avatar Publishing in 2026).
- អស្តង្គតនៃប្រជាជាតិមួយ (Twilight of a Nation, 1 & 2), Avatar Publishing, Phnom Penh, 2024.
- ខុសព្រោះព្រះ (Buddha's Mistake), eleven short stories illustrated by Sou Kimsan, Avatar Publishing, Phnom Penh, 2025.
- កងទ័ពត្រងោល, (Bald Soldier), five short stories, Avatar Publishing, Phnom Penh, 2025.

=== Translations (to Khmer) ===
- ក្រុមបេរេបៃតង (The Green Berets by Robin Moore, Phnom Penh, Nokor Thom, ?)
- បុត្រឆ្នើមនៃសង្គ្រាម (The Centurions by Jean Lartéguy, Phnom Penh, Nokor Thom, 1971)
- ជញ្ជាំង (The Wall by Jean-Paul Sartre, Phnom Penh, Nokor Thom, 1971)
- លោកឯកអគ្គរដ្ឋទូត (The Ambassador by Morris West, Phnom Penh, Nokor Thom, 1971)

=== Books (in French) ===
- Comment j'ai menti aux Khmers Rouges, L'Harmattan, 2004, 309p.
- L'Indochine vietnamienne, Le Lys Bleu Éditions, 2022, 536p.

=== Translations of his works ===
- Un fantôme au coeur de Phnom-Penh, short story translated to French by Chuth Khay and Alain Daniel, Éditions du Serpent à Plumes, 27, Spring 1995, p. 11-14.
- Goules, démons, et autres créatures infernales... translated from Khmer to French by Christophe Macquet, in Revue Europe, "Écrivains du Cambodge", 81e année, N° 889 / Mai 2003. See also Revue bilingue MEET, n°15, Porto Rico / Phnom Penh, 2011.
- Ghouls, Ghosts, and Other Infernal Creatures, translated from Khmer to French by Christophe Macquet and from French to English by Daniela Hurezanu, In the Shadow of Angkor: Contemporary Writing From Cambodia, Manoa, University of Hawaii Press (2004).
- かわいい水牛の子, A Sentimental Baby Buffalo; 寺の子ども, A Pagoda Kid During the French Time; フランス学校の子ども, A Young Boy in the French School. Translated into Japanese by Tomoko Okada, in Tsuioku no kanbojia (追憶のカンボジア), Tokyo University of Foreign Studies Press, (東京外国語大学出版会), 2014.

== See also ==
- Hak Chhay Hok
- Kong Bunchhoeun
- Keng Vannsak
- Khun Srun
- Soth Polin
- SIPAR
