= Tat Marina =

- តាត ម៉ារីណា

Personal details
- Born: 15 September 1983 (age 43) Phnom Penh
- Children: 2

Tat Marina (Khmer: តាត ម៉ារីណា, born 15 September 1983) is a Cambodian survivor of a high-profile acid throwing attack in 1999. Tat Marina came into public attention when she was doused with acid at the age of 16 years in a jealousy attack, reportedly arranged by a wife of a high-ranking Cambodian government official. The acid attack occurred in a broad daylight. No arrest of the perpetrators was made in the assault of Marina.

Tat Marina now has two children and lives as a political refugee in the United States.

== Early life ==
Marina sold fruit shakes when she was 14 years old, growing up in poverty, in order to earn enough to pay for her father's medical fees and feed the rest of her family. She started spending some of her extra money going to small karaoke places to practice singing, in the hope of being a karaoke star. In 1998, Tat Marina was hired by a production company which produced karaoke videos. There, she was caught in a relationship with a married man who was known as a high-ranking government official. At the beginning, he lied to her that he was a Cambodian American doing business in Cambodia.

== Acid attack ==
Marina was feeding her 3-year-old niece in a downtown market in Phnom Penh when suddenly a few men pulled her to the ground and beat her unconscious. The woman known as a wife of a Cambodian high-ranking official poured five litres of nitric acid. The attackers also scarred themselves with some acid during the attack. No arrest was or has been made in the assault. Marina's face was disfigured. She lost both her ears, half her hearing and her sense of smell.

When giving the interview to the Phnom Penh Post, Marina said that she believed the woman was the wife of Svay Sitha, now head of the Council of Ministers's Quick and Press Relation Unit. He reported his wife, Khoun Sophal, who was eventually charged with the crime but has so far evaded authorities. Marina collaborated with an American documentary maker, Skye Fitzgerald, on a video documentary about her, "Finding Face".

In 2008, a creative writing class at Stanford University wrote and illustrated a graphic novel titled "Shake Girl", partially based on Tat Marina's story.

== After acid attack ==
She flew to Vietnam and the United States for free medical surgery while assisted by her half-brother, Tat Sequando, a Cambodian American medical assistant living in the United States. In 2010, her family members feared for their safety and later fled Cambodia. They are now residing in the Netherlands.

Cambodia drafted a law restricting the sale of acid and outlining punishment for perpetrators of the attacks. The law was endorsed in late 2011. The Human Rights Watch published a 48-page report "What Hell Feels Like," in 2019 .

== See also ==
- Kong Bunchhoeun
- Pisith Pilika
- Touch Sunnix
