= National Institute of Education (Cambodia) =

Higher education institution in Phnom Penh, Cambodia

National Institute of Education វិទ្យាស្ថានជាតិអប់រំ
- Other names: NIE
- Type: higher institute for the training of teachers
- Established: 1914; 112 years ago 1954 (refoundation); 1991 (second refoundation)
- Founders: François Baudouin
- Director: Sieng Sovanna
- Academic staff: 228
- Location: Phnom Penh, Cambodia
- Campus: Urban
- Website: nie.edu.kh

The National Institute of Education (NIE) is a higher education institution that trains teachers in the Kingdom of Cambodia.

== History ==
=== A French colonial project under the leadership of François Baudoin (1914-1954) ===
In 1914, the French protectorate built a primary school called the "Francois Baudoin Primary School" which is considered as the original training school for all teachers in Cambodia. In 1943, the school was renamed the Teacher Training College to provide training for primary school teachers throughout the country.

=== Training an intellectual elite for the Independent Kingdom of Cambodia (1954-1975) ===
From 1958 to 1965, the school was rebranded as the National Institute of Pedagogy with a new mission realizing the urgent need for teachers in the countryside: to "quickly" train primary school teachers in all subjects throughout the country. In 1965, the Institute was renamed once again as the Faculty of Pedagogy. From 1965 to 1975, the Faculty of Pedagogy had the same mission, but added a new one, the training of primary school inspectors, with high hopes that this would allow a standardization of education across the Khmer nation. The Institute is also put in charge of providing valuable assistance to facilitate the delicate task of teachers in the newly independent nation. It regularly published an educational magazine directed by Keng Vannsak for teachers which serves as a guide, keeps them up to date with educational news and provides them with lesson plans. The Institute at the time became a recruiting hub for the communist party. The Institute of Pedagogy was moved to the recently founded Royal University of Phnom Penh in the buildings which now host the Institute of Foreign Languages of the Royal University of Phnom Penh. The National Institute of Education trained 2,992 primary school teachers in all subjects and 66 primary school inspectors. From 1974 to 1975, 141 lower secondary school teachers and 14 primary school inspectors were enrolled in training, but unfortunately they never graduated as the Khmer Rouge came to power.

=== Anti-intellectual shutdown of the Khmers Rouges (1975-1979) ===
From 1975 to 1978, this institution, as well as other institutions throughout the country, was completely closed.

=== A political project under the Kampuchea (1979-1989) ===
After 1979, the institution reopened and was renamed the "Ministry of Education Political School", then became the Central Teacher Training College in 1980 and renamed the "Senior Cadet Management School" in 1986.

=== Reconstructing education along with democracy (1991-present) ===
In 1993, the Institute was renamed "Faculty of Pedagogy" as its original name. The first years were particularly difficult because of dire material conditions, oversupply of students and lack of formators.

IThe Faculty of Pedagogy finally became the National Institute of Education by decision of the Royal Government, headed by Prime Minister Hun Sen, as per sub-decree No. 04, dated March 11, 2004. On February 8, 2005, the name "National Institute of Education" was officially inaugurated under the high presidency of Samdech Akka Moha Sena Padei Techo Hun Sen. On February 28, 2007, the National Institute of Education inaugurated the Samdech Hun Sen and Lok Chumteav Cultural Center. Since 2014, the National Institute of Education has collaborated with the UNESCO International Institute for Educational Planning in order to reach international standards in the training for Khmer teachers.

== Structure ==
The National Institute of Education is the only establishment in charge of training teachers to become high school teachers and educational administration officials at all levels in the country. The Institute provides initial and advanced training. The first allows students with the required background to become teachers and librarians. The second allows trained teachers to become school directors and program directors within the Ministry of Education.

== Alumni students and teachers ==
- King Norodom Sihanouk
- Keng Vannsak
- Pierre Lamant

== Bibliography ==
- Tandon, Prateek; Fukao, Tsuyoshi (2015-01-08). Educating the Next Generation: Improving Teacher Quality in Cambodia. World Bank Publications. ISBN 978-1-4648-0418-2.\
