= Hok Lundy =

Cambodian politician

General Hok Lundy
- ហុក ឡុនឌី
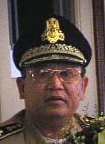

Commissioner-General of the Cambodian National Police
- In office September 1994 – 9 November 2008
- Prime Minister: Norodom Ranariddh; Ung Huot; Hun Sen

Governor of Phnom Penh
- In office 1990–1992
- Preceded by: Thong Khon
- Succeeded by: Sim Ka

Governor of Svay Rieng Province
- In office January 1994 – September 1994

Personal details
- Born: 3 February 1950 Bavet, Svay Rieng, Cambodia, French Indochina
- Died: 9 November 2008 (aged 58) Svay Rieng, Cambodia
- Party: Cambodian People's Party
- Spouse: Men Pheakdey
- Children: 5
- Occupation: Politician, policeman

Military service
- Allegiance: Cambodia
- Branch/service: Royal Cambodian Army; Cambodian Police Force
- Years of service: 1979–2008
- Rank: General
- Battles/wars: 1997 clashes in Cambodia

Hok Lundy (Khmer: ហុក ឡុនឌី) (February 3, 1950 – November 9, 2008), also transliterated as Hok Lundi and Hoc Lundy, was the National Police Commissioner of Cambodia from 1994 to 2008; he had previously been the governor of Svay Rieng Province. He was linked to Hun Sen, the current Prime Minister, whom he met in Vietnam in 1979: during the 1997 military coup, he commanded troops loyal to Hun Sen; as well, his daughter, Hok Chindavy, is married to one of Hun Sen’s sons, Hun Manit.

== Biography ==
Hok Lundy was born in Ta Pov village, Bavet commune, Chanthrea District, Svay Rieng Province to a family of Chinese-Vietnamese origin. Hok Lundy's Vietnamese ancestry was often extensively discussed in public circles, and at least one close aide of Hok Lundy, Cheam Yeap confirmed that he had some Vietnamese ancestry and fluent in the Vietnamese language as well.

He spent his early days in his hometown until 1977 when he fled to Vietnam to become a spy for the Kampuchean United Front for National Salvation. Hok Lundy returned to Cambodia following the fall of the Khmer Rouge, and served in various executive ranks under the People's Republic of Kampuchea in his home province. In 1990, Hok Lundy became the president of the People’s Committee for Phnom Penh. He served as the governor of Svay Rieng Province for 9 months between January and September 1994, before was appointed as the National Police Commissioner.

In the aftermath of the 1997 coup, Funcinpec officials accused Hok Lundy of ordering the attempted murder of Prime Minister Norodom Ranariddh; that same day, Hok Lundy accused Funcinpec of plotting the assassination of Hun Sen, vice-Prime Minister Sar Kheng, and himself.

In February 2006, Hok Lundy was denied a visa to visit the United States due to suspicion of involvement in drug trafficking and human trafficking. In March 2006, he was awarded a medal by the FBI for his efforts in fighting terrorism, and in 2007, he was granted a visa so that he could attend counterterrorism talks.

Heng Pov, a former police chief in Phnom Penh, accused Hok Lundy of involvement in over 70 deaths, including those of several high-profile Cambodian figures such as Pisith Pilika; in return, Hok Lundy accused Heng Pov of involvement in several other murders, including that of a judge.

Human Rights Watch described Hok Lundy as "represent(ing) the absolute worst that Cambodia has to offer", and said that "aside from his boss, Prime Minister Hun Sen, there is hardly anyone in Cambodia who has shown more contempt for the rule of law than Hok Lundy"

Hok Lundy was killed on November 9, 2008, in a helicopter crash in heavy rain, along with General Sok Sa Em, the pilot, and the co-pilot. The official cause of the crash was cited as bad weather and possibly a lightning strike. The helicopter may have also hit something on the way down. Later independent investigations, possibly aligned with opposition political parties, have suggested that the crash may have been caused by sabotage or a missile fired from the ground.

== Personal life ==
Lundy was married to Men Pheakdey and had several children, including Dy Vichea, and Hok Chendavy. Lundy was related to Hun Sen by marriage; Vichea is married to Sen's daughter Hun Mana, while Chendavy is married to Hun Sen's son Hun Manith.
