= Shadow of Darkness =

1989 Cambodian film directed by Yvon Hem

- Directed by: Yvon Hem
- Written by: Yvon Hem
- Starring: Thoang Vutha; Pisith Pilika
- Release date: 1989
- Running time: 111 minutes
- Country: Cambodia
- Language: Khmer

Shadow of Darkness (Khmer: ស្រមោលអន្ធការ, romanized: Sramol anthokear; alternatively Sror Morl Anthakal) is a 1989 Cambodian historical drama film written and directed by Yvon Hem. It is the first Cambodian film to be set during the Democratic Kampuchea era, as previous films about the period such as The Killing Fields and Nine Circles of Hell were from foreign countries. The film tells the fictional story of Visal, who survived the tragic execution of his family by the Khmer Rouge and escapes toward Vietnam.

== Cast ==
- Thoang Vutha
- Pisith Pilika

== Accolades ==
2009 CamboFest

- Grabay Meas (Golden Water Buffalo)
