= Heng Pov =

- Born: Heng Pov; 1 December 1957 (age 68); Prek Pnov Village, Ponhea Leu district, Kandal Province
- Other names: Heng Peo, Heng Peov, Heng Poev, and Heng Pouv
- Spouse: Tung Thi Van (1981-?) Ngin Sotheavy

Heng Pov (Khmer: Heng Pov ហេង ពៅ) (born December 1, 1957, in Kandal Province, Cambodia) was the Undersecretary of State and an assistant to the Minister of the Interior of Cambodia, as well as police commissioner of the city of Phnom Penh, and a personal advisor to Prime Minister Hun Sen.

Heng Pov was born in Kandal province to a family of Chinese-Vietnamese descent. In 1981, Heng Pov married Tung Thi Van, the daughter of Tung Pov, Vietnamese government agent based in Phnom Penh. The following year, Heng Pov joined the police force. Heng Pov was shot in the leg while on police duty in 1992, and his left leg was amputated. In July 2006, while he was in Malaysia for medical treatment on his leg stump, Cambodian officials announced that he was wanted on a variety of charges, including corruption, possession of illegal weapons, involvement in several high-profile murders, and possession of counterfeit currency. Heng Pov responded by seeking refugee status in Malaysia, and by releasing a lengthy statement accusing several high-profile Cambodian officials, including National Police Commissioner Hok Lundy, of corruption and involvement in several high-profile murders, including that of Pisith Pilika.

While Malaysian officials were considering Heng Pov's refugee claim, Cambodian officials tried and convicted him in absentia; Cambodian Minister of Information Khieu Kanharith said "if (he) says he knows about crimes within the government, it means he is an accomplice to these crimes. So he has no right to seek political asylum."

In December 2006, Finland announced that it was willing to grant Heng Pov refugee status; instead, hours before he was supposed leave Malaysia for Finland, Malaysia handed him to Cambodian authorities who took him back to Cambodia in a private plane on 19 December 2006, where he was arrested and sentenced to multiple life sentences. His wife and three of his six children now reside in Finland, where they have been granted status as political refugees.

Khieu Thakvika, spokesman for the Cambodian Ministry of Foreign Affairs, said that if Finland "regrets" about Heng Pov, Cambodia can send many criminals to Finland.
