= Khmer keyboard =

Keyboards accommodating Khmer script

The Khmer keyboard (Khmer: ក្តារចុចជាភាសាខ្មែរ) includes several keyboard layouts for Khmer script.

== History ==
=== First Khmer keyboards in the wake of Independence ===
Keyboard layout of the Cambodian-Keyboard Typewriter produced by Adler around 1955.

Khmer nationalist Ieu Koeus designed a prototype typewriter keyboard for the Khmer script and published the two volume Pheasa Khmer book on the Cambodian language in 1947. While it has been interpreted as symbolic of postcolonial nationalisms consigned to "derivate status [...] at the level of both language and print", adapting the typewriter was also a powerful way to affirm Khmer culture as a weapon for independence rather than the machine guns which were being used by the Issarak.

Soon after, Keng Vannsak was the inventor of a commercial Khmer-script keyboard for typewriters and later computers in 1952.

Industrial production of this typewriter began in 1955 in the Adler factories of West Germany while another similar machine was produced at the same time by Remington in the United States of America. The layout for the more than 120 elements of Cambodian script and punctuation marks was a very difficult task because of the limitation to 46 keys and 96 positions of the standard typewriter.

=== Backlog of the Khmer keyboards after the Cambodian Civil War ===
In the 1980s, computer scientists and linguists outside of Cambodia began working on a new input system for the Khmer language, using the Qwerty keyboard which was taken advantage of for the comparable phonetic frequencies between Khmer and English.

Difficulties had to be overcome, especially the feet used for consonants and phonetic clusters in Khmer script. While the related Thai script writes these clusters in line, the Khmer writing system puts a second member of a consonant cluster under the initial consonant, adding extra difficulty for coding.

After the fall of communism, very few of the data entry clerks had ever typed in Khmer before. A specially designed UNTAC Khmer keyboard was designed but remained used by very few only.

=== Genesis of the Khmer Unicode ===
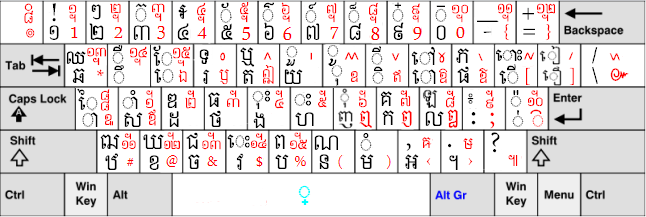
Layout of a Khmer keyboard known as "win", one of the many legacy keyboard in circulation before 2010.

In 1997, Michael Everson wrote a first proposal for encoding the Khmer script in ISO 10646. In the process, it appears that tensions arose as to the proper share of responsibilities between national and international parties, the Cambodian government wanting to take international ownership of all aspects of Khmer in Unicode.

In 2000, an official Committee for the Standardization of Khmer Characters for Computers was set up by the Cambodian government along with the National ICT Development Authority (NiDA) and the Government Administrative Information System (GAIS). A Khmer keyboard was finally developed mainly due to the demand from printing "Unfortunately, working with Khmer Unicode fonts is still houses for experienced technicians." Before mentioning technical difficulties, the Cambodian official objection expressed frustration at a development process which was mostly foreign, whilst the Cambodian keyboard since its inception had been a sensitive aspect of Khmer national identity:

No appropriate official Cambodian representative participated in any of the discussions leading to the adoption of the current code table by ISO/IEC, and this code table has never been officially endorsed within Cambodia.

Mark Davis lamented that:

ISO and Unicode have been working together on the standard for about 10 years, and there has been opportunity for the Cambodian government or individuals to be involved in the process. But we can understand that due to circumstances beyond their control, the Cambodian government may not have been in a position to be involved during this time, and that they may be unhappy with the situation. What we have to do is to sit down and discuss how features of the Cambodian language that can be accommodated by appropriate additions to the Unicode standard.

— Mark Davis

Khmer Unicode NiDA layout.

The Government Administrative Information System project led to the modification and adoption of the Khmer Unicode standard, and an update of the Khmer keyboard. In 2001, Danh Hong, a webmaster and graphic designer from the area of Vietnam known as Kampuchea Krom, programmed Khmer Unicode. Difficulties in teaching the use of this new keyboard layout came from the fact that few hardware Khmer keyboards were produced; instead stickers were added to Roman character keyboards or sometimes a paper model of a Khmer character keyboard was taped nearby. However, by 2010, another foreign observer considered that Khmer script was "widely used and adopted by modern technology" in Cambodia.

=== Khmer keyboards on smartphones since 2012 ===
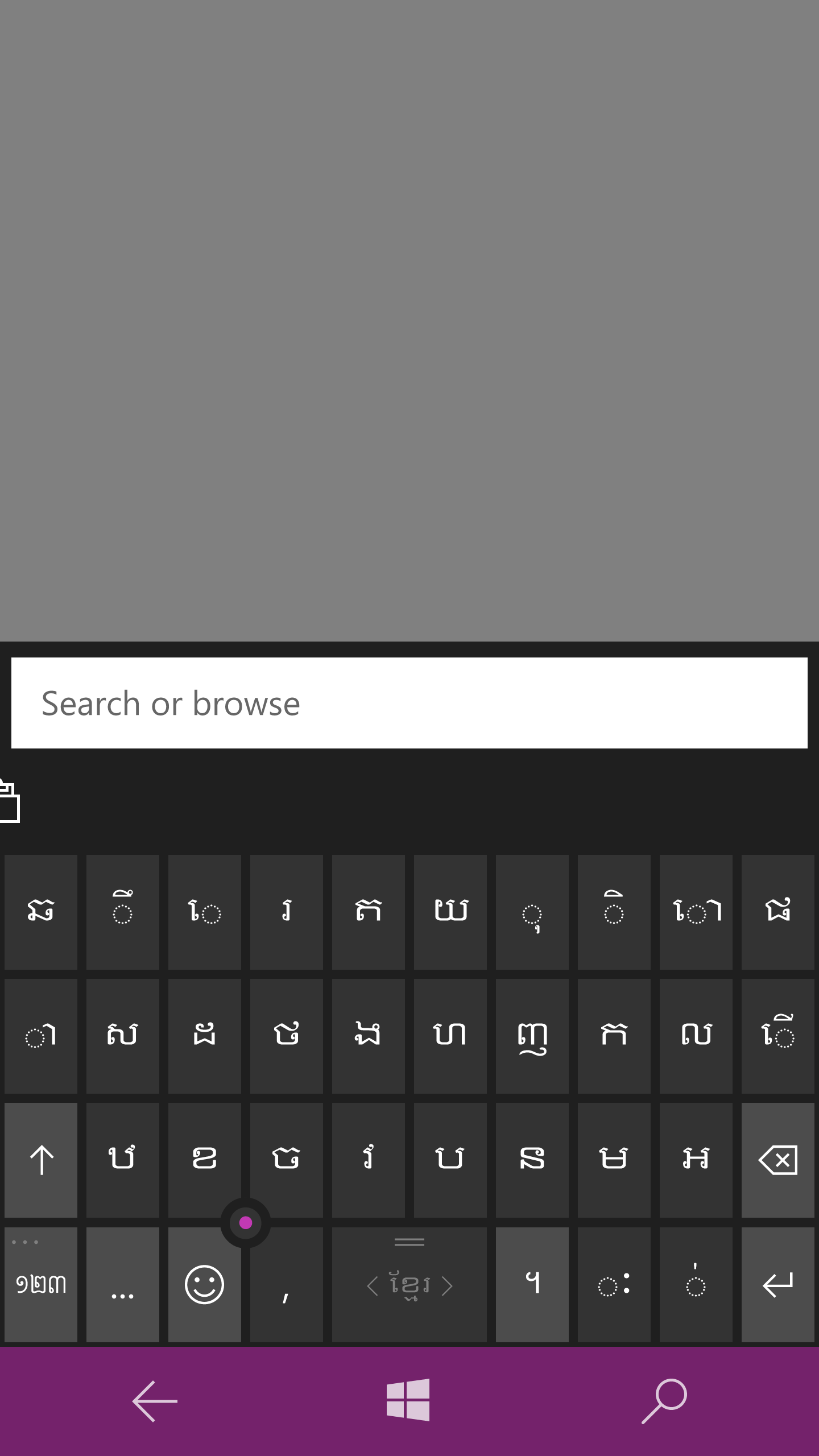
Khmer digital keyboard were first introduced to Cambodia by Nokia as a part of the Microsoft Windows 10 Mobile operating system.

In 2012, Nokia developed a Khmer Unicode with a unique Khmer-language keyboard adapted to smartphones called KhmerMeego. In 2015, as romanization of the Khmer language was becoming more and more widespread in Cambodia, a smartphone application was developed using a “swipe” function to give users access to all of the Khmer letters. This was made possible through technical innovation with touchscreens providing an opportunity for more adaptive Khmer typing as well as the financial support of telecom company Cellcard, which launched a crowdfunding drive to finance the project.

== Description ==
The Nida Unicode Khmer keyboard is currently the most widely used in Cambodia

== Types ==
=== Khmer-input keyboards ===
==== Legacy fonts ====
Pre-Unicode computerized Khmer scripts - known collectively as "legacy" fonts - required the typist to press a complex series of shortcut keystrokes to create a single Khmer character. Legacy fonts added up to more than 30 different ways of encoding the font for Khmer script.

==== Khmer Unicode block ====
The Khmer Unicode block contains characters for writing the Khmer (Cambodian) language. The basic Khmer block was added to the Unicode Standard in version 3.0, released in September 1999. It then contained 103 defined code points; this was extended to 114 in version 4.0, released in April 2003. Version 4.0 also introduced an additional block, called Khmer Symbols, containing 32 signs used for writing lunar dates. Unicode demonstrations prove the speed at which Khmer can be typed is increased "dramatically" compared to legacy fonts.

==== Khmerism keyboard ====
In 2016, a new Cambodia keyboard by P. Lyheng was developed and is known as Khmerism Keyboard. Its aim to preserve the Khmer language online and in digital form by redesigning and rearranging the Khmer keyboard, making it easier to type in Khmer. Rather than use the Qwerty keyboards, it is based on a study of the frequency of Khmer letters in Khmer language and results in a totally different set up of the Khmer keyboard, in order to reduce the use of the shift key which is very frequent in the Khmer Unicode keyboard.

=== Romanized keyboards: KhmerLang ===
The KhmerLang keyboard has a keyboard designed for speed typing with a new design. The keyboard layout supports Roman to Khmer script input with automatic word division using deep learning.
