= Hak Chhay Hok =

Cambodian fiction author

- Born: 1944; Phra Tabong, Thailand
- Died: 1975? (aged 30–31); Kampuchea
- Occupation: Writer
- Writing career
- Language: Khmer

Hak Chhay Hok (Khmer: ហាក់ ឆៃហុក, 1944–1975) was a Cambodian writer. Born in the province of Phra Tabong. He was one of the most prolific Cambodian writers of 1960s and the 1970s. He wrote fifty novels, collaborated with a number of journals, and occasionally worked for the cinema. His best-known works include O Fatal Smoke, Drifting with Karma, The Lightning of the Magic Sword, In the Shadow of Angkor, and Oh! Sorry, Dad!. A few months after the Fall of Phnom Penh, he published Little Manual for the Dissipation of Misery. He was disappeared by the Khmer Rouge.

The Cambodian writer Soth Polin said: “There will be another generation of writers. But right now, what we have lost is indescribable. Khun Srun, Hak Chhay Hok, Chou Thani, Kim Seth... They are gone... What we have lost is not reconstructable. An epoch is finished. So when we have literature again, it will be a new literature."

== Bibliography ==
=== Under his real name ===
1. កុំធ្វើបាបអូនណាបង (Don't Hurt Me, Please, 1965)
2. ក្រមុំខ្វាក កំលោះស្លឈាម (1965)
3. ក្រពើសុពណ៌កាឡី (The Crocodile of Phnom Sopor Kaley, 1965)
4. ក្រោមម្លប់អង្គរ (In the Shadow of Angkor, 1965)
5. នឹកអូនជានិច្ច (Always Missing You, 1965)
6. នៅក្នុងលោកនេះបើគ្មានបង (In this World Without You, 1965)
7. មាតាប្រហារបុត្រ (Mother Killing Her Son, 1965)
8. អូនស្រលាញ់តែបងម្នាក់ (You Are My Only Love, 1965)
9. ឱផ្សែងមរណៈ (O Fatal Smoke, 1965)
10. ចាំជាតិក្រោយណាបង (Let's Wait for the Next Life, 1966)
11. នាងត្រចើលដោះក្រាល (1966)
12. ព្រះបាទសុរិយោពណ៌ (Prince Suriyopear, 1966)
13. ភ្លើងមរណៈ (Fire of Death, 1966)
14. រន្ទះដាវវេទមន្ត (The Lightning of the Magic Sword, 1966)
15. រសាត់តាមកម្ម (Drifting with Karma, 1966)
16. ខ្ញុំច្រឡំទេពុក (Oh! Sorry, Dad!, 1967)
17. ជួយឪក្មេកផង (1967)
18. តារាភាពយន្តអភ័ព្វ (Unlucky Movie Star, 1967)
19. បិសាចសុវណ្ណគិរី (The Devil of Sovannkiri, 1967)
20. បិសាចឥន្ទ្រីក្រហម (1967)
21. បាតជើងសព្រាត (1967)
22. ប្រវត្តិទូកមាស (1967)
23. ព្រះបាទបទុមរាជា (1967)
24. ស្រីឆ្នាស កញ្ចាស់ខិល កំលោះខូច (1967)
25. អន្ទាក់ប្រាក់ច្រវាក់កាមគុណ (1967)
26. សំពាយជីវិត (1968)
27. ជនកាយសិទ្ធិកន្សែងសិល្ប៍ (1971)
28. ផុតអនាគតរលត់ស្នេហ៍ (1972)
29. សម្បថ ១០០០ពាក្យ (1972)
30. ច្រឡំក្បាល (1973)
31. ផ្កាយព្រឹក (The Morning Star, 1973)

=== Under the pseudonym of Tin Tivea ===
1. ក្រមុំភ្នែក៤ (A Virgin with Four Eyes, 1965)
2. កកក៏បាយ មេម៉ាយក៏ស្រី (Cold Rice Is Still Good to Eat, 1966)
3. កំលោះច្រែសចាប់ (The Old Roué, 1966)
4. កំលោះត្បាញអាយ មេម៉ាយយំយប់
5. កំបោរឡើងតុំ ក្រមុំឡើងខ្លួន
6. ខឹងខាតព្រោះយល់ខុស
7. ខ្ញុំកូនក្រៅខោ (I Am a Bastard)
8. ខ្ញុំមិនយកទេប្តីចាស់ ស្អប់ណាស់ប្តីក្មេង
9. តាចាស់ចង់បានប្រពន្ធក្មេង (An Old Fart Wants to Marry a Young Lady)
10. ធ្វើបាបម្តាយអន្តរាយដល់ខ្លួន
11. នែបងកុំនាំភ្លើង
12. បេះដូងកំលោះ សម្រស់មេម៉ាយ
13. សុំបញ្ចាំប្តីផង
14. ស្នេហាទ័លច្រក (A Love with No Issue)
15. ហ៊ឺហាហិនហោច
16. អាណិតអូនផង
17. អូនចង់តែខាំ អូនខ្ញាំឥឡូវ

=== Translations ===
- L'amour à dos de vache translated from Khmer to French by Christophe Macquet, in Revue Europe, "Écrivains du Cambodge", 81e année, N° 889 / Mai 2003. Republished in Revue bilingue MEET, n°15, Bilingual Khmer/French edition, Porto Rico / Phnom Penh, 2011.
- Love on Cowback, translated from Khmer to French by Christophe Macquet and from French to English by Nick Bozanic, In the Shadow of Angkor: Contemporary Writing From Cambodia, Manoa, University of Hawaii Press (2004).

== Quotes ==
- "I'm just a little farm boy / I'm just a little farm boy / No merchant's son am I / I love my folks, I drink no booze / I smoke some hash, it's true / And honk as loudly as a goose / And am as thoughtless, too." (Love on Cowback)
- "At dawn I rise / My hair untouched by comb or brush / Out under the sun I tan my tush. / Work's not worth the worry / Work'll ruin you, surely!" (Love on Cowback)

== See also ==
- Chuth Khay
- Keng Vannsak
- Khun Srun
- Kong Bunchhoeun
- Soth Polin
