= See Angkor and Die =

1993 Cambodian film by Norodom Sihanouk

- Poster
- Directed by: Norodom Sihanouk
- Written by: Norodom Sihanouk
- Produced by: Norodom Sihanouk
- Starring: San Chariya; Roland Eng
- Release date: 1993
- Running time: 81 minutes
- Country: Cambodia
- Language: Khmer

See Angkor and Die is a 1993 Cambodian romantic drama film directed by Norodom Sihanouk.

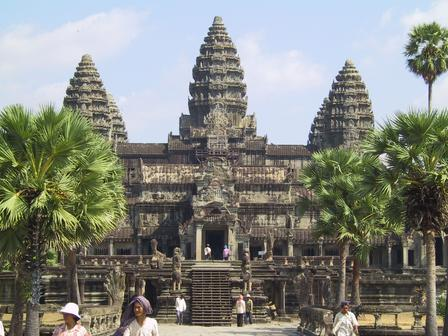
Angkor Wat

== Cast ==
- San Chariya
- Roland Eng
- Mam Kanika
- Sina Than
