= Sok Sreymom =

Cambodian film actress

Sok Sreymom (សុខ ស្រីមុំ) is a Cambodian film star with roles in over 100 films and videos. She now lives in California as an accomplished singer traveling around the US appearing with Khmer bands for the last ten years and is releasing her first American music video. Her life story transitions from slave labor for three and a half years at age five in the fields to top movie star and traveling internationally with King Norodom Sihanouk's entourage then moving to the US.
