= An Ambition Reduced to Ashes =

- Poster
- Directed by: Norodom Sihanouk
- Written by: Norodom Sihanouk
- Produced by: Norodom Sihanouk
- Starring: Keo Kasal, Neary Rathkunthea, Mom Soth
- Cinematography: Prum Mesa
- Release date: 1995
- Running time: 46 minutes
- Country: Cambodia
- Language: Khmer

An Ambition Reduced to Ashes is a 1995 Cambodian short feature drama film written and directed by Norodom Sihanouk, King of Cambodia. The film was made right after his recovery from cancer in Beijing, China.

== Cast ==
- Kong Sophy
- Mom Soth
- Chorn Torn
