= Him Sivorn =

Cambodian singer

- Born: 1970 (age 55–56); Ba Phnom, Prey Veng, Cambodia
- Genres: Cambodian Music (various genres of music)
- Occupation: Singer
- Years active: 1988–present
- Labels: Rasmey Hang Meas Production (1997–present) (2004–present)

Him Sivorn (Khmer: ហ៊ឹម ស៊ីវន; born 1970) is a popular female singer in Cambodia. She was one of the singers who performed at Phnom Penh's Olympic Stadium in celebration of parliamentarian Hun Many being awarded the Gusi Peace Prize in 2015.
