= The Last Days of Colonel Savath =

1995 Cambodian film by Norodom Sihanouk

- Poster
- Directed by: Norodom Sihanouk
- Written by: Norodom Sihanouk
- Produced by: Norodom Sihanouk
- Starring: Kong Sophy; Mom Soth; Chorn Torn
- Release date: 1995
- Running time: 34 minutes
- Country: Cambodia
- Language: Khmer

The Last Days of Colonel Savath is a 1995 Cambodian short film drama directed by Norodom Sihanouk.

== Cast ==
- Kong Sophy
- Mom Soth
- Chorn Torn
