= Nathaniel Popkin =

American writer (born 1969)

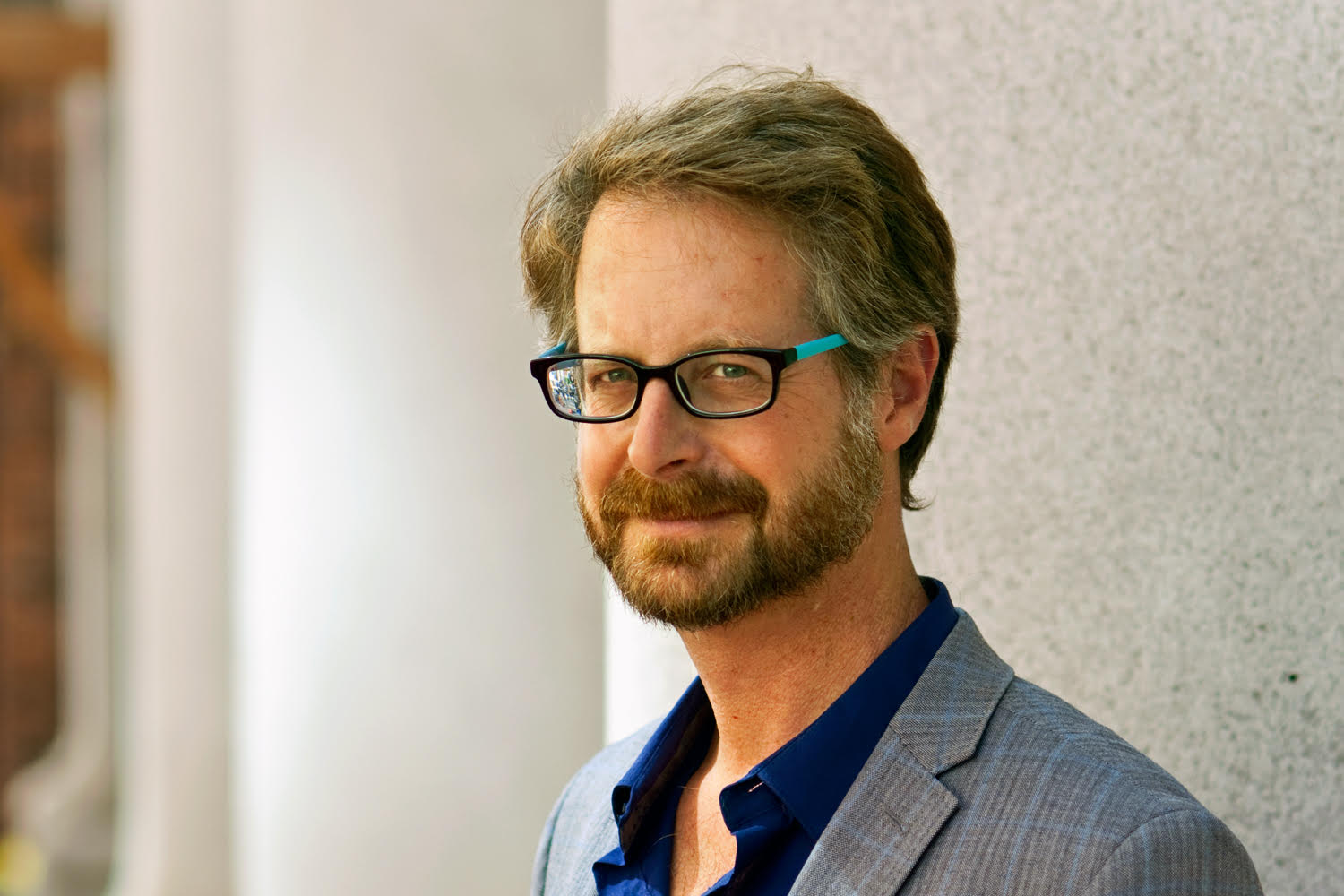
- Born: August 23, 1969 (age 57)
- Education: University of Pennsylvania, University of Pennsylvania School of Design
- Writing career
- Genres: fiction, non-fiction
- Notable works: Everything is Borrowed, Who Will Speak for America?

Nathaniel Popkin (born August 23, 1969) is a Philadelphia-based writer, editor, and historian. He is the author of Song of the City (2002, Basic Books), The Possible City (2008, Camino Books), Lion and Leopard (2013, The Head and The Hand Press), Philadelphia: Finding the Hidden City (2017, Temple University Press), and Everything is Borrowed (2018, New Door Books). He is the co-editor of Who Will Speak for America? (2018, Temple University Press.) He co-founded the Hidden City Daily in 2011.

== Education ==
Popkin received a BA, Philosophy from University of Pennsylvania in 1991 a MCP from University of Pennsylvania School of Design in 1994. He attended Spéos Photographic Institute in Paris in 1998.

== Career ==
After working as an environmental organizer in Michigan, Ohio, and Pennsylvania, Popkin pursued various positions in community development in Philadelphia. In 1999, he began working on a book of reportage, Song of the City: An Intimate History of the American Urban Landscape, published by Four Walls Eight Windows in 2002.

In 2006, he began writing opinion essays for the Philadelphia City Paper, The Philadelphia Inquirer, and PhillySkyline.com, on architecture, history, literature, and comparative urban development. His work in this period asserted a positivist philosophy on Philadelphia and American cities. In 2007, he was named writer in residence of Philadelphia University, where Song of the City was taught to all freshmen as part of the First Year Experience program. In 2008, Popkin was named writer-in-residence again and a new book, The Possible City: Exercises in Dreaming Philadelphia (Camino Books, 2008) was named as 2008-2009 First Year Experience book.

In 2011, Popkin co-founded the Hidden City Daily, a web magazine covering Philadelphia's past, present, and future.

In 2011–12, Popkin served as the guest architecture critic of The Philadelphia Inquirer.

In 2008, Popkin became the writer of Sam Katz's history documentary, “Philadelphia: The Great Experiment,” which broadcasts regionally in installments on Philadelphia's ABC network channel, WPVI-TV. In 2014 and 2015 he won Mid-Atlantic chapter Emmy awards for writing the documentary.

In 2013, Popkin began writing on literary subjects for The Smart Set, with a particular focus on literature on place and global literature in translation.

His third book and first novel, Lion and Leopard, was published in 2013.

In 2014, Popkin became the Fiction Review Editor of the literary journal Cleaver Magazine. That year he began writing essays on literary topics and literary criticism, often of books in translation, and his work has continued to be featured in the Wall Street Journal, Kenyon Review, the Millions, The Rumpus, and LitHub.

Popkin is a member of the National Book Critics Circle and a member of PEN America.

From 2016 to 2018 he was the writer-in-residence at the Athenaeum of Philadelphia.

After the election of Donald J. Trump in November 2016, Popkin co-organized (along with poet Alicia Askenase and novelist Stephanie Feldman) Writers Resist Philadelphia, a day of literary protest January 15, 2017. He and Stephanie Feldman went on to edit Who Will Speak for America? a collection of work from 40 writers, poets, and artists responding to the Trump administration.

In 2017, Popkin co-authored, along with Joseph E.B. Elliott and Peter Woodall, Philadelphia: Finding the Hidden City.

Popkin's novel Everything is Borrowed was published by New Door Books in Spring 2018.

In 2018, Popkin wrote the documentary film Sisters in Freedom, which was produced by History Making Productions.

In 2018, Popkin began writing extensively about the ecological crisis. His work, "The Gun to Our Heads", was published by Public Books in October. The New York Times published a follow-up in December 2018 naming this new era the "Age of Loss".
