= SIPAR =

Sipar (French: Soutien à l’initiative privée pour l’aide à la reconstruction) is a French NGO working towards the reconstruction of Cambodia. The NGO's mission is to improve education and fight illiteracy. The organisation is considered to have played a key role in the evolution of educational policies in Cambodia.

== History ==
Sipar was founded in 1982 in Versailles, France. It opened its first classes at the refugee camp in Phanat Nikhom district, Thailand, with the goal of aiding the integration of refugees from Cambodia, Vietnam, and Laos to France. In 1991, Sipar started operations in Cambodia. After years of experience in working in different Cambodian provinces, Sipar started operating in the entire country, helping improve the education of kids and the literacy of kids and adults by promoting books.

As of December 2022, Sipar's publishing house has published more than 250 fiction and non-fiction books and 3.5 million copies since 2002.
