= Peng Phan =

Cambodian film actress

Peng Phan is a Cambodian film actress. She has been featured in three films by Rithy Panh: Rice People, One Evening After the War and The Burnt Theatre.

In her feature film debut, Rice People, Phan portrayed Om, the mentally unstable wife of a farmer and the mother of seven daughters, all struggling during a single rice-planting season.

In 2005's The Burnt Theatre, she portrayed herself, or a character who was an actress named Peng Phan who suffered survivor guilt and psychosomatic illness.

== Filmography ==
Year	Title	Role	Notes
1994	Rice People	Yim Om, mother	
1995	Femme de passions		TV movie
1998	One Evening After the War	Srey Poeuv's Mother	
1999	One Step on a Mine, It's All Over		
2002	Newsman	Vannah	TV movie
2005	The Burnt Theatre	Herself	Documentary
2012	Still I Strive	Herself	Documentary
