= My Village at Sunset =

1992 Cambodian film by Norodom Sihanouk

- Poster
- Directed by: Norodom Sihanouk
- Written by: Norodom Sihanouk
- Produced by: Norodom Sihanouk
- Starring: Norodom Sihamoni; San Chariya
- Release date: 18 February 1992
- Running time: 63 minutes
- Country: Cambodia
- Language: Khmer

My Village at Sunset is a 1992 Cambodian romantic drama film directed by Norodom Sihanouk.

== Plot ==
Following the 1991 peace agreements, Dr Sieha returned from Paris to volunteer at a clinic in Siem Reap. He and Dara, a teacher in the village, performed surgical operations on patients injured by land mines. Sieha stayed in a house with Dara, a local teacher. Her husband, Sok, is disabled as a result of the war. Dara tried to court Sieha. Meanwhile, Sieha married Neari, a nurse. After getting some of her anger out of her system, Dara moved to Phnom Penh. Neari and her sister, who works in a factory producing prostheses, agree to take care of Sok. Despite this, Sok commits suicide. Sieha, grief-stricken, decides to join a de-mining team, and dies on a mission.

== Cast ==
- San Chariya
- Norodom Sihamoni
- Ros Sarocun
