= Mānoa (journal) =

American literary journal

- Discipline: Literature
- Language: English
- Edited by: Frank Stewart

Publication details
- History: 1989-present
- Publisher: University of Hawaii Press (United States)
- Frequency: Semiannually

Standard abbreviations
- ISO 4: Mānoa

Indexing
- ISSN: 1045-7909 (print); 1527-943X (web)
- JSTOR: 10457909
- OCLC no.: 42786100

Links
- Journal homepage

Mānoa (subtitled A Pacific Journal of International Writing) is a literary journal that includes American and international fiction, poetry, artwork, interviews, and essays, including memoirs. A notable feature of each issue is original translations of contemporary work from Asian and Pacific nations, selected for each issue by a special guest editor. Mānoa, meaning 'vast and deep' in the Hawaiian language, presents both traditional and contemporary writings from the entire Pacific Rim. Mānoa is published semiannually by the University of Hawaii Press and was established in 1989.

Each issue also bears an ISBN and is marketed as a book in its own right.

== Editors ==
The journal was established by Robert Shapard and Frank Stewart (poet) (University of Hawaii). The inaugural volume, a double issue, appeared in 1989. Shapard served as principal editor and Stewart as associate editor for the first three issues, both coedited the next three, and then Stewart became principal editor in 1995.

== Content ==
Volumes have featured work from such places as the People's Republic of China, Tibet, Nepal, Taiwan, Japan, Korea, Okinawa, Viet Nam, Cambodia, Indonesia, Malaysia, Singapore, Papua New Guinea, New Zealand, Australia, French Polynesia, the Pacific Islands, India, Pakistan, and Bangladesh, as well as Canada, Mexico, Pacific South America, Russian Far East, and Cascadia.

Works in the journal have been recognized by the editors of such anthologies as Best American Short Stories, Best American Poetry, Best American Essays, Prize Stories: The O. Henry Awards, and Pushcart Prize.

The journal's first electronic edition appeared in 2000 on Project MUSE. Back issues of the journal became available in the JSTOR digital archive in November 2008.

== See also ==
- List of literary magazines
