= Roland Eng =

Cambodian politician

Roland Eng is a Cambodian politician, former member of parliament, Minister of Tourism, and Cambodian ambassador to Malaysia, Singapore, and Thailand. He was elected as a member of parliament for Kampot province during the first term of the Royal Government of Cambodia. The elections were held under UN supervision (UNTAC). Ge was simultaneously appointed as the first Minister of Tourism, and then head of mission in Thailand, Malaysia, Singapore, and New York.

== Early life ==
At the age of 12, Eng was sent to France to study. Then, there was a coup by General Lon Nol in 1970. The coup leaders kept his father under house arrest. When the Khmer Rouge invaded Phnom Penh, Eng's parents, five sisters and two brothers were killed.
