= An Apostle of Non-Violence =

1997 Cambodian film by Norodom Sihanouk

- Directed by: Norodom Sihanouk
- Written by: Norodom Sihanouk
- Produced by: Norodom Sihanouk
- Starring: Khai Prasith; Saroeun Sophirom; Kong Sophy
- Cinematography: Prum Mesa
- Production company: Khemara Pictures
- Release date: March 29, 1997 (SEABFF)
- Running time: 46 minutes
- Country: Cambodia
- Language: Khmer

An Apostle of Non-Violence (French: Un apôtre de la non-violence) is a 1997 Cambodian short feature film written, produced, and directed by King Norodom Sihanouk. Starring Khai Prasith, the film tells the story of a Buddhist monk trying to preach non-violence to opposing groups of a civil war. King Norodom wrote the film's screenplay in 1994, with production underway by 1996.

An Apostle of Non-Violence was screened on March 29, 1997 for the opening ceremony of the 1st Southeast Asian Biennial Film Festival (French: Biennale des Cinémas et de l'Image de l'Asie du Sud-Est), hosted by Cambodia, and it has since been released on DVD.

== Plot ==
A Buddhist monk tries to preach non-violence to the Khmum-Chachak rebels and the National Army, who are in the midst of a civil war that can dangerously affect innocent civilians.

== Cast ==
- Khai Prasith
- Saroeun Sophirom
- Kong Sophy
- Chorn Torn
