= Ampor Tevi =

Cambodian actress (born 1970)

- Born: Song Ampor; July 17, 1970 (age 56); Khmer Republic
- Other names: Ampor Tevy, Ampor Devi, Ompor Tevy, Ompor Thevy,
- Occupation: Actress
- Years active: 1987–

Ampor Tevi (Khmer: អម្ពរ ទេវី, romanized: Ǎmpô Tevi; born July 17, 1970) is a Cambodian actress active in 1990s. Within the span of her career she has starred in numerous films, from movies to musical skits. Her career started in 1988 with her paired actor Sam Vityea. After Sam Vityea died that year, Ampor Tevi was often paired with fellow actor, also famous at the time, Tep Rindaro.

== Biography ==
Ampor Tevi was born in 1970. She is the eldest child in the family among five other siblings. She finished the 12th Grade at Bak Touk College of Fine Arts in 1989. Her debut film was released in 1988 co-starring Sam Vityea, her ex co-star. She then married Pich Phirun who was also an actor from her generation in October 1992.

== Career ==
After marriage, Tevi continued to act for more movies mostly with her co-star Tep Rindaro. Remarkably, her popularity went from just a regular movie star to a super movie star in just a few years. Every new movie released locally and overseas Ampor Tevi was a part of, and she was always the main character of the movie or music video. Everybody began to know her mostly as a playful and pretty young girl.

Cambodia was not completely peaceful in early 1990s. Wars were still going on in some places in the country. Over all Cambodian population were still very poor and needy, so Khmer entertainment productions and performing arts were not in Cambodians' minds at the time. Khmer movies were mostly sold overseas to few Cambodians who fled the country in early 1980s. Khmer cinematography and film productions were very primitive. So, Khmer movie productions were not sophisticated enough to compete with foreign movies from Thailand, India and Hong Kong. Local Cambodians would watch Thai, Indian or Chinese movies rather than Khmer movies. Only Cambodians who lived overseas watched Khmer movies or music videos because they missed Cambodia and that was the only way they could see Cambodia. That had adversely affected local Khmer film productions dramatically that most of Khmer movie production companies had to go out of business or stopped producing movies. By 1994, due to the governments demand, the fairly new Cambodian film industry came once again to an end leaving most actors like Ampor Tevi herself starring in karaoke videos up until the early 2000s. Despite her popularity, Ampor Tevi had very few opportunities to act and began to lose her concentration. In 2001 Fai Sam Ang, the predominant movie director decided to create the well-known Khmer folktale story: Kone Puos Keng Kong (The Snake King's Child). Ampor Tevi was selected to act as Neang Ni, the main female character of the movie together with Tep Rindaro, Pich Chan Boremei and Winai Kraibutr a Thai leading actor who was also part of the movie. After the filming of Kone Puos Keng Kong, Ampor Tevi decided to leave Cambodia for USA, seeking for a better opportunity. Kon Pous King Kang was the last movie of her career.

== Partial filmography ==
Year	Movie	Role	Other notes
1988	"Snae Hike Jrek Vinean"		starring Sam Vityea and young Ampor Tevy, 18 at the time.
1989	Mae Ombao Klaeng Kai		
1990	Ahtgombang Kech Soniya		Co-starring Tep Rindaro
1990	Tuk Pnek Haek Trung		
1990	Bomram Kromum		
1990	Som Hauy Loke Pdei		
1991	Bong'aem Chivit		
1991	Srotop Pka Prul		
1991	Bongáem Jivit		
1991	Jumrok Snae		
1992	Cham Bong Komloss Sen		
1992	Kdam Srae		
1992	Pich Min Tonn Chnai		
1992	Kat Besdong Deumbey Bong	Pisey	
1992	Kromum Leak Kluon		Co-starring Som Dara together with Ampor Tevy for the first time
1992	Somdei Jong Krouy		Angkorwat Film 47 directed by Mao Ayuth
1992	Jam Bong Komlos Sen		
1993	Chnam Oun 16		
1993	Kakey		
1993	Pov Malis Lea		
1993	Kromum Besdong Daek		
1993	Preah Vesandor		
1993	Sronos Klen Srae Maóm		
1993	Rehu Jap Jan		
1993	Jan Greufa		
1993	Moranak Meada		
1993	Tam Tonn Jonn Kaeng		
1993	Ondat Dos Chaúng		
1993	Propun Kmouch Nei Snaeha Knhom		
1993	Sak Meul Sen		
1993	Kach Nas Kul Nas		
1993	Sman Ta Kron		
1994	Jeung Mek Dach Sroyal		
1994	Jong Srol		
2001	The Snake King's Child		
2016	Tek Jet Mday Sromay Tmey		
