= Pisith Pilika =

Cambodian ballet dancer and actress (1965–1999)

Pisith Pilika ពិសិដ្ឋ ពីលីកា
- Born: Oak Eap Pili; 4 February 1965; Svay Rieng province, Cambodia
- Died: 6 July 1999 (aged 34); Phnom Penh, Cambodia
- Years active: 1979–1998
- Spouse: Khai Praseth (divorced)

Pisith Pilika (Khmer: ពិសិដ្ឋ ពីលីកា; 4 February 1965 – 6 July 1999), was a Cambodian ballet dancer and actress. Born Oak Eap Pili (Khmer: ឱក អៀបពីលី), Pilika appeared in hundreds of films and thousands of karaoke videos from the 1980s through the 1990s. Her career was brought to a premature end when she was murdered in broad daylight at O'Russey Market in Phnom Penh. Though the crime was one of the most high-profile killings in Cambodia's recent history, no suspects have ever been identified or arrested.

== Early life ==
Piseth Pilika was born to Oak Harl and Meng Mony in Svay Rieng province. Her father was a professor who taught French at the University of Korokosol. She had two sisters, Divina and Daro; she herself being the oldest.

After both of her parents died under the Khmer Rouge, Pilika and her two sisters were raised by their uncle. They changed their names to Sao Pili, Sao Divina, and Sao Daro (respectively) after their uncle, Sao Piseth. Sao Daro, the youngest sister, died later on, leaving behind the two sisters. Pili began to study Cambodian cultural dance in 1980, supported by her aunt, Meng Sonali, a teacher at the School of Fine Arts. She completed her studies in 1988 and continued to work for the school as a lead dancer. Because of her perceived talent and beauty, she had begun to gain popularity. She was invited to star in her own film called Sromorl Anthakal (Shadow of Darkness) by Wat Phnom Productions. By that time she had become a well-known figure in Cambodia. In 1989, she changed her name to Piseth Pilika.

== Personal life ==
Pilika had been very involved in filmmaking, through which she came to meet Khai Praseth, also a well-known actor. The two played together in several films and music videos. They were married in 1990. In 1992, their first child, Kai Seth Lesak, was born. Pilika starred in more than 60 films and was in numerous advertisements. Apart from making films, she was also very active in stage performance. During her lifetime, she performed throughout Asia, Europe, and the United States.

== Death ==
On 6 July 1999, Pilika was shot by an unidentified male assailant while shopping at O'Russey Market in Phnom Penh. A seven-year-old niece was also wounded in the shooting. Pilika lay in critical condition in a hospital bed until 13 July 1999 6:30 am (UTC+7), when she died. Her funeral attracted 10,000 mourners—one of the largest-attended ceremonies in recent Cambodian history.

In October 1999, following Pilika's murder, the French magazine L'Express claimed that the actress' diary recounted a love affair with Cambodian Prime Minister Hun Sen, and pointed to Bun Rany, Hun Sen's wife, as responsible for arranging the shooting. The magazine also claimed that on her deathbed the actress had named Bun Rany to several people. Bun Rany quickly denounced these charges, and announced that she would press charges against L'Express for defamation. The magazine responded by saying it had additional proof that it would produce in court if the threatened legal action went ahead. The alleged additional evidence included witnesses, documents, business papers, and personal objects of Hun Sen, which they said would prove the prime minister was involved in an affair with Pilika and that his wife had her killed out of jealousy. L'Express journalist Alain Louyot said the diary itself had been verified through handwriting and fingerprint analysis. No charges were brought against L'Express.

The murder of Pilika remains unsolved and no suspects have been identified. Kek Galabru, president of the Cambodian League for the Promotion and Defence of Human Rights (LICADHO), described the lack of progress in the case as yet another example of the problem of impunity in Cambodia. In January 2003 Piseth Pilika: A True and Horrible Story was published, which contained extracts from the slain star's alleged personal diaries, in which she details an illicit love affair with a high-ranking official and threats against her life by the official's jealous wife. The book sold well until it was taken from shelves by undercover and uniformed police officers, giving further credence to an alleged coverup.

== Filmography ==
- Smomoul Antaka (1989)
- Beisach Kramum (1991)
- Sranah Klen Srae Morm (1992)
- Chan Greoufa (1993)
- Chhnam Oun 16 (1993)
- Reahu Chap Chan (1993)
- Preah Vesandar (1993)
- Pech Min Toan Chhnai (1993)
- Pov Malis Lea (1993)
- Pramat Pramaong (1994)
- Neang Badaja (1994)
- Somlang Tror Khmer (1994)
- Bopha Puos Vaek (1994)
- Phka Angkearbuos (1995)
- Moronameata (1995)
- Picheyvongsa (1996)
- Baksa Jak Meik (1996)
- Proloeng Areak Oun Teak Nissay (1997)

== Live performances and documentaries ==
- Robam Tep Monorum (1986)
- Robam Reamke (1996)
- Hello Ozone Live Interview (Pilika talks about moments of her life such as her divorce from former-Cambodian actor Kai Prosith and the death of her parents.) (1997)
- Akasa Neak Srey Pisith Pilika (History/Memories of Pisith Pilika) (1999)
- Pisith Pilika Assassination (Who Killed Pisith Pilika) (2000)

== Music videos ==
- 1.Bomram Kromum (1990) with Kai Prasith
- 2.Tov Leng Aranh (1991) CM Musical
- 3.Robam Kane (1992) from Sronos Klen Srae Maóm
- 4.June Po Politakam Angkorwat (1992)
- 5.Pka Reek Bang Sluk (1992) from Preah Vesandor
- 6.Tomnuonh Neang Metrei (1992) from Preah Vesandor
- 7.Preah Vesandor (1992)
- 8.Pka Euy Pka Putrea (1992) from Chan Greofa
- 9 Kompleang Anuksavary (1992) from Chnam Oun 16
- 10.Chouk Rath Meas Bong (1992)
- 11.Oh Duong Dara (1993)
- 12.Sompors Neary Khmer (Preah Vihear vol 8:1994)
- 13.Sronoss Dey Khmer (Preap Meas vol 8:1994)
- 14.Omtuke Rosai Rosat (Preap Meas vol 8:1994)
- 15.Kae Chaet Chol Chnam (Preah Vihear vol 2:1996)
- 16.Somlung Saek Meas (Preah Vihear vol 3:1996)
- 17.Jompa Koss Thmey (Preah Vihear vol 3:1996)
- 18.Mae Pteas Lek Muoy (Number 1 Housewife) (Chlangden vol.5:1996)
- 19.Bau Pkay Nao Tae Reas (Preah Vihear vol 9:1997)
- 20.Komrong Pka Puong (Preah Vihear vol 18:1997)
- 21.Kromum Reus Pdey (Rasmey Hang Meas vol 13:1997)
- 22.Yup Menh Pleang Tum (Rasmey Hang Meas vol.13:1997)
- 23.Anuksavary Angkor (Golden CD vol 4:1998)
- 24.Reatrey Saen Monorum (Angkorwat vol 21:1998)
- 25.Luoch Snae Duong Chan (Rasmey Neakreach 1998)

== See also ==
- Kong Bunchhoeun
- Hok Lundy
- Heng Pov
- Tat Marina
- Touch Sunnix
