= One Evening After the War =

- Film poster
- Directed by: Rithy Panh
- Written by: Rithy Panh; Ève Deboise
- Produced by: Jacques Bidou
- Starring: Chea Lyda Chan
- Cinematography: Christophe Pollock
- Edited by: Marie-Christine Rougerie
- Music by: Marc Marder
- Distributed by: Compagnie Méditerranéenne de Cinéma; Cara M
- Release date: 19 May 1998 (France)
- Running time: 108 minutes
- Countries: Cambodia; France
- Language: Khmer

One Evening After the War (Khmer: រាត្រីមួយក្រោយសង្គ្រាម, romanized: Réatrei Muŏy Kraôy Sângkréam; French: Un soir après la guerre) is a 1998 Cambodian drama film, directed and co-written by Rithy Panh. Panh directed this neo-realist French-Cambodian social drama set amid Southeast Asian poverty and the Cambodian underworld.

The film premiered in the Un Certain Regard section at the 1998 Cannes Film Festival.

== Cast ==
- Chea Lyda Chan as Srey Poeuv
- Narith Roeun as Savannah
- Peng Phan as Srey Poeuv's mother
- Ratha Keo as Maly
- Srangath Kheav as Mute child
- Mol Sovannak as Phal

== Release ==
One Evening After the War made its world premiere in the Un Certain Regard section at the 1998 Cannes Film Festival. It opened for general release in France on 16 December 1998.
