= Vandy Kaonn =

Cambodian history and literature analyst

Vandy Kaonn (born in 1942) is a Khmer history and literature analyst and author of various books of philosophy, sociology, politics and history in Khmer and French. Kaonn studied sociology at the Sorbonne and graduated in 1970. He is now well known to most Cambodians from the Khmer History programme on RFI (Radio France International en cambodgien).
