= Rice People =

- The DVD cover.
- Directed by: Rithy Panh
- Screenplay by: Ève Deboise; Rithy Panh
- Based on: No Harvest But a Thorn by Shahnon Ahmad
- Produced by: Jacques Bidou; Pierre-Alain Meier
- Starring: Peng Phan; Mom Soth; Chhim Naline
- Cinematography: Jacques Bouquin
- Edited by: Andrée Davanture; Marie-Christine Rougerie
- Music by: Jean-Claude Brisson; Marc Marder
- Distributed by: Facets Video
- Release date: May 1994 (France)
- Running time: 125 minutes
- Country: Cambodia
- Language: Khmer

Rice People (Khmer: អ្នកស្រែ, romanized: 'nâk Srê [neak srae]) is a 1994 Cambodian drama film directed and co-written by Rithy Panh. Adapted from the 1966 novel Ranjau Sepanjang Jalan (No Harvest But a Thorn), by Malaysian author Shahnon Ahmad, which is set in the Malaysian state of Kedah, Rice People is the story of a rural family in post-Khmer Rouge Cambodia, struggling to bring in a single season's rice crop. It was filmed in the Cambodian village of Kamreang, in the Kien Svay and Boeung Thom areas of Kandal Province near Phnom Penh, on the banks of the Mekong River. The cast features both professional and non-professional actors.

The film premiered in the main competition at the 1994 Cannes Film Festival and was submitted to the 67th Academy Awards, the first time a Cambodian film had been submitted as a possible nominee for Best Foreign Language Film.

== Plot ==
In Cambodia, where families were torn apart in the Khmer Rouge's genocidal bid to transform the country into an agrarian utopia, it is ironic that people have lost touch with the land. For a generation of children, the rice comes not from the ground, but from a sack, offloaded from the back of a United Nations relief truck.

So it is in these uncertain times, that a Cambodian family is attempting to grow rice. The father, Pouev, is concerned that the family's plot of land is shrinking, and he might not be able to grow a big enough crop.

The mother, Om, is worried for her husband, and her worst fears are confirmed when Poeuv steps on a poisonous thorn, and then, after a protracted period of being bedridden, dies of infection.

Om is unable to handle the pressure of being the head of the family, nor does she have the strength to tend to the rice fields. She turns to alcohol and gambling and is eventually locked up for her mental illness.

Responsibility for bringing in the crop and raising her six sisters falls on the oldest girl, Sakha.

== Cast ==
- Peng Phan as Om
- Mom Soth as Poeuv
- Chhim Naline as Sakha
- Va Simorn as Sokhoeun
- Sophy Sodany as Sokhon
- Muong Danyda as Sophon
- Pen Sopheary as Sophoeun
- Proum Mary as Sophat
- Sam Kourour as Sopheap

== Release ==
Rice People premiered at the 1994 Cannes Film Festival in the main competition for the Palme d'Or, a prize that went to Pulp Fiction. The film had its North American premiere at the Toronto International Film Festival.

The film was submitted to the 67th Academy Awards as a possible nominee for Best Foreign Language Film, the first time a Cambodian film had been submitted to the Academy Awards.

== See also ==
- List of submissions to the 67th Academy Awards for Best Foreign Language Film
- List of Cambodian submissions for the Academy Award for Best Foreign Language Film
