= Kong Bunchhoeun =

Khmer writer, novelist, songwriter, filmmaker, painter and poet

- Born: Kong Bunnchoeun; 18 October 1939; Battambang, Cambodia
- Died: 17 April 2016 (aged 76); Norway
- Occupations: Author; poet; novelist; songwriters; movie director
- Spouse: Uch Kolab
- Children: 9
- Writing career
- Language: Khmer
- Period: 21st century (2000-present)
- Genre: Human rights
- Notable works: The Fate of Tat Marina; Love Till The End

Kong Bunchhoeun (Khmer: គង្គ ប៊ុនឈឿន; 18 October 1939 – 17 April 2016) was a Khmer writer, novelist, songwriter, filmmaker, painter, and poet. Bunchhoeun composed more than 200 songs between the 1960s and the 1970s and contributed to “Golden Age” of films and songs in Cambodia. He composed a number of hit songs for Cambodia's greatest singer of all time, Sinn Sisamouth and the contemporary vocalist and singer Preap Sovath. Most of his work touched upon his hometown of Battambang, earning him the pen name “Master Poet of Sangkae River”.

Bunchhoeun composed a number of poems and novels when Cambodian literature flourished in the 1960s, and he survived the Khmer regime partly as he wrote less towards the fall of Phnom Penh to the Khmer Rouge. Currently, there is no real reliable record as to how many novels and songs he might have written. Bunchhoeun's most well-known work of literature, The Fate of Tat Marina, published in 2000, is a loosely fictionalised account of his niece Tat Marina’s affair with Svay Sitha, an undersecretary of state at the Council of Ministers, and the subsequent acid attack that left her suffering ghastly wounds. Marina identified Sitha’s wife, Khourn Sophal, as her attacker.

An arrest warrant for Sophal was signed, but she was never arrested. As Bunchhoeun saw Marina’s story as an opportunity to speak out, he received death threats, fled to Thailand after 2000, and later sought an asylum in Norway in 2005. Bunchhoeun continued writing in self-exile, publishing at least 10 books from abroad.

== Biography ==
He was born to Kong Chhin from Takéo Province and Mor Phoeng from Battambang province. His father was a Khmer-French translator and his mother a housewife. His elder brother was Kong Bunchhorm who died due to an illness before the Khmer Rouge regime. In 1957 when he was 18 years old, he had to give up his studies because of poverty. His father liked reading and collecting newspapers especially Extrème-ORIENT, which was published in Prey Nokor, present-day Ho Chi Minh City. Both his father and mother fell sick and died at different periods of time. Bunchhoeun continued to do odd jobs as a construction worker, a street vendor, and others to make a living while writing his novels. He failed at first to convince book stores to publish his novels until he met a friend who told him that a film production company was looking for him to buy the license of his novel "Woman Murderer" and landed a job as a story writer at the company. However, in 1963, he was jailed for 6 months in Battambang province for a novel "Hell Mansion" which he wrote a year before but got published 6 months earlier, criticising a senior government official who worked in the Royal Palace, had mistresses and engaged in corrupt activities. He was charged with and convicted of defamation. After leaving prison, he married Uch Kolab who also had the same passion in art and writing. Again in 1970, he was jailed for another 15 days for his novel "Where is its future?" which criticised the then political system. He and his family continued to live in Phnom Penh, and he kept on doing several jobs such as writing news articles, songs, movie scripts; directing movies, and painting to support his family financially.

== Living under the Khmer Rouge ==
When the Khmer Rouge soldiers took over Phnom Penh on April 17, 1975, the whole city was evacuated. He, his wife, and his 5 children were forcibly moved to Sandan, Kampong Thom province. Five months into the regime, he and his wife were almost executed by the Khmer Rouge cadres who found his 16 movie films he hid inside his pillow. The movie called "Four-eyed Face" was never screened. Accused of being a CIA agent, he and his wife were later saved by travelling senior Khmer Rouge cadres who had read his novels before and told the executioner that his novels depicted class struggle and supported the poor class. They were freed but later were imprisoned in a Khmer Rouge security prison camp for 5 months. He used his painting skill to survive in the prison camp with his wife because the Khmer Rouge cadres loved to have their pictures painted.

== Illness and death ==
Bunchhoeun spent many days in hospital in Norway, succumbing to cancer on 17 April 2016. He is survived by his wife, Uch Kolab and several of his children residing in Europe. His only wish to have his urn placed near Sangkae River where he sat and wrote his novels in his younger years was granted by the mayor of Battambang. The mayor was quoted as saying that Bunchhoeun's memorial statue may also be constructed by the Battambang authorities provided that the residents supported such a move.

== Discography ==
- កូនស្រីអ្នកនេសាទ (1974)
- ជ្រោះពេជ្រចិន្តា (Unknown)
- សែនស្តាយថ្ពាល់ស្តាំ (Unknown)
- "អនុស្សាវរីយ៍ខ្នងភ្នំសំពៅ" (1973)
- "ស្ពានអូរតាគី" (1973)
- "ជំនោរប៉ៃលិន" (Unknown)
- "រំដួលដងស្ទឹងសង្កែ/Romdual Dong Steung Songkae" (1974)
- "ភ្នំធំទ្រនំស្នេហ៍ចាស់/Phnom Thom Tronom Shae Chas" (Unknown)
- "សែនឈឺចិត្ត/Sen Chheu Chet" (1973)
- "ស្នាមក្រេមជាប់ថ្ពាល់/Snam Kream Chuop Thpuol" (Unknown)
- "ទំនួញហ្គីតាមាស/Tomnunh Gita Meas" (1973)
- "លាហើយស៊ូម៉ាត្រា/Lea Heoy Somatra" (Unknown)
- "សម្រស់នាងចែកទូកដរ/Somros Neang Chev Touk Dor" (Unknown)
- "កូនស្រីអ្នកនេសាទ /Kuon Srey Neak Nesat" (Unknown)
- "អារសាច់ជូនម្តាយ/Ar Sach Chuon Mdai" (1968)
- "ម្លប់ដូងទី១០ /Mlop Dong ti Dop" (1973)
- "ចម្រៀងមរណៈ /Chomreang Moronak" (1973)
- "សម្លេងចាប ប្រាប់ស្នេហ៍ចាស់ /Chomreang Chap Prap Snae Chas" (1972)
- "រាហ៊ូចាប់ចន្ទ /Kuon Srey Neak Nesat" (1973)
- "ភ្លេងមច្ចុរាជ /Pleng Machoreach" (1973)
- "បងដើរកាត់ភ្លៀង /Bong Der Kat Pleang" (1973)
- "ស្ពានឈើអភ័ព្វ /Spean Chhue Aphorp" (1973)
- "ស្រណោះផ្កាក្ទម្ព /Somros Phka Khtom" (1973)
- "មេឃាភ្នំពេញ តារាបាត់ដំបង /Mekhea Phnom Penh Dara Battambang" (1973)
- "រសស្នេហ៍ឧត្តម /Ruon Snae Oudom" (1968)

== Translations ==
- Une mystérieuse passagère translated from Khmer to French by Christophe Macquet, in Revue Europe, "Écrivains du Cambodge", 81e année, N° 889 / Mai 2003. Republished in Revue bilingue MEET, n°15, Bilingual Khmer/French edition, Porto Rico / Phnom Penh, 2011.
- A Mysterious Passenger, translated from Khmer to French by Christophe Macquet and from French to English by Marie-Christine Garneau and Theo Garneau, In the Shadow of Angkor: Contemporary Writing From Cambodia, Manoa, University of Hawaii Press (2004).

== See also ==
- Chuth Khay
- Hak Chhay Hok
- Khun Srun
- Preap Sovath
- Ros Serey Sothea
- Sinn Sisamouth
- Soth Polin
- Tat Marina
