= List of Cambodian films 1955–1975 =

This is an incomplete, chronological list of films produced in the Khmer language between 1955 and 1975.

The Golden Age of Khmer Cinema was a period when Khmer films could compete with other international films in terms of standards and quality. Unique to this era is the union of music and film featuring Cambodia's most talented actors and singers. As nearly every film produced in this era is accompanied by at least one song from Sinn Sisamouth, Ros Sereysothea or other singers of the era. Between 1965 - 1975, at least 300 films were produced and screened throughout the nation's theatres. It ended abruptly in April 1975 with the rise of the Khmer Rouge.

== 1950s ==
Title	Director	Actors	Genre	Notes
1957
Anuksavary Krung Kep				
Dan Prean Labass Prich				
1958
Neang Badaja				

== 1960–66 ==
Title	Director	Actors	Genre	Notes
1960
Kapea Prumajarey Srey Darakut	Sun Bun Ly			Original title: ការពារព្រហម្មចារី
1961
Runteas Kruosa	Ly Bun Yim	Ly Bun Yim, San Mary		
1962
Birds of Paradise	Marcel Camus	Narie Hem		
Kbone Jivit		Nor Rithya, Dy Saveth	Drama	Original title: ក្បូនជីវិត; Dy Saveths' first film.
Kla Krohem	Ly Bun Yim			
Kolap Pailin		Chea Yuthon, Dy Saveth	Romance	
Lea Hauy Duong Dara	Tea Lim Kun	Nor Rithya, Dy Saveth		
1963
Jet Mdai	Yvon Hem	Meas Som el, Saom Vansodany	Drama	The earliest existing Khmer film.
Kmouch Cheun	Ly Bun Yim		Horror	
Onlong Veasna		Dy Saveth	Drama	Original title: ចន្ទ្រាដីខ្មែរ
Phnom Kyoll Kompull		Yi Ki Len, Keo Montha		
Rosat Taam Kyoll	Narie Hem	Chea Yuthon, Narie Hem		
1964
Kong Kam Kong Keo	Biv Chhay Lieng	Chea Yuthon and Y Kim Sua	Folktale	Original title: កងកម្ម កងកែវ; Y Kim Sua died while making this film. Due to her eye tragedy when performing a scene in the movie, this film was never released; But instead, it was written as a novel.
Chantrea Dey Khmer		Kim Nova	Drama	Original title: ចន្ទ្រាដីខ្មែរ
Kmouch Chao	Ly Bun Yim	Ly Bun Yim	Horror	
Krong Sopamith		Kong Som Eun		
Prasat Neang Kmao		Kong Som Eun, Keo Montha		
Preah Moha Monkaline		Kim Nova		
Puuje 1 Truoy 2		Chea Yuthon, Kim Nova		
Sakarak Bopha	Narie Hem	Narie Hem		
Sophat	Nor Rithya	Nor Rithya, Saom Vansodany		
Veasna Neang Rumduol		Nor Rithya, Dy Saveth		
1966
Apsara	Norodom Sihanouk	Nhiek Tioulong, Saksi Sbong, Princess Norodom Buppha Devi, Prince Sisowath Chivan Monirak	Romantic drama	First feature-length and color film by Norodom Sihanouk, Cambodia's head of state and former king

- Cambodian films of 1965
- Cambodian films of 1967
- Cambodian films of 1968
- Cambodian films of 1969
- Cambodian films of 1970
- Cambodian films of 1971
- Cambodian films of 1972
- Cambodian films of 1973
- Cambodian films of 1974

== See also ==
- List of Khmer Soap Operas
- List of Khmer entertainment companies
- List of Khmer film actors
- List of Khmer film directors
