= List of Cambodian films of 1972 =

Cambodian films move toward the modern genre. This is a list of films produced in Cambodia in 1972. Of the 39 films listed, five films exist today, two have been remade, and 32 have not yet been remade.

== Highest-grossing ==
The ten highest-grossing films at the Cambodian box office in 1972 were:

1972 rank	Title	Notes
1.	Orn Euy Srey Orn	
2.	Dav Bakdong Meas	
3.	Panhjapor Tevi	
4.	Kompull Boros Mok 2	
5.	Ream Chbong Yeung	
6.	Chek Deth	
7.	The Snake Kings Wife Part 2	
8.	Teav Aek	
9.	Peil Dael Truv Yum	
10.	Neang Phat Cheay	

Title	Director	Cast	Genre	Notes
1972
Ah Lev Ah Vek		Chea Yuthon, Vichara Dany		Remade in 2004
Andauk See Trokuon	Pek Sompan	Chea Yuthon, Saom Vansodany	Legendary	Not yet remade
Bopha Angkor	Dy Saveth	Yang Chin, Dy Saveth	Action	Present existence
Bong Kos Hauy Oun		Vichara Dany	Drama	Not yet remade
Chek Deth	Yvon Hem	Kong Som Eun, Vichara Dany	Legendary	Not yet remade
Chantavong Nung Neang Kesor Bopha		Kong Som Eun, Saom Vansodany	Legendary	Not yet remade
Jrolung Sek Meas	Saravuth	Chea Yuthon, Vichara Dany	Legendary	Not yet remade
Dav Bak Dong Meas	So Min Chiv	Vann Vannak, Vichara Dany	Legendary	Not yet remade
Dav Chveng Sdam		Vann Vannak, Vichara Dany	Legendary	Not yet remade
Dav Krung Nung Neang Sovan Sokori		Vann Vannak, Saom Vansodany	Legendary	Not yet remade
Kompull Boros Mok 2	Tat Somang	Kong Som Eun, Vichara Dany	Legendary	Not yet remade
Kone Krok Kmao	Vann Vannak	Vann Vannak, Vichara Dany	Comedy	Not yet remade
Kesor Melea	Ly Nguon Heng	Kong Som Eun, Vichara Dany	Legendary	Not yet remade
Knhom Sauch Hauy Knhom Yum	Tat Somnang and Trente Deux	Kong Som Eun, Vichara Dany	Drama	Not yet remade
Konsaeng Lohet	Ly You Sreang	Vann Vannak, Vichara Dany	Legendary	Not yet remade
Lea Oun Tov Chbang		Kong Som Eun, BSaom Vansodany	Drama	Not yet remade
Lum On Pka Sla	Chan Nary	Kong Som Eun, Saom Vansodany	Legendary	Not yet remade
Lum Ong Puthichat	Kong Som Eun	Kong Som Eun, Vichara Dany	Legendary, romance	Not yet remade
Moan Sor Moan Kmao	Ly Va	Kong Som Eun, Pov Tevi	Legendary	Not yet remade
Neang Champei Sor	Vichara Dany, Chao Hong	Kong Som Eun, Vichara Dany	Legendary	Not yet remade
Neang Phat Cheay	Saravuth	Kong Som Eun, Saom Vansodany	Legendary	Not yet remade
Soriya Lngeach Tngai	Saravuth	Chea Yuthon, Saom Vansodany		Remade once in 2006
Orn Euy Srey Orn	Ly Bun Yim	Kong Som Eun, Virak Dara	Legendary	Present existence
Pandei Vil	Nop Nem	Kong Som Eun, Kim Nova	Romance	Not yet remade
Panhjapor Tevi	Chea Nuk	Kong Som Eun, Vichara Dany, Mandoline	Legendary	Present existence
Peil Dael Truv Yum	Ung Kanthuok	Kong Som Eun, Vichara Dany, Kim Nova	Drama	Present existence
Pno 3 Leu Dei Neak Kro	Sa Sa Kuy Ny and Vann Vannak	Vann Vannak, Kim Nova	Legendary	Present existence in damaged condition
Pruot Pruos Avei	Chuon Chai and Vann Vannak	Chea Yuthon, Vichara Dany	Romance	Not yet remade
Ream Chbong Yeung	So Min Chiv	Kong Som Eun, Vichara Dany Kim Nova	Drama	Not yet remade
Rithisen Prune Meas		Kong Som Eun, Vichara Dany Kim Nova	Legendary	Not yet remade
Roloke Veasna			Drama	Not yet remade
Senarong Senary	Lai Nguon Heng	Kong Som Eun, Vichara Dany	Legendary	Not yet remade
Si Yin Kuy	So Min Chiv	Kong Som Eun, Vichara Dany Kim Nova	Legendary	Not yet remade
The Snake Kings Wife Part 2	Tea Lim Kun	Chea Yuthon, Dy Saveth, Sombat Metanne, Aranya Namwong	Legendary	Missing
Sromoul Pdei Knhom	Sun Bun Ly		Drama	Not yet remade
Teav Aek	Biv Chai Leang	Kong Som Eun, Vichara Dany	Legendary	Remade in 1992 as Neang Teav Jole Malop and 2003 as Tum Teav
Tuk Cheng	So Min Chiv	Kong Som Eun, Vichara Dany	Legendary	Not yet remade
Tuk Snae June Bong		Chea Yuthon, Kim Nova	Drama	Not yet remade
Vongveng Pruos Snae		Chea Yuthon, Dy Saveth	Drama	Not yet remade

== See also ==
- 1972 in Cambodia
