= List of Cambodian films of 1969 =

The last year of the film industry where King Norodom Sihanouk encourage the film industry. Of the 20 films listed, 4 films are in existence, 4 have been remade, and 12 have not yet been remade:

== Highest-grossing ==
The ten highest-grossing films at the Cambodian Box Office in 1969:

| 1969 Rank | Title | Notes |
|---|---|---|
| 1. | Preah Jinavong | |
| 2. | Neang Sovann Ten On | |
| 3. | Norok Lokey | |
| 4. | Veal Srey Sronoss | |
| 5. | Chompa Toung | |
| 6. | Chan Kreufa | |
| 7. | Thavory Meas Bong | |
| 8. | Inthik Sovann Chan Kesor | |
| 9. | Pkah Thgall Meas | |
| 10. | Sayon Koma Nung Preah Neang Tep Tida | |

== 1969 ==
| Title | Director | Cast | Genre | Notes |
|---|---|---|---|---|
1969
| Achey Hal Sruv | Tea Lim Kun | Mandoline, Kim Nova | Legendary | Not yet remade |
| Beisach Phnom Sar Tep Tida Songva Jak | | Vann Vannak, Vichara Dany | Legendary | Not yet remade |
| Chrolom Songsa Srova Kos Ku | | Chea Yuthon, Vichara Dany | Legendary | Not yet remade |
| Inabot | Ly You Sreang | Chea Yuthon, Vichara Dany | Legendary | Not yet remade |
| Inthik Sovann Chan Kesor | Ly Bun Yim | Kong Som Eun, Virak Dara | Legendary | Not yet remade |
| Chompa Toung | Dy Saveth | Kong Som Eun, Dy Saveth | Legendary | Present Existence |
| Chan Kreufa | Biv Chai Leang | Kong Som Eun, Saom Vansodany | Legendary | Present Existence |
| Chaya Leu Angkor | Norodom Sihanouk | | Musical | Present Existence |
| Neang Neak Trach Chor | | Chea Yuthon, Ki8m Nova | Legendary | Not yet remade |
| Neang Sovann Teng On | Saravuth | Vann Vannak, Saom Vansodany | Legendary | Not yet remade |
| Norok Lokey | | Chea Yuthon, Nop Nem | Legendary | Not yet remade |
| Pkah Thgall Meas | | Kong Som Eun, Vichara Dany | Legendary | Not yet remade |
| Pukol Koma | Chea Nuk | Kong Som Eun, Saom Vansodany | Legendary | Remade in 2007 |
| Preach Jinavong | Saravuth | Yi Ki Len, Vichara Dany | Legendary | Not yet remade |
| Song Cheam Juos Ovpuk | | | | |
| Sayon Koma Nung Preah Neang Tep Tida | Dy Saveth | Vann Vannak, Dy Saveth | Legendary | Remade once in 2005 |
| Tep Sangva | Sun Bun Ly | Mae Yasith, VPuong Phavy | Legendary | Remade in 2004 |
| Thavory Meas Bong | Ung Kanthuok | Kong Som Eun, Saom Vansodany, Vichara Dany | Drama | Present Existence |
| Veal Srey Sronoss | Ly Va | Vann Vannak, Pov Tevi | Legendary | Remade in 2005 |
| Veasna Akosol | | Mae Yasith Dy SSaveth | Legendary | Present Existence |
| La Joie de vivre | | Nhiek Tioulong Saksi Sbong | Comedy | Not yet remade |
