= List of Cambodian films of 1967 =

Vichara Dany stars in her debut film Picheyvongsa and in three years, 1970, she would become the lead actress for 90%& of Khmer films released every year. Of the 20 films listed, 7 films are in existence, 5 have been remade including the 2 versions of Neang Keo Nama, and 8 have not yet been remade, :

Title	Director	Cast	Genre	Notes
1967
Chey Sorivong	Chea Nuk	Nor Rithya, Saom Vansodany	Legendary	Not yet remade
Dara Vichey Malai Soriya		Kong Som Eun, Kim Nova	Legendary	Present Existence
Kromum Khmer Leu	Narie Hem	Narie Hem		Not yet remade
Neak Ta Kleung Meung	So Min Chiv	Kong Som Eun, Vichara Dany	Legendary	Not yet remade
Neang Keo Nama	Biv Chai Leang	Vann Vannak, Saom Vansodany	Legendary	Remade in 2005
Neang Keo Nama	Dy Saveth	Kong Som Eun, Dy Saveth	Legendary	Remade in 2005
Kakey	Biv Chai Leang	Vann Vannak, Vichara Dany	Legendary	Not yet remade
Pov Chouk Sar	Tea Lim Kun	Chea Yuthon, Dy Saveth		Present Existence
Psaeng Moranak	Saravuth	Peak Sak Pen, Som Sopanny	Legendary	Not yet remade
Picheyvongsa	So Min Chiv	Chea Yuthon, Vichara Dany	Legendary	Remade in 1996 and 2004
Preah Tinavong	Ly Va	Chea Yuthon, Pov Tevi	Legendary	Present Existence
Preach Chan Korup		Kong Som Eun, Saom Vansodany	Legendary	Present Existence
Preah Leak Sinavong Neang Pream Kesor		Kong Som Eun, So Vannara	Legendary	Remade in 1994 and 2005
Prey Prasith	King Norodom Sihanouk	King Norodom Sihanouk		Present Existence
Puthisean Neang Kong rey	Ly Bun Yim	Kong Som Eun, Virak Dara	Legendary	Present Existence
Sovannahong	Yvon Hem	Kong Som Eun, Saom Vansodany	Legendary	Present Existence
Snaeha Srok Srae		Meas Som El, Saom Vansodany	Romance	Remade in 2006
Sophiny Meas Bong	Saravuth	Chuon Chai, Som Sophiny	Romance	Not yet remade
Tuk Pnek Leu Knong Phnom	Dy Saveth	Kong Som Eun, Dy Saveth	Drama	Not yet remade
Tep Tida Yuo Preah Klen		Kong Som Eun, Kim Nova	Legendary	Not yet remade
