= List of Cambodian films of 1970 =

A new age of Khmer films with Vichara Dany and Kong Som Eun as the common lead actors. 4 films on this list are in existence, 5 have been remade, and 11 have not yet been remade.

== Highest-grossing ==
The ten highest-grossing films at the Cambodian Box Office in 1970:

1970; Rank	Title	Notes
1.	The Snake King's Wife
2.	Sdach Domrei Sor
3.	Sovann Pancha
4.	Chompa Meas
5.	Tropeang Peay
6.	Pka Angkeabos
7.	Akaret Moyoura
8.	Neang Ampopich
9.	Preah Mohosot
10.	Rattanavong

== 1970 ==
Title	Director	Cast	Genre	Notes
1970
Akareth Moyoura	Saravuth	Kong Som Eun, Chea Yuthon, Vichara Dany	Legendary	Not yet remade
Botra Psong Cheam Mdai	Dy Saveth	Chea Yuthon, Dy Saveth	Legendary	Not yet remade
Hang Yun	Ly Va	Kong Som Eun, Pov Tevi		Not yet remade
1 Meun Alai	Ung Kanthuok	Kong Som Eun, Vichara Dany	Drama	Present Existence
Neang Ampopich	Ly You Sreang	Kong Som Eun, Vichara Dany	Legendary	Not yet remade
Neang Champameas	Chan Nary	Kong Som Eun, Vichara Dany	Legendary	Not yet remade
Sovann Pancha	Yvon Hem	Vann Vannak and Vichara Dany	Legendary	Present Existence
Pen Sovann	Chea Nuk	Kong Som Eun, Saom Vansodany	Legendary	Not yet remade
Pka Angkeabos	Pek Sampen and Chao Hong	Kong Som Eun, Saom Vansodany	Legendary	Remade once in 1995 and again in 2005
Pos Keng Kang (The Snake King's Wife)	Tea Lim Kun	Chea Yuton, Dy Saveth	Scientific/ Legendary/Romance	1 of the greatest Khmer film ever made in the 20th century. Awarded at the 19th Asian Movie Awards in Singapore in 1972 where it received 6 golden awards. Present Existence-includes the songs "Soreeya Psong Snae" in both a male and female version.
Preah Mohosot		Kong Som Eun, Saom Vansodany	Legendary	Not yet remade
Preay Krola Pleung	Nop Nem	Kong Som Eun, Kim Nova, Nop Nem	Horror	Remade once again in 2002
Rattanavong	Biv Chai Leang	Kong Som Eun, Vichara Dany, Saom Vansodany	Legendary	Present Existence
Rithivong		Chea Yuthon, Nop Yada	Legendary	Not yet remade
Sangkum Banh Loloke	Ly Bun Yim	Trente Deux, Virak Dara	Comedy	Not yet remade
Sdach Domrei Sor	Dy Saveth	Vann Vannak, Dy Saveth	Legendary	Remade once in 2005
Slap Ruos Pruos Somdei	Ly Bun Yim	Ly Bun Yim, Virak Dara	Drama	Not yet remade
Srey Krup Leak	Dy Saveth	Chea Yuthon, Dy Saveth	Legendary	Not yet remade
Srey Krup Leak	Ly Va	Chea Yuthon, Pov Tevi	Legendary	Version 2. Not yet remade
Tropeang Peay (ត្រពាំងពាយ)	Ly You Sreang	Kong Som Eun and Vichara Dany	Legendary	Remade once in 2007
