= List of Cambodian films of 1968 =

The Cambodian film industry advances mainly while Legendary films remain the consumers favourite genre. Of the 20 films listed, 4 films are in existence, 4 have been remade, and 12 have not yet been remade:

Title	Director	Cast	Genre	Notes
1968
Abul Kasame	Yvon Hem	Kong Som Eun, Saom Vansodany	Legendary	Present Existence
Achey Neang Krod	Tea Lim Kun	Mandoline, Map Noya	Legendary	Present Existence
Ah Sach June Mdai	Saravuth	Kong Som Eun, Vichara Dany	Legendary	Not yet remade
Athitvongsa Sisoriyavong	Saravuth	Kong Som Eun, Vichara Dany	Legendary	Remade in 2005
Chao King Kuok	Sun Bun Ly	Lo Heap	Legendary	Not yet remade (Only adapted into short comedies)
Cheav Kun Reu Chan Kesei	Chea Nuk	Kong Som Eun, Kim Nova	Legendary	Not yet remade
Chey Tot	Ly You Sreang	Chea Yuthon, Vichara Dany	Legendary	Not yet remade
Kraitoung Kropeu Charavan	Dy Saveth	Kong Som Eun, Dy Saveth	Legendary	Not yer remade
Mang Sitao Mang Sineat	So Min Chiv	Kong Som Eun, Pich Komham Roth	Legendary	Remade in 1996
Neang Pimpea Sor Jeat	Biv Chai Leang	Kong Som Eun, Saom Vansodany	Legendary	Not yet remade
Pkai Dos Kuntuy	Nop Nem	Kong Som Eun, Kim Nova	Legendary	Not yet remade
Preah Apaimony Sisovann	So Min Chiv	Chea Yuthon, Pov Tevy	Legendary	Not yet remade
Preah Toung Neang Neak		Kong Som Eun, Kim Nova	Legendary	Remade in 1996 and again in 2004
Saék Oun Lea bong Hauy	Dy Saveth	Kong Som Eun, Dy Saveth	Drama	Not yet remade
Sangselajey	Long Sideth	Chea Yuthon, Vichara Dany	Legendary	Not yet remade
Somleng Klaeng Aek			Legendary	Remade in 2006
Saen Tearun	Ung Kanthuok	Kong Som Eun, Vichara Dany	Romance	Not yet remade
Sronoss Somdei Srey Am	Ly Va	Vann Vannak, Pov Tevi	Drama	Not yet remade
Tep Sodachan	Lai Nguon Heng	Kong Som Eun, Vichara Dany	Legendary	Present Existence
Ynav Bosseba	Yvon Hem	Kong Som Eun, Saom Vansodany	Legendary	Present Existence
