= List of Cambodian films of 1974 =

Film directors struggled to maintain the integrity of the film industry. They went on strikes to keep theaters from shutting down. In this year, director Yvon Hem bought another theater for $400,000. A list of films produced in Cambodia in 1974. From the 35 films listed, 2 films exist today, 7 have been remade, and 28 have not yet been remade.

Title	Director	Cast	Genre	Notes
1974
Ah Kvak Ah Kvenn		Ly Va, Trente Deux	Legendary	Remade in 2006
Angkoulimea	Saravuth	Chea Yuthon, Saom Vansodany	Legendary	Not yet remade
Bromat Bromong	Yvon Hem	Chea Yuthon, Vichara Dany	Horror	Remade in 1993 and again in 2006
Chomnong Dai Tuk Pnek	Ly Bun Yim	Kong Som Eun, Virak Dara	Romance	Not yet remade
Chomrieng Et Preang Tuok	Sinn Sisamouth	Chea Yuthon, Vichara Dany	Legendary	Not yet remade
Chao Chek Smok	Ly Va	Trente Deux	Comedy	Not yet remade
Chao Srotop Chek	Kiev Sora	Lim Siphon, Bo Ravy	Legendary	Remade in 2003
Cheam Entry Kmao	Vann Vannak	Vann Vannak, Saom Vansodany	Legendary	Not yet remade
Konlong Bak Slab	Mak Hou	Kong Som Ath, Kim Nova	Drama	Not yet remade
Konsaeng Sladok	Chan Nary	Kong Som Eun, Vichara Dany,	Legendary	Not yet remade
Keo Long Keo Lai	So Min Chiv	Kong Som Eun, Vichara Dany	Legendary	Remade in 2004
Kolap Longvek		Kong Som Eun, Vichara Dany	Legendary	Not yet remade
Crocodile Man	Hui Kung	Chea Yuthon, Dy Saveth	Legendary	Present Existence
Kromum Jole Malup	Vann Vannak	Vann Vannak, Saom Vansodany	Legendary	Not yet remade
Kromum Sauch Komloss Yum	Long Sideth	Chea Yuthon, Puong Phavy,	Romance	Not yet remade
Monn Rongeav 2 Dong Bong Tov Rok Oun	Trente Deux	Trente deux, Vichara Dany	Comedy	Not yet remade
Neak Srae Jole Krung	Trente Deux	Trente Deux	Comedy	Not yet remade
Neang Badaja	Saravuth	Chea Yuthon, Vichara Dany	Legendary	Remade in 1994 and again in 2006
Neang Mohouri	Ly You Sreang	Chea Yuthon, Chouk Roth	Legendary	Not yet remade
Neang Trocheul Doss Tral	Tat Somnang	Kong Som Eun, Vichara Dany,	Legendary	Not yet remade
Oh Na Satum Srey	Vichara Dany	Kong Som Eun, Vichara Dany, Kim Nova	Legendary	Not yet remade
Plov Chaek Chea 3	Chuon Chai	Kong Som Eun, Vichara Dany	Romance	Remade in 1992
Pnhau Kong Jong Dai	Lanh Don Ro	Kong Som Eun, Dy Saveth	Legendary	Not yet remade
Preah Moha Monkoline	Biv Chai Leang	Nop Nem, Vichara Dany	Legendary	Remade in 2007
Preay Bompe Kone		Puong Phavy	Horror	Not yet remade
Rehu Chap Chan	Chan Nary	Chea Yuthon, Vichara Dany	Legendary	Not yet remade
Si Bai Baok Chnang	Tat Somnang	Trente Deux, Vichara Dany	Legendary	Not yet remade
Srey Na Min Yum	So Min Chiv	Kong Som Eun, Vichara Dany	Romance	Not yet remade
Srey Sross Tong Vong	So Min Chiv	Kong Som Eun, Vichara Dany	Legendary	Not yet remade
Tida Sok Puos	Dy Savethk	Kong Som Eun, Dy Saveth	Legendary	Present Existence
Tida Song Sek	Liv Song Heng	Chea Yuthon, Pka Rozeth	Legendary	Not yet remade
Tngai Lich Ae Neay Samut		Meas Som El	Drama, Romance	Not yet remade
Tumnuonh Bonkong Kaék	Kong Som Eun	Kong Som Eun, Vichara Dany	Legendary	Not yet remade
Yeak Ta Yeak Tum Yeak Yum Sronoss	Ly You Sreang	Kong Som Ath, Chouk Roth	Legendary	Not yet remade

== See also ==
- 1974 in Cambodia
