= List of Cambodian films of 1971 =

Khmer films increase popularity tremendously after the success of The Snake Kings Wife. A list of films produced in Cambodia in 1971. From the 24 films listed, 2 films exist today, 6 have been remade, and 16 have not yet been remade:

== Highest-grossing ==
The ten highest-grossing films at the Cambodian Box Office in 1971:

1971 Rank	Title	Notes
1.	Chaung Dai Ovpuk	
2.	Bomnul Cheam Ovpuk	
3.	Jivit Psong Preng	
4.	Neang Soriya Lngeach Tngai	
5.	Preah Peay Phat	
6.	Neang Ptul Meas	
7.	Kondung Sam Pon	
8.	Neak Kat Sok Dai Aek	
9.	Neang Preay Konthoang Khiev	
10.	Chao Jap Kdam	

Title	Director	Cast	Genre	Notes
1971
Bomnul Cheam Ovpuk	Long Sideth	Chea Yuthon, Kong Som Eun, Vichara Dany, Puong Phavy	Legendary	Not yet remade
Chan Deka Songva Pich	Ly Nguon Heng	Kong Som Eun, Vichara Dany	Legendary	Not yet remade
Chao Jap Kdam	Ly Nguon Heng	Vann Vannak, Vichara Dany	Legendary	Not yet remade
Chaung Dai Ovpuk	So Min Chiv	Kong Som Eun, Vichara Dany	Legendary	Present Existence
Chin Siphat Chin Siphai		Kong Som Eun, Kim Nova	Legendary	Not yet remade
Chivit Psong Preng	Dy Saveth	Chea Yuthon, Dy Saveth, Sombat Metanee, Aranya Namwong	Drama/Romance	Missing (Khmer/Thai joint film)
Domrei Jos Preng	Chan Nary	Chea Yuthon, Saom Vansodany	Legendary	Not yet remade
Kondung Sam Pon	Saravuth	Chea Yuthon, Vichara Dany	Legendary	Remade once in 2006
Lohet Stung Kro Nuong				Not yet remade
Neak Kat Sok Dai Aek	Kondul Krun	Chea Yuthon, Saom Vansodany	Comedy, Romance	Not yet remade
Neang Ptul Meas	Ly Nguon Heng	Kong Som Eun, Vichara Dany	Legendary	Not yet remade
Neang Preay Kontong Kiev	Ly You Sreang	Kong Som Eun, Saom Vansodany	Horror	Remade once again in 2007
Panjapor Tevi Part 1	Chea Nuk	Kong Som Eun, Vichara Dany	Legendary	Not yet remade
Penarong Pongnarith	So Min Chiv	Kong Som Eun, Vichara Dany	Legendary	Not yet remade
Pich Songvavong	Kong Som Eun	Kong Som Eun, Vichara Dany	Legendary	Not yet remade
Pal Kam Knhom	Tan Bunleak	Mae Yasith, Bun Chan Sophea	Drama	Present existence
Preah Komchaitep	Yvon Hem	Kong Som Eun, Saom Vansodany	Legendary	Not yet remade
Preah Peay Phat	Ly You Sreang	Kong Som Eun, Vichara Dany	Legendary, Romance	Not yet remade
Prolung Polikal	Vann Vannak	Vann Vannak, Vichara Dany	Legendary	Not yet remade
Prum Daen Prum Jet		Nor Rithya, Vichara Dany	Drama	Remade once in 2006
Sarai Andaet	Saravuth	Saravuth, Vichara Dany	Legendary	Remade once in 2006
Soriya Lngeach Tngai	Saravuth	Chea Yuthon, Saom Vansodany		Remade once in 2006
Tida Klok Tep	So Min Chiv	Kong Som Eun, Vichara Dany	Legendary	Not yet remade
Tuk Rom Tmo Rom	Hang Thun Hak		Legendary	Remade once in 2004

== See also ==
- 1971 in Cambodia
