= List of Cambodian films of 1973 =

A list of films produced in Cambodia in 1973. From the 38 films listed, two films exist today, five have been remade, and 31 have not yet been remade.

== 1973 ==
Title	Director	Cast	Genre	Notes
1973
Ah Lev Ah Vek Nung Kru Ek Ev		Chea Yuthon, Vichara Dany	Legendary	Not yet remade
Aso Oun Pong	Saravuth	Kong Som Eun, Vichara Dany	Romance	Remade in 2006
Beisach Kromum	Ly You Sreang	Kong Som Eun, Chouk Rath	Horror	Not yet remade
Beisach Song Sek	Vann Vannak	Vann Vannak, Kim Nova	Legendary	Not yet remade
Botum Srey Roth	Ly Va	Kong Som Eun, Vichara Dany, Pov Tevy	Legendary	Not yet remade
Cham Na Prumliket		Kong Som Eun, Vichara Dany	Romance	Not yet remade
Jao Kombet Buntos	Tat Somnang	Lim Siphon, Vichara Dany	Legendary	Remade in 2007
Chey Prach	So Min Chiv	Trente Deux, Vichara Dany	Legendary	Not yet remade
Chivit Ahpuop		Kong Som Eun, Kim Nova	Drama	Present Existence
Jivit Knung Pleung Songkream		Nop Nem, Kim Nova, Saom Vansodany	Drama	Not yet remade
Jivit Tmei	Tat Somang	Kong Som Eun, Dy Saveth	Drama	Not yet remade
Cheut Chet		Vann Vannak, Saom Vansodany	Romance	Not yet remade
Chnam Oun 16 (1973 film)	Chea Yuthon	Chea Yuthon, Saom Vansodany	Romance	Not yet remade
Choul Sach Jrova Cha'ung	Chuon Chai	Kong Som Eun, Kim Nova	Drama	Not yet remade
Dav Dek 32	Trente Deux	Trente Deux, Dy Saveth	Comedy	Not yet remade
Dejo Domden		Chea Yuthon, Vichara Dany, Kim Nova	Legendary	Remade in 2001
Gat Gantuy Leap Gambao	Trente Deux	Trente Deux	Comedy	Not yet remade
Kone Krok Kmao	Vann Vannak	Vann Vannak, Vichara Dany, Kim Nova	Legendary	Not yet remade
Kleng Sor Kleng Kmao	Saravuth	Chea Yuthon, Saom Vansodany	Legendary	Not yet remade
Moan Sor Moan Kmao	Ly Va	Kong Som Eun, Pov Tevi	Legendary	Not yet remade
Klem Jan Kreusna	Saravuth	Chea Yuthon, Saom Vansodany	Legendary	Not yet remade
Konsaeng Krohom	Ly You Sreang	Kong Som Eun, Vichara Dany	Legendary	Remade in 2006
Majoss Meas				Not yet remade
Mak Teung	Dy Saveth	Nop Nem, Dy Saveth	Legendary	Not yet remade
Neang Lovea Chek	Mak Hou	Kong Som Eun, Kim Nova	Legendary	Not yet remade
Pei Neang Leak	Chan Nary	Kong Som Eun, Vichara Dany	Legendary	Remade in 2006
Peakdei Snae	Yvon Hem	Su Hean, Vichara Dany	Romance	Present Existence
Pisavong Bong Euy				Not yet remade
Pko Lonn Daum Chnam	So Min Chiv	Chea Yuthon, Saom Vansodany, Pkah Rosette	Romance	Not yet remade
Polto Ahpuop	Chea nuk	Kong Som Eun, Vichara Dany	Drama, War	Not yet remade
Pos Vek Srongae		Chea Yuthon, Vichara Dany, Soam Bopha	Legendary	Not yet remade
Pyuos Jivit	So Heng	Chea Yuthon, Vichara Dany, Serey Rathana, Soam Bopha	Drama	Not yet remade
Reus Kone Prosa	Trente Deux	Trente Deux, Vichara Dany	Comedy	Not yet remade
Sompeay Kam		Kong Som Eun, Som Bopha	Romance	Not yet remade
Sompong Pka Cha	Kong Som Ath	Kong Som Ath, Vichara Dany	Legendary	Not yet remade
Snam Snae Prey Kup	Tea Lim Kun	Chea Yuthon, Saom Vansodany	Romance	Not yet remade
Snae Mok Pina?		Chea Yuthon, Saom Vansodany	Romance	Not yet remade
Tong Moranak	So Min Chiv	Kong Som Eun, Vichara Dany, Kim Nova	Legendary	Not yet remade

== See also ==
- 1973 in Cambodia
