= List of Cambodian films of 1966 =

Ros Serey Sothear becomes a popular artist for movie soundtracks among film directors, taking Huoy Mea's old position. Of the 18 films listed, 4 films are in existence, 6 have been remade, and 8 have not yet been remade.

Title	Director	Cast	Genre	Notes
1966
Apsara	Norodom Sihanouk	Norodom Buppha Devi, Nhiek Tioulong, Saksi Sbong, Norodom Narindrapong		Present Existence
Aso Propun Pong	Sun Bun Ly	Liv Heub, Pka Rozeth	Legendary	Not yet remade
Chanameung	Ly You Sreang	Chea Yuthon, Pka Rozeth	Legendary	Not yet remade
Kathrauy Moha Sronoss		Kong Som Eun, Dy Saveth		Not yet remade
Kaék Pruot Bongkong		Kong Som Eun, Dy Saveth	Legendary	Remade in 2006
Kun Chang Kun Paen	Ly Va	Kong Som Eun, Pka Rozeth	Legendary	Remade in 2007
Lin Toung Koma		Yi Ki Len, Mjass Satrey Reaksmey	Legendary	Remade in 1997
Mapuyungkeo		Chea Yuthon, Kim Nova	Legendary	Remade in 2002
Moranak Meada		Kong Som Eun, Dy Saveth		Remade in 2004
Neang Vimean Chan	Dy Saveth	Kong Som Eun, Dy Saveth	Legendary	Present Existence (Not yet on DVD)
Neang Sok Kraop	Biv Chai Leang	Vann Vannak, Saom Vansodany	Legendary	Not yet remade
Preah Ream Jole Kout Bunchout Neang Seda		Yi Ki Len, Keo Montha	Legendary	Remade in 2005 as Reamke
Saóp Nass Srolanh Nass	Dy Saveth	Kong Som Eun, Dy Saveth	Romance	Not yet remade
Sromoul Akara	Biv Chai Leang	Kong Som Eun, Pich Komnanh Roth	Fantasy	Not yet remade
Tomnuonh Sek Meas		Kong Som Eun, Pka Rozeth		Not yet remade
The Little Prince	Norodom Sihanouk	Norodom Sihamoni		Present Existence
Tuk Pnek Neang Ko		Kong Som Eun, Keo Montha	Drama	Present Existence
Vil Vinh Na Bong	Tea Lim Kun	Nop Nem, Dy Saveth	Drama	Present Existence
