= List of Cambodian films of 1965 =

The Golden Age of Khmer cinema begins. Of the 13 films listed, 2 films are in existence, 5 have been remade, and 6 have not yet been remade, :

Title	Director	Cast	Genre	Notes
1965
Chao Bai Kdang				
Chao Srotop Jek			Legendary	Remade in 2003
Kal Na Pka Reek			Legendary	
Kyong Sang			Legendary	
Loloke Nhee Chmole			Legendary	
Neang Karaket			Legendary	
Ok Lea Tronum		Mae Yasit, Dy Saveth	Legendary	Present Existence. Remade in 2006
Preah Ko Preah Keo				
Phnom Rumduol Jeung				
Sayon Touch Yum				
Sappsitt	Ly Bun Yim	Kong Som Eun, Virak Dara	Legendary	Present Existence
Tuk Pnek Neang Ko Nov Pume Chantrea			Drama	
Tuk Pnek Ovpuk	Kong Buncheun	Tat Kimleng	Drama	
