= Sangkum Banh Loloke =

- Promotional poster
- Starring: Kong Som Eun; Virak Dara
- Music by: Sinn Sisamouth
- Release date: 1970
- Country: Cambodia
- Language: Khmer

Sangkum Banh Loloke (Khmer: សំគមបាញ់លលក) is a 1970 film directed by Ly Bun Yim. It stars Kong Som Eun and Virak Dara.

== Cast ==
- Kong Som Eun
- Virak Dara
