= Dav Bakdong Meas =

Dav Bakdoung Meas
- Directed by: So Min Chiv
- Starring: Vann Vannak, Vichara Dany
- Music by: Sinn Sisamouth
- Release date: 1972
- Country: Cambodia
- Language: Khmer

Dav Bakdong Meas (Khmer: ដាវបាក់ដងមាសប្រយុទ្ធនឹងឆ្អឹងដៃឱពុក) is a 1972 Khmer film directed by So Min Chiv. The film stars Vann Vannak and Vichara Dany. It is the sequenl to the 1971's Chaúng Dai Onpuk.

== Cast ==
- Vann Vannak
- Vichara Dany
- Dara Chom Chann
