= Chek Deth =

1972 Cambodian film directed by Yvon Hem

Jek Det
- Directed by: Yvon Hem
- Produced by: Yvon Hem
- Starring: Kong Som Eun; Vichara Dany
- Music by: Sinn Sisamouth
- Release date: 1972
- Country: Cambodia
- Language: Khmer

Chek Deth (Khmer: ចៈដេត) is a 1972 Cambodian film directed by Yvon Hem. The film stars Kong Som Eun and Vichara Dany.

== Cast ==
- Kong Som Eun
- Vichara Dany
- Phoung Polly
- Huy San

== Soundtrack ==
Song	Singer(s)	Notes
Konsaeng Bancham Jet	Sinn Sisamouth	
Snae November Tae Snae	Ros Serey Sothear	
