= Chnam Oun 16 =

Chnam Oun 16 may refer to:

- Chnam Oun 16 (1973 film), a 1973 Khmer film
- Chnam Oun 16 (1992 film), a 1992 film musical
