= Neang Champameas =

Neang Champa Meas
- Vinyl album cover
- Directed by: Saravuth
- Starring: Vann Vannak; Vichara Dany
- Music by: Sinn Sisamouth; Ros Sereysothea
- Release date: 1970
- Country: Cambodia
- Language: Khmer

Neang Champa Meas (Khmer: នាងចំប៉ាមាស) is a 1970 Khmer film directed by Saravuth and stars Vann Vannak and Vichara Dany.

== Cast ==
- Vann Vannak
- Vichara Dany
- Kim Nova

== Soundtrack ==
- Snae Champa Meas by Sinn Si Samouth and Ros Serey Sothear
- Snaeha Champa Meas by Sinn Si Samouth and Ros Serey Sothear
- Kom Kot Bong Ey by Sinn Si Samouth and Ros Serey Sothear
- Lea Huy Kam Sne Lokey by Roa Serey Sothea
