= Chhnam Oun 16 =

Chhnam Oun 16 may refer to:

- Chhnam Oun 16 (1973 film), a Cambodian film
- Chhnam Oun 16 (1992 film), a Cambodian musical film
