= 1970 in Cambodia =

- Decades: 1950s; 1960s; 1970s; 1980s; 1990s
- See also: Other events of 1970; List of years in Cambodia

The following lists events that happened during 1970 in Cambodia.

The year saw the overthrow of the Kingdom of Cambodia and its monarchy in a coup backed by the United States in March that established the Khmer Republic.

In March 1970, a coup d'état led by General Lon Nol and Prince Sisowath Sirik Matak resulted in the removal of Prince Norodom Sihanouk from power while he was abroad. The National Assembly voted to depose Sihanouk and transferred executive authority to Lon Nol. The monarchy was subsequently abolished, and the Khmer Republic was proclaimed in October 1970.

The political change marked a significant shift in Cambodia’s position during the Vietnam War. The new government aligned more closely with the United States and South Vietnam, while North Vietnamese and Viet Cong forces continued operating within Cambodian territory. The developments contributed to escalating internal conflict, which later formed part of the broader Cambodian Civil War.

== Incumbents ==
- Monarch: Norodom Sihanouk (until 18 March), Cheng Heng (starting 21 March)
- Prime Minister: Lon Nol

== Births ==
- 19 October – Kem Ley, political activist (died 2016)

== Events ==
=== March ===
- March 18 - King Norodom Sihanouk is overthrowned in a coup.

=== October ===
- October 9 - The Khmer Republic was formally declared as the government of Cambodia.

== See also ==
- List of Cambodian films of 1970
