= Teav Aek =

- Directed by: Biv Chai Leang
- Produced by: Biv Chai Leang
- Starring: Kong Som Eun; Vichara Dany
- Music by: Sinn Sisamouth
- Release date: 1972
- Country: Cambodia
- Language: Khmer

Teav Aek (Khmer: ទាវឯក) is a 1972 Khmer film directed by Biv Chai Leang. The film stars Kong Som Eun and Vichara Dany. It is based on the Khmer novel written by Preah Botumthera Som, Tum Teav, which is widely considered the Khmer Romeo and Juliet. This film was remade in 2003 by Fai Som Ang as Tum Teav.

== Plot ==
A talented novice monk named Tum, Kong Som Eun, falls in love with Teav, Vichara Dany a very beautiful young lady. Teav give offerings to Tum and he proudly accept the offers, which in the Cambodian tradition a young female is not allowed to engage in any close activity with a monk, that means even giving offerings is not allowed. As the story progress, the relationship of Tum and Teav escalates. Teav's mother is unaware of the relationship between the monk she respects and her 16-year-old daughter. No, Teav's friendly assistant, helps conceal the relationship of Tum and Teav from Teav's mother. As soon as Teav's mother finds out that Tum is in love with her daughter she forbids her daughter from ever seeing him again. The story ends in a dramatic tragedy when Tum is killed and Teav commits suicide.

== Cast ==
- Kong Som Eun
- Vichara Dany
- Nop Nem
- Sek Bothoum
- Or Dom

== Soundtrack ==
Song	Singer(s)	Notes
Jomrieng Tum Teav	Sinn Sisamouth	
Vengnong Neang Teav	Sinn Sisamouth	
Jomrieng No Nung Pich	Eng Nary and Pan Ron	
Sauch Teang Tuk Pnek	Ros Serey Sothear	
