= Kompull Boros Mok 2 =

- Directed by: Tat Somnang
- Written by: Kong Buncheun
- Starring: Kong Som Eun; Vichara Dany; Kim Nova; Lim Sophoan; Soam Bopha
- Music by: Sinn Sisamouth
- Release date: 1972
- Country: Cambodia
- Language: Khmer

Kompull Boros Mok Pee (Khmer: កំពូលបុរសមុខពីរ) is a 1972 Khmer film directed by Tat Somnang. The film stars Kong Som Eun, Eli Bloch, and Vichara Dany.

== Plot ==
Kong Som Eun pretends to be another man, practicing his romantic advantages, to test his lovers, Vichara Dany and Som Bopha, and exhibit whether they truly love only him and no other, like the other man he is disguised as.

== Cast ==
- Kong Som Eun
- Vichara Dany
- Kim Nova
- Lim Sophoan
- Soam Bopha
- Trente deux
- Map Noya

== Soundtrack ==
Song	Singer(s)	Notes
Jet 1 Tlaum 1	Sinn Sisamouth and Ros Serey Sothear	
Ku Preng Min Prot	Sinn Sisamouth, Pan Ron, Ros Serey Sothear, and Tat Samnang	
Jong Ban Tae Jet	Sinn Sisamouth and Pen Ron	
