= Abul Kasame =

1968 film directed by Yvon Hem

- Directed by: Yvon Hem
- Starring: Kong Som Eun; Saom Vansodany
- Music by: Sinn Sisamouth
- Distributed by: Baksei Thansuork
- Release date: 1968
- Country: Cambodia
- Language: Khmer

Abul Kasame (Khmer: អាប៊ុលកាសេម, UNGEGN: Abŭl Kasém) is a 1968 Khmer film adapted from one of the many tales of 1001 Arabian Nights. The film is directed by Yvon Hem and stars Kong Som Eun and Saom Vansodany. The film has recently been discovered to be in existence in 2008. Another film similar to this, and is also directed by Yvon Hem, is Ynav Bosseba.

== Cast ==
- Kong Som Eun
- Saom Vansodany
- Pech Saleoun
- Mandoline
- Chin Sinath

== Soundtrack ==
- "ចន្ទរះថ្ងៃត្រង់" by Sinn Si Samouth and Ros Serey Sothea
- "Mon Teip Ney Chomreng" by Sinn Si Samouth and Ros Serey Sothea
