= Sdach Domrei Sor =

Sdach Domrei Sor (King of the White Elephant)
- Promotional poster
- Directed by: Dy Saveth
- Starring: Vann Vannak; Dy Saveth
- Music by: Sinn Sisamouth
- Distributed by: Sovann Kiri
- Release date: 1970
- Country: Cambodia
- Language: Khmer

Sdach Domrei Sar (Khmer: ស្ដេចដំរីស) is a 1970 Khmer film directed by actress Dy Saveth and stars Vann Vannak and Dy Saveth herself. The film has been remade again in 2005.

== Cast ==
- Vann Vannak
- Dy Saveth

== Soundtrack ==
- Jao Luoch Jet by Sinn Si Samouth and Ros Serey Sothear
