= Ream Chbong Yeung =

Riem Chbong Yeung
- Khmer promotional Poster
- Directed by: So Min Chiv
- Starring: Kong Som Eun; Vichara Dany; Kim Nova; Kong Som Ath; Kong Chantha; Sek Bothum
- Music by: Sinn Sisamouth
- Distributed by: Bayon
- Release date: 1972
- Country: Cambodia
- Language: Khmer

Riem Chbong Yeung (Khmer: រៀមច្បងយើង) is a 1972 Cambodian romance film directed by So Min Chiv and stars Kong Som Eun and Vichara Dany.

== Soundtrack ==
Song	Singer(s)	Notes
Riem Chbong Yeung	Sinn Sisamouth	
Rodov Pka Riek	Sinn Sisamouth and Ros Serey Sothear	
Projum Knea Rom Sabai	Sinn Sisamouth and Pan Ron	
Kroug Leng	Sinn Sisamouth and In Yeng and Ros Serey Sothea	
