= Panhjapor Tevi =

Panjapor Tevi/Panchapo Devi
- Directed by: Chea Nuk
- Produced by: Chea Nuk
- Starring: Kong Som Eun; Vichara Dany; Mandoline
- Music by: Sinn Sisamouth
- Release date: 1972
- Country: Cambodia
- Language: Khmer

Panjapor Tevi is a 1972 Cambodian film adapted from the Chinese tale Sophik Eng Tai. The film is directed by Chea Nuk and stars Kong Som Eun and Vichara Dany.

== Soundtrack ==
Song	Singer(s)
Tansuo Soben	Sinn Sisamouth and Ros Serey Sothear
Panjapor Kaúot Cheam	Sinn Sisamouth
Oun Prom Pdach Ka Su Slap Tam Bong	Ros Serey Sothear
