= Tida Sok Puos =

- Directed by: Hui Kung
- Produced by: Hui Kung
- Starring: Kong Som Eun; Dy Saveth; Mandoline
- Release date: 1973
- Country: Cambodia
- Language: Khmer

Tida Sok Puos (Khmer: ធីតាសក់ពស់) or Snake Hair is a 1973 Cambodian film directed by Hui Kung starring Kong Som Eun, Dy Saveth, and Mandoline.

== Cast ==
- Kong Som Eun
- Dy Saveth
- Mandoline

== Background ==
The film is considered the most iconic of "one of the most notable faces of the golden age of Khmer cinema", Dy Saveth.
