= 1973 in Cambodia =

- Decades: 1950s; 1960s; 1970s; 1980s; 1990s
- See also: Other events of 1973; List of years in Cambodia

The following lists events that happened during 1973 in Cambodia.

== Incumbents ==
- President: Cheng Heng (until March 9), Lon Nol (starting March 9)
- Prime Minister:
  - until 6 May: Hang Thun Hak
  - 6 May-9 December: In Tam
  - 9 December-26 December: vacant
  - starting 26 December: Long Boret

== Events ==
- 18 March - Five members of the former Royal family were arrested following an air attack on the Presidential Palace that killed 20 people, the government also declared a state of emergency.
- 4 April - Cambodian National Assembly declares a state of national danger following continuation of subversive activities against the government.

== See also ==
- List of Cambodian films of 1973
