= Putisaen Nieng Kangrei =

- Cambodian promotional poster
- Directed by: Ly Bun Yim
- Produced by: Ly Bun Yim
- Starring: Kong Som Eun; Virak Dara
- Release date: 1968 (Cambodia)
- Country: Cambodia
- Language: Khmer

Putisaen Nieng Kangrei, (Note: Khmer: ពុទិសែននាងកង្រី; Pŭtĭsaen Niang Kǎngrei, [pu.ti saen niəŋ kɑːŋ.rəj], transl. Putisaen and Miss Kangrei) also called "Twelve Sisters", is a 1968 Cambodian film based on a Cambodian myth of The Twelve Sisters whose protagonist is Miss Kangrei, after whom a mountain range in Kampong Chhnang was named. The film has been re-released twice, in 2000 and 2002, and aired on the Cambodian channel Royal Cambodian Armed Forces Television.

The lead cast included Kong Som Eun and Virak Dara.

The film is considered a classic of Cambodian cinema.

== Soundtrack ==
Song	Singer(s)	Notes
"ទំនួញនាងកង្រី" Tomnuonh Niang Kangroei	Virak Dara	
"មរណៈភាពនាងកង្រី" Moreana Phiap Niang Kangroei	Sinn Sisamouth	

== Cast ==
- Kong Som Eun
- Virak Dara
- Nop Naem
- Kim Nova
- Saksi Sbong
- Ly Rattanak
