= Chamrieng Et Preang Tuk =

- Cambodian promotional Poster
- Directed by: Sinn Sisamouth
- Written by: Sinn Sisamouth
- Produced by: Sinn Sisamouth
- Starring: Chea Yuthorn; Vichara Dany; Ros Serey Sothea; Has Salon
- Music by: Sinn Sisamouth
- Release date: 1974
- Country: Cambodia
- Language: Khmer

Chamrieng Et Preang Tuk (Khmer: ចម្រៀងឥតព្រាងទុក) is a 1974 Cambodian musical film directed and produced by Sinn Sisamouth. The film star Kong Som Eun and Vichara Dany. It also features singer Ros Serey Sothea.

== Soundtrack ==
Song	Singer(s)	Notes
"ព្រឹលភ្នែកអស់ហើយ"	Sinn Sisamouth	
"ចុតហ្មាយមច្ចុរាជ"	Ros Serey Sothear	
"ចម្រៀងឥតព្រាងទុក"	Sinn Sisamouth	
"ក្លែបក្លិនចន្ធូ"	Sinn Sisamouth and Ros Serey Sothea	
