= 1972 in Cambodia =

- Decades: 1950s; 1960s; 1970s; 1980s; 1990s
- See also: Other events of 1972; List of years in Cambodia

The following lists events that happened during 1972 in the Khmer Republic.

== Incumbents ==
- President: Cheng Heng (until March 9), Lon Nol (starting March 9)
- Prime Minister:
  - until March 18: Sisowath Sirik Matak
  - 18 March-15 October: Son Ngoc Thanh
  - starting 15 October: Hang Thun Hak

== Events ==
=== March ===
- 17 March - Lon Nol proclaimed himself to be the first President of the Khmer Republic, an office that had been vacant for the first two years of the republic's existence.

=== June ===
- 4 June - The first presidential election held in Cambodia resulted in a victory for the incumbent, Lon Nol, although counting within the capital of Phnom Penh showed a majority for challenger In Tam. Lon Nol ordered the military to collect and count the poll results from the countryside, where In Tam had had greater support, and was soon declared the winner.

=== September ===
- 3 September - The elections for the Khmer Republic's 126-member National Assembly took place. Because of a presidential decree designed to give President Lon Nol's Social Republican Party an advantage, the other parties withdrew from participating. The Socio-Republicans won all 126 seats on what was claimed to be a 78% turnout.

== See also ==
- List of Cambodian films of 1972
