= Tep Sodachan =

1968 film

- Promotional poster
- Directed by: Lay Nguon Heng
- Starring: Kong Som Oeurn; Vichara Dany; Saksi Sbong
- Music by: Sinn Sisamouth
- Production company: Van Chan Pheap Yun
- Distributed by: Rasmey Pean Meas Production (1990) (VHS)
- Release date: 1968
- Country: Cambodia
- Language: Khmer

Tep Sodachan (Khmer: ទិព្វសូដាច័ន្ទ, Tĭpv Sodachănt [tɨp soːɗaːcan]) is a widely acclaimed Cambodian film released in 1968 by Van Chan Pheap Yun. It was directed by Lay Nguon Heng and stars Kong Sam Oeurn, Vichara Dany, and Saksi Sbong. It has become one of the more enduring creations from the nation's pre-communist era and copies are still sold today.

== Soundtrack ==
Song	Singer(s)	Notes
Bompe Tepsodachan	Sinn Sisamouth and Ros Serey Sothea	
Akara Lohet	Sinn Sisamouth and Ros Serey Sothea	

== Cast ==
- Vichara Dany
- Kong Som Eun
- Sak Si Sbong
- Ou Dom
