= Setha Sirachaya =

Thai singer (1944–2022)

- เศรษฐา ศิระฉายา
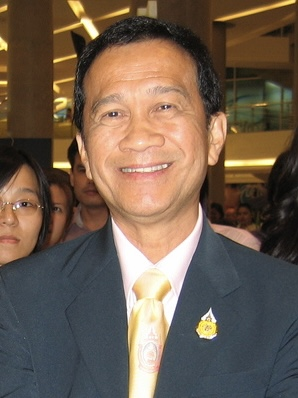
- Setha Sirichaya in 2007
- Born: 6 November 1944; Phra Nakhon province, Thailand
- Died: 20 February 2022 (aged 77); Bangkok, Thailand
- Occupations: Singer; actor; television host
- Spouse: Aranya Namwong
- Children: 1
- Awards: National Artist (2011)

Setha Sirachaya (Thai: เศรษฐา ศิระฉายา; 6 November 1944 – 20 February 2022) was a prominent Thai television host, actor, film and television producer and director, and former lead singer of the band The Impossibles. He also served as the president of the Senior Actors Welfare Foundation, contributing significantly to the welfare and support of senior actors in Thailand.

== Early life ==
Setha Sirachaya was born on 6 November 1944 in Phra Nakhon province, Thailand. He had two siblings: an older sister and a younger sister. Setha completed his high school education at Wat Bowonniwet School. He earned a Bachelor’s degree in Political Science, specializing in Politics and Governance, from Ramkhamhaeng University. He went on to obtain a Master of Business Administration (MBA) from Bangkokthonburi University and later earned a Ph.D. in Public Administration from the Faculty of Political Science at Bangkokthonburi University.

== Career ==
Setha Sirachaya entered the entertainment industry at the age of 16, initially by carrying instruments for a band at the encouragement of his uncle, Surasit Sattayawong, a renowned actor from the post-World War II era. Occasionally, Setha would take the stage to sing Elvis Presley songs, despite his limited English.

Determined to improve, Setha honed his musical skills by studying and learning from senior musicians, eventually becoming a singer at various entertainment venues, including American military camps in provincial areas during the Vietnam War. He first formed a band called Louis Guitar Girl and later gathered his musician friends Winai Phanturak, Pichai Thongniam, Anusorn Pattanakul, and Sumeth Intrasuta to form a band named Holiday J-3. At first renaming themselves Joint Reaction, they would eventually become known as The Impossibles, inspired by an American cartoon of the same name that aired on television at the time. Setha took on the role of lead singer for the band.

In 1969, The Impossibles won the royal trophy for the string combo band contest, organized by the Music Association of Thailand under royal patronage. This achievement significantly boosted the band's popularity and marked a turning point in Setha and his bandmates' careers. Shortly thereafter, the band was approached by the emerging film director Piak Poster (Somboonsuk Niyomsiri) to make a guest appearance and contribute to the soundtrack for the film "Tone" (1970), which became the band's debut appearance in a film.

The Impossibles continued to achieve success, winning the string combo band contest again in 1970 and 1972. During this period, the band saw a change in lineup when Sumeth left, and brass player and keyboardist Prachin Songpao and guitarist Sittiporn Amornphan joined, forming the classic lineup. The band would become famous for their appearances in soundtracks for numerous films.

In 1975, after an international concert tour, Setha was encouraged by Juree Osiri, a famous film, stage, and voice actor, to take on a significant film role in "Fai Kaem Phrae" (1975), for which he won the Royal Saraswati Award for Best Supporting Actor.

The Impossibles disbanded in 1976, after which Setha fully transitioned into the entertainment industry as a solo career. He gained recognition as a versatile actor, capable of playing a wide range of roles. One of his most notable films is "Cheun Rak" (1979), directed by Mom Chao Thipyachat Chatchai, where he starred opposite Aranya Namwong. This film marked the beginning of a lifelong partnership with Aranya, whom he would later marry.

In 2011, Setha Sirachaya was honored as a National Artist for his contributions as a singer.

== Illness and death ==
In 2019, Setha Sirachaya was diagnosed with lung cancer. Despite his illness, he continued to engage in his professional activities. In 2021, he contracted COVID-19 but successfully recovered from the infection.

On 20 February 2022, Setha died following further chemotherapy treatment. A bathing ceremony with royally bestowed bathing water was held on 21 February 2022 at Wat Thepsirintrawat. The cremation ceremony, featuring royally bestowed flames, took place on 5 June 2022.

== Personal life ==
His first marriage was to a flight attendant. He later married Aranya Namwong, a renowned former actress and runner-up in the Miss Thailand pageant show. Aranya later gave birth to his daughter, Putthida Sirachaya, who is a singer and television producer.
