= Preah Peay Phat =

Preah Peay Pat
- Directed by: Ly You Sreang
- Produced by: Ly You Sreang
- Starring: Kong Som Eun; Vichara Dany
- Music by: Sinn Sisamouth
- Release date: 1971
- Country: Cambodia
- Language: Khmer

Preah Peay Phat (Khmer: ព្រះពាយផាត់) is a 1971 Khmer film directed by Ly You Sreang starring Kong Som Eun and Vichara Dany.

== Plot ==
A peasant, Chivon, played by Kong Som Eun, falls in love with the daughter of a wealthy man, "Preah Peay Phat", Vichara Dany. Chivon does everything he can in order to get his lovers attention but they are forbidden to see each other. When the peasant falls in love with another woman, Preah Peay Phat is heartbroken. That is when the terrible news is revealed, Preah Peay Phat and Chivon are brothers and sisters.

== Cast ==
- Kong Som Eun
- Vichara Dany
- Phoung Phavy

== Soundtrack ==
Song	Singer(s)	Notes
Some Snae Preah Peay Phat	Sinn Sisamouth and Pan Ron	
Somleng Kmuoh Ka	Pan Ron	
