= 1974 in Cambodia =

- Decades: 1950s; 1960s; 1970s; 1980s; 1990s
- See also: Other events of 1974; List of years in Cambodia

The following lists events that happened during 1974 in Cambodia.

== Incumbents ==
- President: Lon Nol
- Prime Minister: Long Boret

== Events ==
=== February ===
- 26 February – Cambodian Civil War – Battle of Kampot: The Khmer Rouge began a military operation in Kampot after taking several Lon Nol territories fallen to Angkar like the previous victories of Operation Chenla II.

=== March ===
- 22 March - Oudong was captured by Angkar's Khmer Rouge forcing many citizens to march into the countryside, as well as executing a large number of prisoners.

=== April ===
- 2 April – Angkar and the Khmer Rouge eventually captured the city of Kampot with total destructions and mass murders happened throughout the whole area of Kampot province after it was controlled by Pol Pot with a major defeat of Lon Nol's government stronghold which led a bloody massacres engulfed Kampot province under the Khmer Rouge control with total as 90,450 people were massacred throughout the province.

== See also ==
- List of Cambodian films of 1974
