= Pkai Dos Kuntuy =

- Promotional poster
- Directed by: Nop Nem
- Starring: Kong Som Eun; Kim Nova
- Music by: Sinn Sisamouth
- Release date: 1968
- Country: Cambodia
- Language: Khmer

Pkai Dos Kuntuy is a 1968 Khmer film directed by Nop Nem. The film stars Kong Som Eun and Kim Nova.

== Cast ==
- Kong Som Eun
- Kim Nova
- Nop Nem
- Saki Sbong
- Rosanara
- Or Dom
