= Ynav Bosseba =

- Directed by: Yvon Hem
- Starring: Kong Som Eun; Saom Vansodany
- Music by: Sinn Sisamouth
- Distributed by: Baksei Tansuo
- Release date: 1968
- Country: Cambodia
- Language: Khmer

Ynav Boseeba (Khmer: អ៊ីណាវបុស្បា) is a 1968 Khmer film adapted from one of the many tales of 1001 Arabian Nights. The film is directed by Yvon Hem and stars Kong Som Eun and Saom Vansodany. The film was discovered to be in existence in 2009.

== Cast ==
- Kong Som Eun
- Saom Vansodany

== Soundtrack ==
- Snae Enov Bosseba by Sinn Si Samouth and Pen Ron
- Thomnougnh Bosseba by Ros Serey Sothea
