= Loto (actor) =

Cambodian actor

- Born: c. 1936; Cambodia
- Died: August 7, 2006 (aged 69-70); Phnom Penh, Cambodia

Suon Bou, known as Loto (1936-August 7, 2006), was a Cambodian actor.

Loto was a famous comic actor during the "Sangkum Reastr Niyum" era, and was featured in many well-known films of the time. He was consistently cast in comic roles because of his size. He is the shortest star in Cambodian history. He died after al long illness on August 7, 2006, at his home in Russey village, sangkat Stung Mean Chey, khan Mean Chey, Phnom Penh Cambodia.

== Filmography ==
- La Joie de Vivre (1969)
- The Snake Man (1972)
- Peakdey Snaeh (1973)
- City of Ghosts (2002) as Red Tuxedo Man
