= 1971 in Cambodia =

- Decades: 1950s; 1960s; 1970s; 1980s; 1990s
- See also: Other events of 1971; List of years in Cambodia

The following lists events that happened during 1971 in Cambodia.

== Incumbents ==
- President: Cheng Heng
- Prime Minister: Lon Nol (until March 11), Sisowath Sirik Matak (starting March 11)

== See also ==
- List of Cambodian films of 1971
