= The Snake King's Wife Part 2 =

- The Thai film poster.
- Directed by: Tia Lim Kun
- Written by: Tia Lim Kun; Winai Kaewbutr
- Produced by: Arthaporn Raya
- Starring: Chea Yuthorn; Dy Saveth; Aranya Namwong
- Distributed by: Siam Film Development; Studio Bangkok; Winson(Hong Kong)
- Release date: 1973
- Countries: Cambodia; Thailand
- Languages: Khmer; Thai

The Snake King's Wife Part 2 (Khmer:ពស់កេងកង ភាគពីរ Puos Keng Kang Pheak Pii, Thai:งูเกงกอง ภาค 2, also Giant Snake 2 and Snake Girl 2: Revenge) is a 1973 Cambodian-Thai horror film directed by Tea Lim Koun. It is a sequel to the 1970 film The Snake King's Wife. The plot is the continuation from the prequel.

The Snake King's Wife Part 2 has the particularity of being a Cambodian-Thai coproduction. It stars Cambodians Chea Yuthorn (ជា យុទ្ធថន) and Dy Saveth (ឌី សាវ៉េត), together with Thai Aranya Namwong (อรัญญา นามวงศ์).

== Plot ==
The story continued from the happiness of Cantra's family which turned to sadness and terror because of black magic. This was caused by the love and revenge of a young pretty woman who wanted to put a spell to her father and turned her mother into a half wood-Human woman and Cantra's hair became the little snake again. However, the revenge of Cantra began. Then poisonous snakes including cobra and python started hurting everyone who interfered.
