= The Snake King's Wife =

The Snake Man
- Thai promotional poster
- Directed by: Tea Lim Koun
- Written by: Tea Lim Koun
- Produced by: Tea Lim Koun
- Starring: Dy Saveth; Chea Yuthorn; Loto; Saksi Sbong; Mandoline
- Release date: 1970
- Running time: 164 minutes
- Country: Cambodia
- Language: Khmer

The Snake Man, also known as The Snake King's Wife (Khmer: ពស់កេងកង, Puăh Kengkâng; Thai: งูเก็งกอง, RTGS: Ngu-kengkong) is a 1970 Cambodian drama horror film based on a Cambodian myth about a snake goddess, starring the most well-known Khmer actress of the era, Dy Saveth and Chea Yuthorn, who became popular in Thailand after the film's release. The film was directed by Chinese Cambodian director Tea Lim Koun who experienced unprecedented success as a result of the film and is known today as one of the fathers of Khmer Cinema.

The film was an enormous commercial success in Cambodia and had been released worldwide, with much success also in neighboring Thailand, which brought back an impressive result of grossing revenue. The film was one of the biggest box-office hits in Southeast Asia at the time, holding today as Khmer Classic films for decades. As reported by Thailand's Krung Thep Turakij newspaper, The Snake Man is a Khmer film awarded at the 19th Asian Movie Awards in Singapore in 1972 where it received 6 golden awards including Best Director and Best Actress.

== Plot ==
The film begins following the life of Neang Ni, a Cambodian woman. Ni is married to her husband Minob. Ni and Minob have a young daughter. One day, Minob leaves town for work, leaving his daughter and wife at home. He tells their daughter that he will return home soon.

Ni and her daughter are scavenging for food in their crops, when Ni breaks her shovel-head in an attempt to dig. There is a snake in the hole that her shovel had burrowed, and this snake claims that he is the Snake King. The Snake King tells Ni that he will help her family if he sleeps with her. So Ni does.

Ni hides the affair from her husband and her daughter. However, when Minob returns, he discovers that she is pregnant and enraged by this, he manages to discover the secret and plans to kill the Snake King. Months later, Minob is able to chop the snake and cook its meat as food for Ni after many failed attempts. When Ni finds out about the death of the Snake King, she is murdered by her cruel husband while bathing. As her womb is opening, there are several little snakes being born; however, most of them are killed by Minob. Only one of the snakes is able to survive. As a child, the only lasting snake, Veasna arrives at a hermit's cottage where the hermit turns him into a human and names him Veasna.

Several years later, Veasna, has grown up to be a handsome man and he begins to fall in love with a rich man's daughter, Soriya. While they are in love, Soriya's stepmother who is jealous of their relationship plans to split them apart. She too is madly in love with Veasna. However, when Soriya's mother realizes that Veasna is a snake she meets an old witch who casts a spell that transfers him back into a snake. When, at her wedding, Soriya's father hears that his step wife has abandoned him, he immediately drops dead, the villagers are so afraid that they abandon the wedding. Despite his features, his wife still loves him, until one day, she gives birth to a female baby called Cantra. Unfortunately, she is born with tiny snakes as her hair - for the old witch had put a curse on her family. When she grows up, her father, suddenly turns into stone and her mother becomes a psycho due to her being kidnapped and forced to eat the blood of raw meat as food. Cantra becomes an orphan and also the servant for the ugly witch. Then, one day, she finds a plan to break the curse at midnight while the witch is seeking food - her shape being composed only of her head and intestines. Cantra goes to the witch's locker room and burns everything, including the witch's body. When the witch comes back, she is also burned in the fire. Finally, the curse is broken and Cantra's parents' human form are restored. This is due to Cantra's hair that becomes long and beautiful again. The family all live happily ever after in a big house.

== Release ==
Pous Keng Kang (which translates to 'The Giant Snake' in Cambodian/Khmer) was an almost immeasurable success in Cambodia, therefore resulting in its release to foreign non-affiliated countries including many Asian countries and several parts of Europe. In Thailand, the film reached double the number of hits than that of the Cambodia Box office. This was due partially to the Civil war that the kingdom of Cambodia was enduring.

The film is considered a classic of Cambodian cinema. As some other film with Dy Saveth, The Snake Man film was released on VHS in a heavily edited version.

== Remakes and sequel ==
After the success of the film in Cambodia, the film was then progressed in its story with the title The Snake Man Part 2 which was a co-production by Cambodia and Thailand starring Cambodian heartthrobs Chea Yuthorn (ជា យុទ្ធថន) and Dy Saveth (ឌី សាវ៉េត), together with formerly famous Thai actress Aranya Namwong and released at the following year of the prequel.

After the return of peace in Cambodia, the first major movie made in Cambodia was The Snake King's Child, intended as a sequel of The Snake King's Wife .
