= Pkah Thgall Meas =

1975 Cambodian film

- The Cambodian film poster.
- Directed by: Sok Min Chi
- Written by: Sok Min Chi
- Starring: Vichara Dany; Vann Vannak; Sok Samer; Nom Nap
- Distributed by: Ah Mata Production
- Release date: 1975
- Country: Cambodia
- Language: Khmer

Pkah Thgall Meas (Khmer: ផ្កាថ្កុលមាស) (The Golden Ball of 1969) is a 1975 Cambodian drama film. It was a well-known film in Cambodia before the Khmer Rouge gained power.

== Plot ==
Twin brothers are born on the same day that a murder occurs. The twins separate from each other; one is adopted into a rich family while the other remains on the poor ground. Several years past when the poor twin begins to fall in love with a rich man's daughter named Pkah Tgall Meas. The couple faces many adversities from a cruel wealthy man. It is up to the rich twin to save the life of his poor twin brother and his love Pkah Thgall Meas.
