= Thavory Meas Bong =

- Promotional poster
- Directed by: Uon Kon Thuok
- Starring: Kong Som Eun; Saom Vansodany; Vichara Dany; So Hean
- Music by: Sinn Sisamouth
- Distributed by: Korng Chak Pheap Yun
- Release date: 1969
- Country: Cambodia
- Language: Khmer

Thavory Meas Bong (or Thavary Meas Bang, Thavary Meas Bong) (ថាវរីមាសបង; lit. Thavory, "sister of gold") is a 1969 Cambodian melodramatic film directed by Uon Kon Thuok (aka Uong Citta or Uong Kanthouk). Distributed by Korng Chak Pheap Yun, it starred Kong Som Eun, Saom Vansodany, Vichara Dany and So Hean. The songs were performed by Sinn Sisamouth.

== Premise ==
Sunny and Sorin want to separate Socheat and Thavory (of whom they are respectively jealous) and they try to convince the latter that she has contracted leprosy.

== Cast ==
- Kong Som Eun - Socheat
- Saom Vansodany -Thavory
- Vichara Dany- Sunny
- So Hean- Sorin

== Soundtrack ==
Song	Singer(s)	Notes
Sronos Tuk Pleang	Sinn Sisamouth	
Thaovary Meas Bong	Sinn Sisamouth	

== Reception ==
Linda Saphan described the film as offering a "deep dive into the psychological states of its characters, specifically explored through the supporting roles of obsessive Sunny, played by Vichara Dany, and Sorin, played by So Hean."

The film was called one of the director's "major works" and described as "a landmark work, a romantic drama of rare psychological depth in which the obsessions and unrequited loves of its characters plunge the viewer into the heart of the intimate dilemmas of humanity. Set in contemporary Phnom Penh, this feature film subtly illustrates the contradictions and tensions between social heritage and deep emotions, with an exceptional cast including Som Van Soudany, Kong Som Oeun and Vichara Dany."

== Legacy ==
The film was preserved by the Bophana Audiovisual Research Center; it was screened on November, 26, 2022, at the ACMI and at the 15th Cambodia International Film Festival on March, 27, 2026, as part of a tribute to the director.

Linda Saphan mentioned, however, that the director had "said that the versions of her films that survive [were] not really the films she made, as they [had] been edited by exhibitors beyond recognition."
