= Norok Lokey =

1969 Khmer film

Noruok Lokey (The Hell of Earth)
- Starring: Chea Yuthon; Nop Yada; Sak Si Sboung
- Music by: Sinn Sisamouth
- Distributed by: Angkor
- Release date: 1969
- Country: Cambodia
- Language: Khmer

Norok Lokei is a 1969 Khmer film starring Chea Yuthon, Nop Yada and Sak Si Sboung.

== Soundtrack ==
- Nork Lokei by Ros Serey Sothear
- Lea Huy Songsa Khnhom by Sinn Sisamouth and Ros Serey Sothea
