= Sovann Pancha =

1970 Cambodian film directed by Yvon Hem

- Khmer promotional Poster
- Directed by: Yvon Hem
- Produced by: Yvon Hem
- Starring: Vann Vannak; Vichara Dany
- Music by: Sinn Sisamouth
- Production company: Baksei Thansuor Films
- Release date: 1970
- Country: Cambodia
- Language: Khmer

Sovann Pancha (Khmer: សុវណ្ណបញ្ចា, romanized: Sŏvăn Pănhcha, ALA-LC: Suvaṇṇa Pañcā) is a 1970 Cambodian film directed by Yvon Hem starring Vann Vannak and Vichara Dany.

== Plot ==
Penavong, Vann Vannak, a student of Ta Esei, is sent on a mission to capture the giant when he meets the beautiful Sovann Pancha, Vichara Dany. As soon as Penavong and Sovann Pancha meet, they contend in a battle. Penavong makes a promise with Sovann Pancha for if she loses in the battle she is to help him defeat the giant. After several days on the mission, the two interact with each other; and eventually, they fall in love.

== Cast ==
- Vann Vannak
- Vichara Dany

== Soundtrack ==
Song	Singer(s)	Notes
Snae Penavong	Sinn Sisamouth and Ros Serey Sothear	
