= Aranya Namwong =

Thai actress (born 1947)

- อรัญญา นามวงศ์
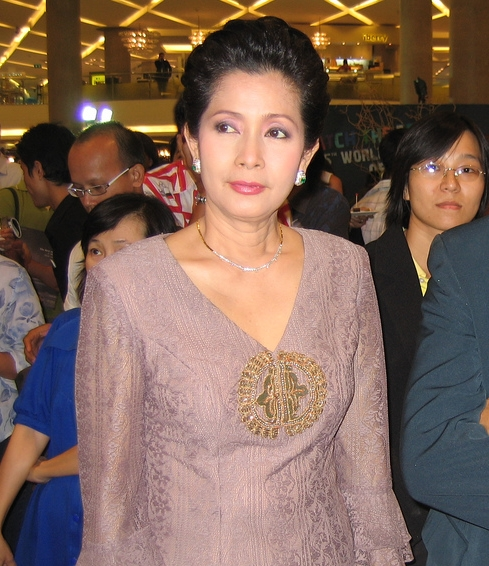
- Aranya at World Film Festival of Bangkok in 2007
- Born: Anchali Choppradit; 4 September 1947 (age 78); Lopburi, Thailand
- Other name: Piak (เปี๊ยก)
- Occupation: Actress
- Years active: 1964–present
- Spouse: Setha Sirachaya (died 2022)

Anchali Sirachaya (Thai: อัญชลี ศิระฉายา; née Anchali Choppradit, Thai: อัญชลี ชอบประดิษฐ์), professionally known as Aranya Namwong (Thai: อรัญญา นามวงศ์), and nicknamed Piak (Thai: เปี๊ยก), (born September 4, 1947, Lopburi) is a Thai actress.

== Career ==
She was the runner-up of 1964 Miss Thailand.

She was the lead actress in many Thai films in the 1970s, often co-starring with Sombat Metanee. She also enjoyed popularity in Cambodia after her joint role in The Snake King's Wife Part 2, a prequel of the Cambodian blockbuster and award-winning film, The Snake King's Wife starring the famous Khmer actress and former Miss Cambodia, Dy Saveth. She then took a main rule in another Thai-khmer film, Love across Hoirzotal, with the Khmer lead actor Chea Yutatorn. Recent films include The Legend of Suriyothai, The Bodyguard, Unborn and The Mother.

== Personal life ==
She is married to Setha Sirichaya, lead singer of The Impossibles.
