= Apsara (film) =

1966 Cambodian film by Norodom Sihanouk

- Directed by: Norodom Sihanouk
- Written by: Norodom Sihanouk
- Starring: Nhiek Tioulong; Saksi Sbong; Norodom Buppha Devi; Sisowath Chivan Monirak; Mandoline
- Cinematography: Sam Al Som
- Edited by: Norodom Sihanouk
- Production company: Khemara Pictures
- Release date: 20 August 1966
- Running time: 135 minutes
- Country: Cambodia
- Language: Khmer

Apsara (Khmer: អប្សរា, Âbsâréa) is a 1966 Cambodian romantic drama film edited, written, and directed by Norodom Sihanouk, who was Cambodia's Chief of State and former King. It stars Nhiek Tioulong, Saksi Sbong, Princess Norodom Buppha Devi, and Prince Sisowath Chivan Monirak.

Apsara was Sihanouk's first feature-length film, as well as his first film in colour. He made the film in part to counter the negative portrayal of Cambodia he saw in the 1965 British-American film Lord Jim. The film premiered at the LUX Theater in Phnom Penh on 20 August 1966.

== Cast ==
- Nhiek Tioulong as General Rithi
- Saksi Sbong as Rattana
- Norodom Buppha Devi as Kantha, a dancer
- Sisowath Chivan Monirak as Lieutenant Phaly, a pilot
- Norodom Narindrapong as Narin, brother of Phaly
- Norodom Phurissara
- Sinn Sisamouth as Singer
- Sieng Dy as Singer
- Suy
- Mandoline
