= Chhnam Oun 16 (1973 film) =

- Produced by: Chea Yuthon
- Starring: Chea Yuthon; Saom Vansodany
- Music by: Sinn Sisamouth
- Release date: 1973
- Country: Cambodia
- Language: Khmer

Chhnam Oun 16 (Khmer: ឆ្នាំអូន១៦; lit. 'I'm 16') is a 1973 Cambodian film starring Chea Yuthon and Saom Vansodany. Shortly after the film was released, the public found Chea Yuthon and saom Vansodany engaged.

== Cast ==
- Chea Yuthon
- Saom Vansodany

== Soundtrack ==
Song	Singer(s)	Notes
Cham 10 Kae Teat Sen	Ros Serey Sothear	
I'm So Shy	Ros Serey Sothear	
Chnam Oun 16 or Sweet 16	Ros Serey Sothear	
