= Sovannahong =

- Khmer promotional Poster
- Directed by: Yvon Hem
- Starring: Saom Vansodany; Kong Som Oeurn
- Release date: 1967
- Country: Cambodia
- Language: Khmer

Sovannahong (Khmer: សុវណ្ណហង្ស, en. Golden Phoenix) is a 1967 Cambodian film directed by Yvon Hem and based on Khmer mythology about the first Khmer creation of a giant phoenix made from gold which similar to the plane nowadays. It is one of the most successful local fantasy films in the 1960s.

== Soundtrack ==
Song	Singer(s)	Notes
Bong Some Taup Pdet (Male)	Meas Kok	
Bong Some Taup Pdet (Female)	Huoy Meas	
Preah Svamei	Huoy Meas	
Anicha Veasna Nei Yeung	Huoy Mes	

== Cast ==
- Saom Vansodany
- Kong Som Oeurn
- Or Po
- Or Dom
- Mae Meun
- Mandoline
