= Narie Hem =

Cambodian actress (1937–2023)

Narie Hem (13 February 1937 – 13 September 2023), also known as Nary Hem, was a Cambodian actress known for her portrayal of Dara in the French film Bird of Paradise (l'Oiseau de Paradis) by Marcel Camus.

== Early life and career ==
Hem (née Hem-Reun) was born in Cambodia to Hem Chiam Reun, a chief commissioner, and Hem Dak Peay. She was the second oldest of eleven children.

Hem was cast by Marcel Camus to portray the role of Dara, a beautiful Khmer dancer, alongside Nop Nem in his film Bird of Paradise.

With the help of her father, Nary created her own production company, Baksey Thaansuo (khmer for "bird of paradise").

== Personal life and death ==
Hem moved to Thonon-les-Bains, France after the death of her first husband Armand Gaston Gerbié with whom she had two children. Her son Armand was born in 1960 and her daughter Soriya was born in 1961. After the death of her husband, she remarried, changing her name to Narie Duteil.

Hem died on 13 September 2023 in France, at the age of 86.

== Filmography ==
Year	Title	Role	Director
1962	L'Oiseau de Paradis	Dara	Marcel Camus
