= Saksi Sbong =

- Born: 1940 (age 85–86); Cambodia
- Years active: 1962–1975, 1990

Saksi Sbong (Note: សាក់ ស៊ីស្បោង, Săk Sisbaong; Khmer pronunciation: [sak si.sɓaoŋ]) is a Cambodian actress who mainly played the role of villains in Cambodian pre-Khmer Rouge films.

Sisbaong was born in Phnom Penh, the capital city of Cambodia, in 1940. After working as a flight attendant doing the liaison between Phnom Penh and Bangkok, she started taking up acting roles in movies produced by Norodom Sihanouk, beginning with Apsara in 1966 and culminating with her most famous role in La Joie de Vivre, filmed in 1968–69, in which she plays Princess Sulpra. Already a "famous Cambodian actress" in 1969, she became even more popular for her cruel vicious character in films such as Tep Sodachan and Pos Keng Kong in the 1970s.

Sisbaong fled Cambodia to live in France before the rule of the Khmer Rouge and only returned to Cambodia to film one last movie in the early 1990s.

When Sisbaong returned to Cambodia in 2018 to attend a royal funeral for which she shaved her head following Khmer tradition, many were surprised that she was still alive as it was widely believed she had been executed by the Khmers Rouges.

Sisbaong now considers herself as a devout Buddhist and a staunch supporter of the Cambodian monarchy.

== Filmography ==
- Apsara (1966) - Rattana
- The Little Prince (1966) - step aunt of the little prince
- Chet Mdai (1967)
- Tep Sodachan (1968)
- La Joie de Vivre (1968/1969) - Princess Sulpra
- Sdach Domrei Sa (1969)
- Veasna Akosol (1970)
- Norok Lokey (1970)
- Pinpea Sa Cheat
- Vil Vinh Na Bong (1971)
- The Snake King's Wife ("Pos Keng Kong", 1972) - step wife, Sarika
- Pichayvongsa (1972)
- The Snake King's Wife Part 2 ("Pos Keng Kong 2", 1973) - step wife, Sarika
- Pka Dos Kontuy
- Aso Oun Pong
- Lea Oun Tao Chbang
