= Virak Dara =

Cambodian actress

- វីរៈ តារា
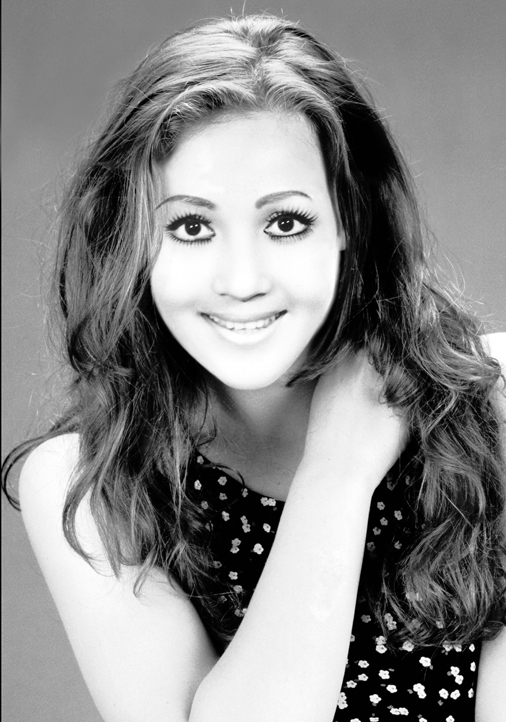
- Dara in 1974
- Born: Kuem Hiak; 1947 (age 78–79); Kampot, Cambodia, French Indochina
- Years active: 1965–1974
- Spouse: Ly Bun Yim (divorced)

Virak Dara (Note: Khmer: វីរៈ តារា; Vireă Dara, [ʋiː.rĕəʔ ɗaː.raː]) (born Kuem Hiak; (Note: Khmer: គឹម ហៀក; Kuĕm Hiak, [kɨm hiək]) 1947) is a Cambodian actress primarily known for her roles in the 1960s and early-to-mid-1970s. In 1967 she starred as "Kangrei" in Puthisaen Niang Kangrei, which is to date the biggest Cambodian movie ever made. Her most famous film is An Aeuy Srei An, released in 1971. Dara quickly became a fan favorite.

== History ==
When Ly Bun Yim, one of the leading filmmakers in Cambodia at that time, met Dara, he wanted her to star in his films. Her parents initially did not consent, but after the two were married, Virak Dara changed her name and began her acting career. Dara would go on to star in 11 feature films, all directed by her husband. Other production companies were interested in having Dara in their movies, but Ly Bun Yim did not want his wife to work for other studios.

Virak Dara and her husband were trapped in Cambodia during the Khmer Rouge regime. Three of Dara's films were never released, as they were destroyed by the Khmer Rouge. In 1977, the couple emigrated to France and struggled to make a living.

Dara currently lives in France and in the United States. Every year she travels to Cambodia. In 2000, she told an interviewer that "Cambodia is where my heart is."

== Family life ==
Virak Dara divorced Ly Bun Yim in 1986; they remain good friends. Dara has five sons. Ly Rattanak, her eldest, also appeared with her in many films, including An Aeuy Srei An.
