= Vann Vannak =

Cambodian actor

- Born: Cambodia
- Years active: Late-1960s – 1975

Vann Vannak (Khmer: វណ្ណ វណ្ណៈ) was a popular actor in Cambodia during the late 1960s until 1975. Despite his talents, producers usually favored casting his rivals Kong Som Oeurn or Chea Yuthorn in their movies. Due to their lack of support, Vann Vannak starred in considerably fewer films when compared to his rivals. Nevertheless, he was pivotal in movies such as Sovann Pancha, Neang Kakey, and Champa Meas all of which had Vichara Dany as the female lead. To increase his presence in the industry he created his own production company known as Pisnoka in 1970 which made eight films casting himself as the male lead in all of them.

Details of his life are relatively unknown and he is believed to have died under the Khmer Rouge regime. Of all the films he has starred in, only Sovann Pancha is known to have survived and remained intact.

== Partial filmography ==
- Sdach Damrey Sor
- Bey Sach Sorng Sek
- Phno Bey Leu Dey Kror
- Sro Our Samdey Srey Am
- Veal Srey Our Sror
- Chhean Entry Khmav
- Kror Mom Chol Mlob
- Neang Kev Nama
- Neang Sork Kror Ob
- Dav Roeung Neang Sovan Sakor
- Neang Kakey
- Neang Sovan Ten Orn
- Phka Thkol Meas
- Champa Meas
- Sovann Pancha
- Proleng Polikam
- Kone Krok Khmav 1
- Kanseng Loheth
- Chav Chab Kdam
- Kone Krok Khmav 2
- Dav Bak Dorng Meas Broyuth
- Dev Chhveng Sdam
