= Dy Saveth =

Cambodian actress (born 1944)

- ឌី សាវ៉េត
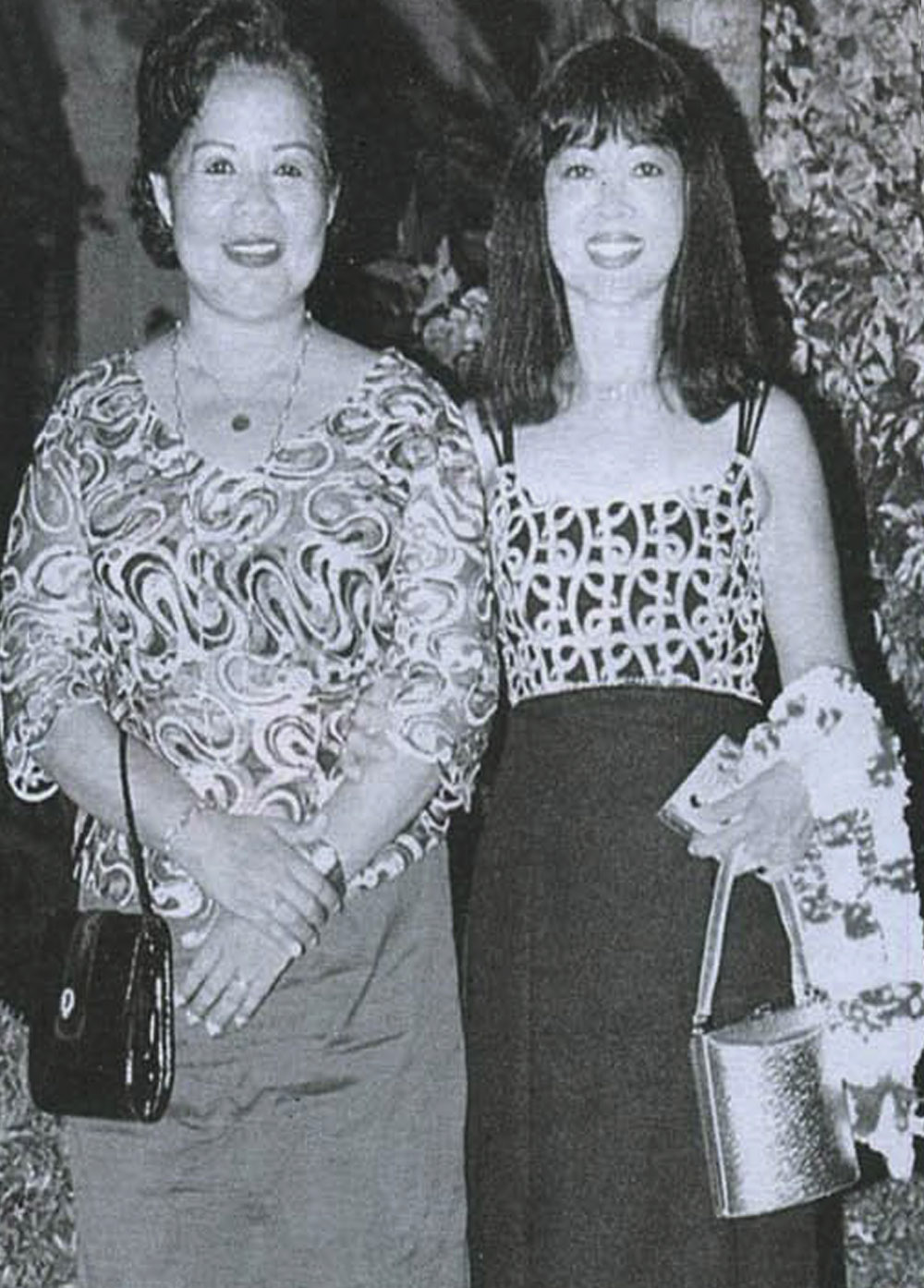
- Saveth (right) with Seang Vanthy
- Born: 7 May 1944 (age 82); Phnom Penh, Cambodia, French Indochina
- Years active: 1962–1975, 1993-present
- Spouse: Huoy Keng (divorced)

Dy Saveth (Khmer: ឌី សាវ៉េត, UNGEGN: Di Savet [ɗiː saʋeːt]; born 7 May 1944) is a Cambodian actress and first Miss Cambodia (1959) often referred to as the "actress of tears". She is "one of the most beloved actresses from the 1960s era of Cambodian film".

== Biography ==
=== A rising star of Cambodian cinema ===
Dy Saveth was born in Cambodia on March 4, 1944, in a family of artists where women, at least since her grandmother, had been dancers of the Palace in the Royal Ballet. She obtained her first role as an actress at age 18 in 1962 in Kbuon Chivit (The Raft of Life), where she not only become famous as the "actress of tears" but also helped the production make a "massive profit", encouraging the movie industry in Cambodia to produce more movies locally. At age 19, Dy Saveth won the first beauty pageant of Miss Cambodia. In 1967, she played with Prince Sihanouk and his wife Monique in a thriller titled Ombre sur Angkor (Shadow on Angkor) about the downfall of the gruesome governor of Siem Reap, General Dap Chhuon. She rapidly obtained many new roles in the booming industry of Cambodian cinema, and starred in the 1969 Crepuscule (Twilight) movie, directed by Norodom Sihanouk, thus becoming "one of the best-known faces of the Golden Age of Khmer Cinema".

=== From actress of tears in the Rose of Pailin to tears in exile and flowers of Paris ===
She married Huoy Keng, an actor, producer and film director, during the 1970s. Just as Van Vanak ran his own production company, Huoy Keng and Dy Saveth jointly ran Sovann Kiry. During the Cambodian Civil War, she continued making numerous movies, and played her most famous role in Puos Keng Kang, with her director and mentor Tea Lim Koun. She was invited to join Thai movies as well, working with Thai director Sor Asanajinda in the 1971 film, Rak Kham Kob Fa, in which she sings a duet with Thai actor Sombat Metanee (using voice dubbers), as well as in another Thai movie, Nam Jai Por Kha, in which she shared the screen with Thai actress Aranya Namwong in the sequel to Puos Keng Kang.

After the Khmer Rouge came to power in 1975, Saveth, who was visiting friends in Bangkok during the fall of Phnom Penh, escaped with Huoy Keng to France, leaving four of her siblings behind. The couple later moved to Hong Kong, where they separated. Keng continued his film business and became one of Hong Kong's first millionaires, while Saveth abandoned acting and became a florist in Paris. She later moved to Nice where she lived for 18 years before returning to Cambodia.

=== Returning to Cambodia and to acting ===
Saveth returned to Cambodia in 1993 and resumed acting, after she was recognized on the street by an employee of the Cambodia National Television, while she was crying for help as a nearby was had caught fire. In 1994, she joined an unreleased film title The Saw Wheel with Cambodian actor Haing Ngor. Saveth has been involved in training a new generation of actors and actresses since returning to Cambodia by teaching performance at the Royal University of fine arts, training contemporary Khmer artists such as Leang Seckon, and participating in the Koun Khmer Film Camp. In 2011, she appeared in the documentary Golden Slumbers by filmmaker Davy Chou. In 2012, she made her stage debut in the play Cambodia, Here I Am by Jean-Baptiste Phou, attracting a "keen interest from audiences".

== Family ==
Saveth is divorced from her ex-husband Houy Keng, with whom she had two children. She also has one adopted daughter.

== Legacy ==
=== A legendary actress of Cambodia ===
With her filmography comprising more than a hundred films, some consider Saveth a legend of Cambodian cinema.

=== A witness to the lost reels of Cambodian cinema ===
Saveth, as one of the rare artists and actresses along with Prum Manh to have survived the Cambodian genocide, has become an important link in the transmission of collective memory in Cambodia.

Dy Saveth, who lives surrounded by photos of film-makers and actors lost during the Khmer rouge period, embodies the imperative to testify, to speak for and remember those who died.

— Leslie Barnes, Palimpsestic Memory and the Lost History of Cambodian Film

== Filmography ==
Saveth was featured in many films throughout the 1960s and 1970s until the communist takeover in 1975, and later from 1993 to present. She has starred in over 100 Cambodian films, most of which were lost due to the Khmer Rouge era, including:

Year	Movie	Role	Other notes
1962	Kbuon Chivit (Raft Life)		
1963	Anlong Veasna		
1964	Kathreuy Moha Sronoh		
1965	Veasna Akosal		Present existence
1965	Sayon Touch Yum		
1965	Lolok Nhi Chhmoul		
1965	L'oiseau Du Paradis		Khmer-French joint film
1966	Khyang Sangselachey		
1966	Neang Kev Nama, Thida Muk Seh	Kev Nama	
1966	K'ek Proat Bangkang		
1966	Katreuy Moha Sranah		
1967	Pao Chouk Sao		Present existence
1967	Neang Vimean Chan		
1967	Neang Kev Nama		The film was directed by Dy Saveth herself. Two versions of Neang Keo Nama were released before the Khmer Rouge.
1967	Ombre Sur Angkor (Chaya Leu Angkor)	1st wife of general Mcholpich	Present existence
1967	Toek Phnek Leu Khnang Phnum		
1968	Unlucky Life		(Khmer/French film: 1968) Present existence
1968	Love and War		(Khmer/French film: 1968) Present existence
1968	S'ek On Lea Bang Haeuy		
1968	Kraitoung Neng Kropeu Charavan		
1969	Crepuscule (Twilight), directed by and starring Norodom Sihanouk and Huoy Keng	Neang Sopheap	(Khmer/French film: 1969) Present existence
1969	Sdech Damrei Sa (King of the White Elephant)		
1969	Lea Haeuy Duong Dara		(Khmer/French film: 1969) Present existence
1969	Sayon Koma, Neang Preah, Neang Teptida		
1969	Chompa Thoung		Present existence
1970	The Snake King's Wife (The Python)		Won six awards at Singapore International Film Festival
1970	Lolok Nhi Chhmoul		
1970	Sayon Tuoch Yum		
1970	Sdech Damrei Sa		
1970	Botra Preah Athtih Psong Cheam Mday		
1971	Neang Lvea Chake		
1971	Velvinh Na Bang	Rumchong	Present existence
1971	Kolab Pailin		
1971	Srey Krob Leak		
1971	S'ek On Lea Bang Haeuy		
1972	Chivit Tmey		
1972	Bopha Angkor		
1972	Mak Theung		
1972	Preah Song Mdai		
1972	Vongveng Pruah Snae (Confused Because of Love)		
1972	Phnhaeu Kang Chang Dai		
1972	Toek Phnek Leu Khnang Phnum (Tears on the Back of a Mountain)'		
1973	Chivit Psong Praeng (Khmer/Thai film: 1973)		Soundtrack in both Khmer and Thai. Duet by Sinn Si Samouth and Dy Saveth herself in both languages. Present existence.
1973	Ok Pruot Tronum		Present existence
1973	Dao Dek 32		
1973	K'ek Proat Bangkang		
1973	Thngai Lich On Sranah (When The Sun Sets, I Miss You)		
1973	Thida Sak Puos (Snake Hair)		
1973	Pous Keng Kang 2	Soriya	(Khmer/Thai film: 1973) The sequel to The Snake King of 1972 which won six awards at the Singapore International Film Festival. The film includes two versions (male and female) of the songs "Soriya Psong Snae" by Sinn Sisamouth and Ros Serey Sothear.
1973	S'ab Nas Sralanh Nas (I Hate You, I Love You)		
1973	Anlong Veasna		
1974	Crocodile Man		
1974	Phnhnaeu Kang Chang Dai		
1974	Pruah Aprey Srey Rong Kam		
1974	Bopha Tol Den		
1974	Champa Battambang		
1975	Snake Girl In Drop		(Khmer/Chinese film: 1975)
1975	Blood Boxing Girl		(Khmer/Chinese film: 1975)
1983	Crocodile Men		(Khmer/Chinese film: 1983)
2002	Neak M'dai		Saveth portrays herself as a mother through her own experience.
2003	Min Yok Te Bdey Chas, S'ab Nas Bdei Kmeng (I Don't Want Old Husbands but I Hate Young Husbands)		
2004	At Bei (3 Ace)		
2005	The Crocodile		
2006	Soriya L'ngeach Thngai		
2008	Kev Phnek Samnab Chet		
2012	I Am Super Student		
2014	The Lost Reel	Srey Mom/Sothea	Won the Spirit of Asia Award at the 2014 Tokyo Film Festival

== Theater ==
Year	Play	Role	Notes
2012	Cambodia, here I am	Metha	

== Links ==
- "Nostalgie films khmers avant 1975". nostalgie-films-khmers-avant-1975.kazeo.com (in French). 2010-04-02. Archived from the original on 2010-04-02.
- Kunthear, Mom (2009-01-14). "Cambodian film star Dy Saveth nears half a century in the biz". Phnom Penh Post.
