= Saom Vansodany =

Cambodian actress

- Born: c. 1947; Cambodia
- Died: c. 1977 (aged 29–30)
- Years active: Late 1960s – 1975
- Spouse: Chea Yuthorn

Saom Vansodany (Khmer: សោម វណ្ណសូដានី, c. 1947 – c. 1977) or Som Van Sok Dany was a famous Cambodian actress from the late 1960s until 1975. She was mainly featured and famous for her roles in melodramatic movies such as Thavory Meas Bong and Sovannahong. She married fellow actor, Chea Yuthorn before the communist era. Details of her life are relatively unknown and she is believed to have perished from overwork under the Khmer Rouge regime shortly after giving birth to her son, Thorn Tharith.
