= Vichara Dany =

Cambodian actress (c.1948-c.1976)

- Born: c. 01 January 1948; French protectorate of Cambodia, French Indochina (now Cambodia)
- Died: c. 1976 (aged 27–28); Pursat, Kampuchea (In present-day Cambodia)
- Other name: Tith Vichara Dany
- Occupation: Actress
- Years active: 1963–1975
- Height: 1.55 m (5 ft 1 in)

Tith Vichara Dany (Note: ទិត្យ វិជ្ជរ៉ាដានី, Tĭt Vĭcheăra Dani; Khmer pronunciation: [tit ʋicheəraː daːniː]) was a popular Cambodian actress who most likely made her debut in 1967. She starred in a majority of films, which include Thavory Meas Bong, Tep Sodachan, and Sovann Pancha, during the nation's golden age of cinema. She is often paired on screen with fellow actor Kong Sam-Oeurn. Other notable actors she started with are Chea Yuthorn and Vann Vannak. In only a span of at least seven years, she is credited with having starred in over one hundred films. Details of her life are relatively unknown, and she is believed to have perished shortly after the rise of the Khmer Rouge regime.

Recently, a popular Cambodian magazine has shed some light on her life during and after the Khmer Rouge regime. She is said to have been married to a Khmer Rouge cadre. By the time Vietnamese forces had invaded Cambodia in 1979, Vichara escaped from her captors and headed back to Phnom Penh. Along the way, she is said to have died of complications during childbirth.

== Partial filmography ==
Modern times

- Chomrieng Et Preang Tuok (Unprepared Song)
- Pheakdey Snae (Faithful Love)
- Ream Cbong Yeung (Our Elders)
- Thavory meas bong (Thavory)
- Peil Dael Truv Yum (A Time to Cry)
- Mouy Muen Alai
- Srey na men yum
- Ahso oun pong
- San tyronn
- Chrolong Sath Meas
- Chralorm Songsa Srava Kos Kuo
- Kesor Mearlea
- Pyous Chivit
- Sayon Vil Venh
- Prom den Prom chet
- Polto Ahphorp
- Ah Sach Choun Mday
- Bong Kous Heuy Oun
- Chomnov Pailin

Ancient times

- Tep SodaChan
- Sovan Pancha
- Panchapor Tevy II
- Cheung Dai Ouvpouk
- Bomnol Cheam Ouvpok
- Teptyda klok Teip (The Princess of the Magical Gourd)
- Khyum surth heuy khyum yum (I laugh and I Cry)
- Panarong Pongnarith
- Techodamden
- Preas PerPath
- Gonsan Lohete (The Sacred Scarf)
- Gosan sla dok
- Dao pak daong meas (The Sword With the Golden Handle)
- Neang Champa Meas
- Pijayvonsa
- Pralmath Pralmong
- Phtong moranak
- Tao ak
- Preas Reach Gomah Pichsongvavong
- Srey sross Torng Vong
- Poss vath songnae (The Black Cobra)
- Neang champei sal
- Tralpeng pere
- Sovannthanann
- Pkah Thgall Meas (Khmer: ផ្កាថ្កុលមាស) 1975
- Sangsarajay
- Neang Badacha
- Jassdeth
- Gampoll boross muok pei (The Hero With Two Identities)
- Neang Ompolpich
- Preas Thuong Neang Nag
- Rithysang prune meas
- Akarat Mayura
- Sanmaron Sanmarie
- Gonsan Grawhom (The Red Scarf)
- Praleng khmot (The Spirit)
- Kralmom seurt kamloss yum (The Girls Laugh, The Men Cry)
- Sarai Ondeth
- Kralyam bysath (The Devil Claws)
