= Kong Som Eun =

- Born: c. 1947; French protectorate of Cambodia
- Origin: Cambodia
- Died: c. 1976 Democratic Kampuchea
- Occupation: Actor
- Years active: 1964–1975

Kong Som Eun (Note: Khmer: គង់ សំអឿន, Kǒng Sǎm Ueăn; [kɔŋ sɑm ɨən]) (born c. 1947– c. 1976) was a famous Cambodian actor and film director who ruled the Cambodian film industry from the mid-1960s through the early 1970s.

== Career ==
Kong Som Eun ranked higher than all Cambodian actors of the late 1960s and early 1970s. He starred in more than half of the films released per year from the years 1967–1975 giving him a total of more than 120 films in less than ten years. His career was cut short when the Khmer Rouge took power in Cambodia in 1975. It is believed that he died in 1976 under circumstances that remain unclear.

== Partial filmography ==
Year	Movie	Role	Other notes
1964	"Chea Satrey"		Opposite from Saom Vansodany
1964	Krung Sopamit		
1964	Pup Kmao Ngo Nget		
1964	Prasat Neang Kmao		
1965	"Loloke Nhi Chmole"		Opposite from Dy Saveth
1965	Sayon Touch Yum		
1965	Sapresit		Present Existence
1965	Kathrauy Moha Sronos		
1966	Kun Chang Kun Paen		
1966	Moranak Meada		
1966	Vimean Chan		
1966	Preah Ream Jole Kout Bunchout Neang Seda (Reamke)		
1966	Saóp Nas Srolanh Nas		
1966	Sromoul Akara		
1966	Tuk Pnek Neang Ko		Present Existence
1966	Tomnuonh Sek Sok		
1966	Dara Vichey Malai Soriya		Present Existence
1967	Neang Keo Nama		
1967	Preah Chan Korup		Present Existence
1967	Preah Leak Sinavong Neang Pream Kesor		
1967	Puthisean Neang Kong Rey		Present Existence
1967	Sovannahong		Present Existence
1967	Tuk Pnek Leu Knong Phnom		
1967	Tep Tida Yuo Preah Klen		
1968	Ah Sach June Mdai		
1968	Tep Sodachan		Present Existence
1968	Athitvongsa Sisoriyavong		
1968	Cheav Kun Reu Chan Kesei		
1968	Kraithoung Kropeu Charavan		Followed by 1969's Chompa Toung
1968	Mang Setao Mang Seneat		
1968	Pimpea Sor Cheat		
1968	Pkai Dos Kuntuy		
1968	Preah Toung Neang Neak		
1968	Abul Kasame		
1968	Ynav Bosseba		
1968	Saék Oun Lea Bong Hauy		
1968	Sen Tearun		
1969	Chompa Toung		
1969	Inthik Sovann Chan Kesor		
1969	Chan Greoufa		
1969	Sayon Koma Nung Preah Neang Tep Tida		
1969	Pukol Koma		
1969	Thavory Meas Bong		
1970	Hang Yun		
1970	Muoy Meun Alai		Present Existence
1970	Pen Sovann		
1970	Pka Angkeabos		
1970	Preah Mohosot		
1970	Preay Krola Pleung		
1970	Tropeang Peay		
1970	Rathanavong		Present Existence
1971	Bomnul Cheam Ovpuk		
1971	Chan Deka Songvapich		
1971	Chin Siphat Chin Siphay		
1971	Preah Peay Phat		
1971	Neang Ptul Meas		
1971	Neang Kontong Kiev		
1971	Panjapor Tevi		
1971	Cha'ung Dai Ovpuk		Present Existence
1971	Penarong Pongnarith		
1971	Pich Songvavong		
1971	Preah Komchaitip		
1971	Tida Klok Tep		
1971	Tngai Juop Tngai Prot		
1972	Chak Deth		
1972	Chanthavong Nung Neang Kesor Bopha		
1972	Kompul Boros Mok 2		
1972	Lea Srey Tov Chbang		
1972	Knhom Sauch Hauy Knhom Yum		
1972	Lum Ong Pka Sla		
1972	Lum Ong Puthichat		
1972	Moan Sor Moan Kmao		
1972	Neang Champei Sor		
1972	Orn Euy Srey Orn		Present Existence
1972	Panjapor Tevi		Present Existence
1972	Peil Dael Truv Yum		Present Existence
1972	Riem Chbong Yeung		
1972	Paendei Vil		
1972	Rithisen Prune Meas		
1972	Senarong Senary		
1972	Si Yin Kuy		
1972	Teav Aek		
1973	Aso Oun Pong		
1973	Beisach Kromum		
1973	Cham Na Prumliket		
1973	Chivit Ahpuop		Present Existence
1973	Jivit Tmei		
1973	Jaol Sach Jrova Chaúng		
1973	Konsaeng Krohom		
1973	Neang Lovea Chek		
1973	Pei Neang Leak		
1973	Polto Ahpuop		
1973	Somneang Snae Kam		
1973	Sompeay Kam		
1973	Sompong Pka Cha		
1973	Tung Moranak		
1974	Jomnong Dav Tuk Pnek		
1974	Konsaeng Sla Dok		
1974	Keo Long Keo Lai		
1974	Kolap Longvek		
1974	Neang Trocheul Dos Tral		
1974	Oh Na Satum Srey		Directed by Vichara Dany
1974	Plov Chek Chea 3		
1974	Pnhau Kong Chong Dai		
1974	Preah Moha Mongkaline		
1974	Sliek Kyol Dundop Mek		
1974	Srey Na Min Yum		
1974	Srey Sross Tong Vong		
1974	Tida Sok Puos		Present Existence
1974	Tida Song Sek		
1974	Tumnuonh Bangklong Kaék		
1975	Oun Nung Bong		
1975	Bet Pnek Haek Trung		
1975	Neang Seda Duong		
1975	Pous Trung Oun Tov		Present Existence. Latest Pre-Khmer Rouge film in existence.
1975	Rath Champei Srey O Rumduol		
1975	Apea Pikpea Jrolom Kann Sla		
1975	Pkai Preah Angkea		
1975	Sess Samot		
1975	Tuk Pnek Kolap Battambang		
